= Dima, Spain =

Dima
- Municipality
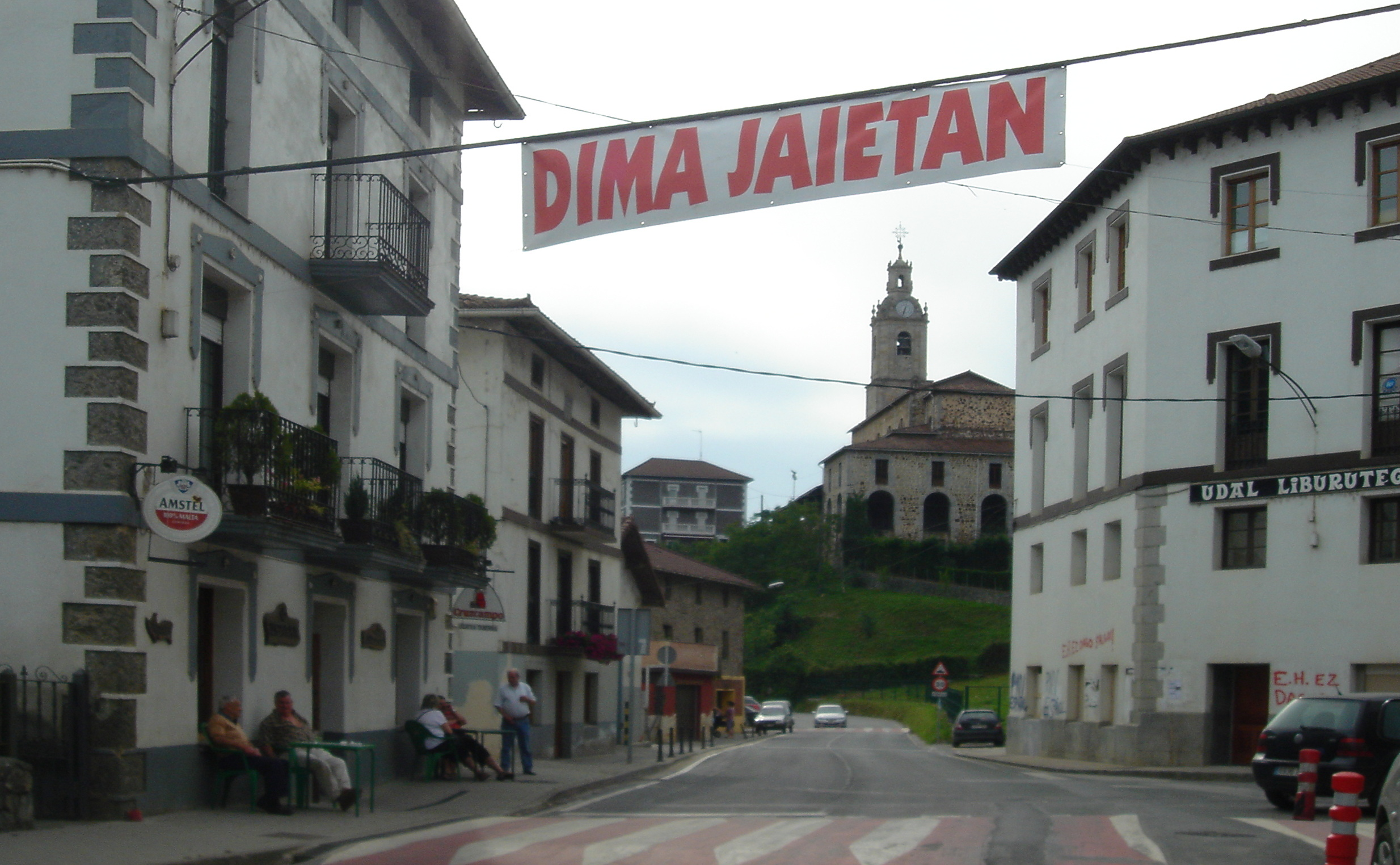
- A street in Dima

- Flag Coat of arms

- Location of Dima within the Basque Country Location of Dima within Spain
- Coordinates: 43°06′34″N 2°42′30″W
- Country: Spain
- Autonomous community: Basque Country
- Province: Biscay
- Comarca: Arratia-Nerbioi

Government
  - Mayor: Rafael Ugalde Iragorri

Area
  - Total: 61 km^{2} (24 sq mi)
- Elevation: 133 m (436 ft)

Population (2025-01-01)
  - Total: 1,531
  - Density: 25/km^{2} (65/sq mi)
- Demonym: Dimoztarra
- Time zone: UTC+1 (CET)
  - Summer (DST): UTC+2 (CEST)
- Postal code: 48141

Dima is a town and municipality of the province of Biscay, in the Basque Country, Spain. Dima is part of the comarca of Arratia-Nerbioi and had a population of 1,313 inhabitants in 2010 according to the Spanish National Statistics Institute.

== Geography ==
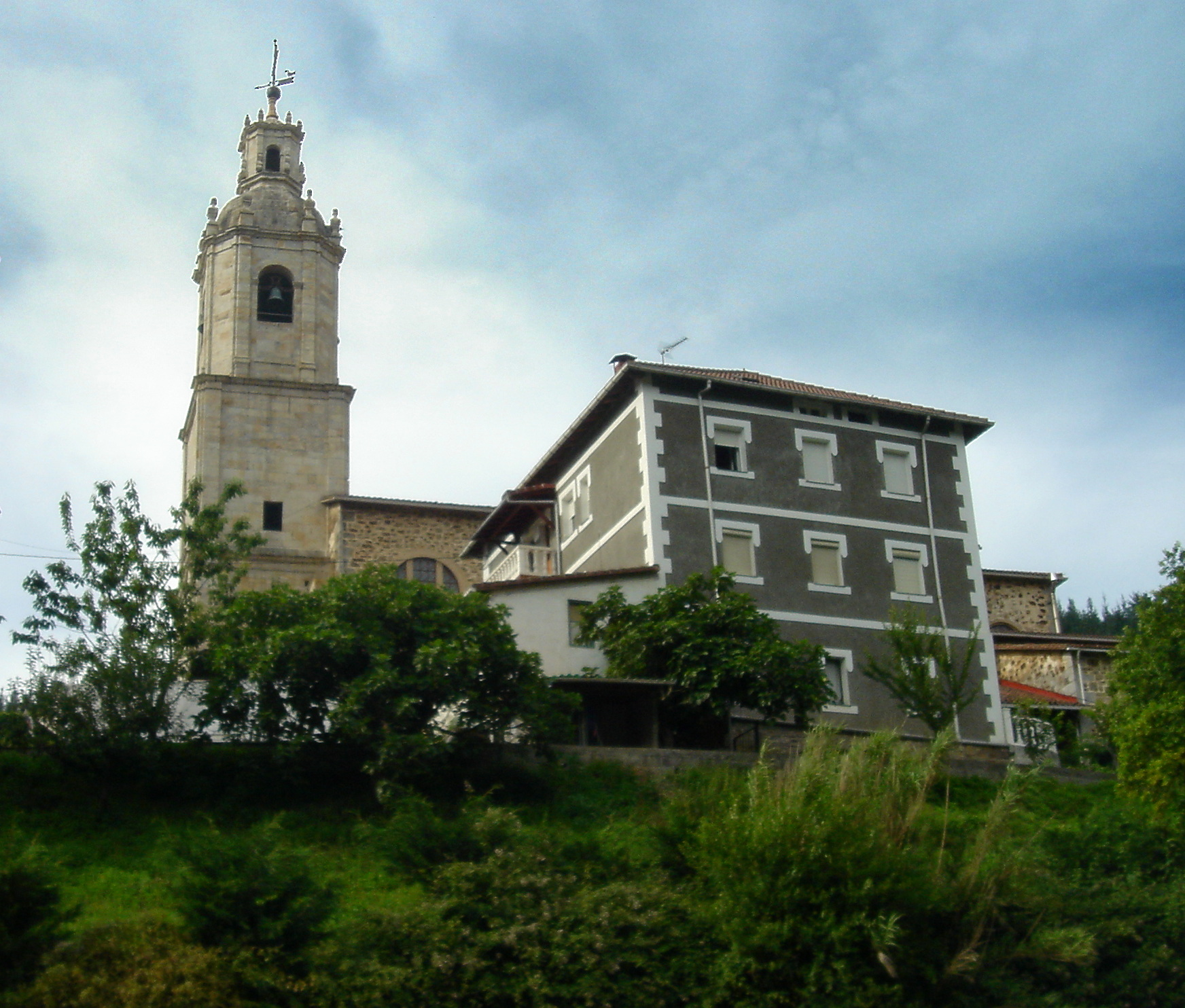
Church of Dima

Dima is located in the comarca of Arratia-Nerbioi, in the south of the province of Biscay, northern Spain. It limits at north with the municipalities of Igorre and Amorebieta-Etxano at north, Durango at northeast, Mañaria at east, Abadiño at southeast, Otxandio and Ubide at south and Zeanuri, Areatza, Artea and Arantzazu at west. Part of the municipality is located within the Urkiola Natural Park. The Axlor archaeological site is nearby.

== Transportation ==
The town is accessible only by road; the BI-3543 connects it with Igorre and Otxandio. The Bizkaibus line A3925 has several stops within the municipality and connects it with Otxandio, Lemoa, Galdakao and Bilbao (the capital city of the province), among others. There are buses in both directions (direction Otxandio and direction Bilbao) every hour.
