= Arratia-Nerbioi =

Coordinates: 43°07′37″N 2°48′55″W

- Eskualdea / Comarca
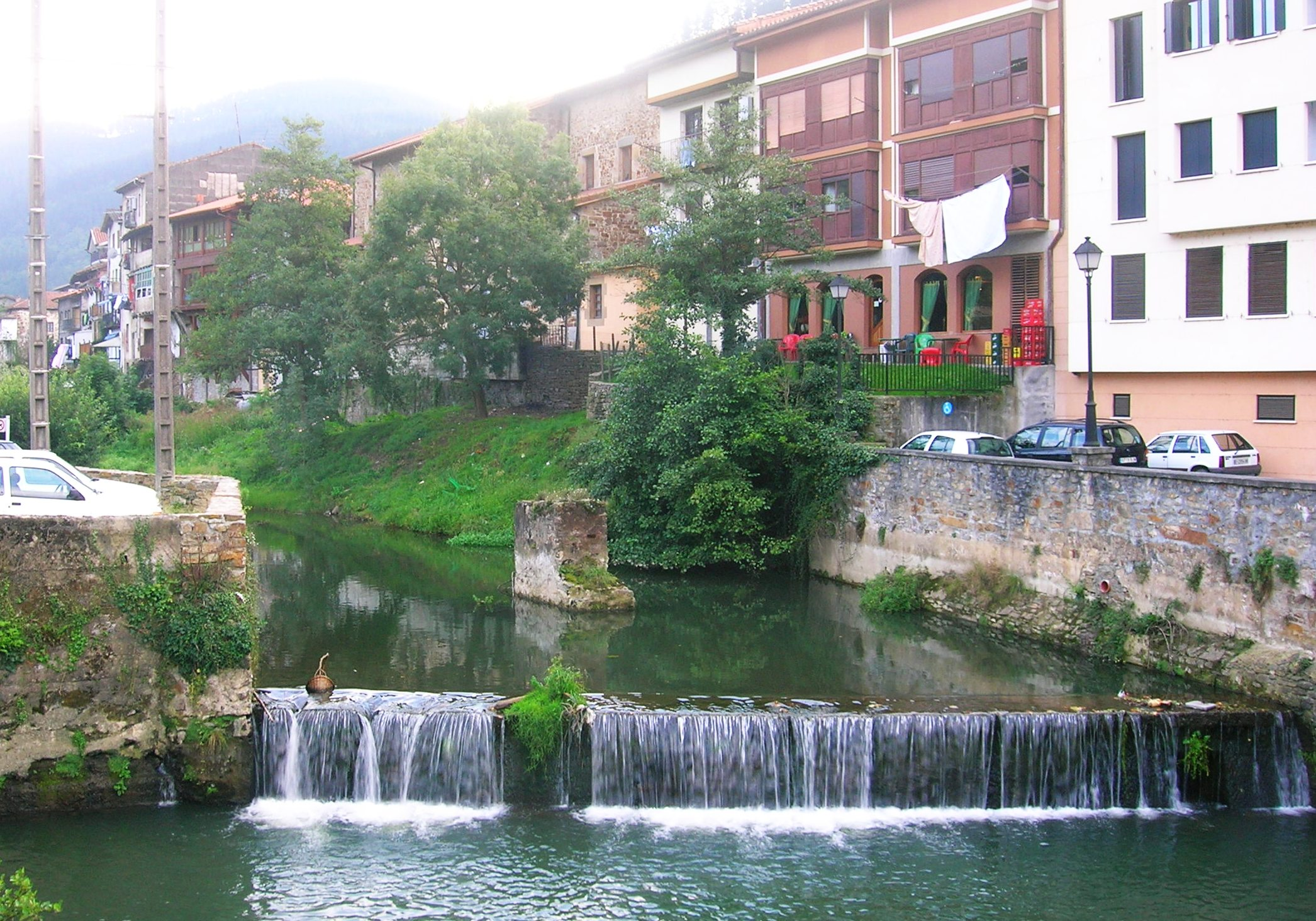
- Arratia river in Areatza
- Interactive map of Arratia-Nerbioi
- Country: Spain
- Autonomous community: Basque Country
- Province: Biscay
- Municipalities: List: Arakaldo, Arantzazu, Areatza, Arrankudiaga, Artea, Bedia, Dima, Igorre, Lemoa, Orozko, Otxandio, Ubide, Ugao-Miraballes, Orduña-Urduña, Zeanuri, Zeberio
- Time zone: UTC+1 (CET)
  - Summer (DST): UTC+2 (CEST)

Arratia-Nerbioi (Spanish: Arratia-Nervión) is a comarca of the province of Biscay, in the Basque Country, Spain. It is formed by the valleys of the Arratia River and the Nervión river. It is one of the seven eskualdeak or comarcas that compose the province of Biscay.

== Geography ==
Arratia-Nerbioi is located to the south of the province of Biscay. It borders with the region of Greater Bilbao to the north and Durangaldea to the northeast. The Basque province of Álava is to the south. The comarca of Arratia-Nerbioi is formed by the valleys of the Arratia river and the Nervión river. Orduña-Urduña is an exclave of the comarca, being enclaved by Araba/Álava province.

== Municipalities ==
#	Municipality	Population	Territory km^{2}
	Arakaldo	112	2.65
	Arantzazu	325	3.75
	Areatza	1,142	9.1
	Arrankudiaga	920	22.75
	Artea	760	12.4
	Bedia	1,111	16.5
	Dima	1,313	61.80
	Igorre	4,239	17
	Lemoa	3,614	15.85
	Orduña-Urduña	4,258	33.49
	Orozko	2,405	102.42
	Otxandio	1,322	1.24
	Ugao-Miraballes	4,050	4.54
	Ubide	167	2.9
	Zeanuri	1,302	66.98
	Zeberio	1,060	47.15
