= Axlor =

Cave and archaeological site in Spain

- Location within Spain
- 43°07′16″N 2°43′41″W
- Type: rock shelter
- Location: Dima village
- Region: Biscay, Basque Community

Site notes
- Material: Karst
- Excavation dates: 1967, 2000
- Archaeologists: Jose Miguel Barandiaran

Axlor is a prehistoric archeological site in the village of Dima in Biscay in the Autonomous Basque Community of Spain, dating from the Middle Paleolithic or Mousterian period.

== Excavation ==
The shelter is the mouth of an old cave that has been filled up with clay from the Indusi karst. The archaeologist Jose Miguel Barandiaran discovered the site and directed the first excavations from 1967 until 1974. The results of these works were published in 1980 by Barandiaran in Obras Completas, T. XVIII. Barandiaran noted the presence of 9 different layers at the site, 5 of which contained Mousterian lithic artifacts. Jose Maria Basabe studied 5 teeth from a young Neanderthal found on the site. Jesus Altuna identified faunal remains from the site, while later on, A. Baldeón studied the stone tools.

Renewed excavations at Axlor took place from 2000 to 2009, under the direction of J. González Urquijo and J. Ibañez Estévez. The new excavations continue to focus on the lithic and faunal assemblages, as well as human remains, but new approaches have also been incorporated into the project: micro-faunal fossil remains (essentially, rodents), the geological context of the "Indusi karst", the geological formation of different layers of rock, palynology (the study of pollen), and carpology (the study of other plant remains), among other disciplines.

== The site ==
Axlor has a sequence of Middle Paleolithic levels, representing the later stages of the Mousterian in the Pyrenees region. The most recent levels at Axlor are dated to approximately 42,000 years before present (using C14 radiocarbon analysis). Axlor is one of few securely-dated late Middle Palaeolithic sites in the Basque region.

The Neanderthals from Axlor had long-range strategies to deal with their environment, which they changed over time – thus allowing a sort of "history" to be pieced together by archaeologists. Those investigations are changing the idea of Neanderthal being a "brute" or an "archaic hominid".

The Neanderthals of Axlor made stone tools using flint from distant places (between 30 and 60 kilometers from the site). Also, each different stone-class was worked with different techniques, using those systems more appropriated to its size, density, grain and hardness. The producing techniques are quite complicated (Levallois, micro-Levallois, Quina, etc.). Those strategies of flint-working and stone-working are not repeated along the time sequence. They change between layers, probably adapted to different ethnic traditions and to the needs of the Neanderthals and the environmental constraints. Some spear-tips found in Axlor have traces of use, and they were probably used as projectiles. The Neanderthals from Axlor were really good hunters, and they killed adult bovids and other dangerous animals. Their long-range strategies extended to the management of hunting resources, butchery, and use of animal resources.
