= Otxandio =

Coordinates: 43°2′31″N 2°29′17″W

- Municipality
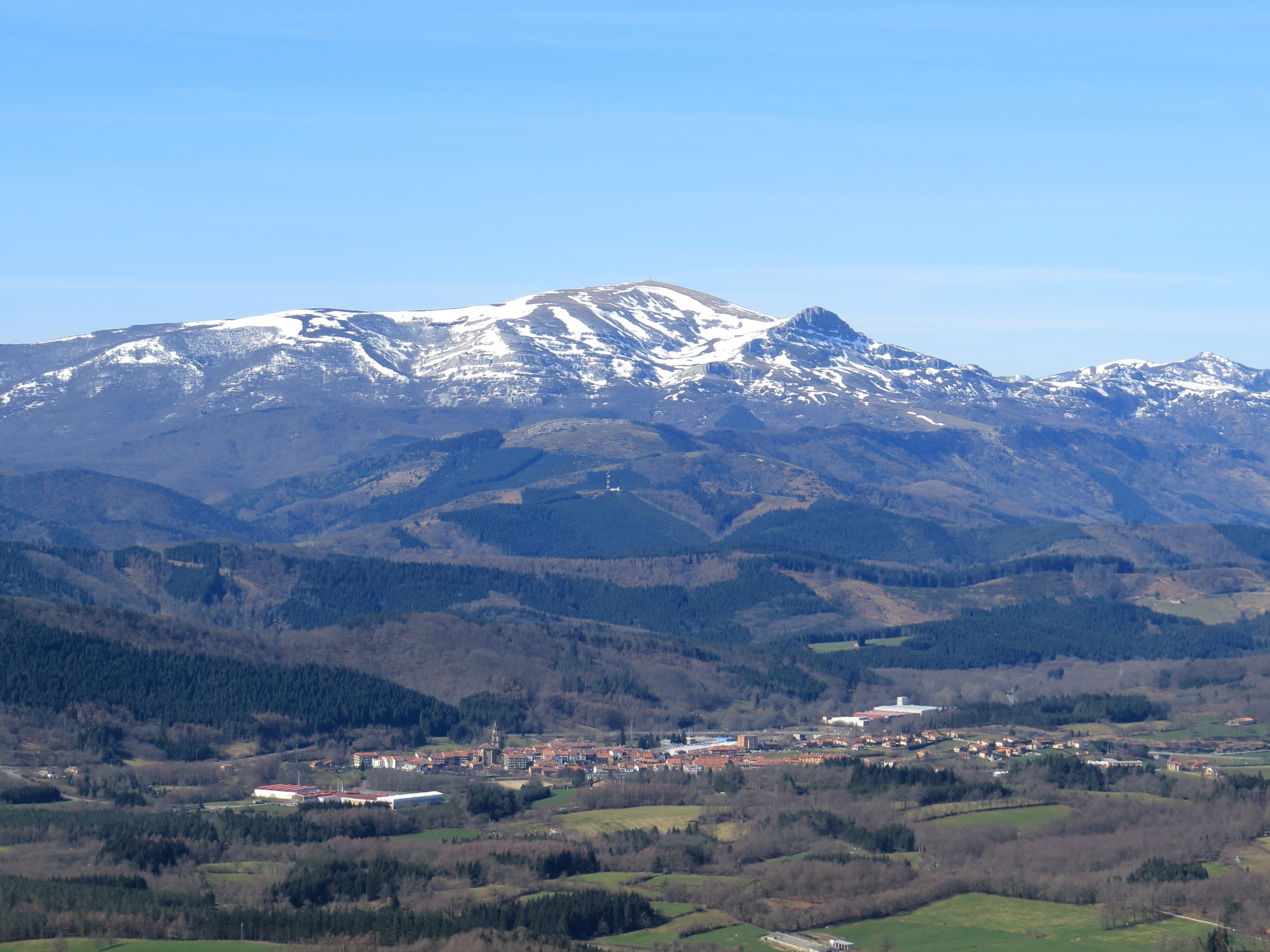
- Otxandio with the Gorbea mountain in the background

- Coat of arms

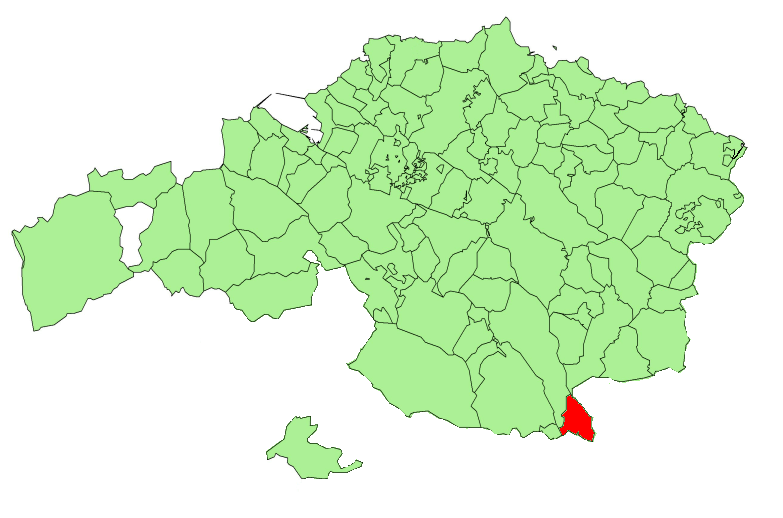
- Location of Otxandio in Biscay.
- Country: Spain
- Autonomous community: País Vasco
- Province: Biscay
- Comarca: Durangaldea
- Established: Not known

Government
  - Mayor: Santi Uribe (Bildu)

Area
  - Total: 1,243 km^{2} (480 sq mi)
- Elevation: 554 m (1,818 ft)

Population (2025-01-01)
  - Total: 1,322
  - Density: 1.064/km^{2} (2.755/sq mi)
- Demonym: Otxanditarra
- Time zone: UTC+1 (CET)
  - Summer (DST): UTC+2 (CEST)
- Postal code: 48210
- Website: Official website

Otxandio (in Basque and officially, in Spanish Ochandiano) is a town and municipality located in the province of Biscay, in the Basque autonomous community, Spain. Otxandio is part of the comarca of Durangaldea and has a population of 1,269 inhabitants as of 2010 according to the Spanish National Statistics Institute.

== Toponymy ==
The name of the town is documented for the first time in the 12th century. However, it would not be considered a town until the 18th century. The name in Spanish, Ochandiano is an anthroponym formed by a name and the -ano suffix, of Latin origin, probably from the evolution of the suffix -anum. The origin of the word seems to come from the Basque words Ochoa Handia, that may be translated as "big wolf".

The name in Basque, Otxandio comes from the phonetic evolution of the Spanish variation, Ochandiano, given due to the loss of the intervocalic n; from Ochandiano to Ochandiao and then Ochandio. Then, the adaptation to the Basque orthographic rules changes Ochandio to Otxandio.

Since 1984, the official name of the municipality is Otxandio.

== History ==
=== Spanish Civil War ===
Early in the Spanish Civil War, on 22 July 1936, Otxandio was bombed by two Nationalist Breguet XIX bombers, which attacked the main square during the celebration of the "fiestas de Santa María" killing 57-61 people, almost all of them civilians.

== Geography ==
Otxandio serves during centuries as the port of entry of Biscay from Álava. It is located at the southernmost part of the province and limits with Abadiño at north, Dima at north and west, Ubide at southwest and the province of Álava at south.

== Notable people ==
- Athletic Bilbao left-back Koikili Lertxundi was born in Otxandio.
- Bishop Victor Garaygordóbil Berrizbeitia, Prelate Emeritus of the Roman Catholic Diocese of Babahoyo, Ecuador, was born in Otxandio.
