= Zeberio =

Zeberio Ceberio
- Municipality
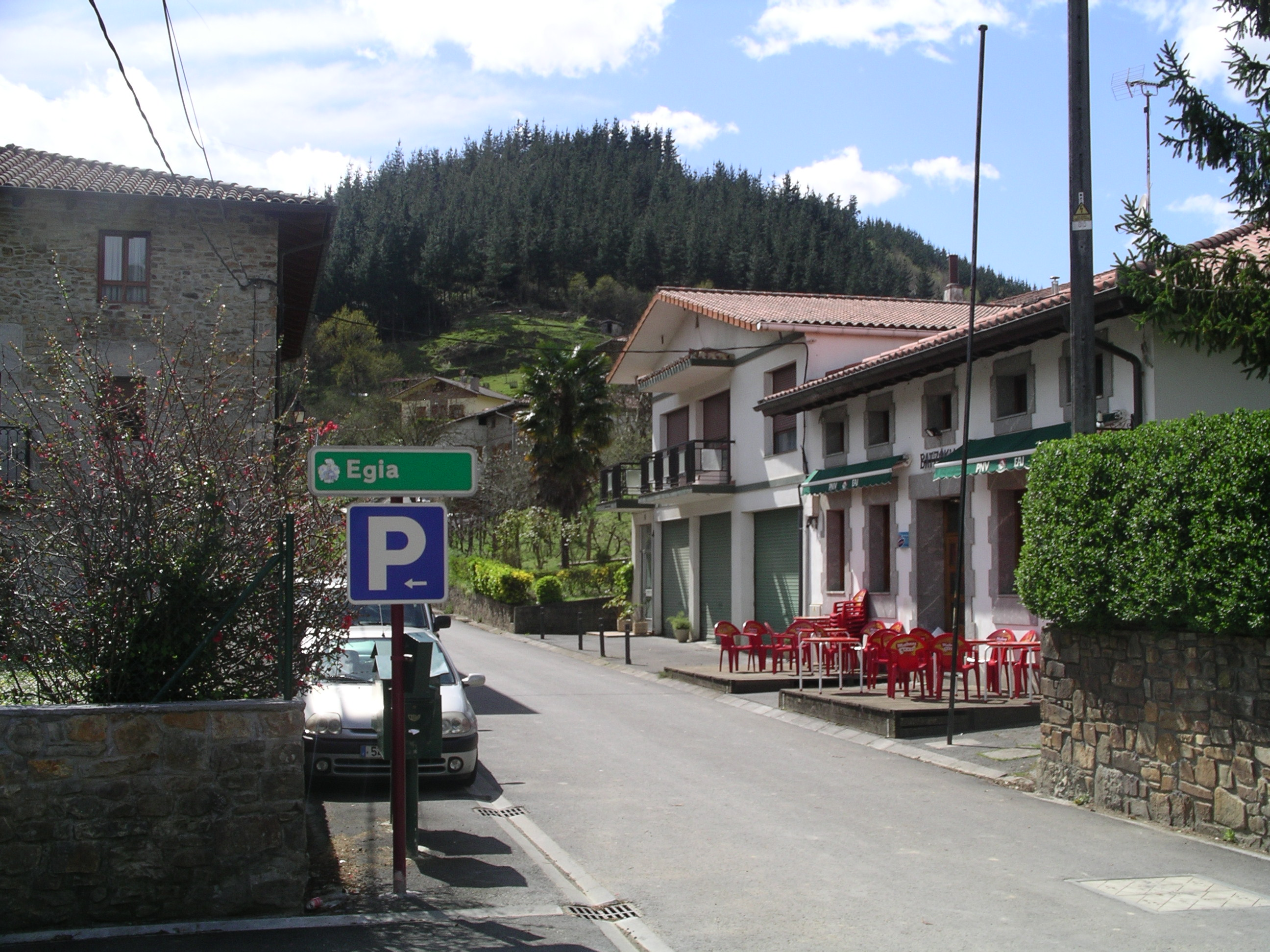

- Coat of arms

- Location of Zeberio within the Basque Country Location of Zeberio within Spain
- Coordinates: 43°8′48″N 2°51′8″W
- Country: Spain
- Autonomous community: Basque Country
- Province: Biscay
- Eskualdea: Arratia-Nerbioi

Government
  - Mayor: Karlos Idirin Gorrotxategi (EAJ-PNV)

Area
  - Total: 47.15 km^{2} (18.20 sq mi)

Population (2025-01-01)
  - Total: 1,087
  - Density: 23.05/km^{2} (59.71/sq mi)
- Demonym: zeberiotarra
- Time zone: UTC+1 (CET)
  - Summer (DST): UTC+2 (CEST)
- Postal code: 20110

Zeberio (Spanish: Ceberio) is a municipality located in the province of Biscay, in the autonomous community of Basque Country, northern Spain.
