= Orozko =

Orozko Orozco
- Municipality
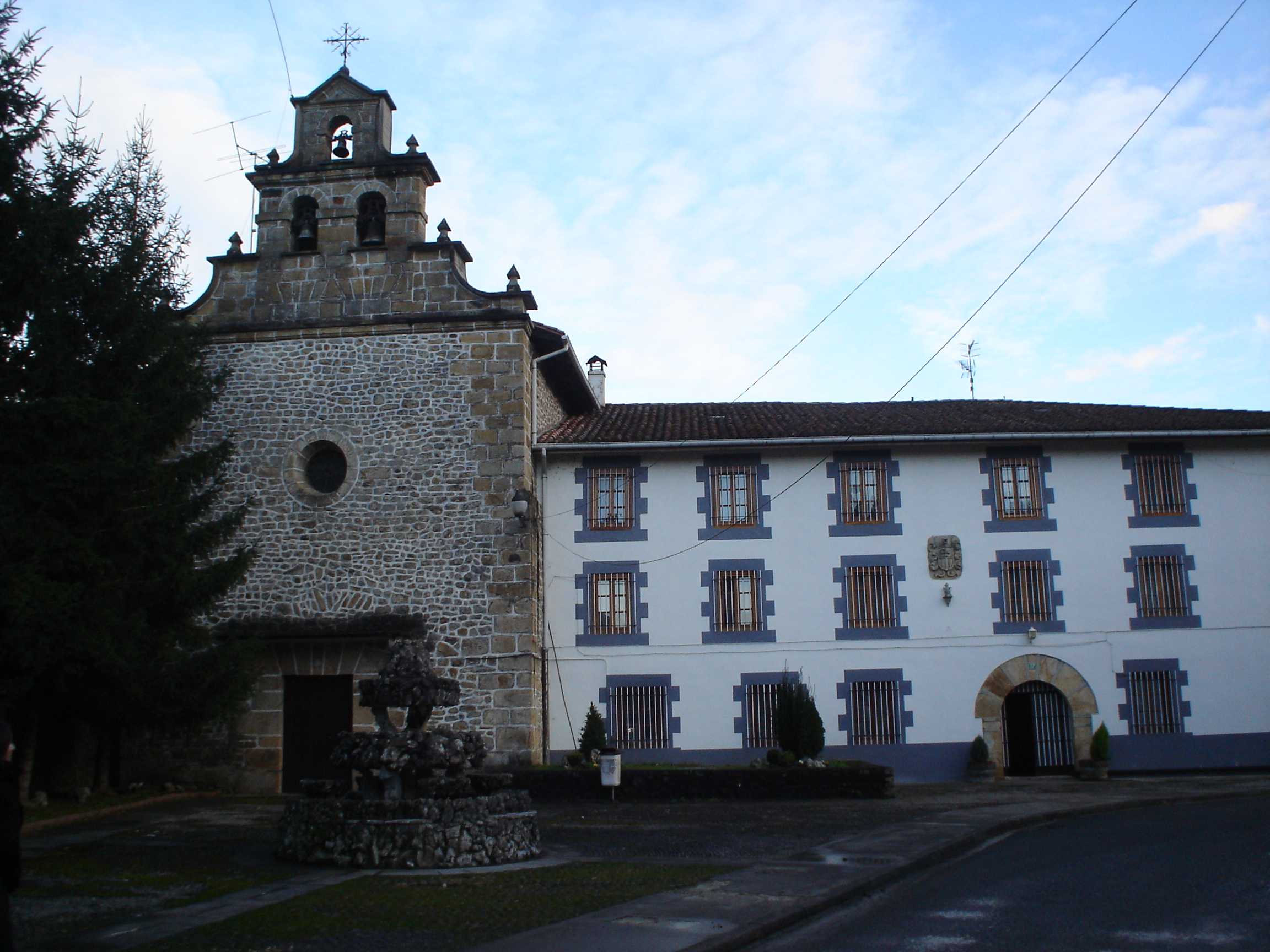
- Convent in the heighborhood of Ibarra

- Flag Coat of arms

- Location of Orozko within the Basque Country Location of Orozko within Spain
- Coordinates: 43°6′31″N 2°54′40″W
- Country: Spain
- Autonomous community: Basque Country
- Province: Biscay
- Eskualdea: Arratia-Nerbioi

Area
  - Total: 10,242 km^{2} (3,954 sq mi)

Population (2025-01-01)
  - Total: 2,666
  - Density: 0.2603/km^{2} (0.6742/sq mi)
- (INE)
- Demonym: orozkoarra
- Time zone: UTC+1 (CET)
  - Summer (DST): UTC+2 (CEST)
- Postal code: 48410

Orozko is a town and municipality located in the province of Biscay, in the autonomous community of Basque Country in northern Spain.
