= Bedia, Spain =

Bedia
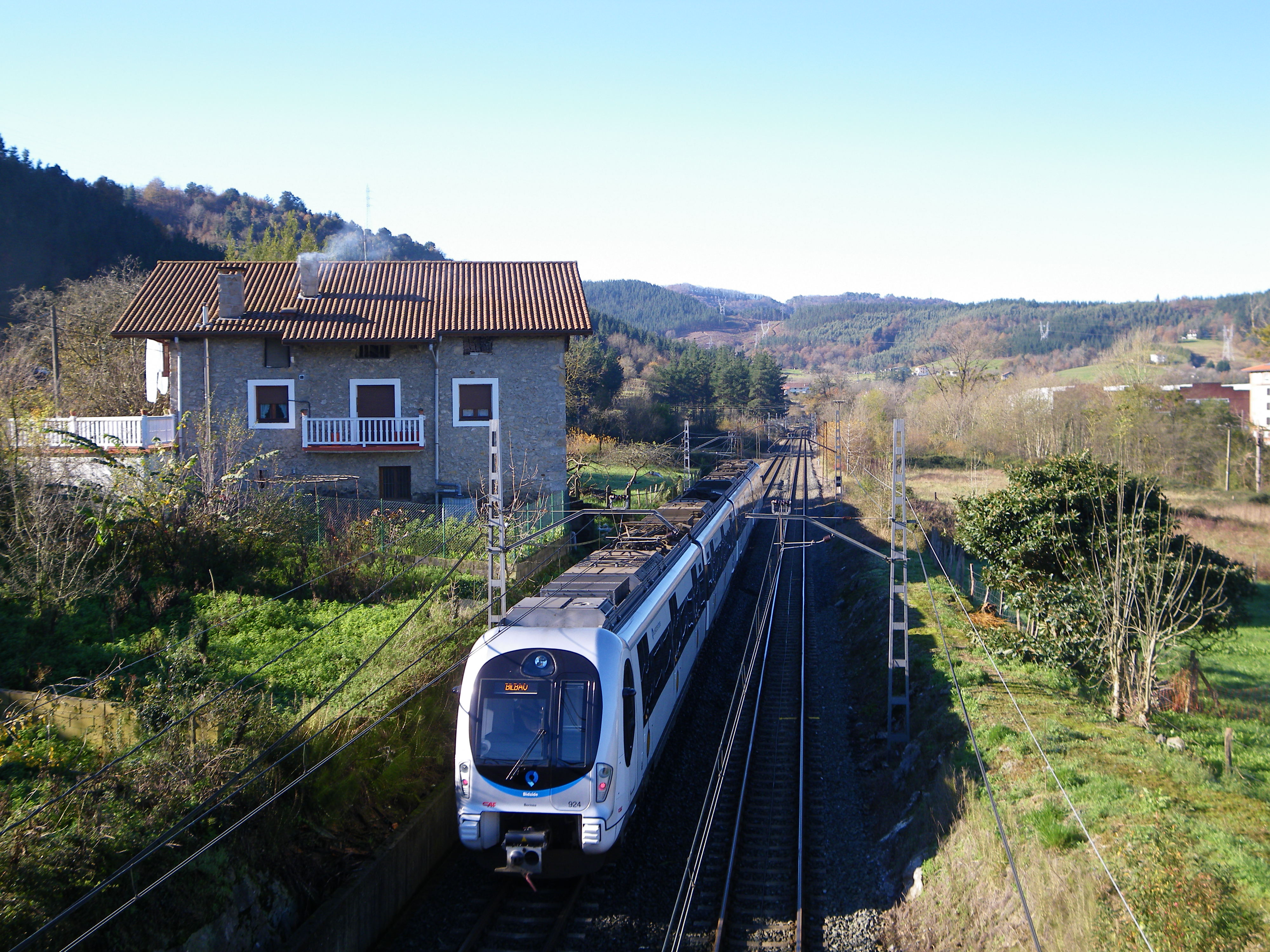
- A train in the Barroeta district of the municipality of Bedia

- Flag Coat of arms

- Location of Bedia within the Basque Country Location of Bedia within Spain
- Coordinates: 43°12′29″N 2°48′7″W
- Country: Spain
- Autonomous community: Basque Country
- Province: Biscay
- Comarca: Arratia-Nerbioi

Area
  - Total: 16.5 km^{2} (6.4 sq mi)
- Elevation: 62 m (203 ft)

Population (2025-01-01)
  - Total: 1,111
  - Density: 67.3/km^{2} (174/sq mi)
- Time zone: UTC+1 (CET)
  - Summer (DST): UTC+2 (CEST)
- Postal code: 48390
- Website: www.bedia.biz

Bedia is a town and municipality located in the province of Biscay, in the autonomous community of Basque Country, northern Spain.
