= Arrankudiaga =

- Municipality
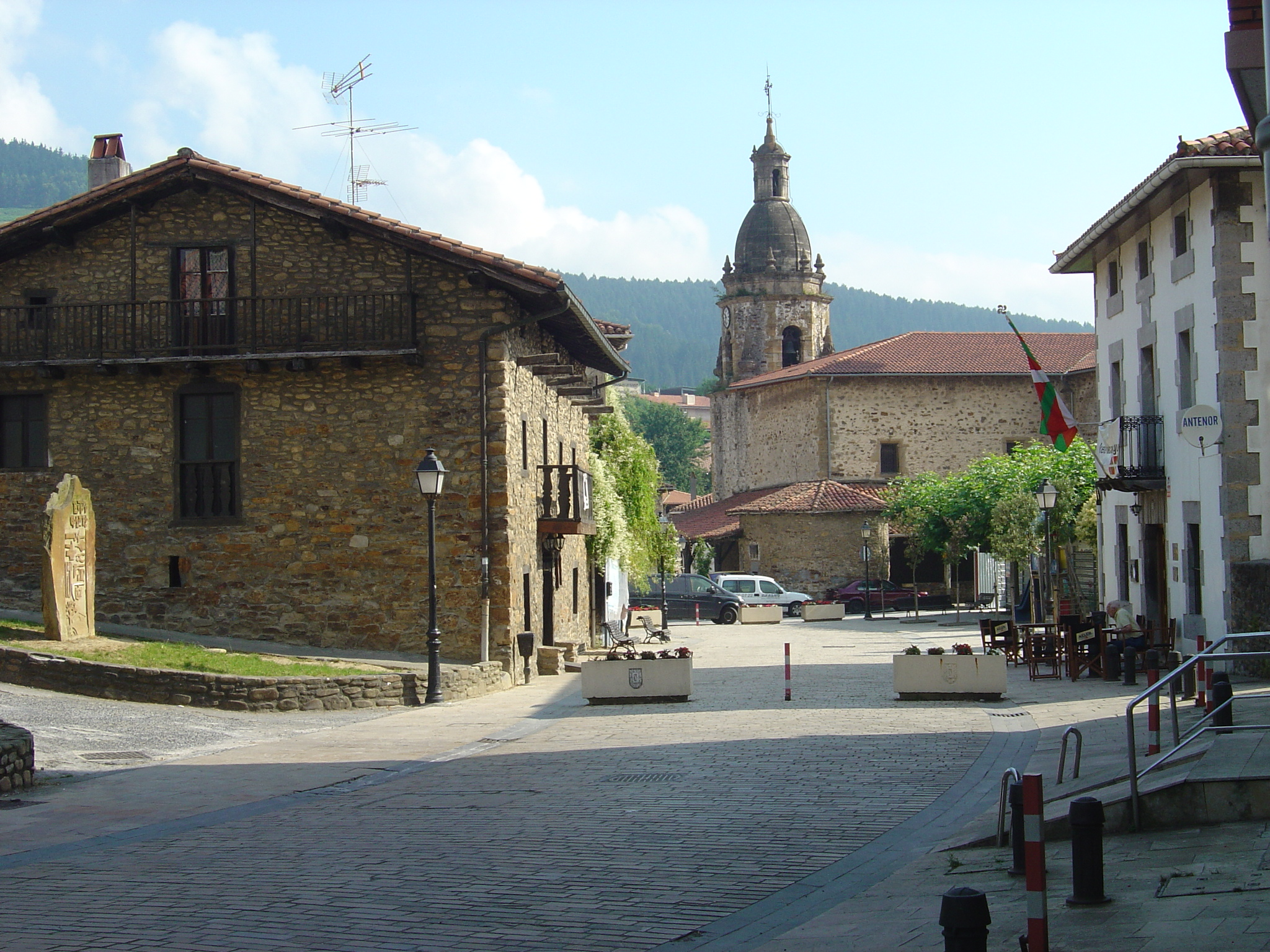

- Coat of arms

- Location of Arrankudiaga within the Basque Country
- Coordinates: 43°10′25″N 2°55′10″W
- Country: Spain
- Autonomous community: Basque Country
- Province: Biscay
- Comarca: Arratia-Nerbioi

Government
  - Mayor: Itziar Duandikoetxea González (EH Bildu)

Area
  - Total: 22.75 km^{2} (8.78 sq mi)
- Elevation: 93 m (305 ft)

Population (2025-01-01)
  - Total: 1,018
  - Density: 44.75/km^{2} (115.9/sq mi)
- Demonym: Basque: arrankudiagarra
- Time zone: UTC+1 (CET)
  - Summer (DST): UTC+2 (CEST)
- Postal code: 48498
- Official language(s): Basque; Spanish
- Website: Official website

Arrankudiaga is a town and municipality located in the province of Biscay, in the autonomous community of Basque Country, northern Spain.
