= Arakaldo =

- Municipality
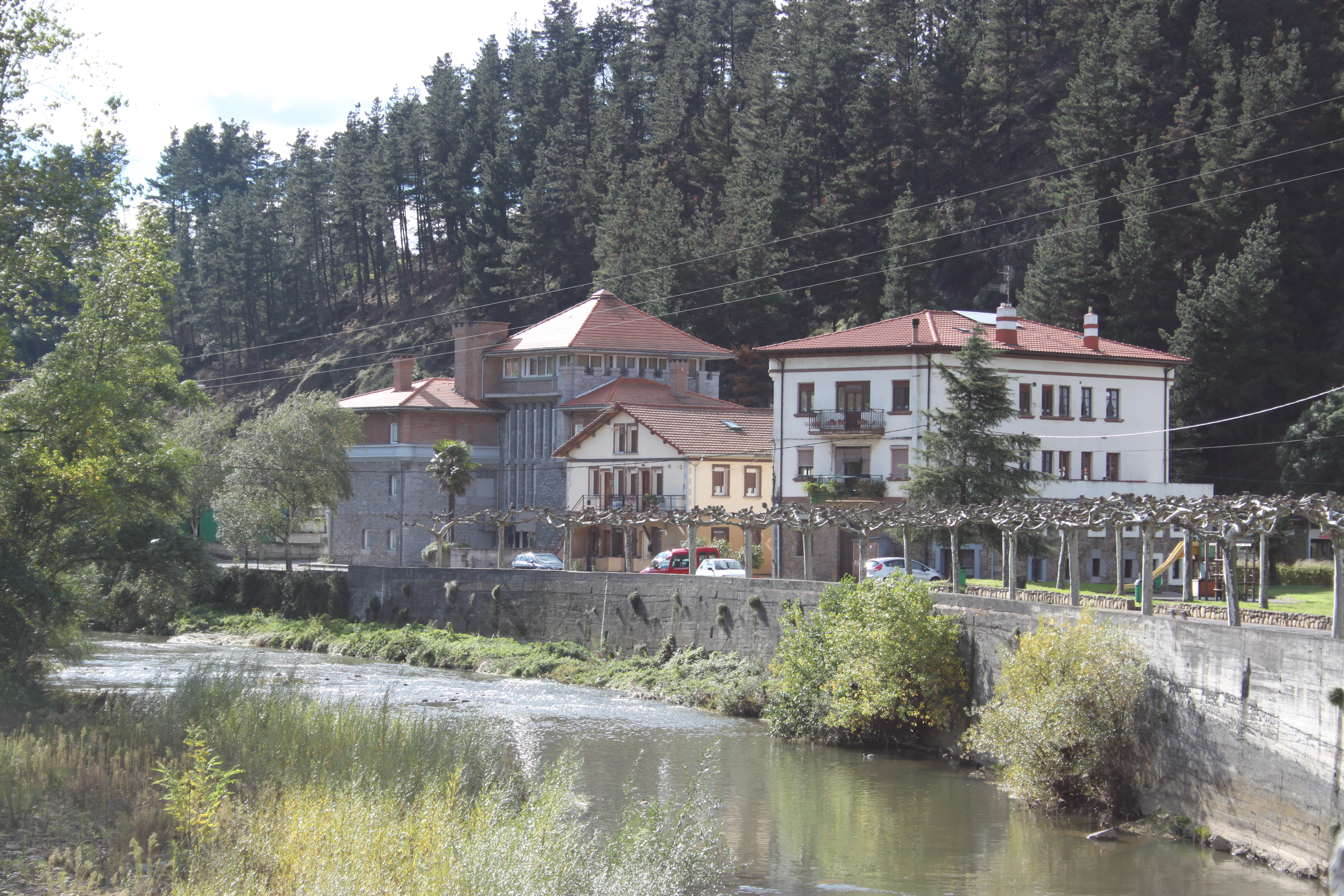
- Partial view of Arakaldo

- Coat of arms

- Location of Arakaldo within the Basque Country
- Coordinates: 43°09′11″N 2°56′08″W
- Country: Spain
- Autonomous community: Basque Country
- Province: Biscay
- Comarca: Arratia-Nerbioi

Government
  - Mayor: Jabi Asurmendi Sanz (EH Bildu)

Area
  - Total: 2.63 km^{2} (1.02 sq mi)
- Elevation: 150 m (490 ft)

Population (2025-01-01)
  - Total: 156
  - Density: 59.3/km^{2} (154/sq mi)
- Demonym(s): Basque: arakaldarra Spanish: aracaldés
- Time zone: UTC+1 (CET)
  - Summer (DST): UTC+2 (CEST)
- Postal code: 48498
- Official language(s): Basque; Spanish
- Website: Official website

Arakaldo is a town and municipality located in the province of Biscay, in the autonomous community of Basque Country, northern Spain.
