= Ugao-Miraballes =

Coordinates: 43°10′53″N 2°54′1″W

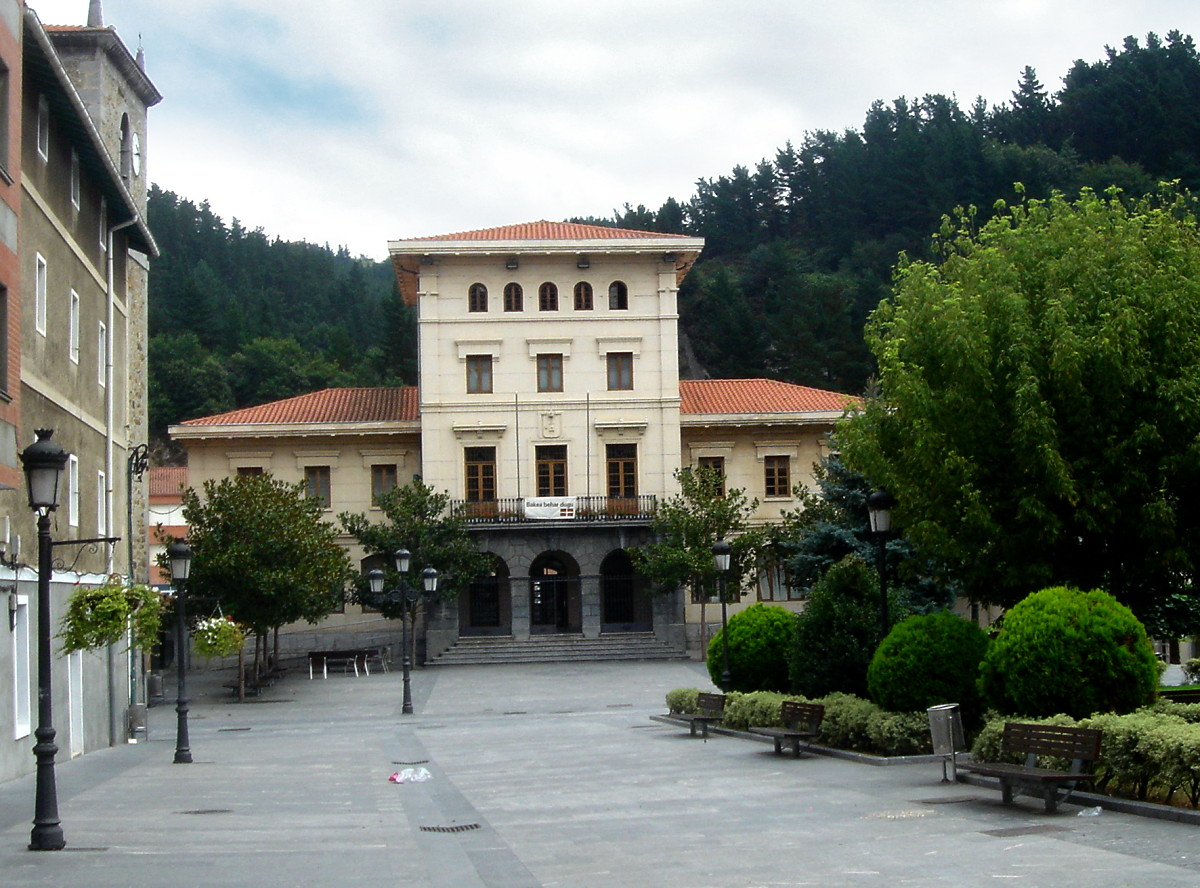
- Ugao town hall

- Flag Coat of arms

- Location in Spain.
- Country: Spain
- Autonomous community: Biscay

Area
  - Total: 4.54 km^{2} (1.75 sq mi)
- Elevation: 70 m (230 ft)

Population (2025-01-01)
  - Total: 4,213
  - Density: 928/km^{2} (2,400/sq mi)
- Time zone: UTC+1 (CET)
  - Summer (DST): UTC+2 (CEST)
- Website: www.ugao-miraballes.eus

Ugao-Miraballes (official and Basque language name; informally in Spanish: Miravalles) is a town and municipality in the province of Biscay and autonomous community of the Basque Country in northern Spain.
