= Areatza =

Areatza Villaro
- Municipality
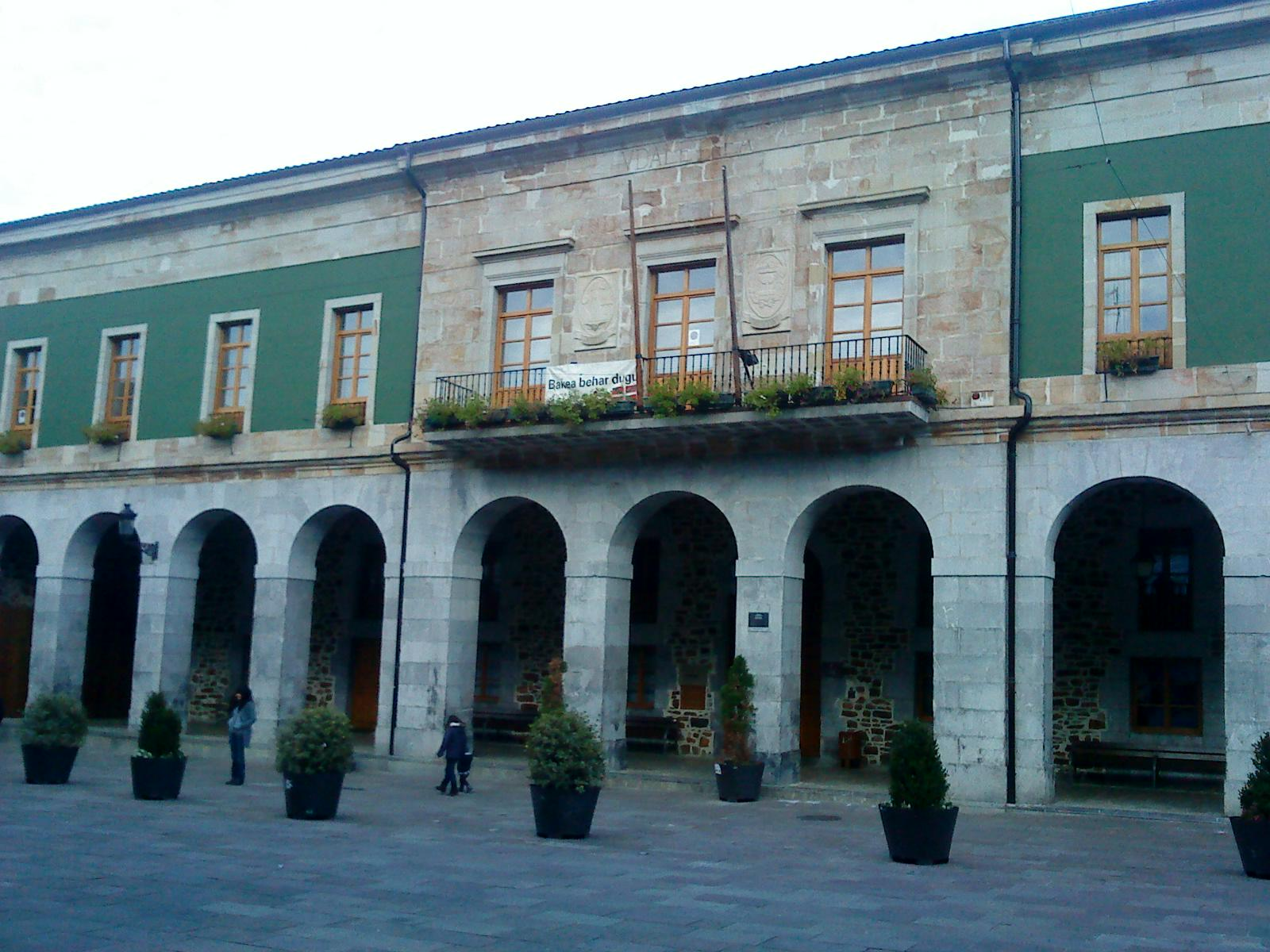
- Town hall of Areatza

- Flag Coat of arms

- Location of Areatza within the Basque Country Areatza (Spain)
- Coordinates: 43°07′15″N 2°46′10″W
- Country: Spain
- Autonomous community: Basque Country
- Province: Biscay
- Comarca: Arratia-Nerbioi
- Founded: 1338

Government
  - Mayor: Asier García Artetxe (EH Bildu)

Area
  - Total: 9.10 km^{2} (3.51 sq mi)
- Elevation: 140 m (460 ft)

Population (2025-01-01)
  - Total: 1,292
  - Density: 142/km^{2} (368/sq mi)
- Demonym: Basque: areatzarra
- Time zone: UTC+1 (CET)
  - Summer (DST): UTC+2 (CEST)
- Postal code: 48143
- Official language(s): Basque; Spanish
- Website: Official website

Areatza (in Basque and officially; in Spanish, Villaro) is a town and municipality located in the province of Biscay, in the autonomous community of Basque Country, northern Spain.
