= Biscay =

Province of Spain

Biscay Bizkaia (Basque) Vizcaya (Spanish)
- Province
- Historical Territory of Biscay^{1}
- Flag Coat of arms

- Location of the Province of Biscay in Spain
- Coordinates: 43°15′43″N 2°55′56″W
- Country: Spain
- Autonomous community: Basque Country
- Capital: Bilbao

Government
  - Deputy General: Elixabete Etxanobe (PNV)

Area
  - Total: 2,215.55 km^{2} (855.43 sq mi)
  - Rank: 48th in Spain

Population (2025)
  - Total: 1,167,233
  - Rank: 11th in Spain
  - Density: 526.837/km^{2} (1,364.50/sq mi)
- Demonyms: Biscayne, Biscayan, bizkaitar(ra), vizcaíno/a
- Time zone: UTC+1
  - Summer (DST): UTC+2
- Postal code: 48
- Official languages: Basque • Spanish
- Parliament: Juntas Generales
- Congress seats: 8
- Senate seats: 4
- Juntas Generales de Vizcaya: 51
- Website: Diputación Foral de Vizcaya
- 1. Complete official names: Bizkaiko Lurralde Historikoa (Basque) and Territorio Histórico de Bizkaia (Spanish)

The Province of Biscay (/ˈbɪskeɪ, ˈbɪski/ BISK-ay, BISK-ee; Basque: Bizkaia [bis̻kai.a]; Spanish: Vizcaya [biθˈkaʝa]) is a province of the Basque Autonomous Community, heir of the ancient Lordship of Biscay, lying on the south shore of the eponymous bay. The capital and largest city is Bilbao.

The province is one of the most renowned and prosperous provinces of Spain, historically a major trading hub in the Atlantic Ocean since medieval times and, later on, one of the largest industrial and financial centers of the Iberian Peninsula. Since the extensive deindustrialization that took place throughout the 1970s, the economy has come to rely more on the services sector.

With a population of 1,167,233, it is the 11th most populous province of Spain, which in an area of 2,215.55 square kilometres (855.43 sq mi), the 4th-smallest of all provinces, which results in a population density of 526.8367/km^{2} (1,364.501/sq mi), only surpassed by the ones of Madrid and Barcelona.

== Etymology ==
Linguists (Koldo Mitxelena, etc.) accept that Bizkaia is a cognate of bizkar (cf. Biscarrosse in Aquitaine), meaning 'low ridge' or 'prominence'. Both place-name variants are well-attested both within and outside of the whole Basque Country. Iheldo bizchaya was attested in 1141 for the Monte Igueldo in San Sebastián.

== Names ==
=== Bizkaia ===
Bizkaia is the official name, and it is used on official documents and national media. It is also the name used in the Basque version of the Spanish constitution, and of the Statute of Autonomy of the Basque Country.

Bizkaia is the only official name in Spanish or Basque approved for the historical territory by the General Council of the province and the Spanish laws.

=== Vizcaya ===
Vizcaya is the hispanized modulation for the given name, used in non-official documents, as recommended by the Royal Spanish Academy. It is also the co-official name used in the Spanish version of the Constitution, as well as in the Statute of Autonomy of the Basque Country.

== History ==
Biscay has been inhabited since the Middle Paleolithic, as attested by the archaeological remains and cave paintings found in its many caves. The Roman presence had little impact in the region, and the Basque language and traditions have survived to this day.

According to Anton Erkoreka, the Vikings had a commercial base there from which they were expelled by 825. Mundaka is likely a Viking name, and the ria of Mundaka is the easiest route to the river Ebro and at the end of it, the Mediterranean Sea and trade.

The first time Biscay is mentioned with that name (in Latin in the forms Bizkai and Bizcai) is in the Chronicle of Alfonso III in the late 9th century, which tells of the regions repopulated under orders of Alfonso I, and how some territories "owned by their own", among them Biscay, were not affected by these repopulations. Biscay is mentioned again in the 10th-century Códice de Roda, which narrates the wedding between Velazquita, daughter of Sancho I of Pamplona, to Munio Velaz, Count of Álava, in Biscay. It is recorded in 1070 in a donation act to the monastery of Bickaga, located on the ria of Mundaka.

It is considered then, that Biscay was by this period controlled by the Kingdom of Navarre. It then became autonomous and finally a part of the Crown of Castile, as the Lordship of Biscay.

In the modern age, the province became a major commercial and industrial area. Its prime harbour of Bilbao soon became the main Castilian gateway to Europe. Later, in the 19th and 20th centuries, the abundance of prime quality iron ore and the lack of feudal castes favored rapid industrialization.

=== Paleolithic ===
==== Middle Paleolithic ====
The first evidence of human dwellings (Neanderthal people) in Biscay happens in this period of prehistory. Mousterian artifacts have been found in three sites in Biscay: Benta Laperra (Karrantza); Kurtzia (Getxo); and Murua (Durangoaldea).

==== Late Paleolithic ====
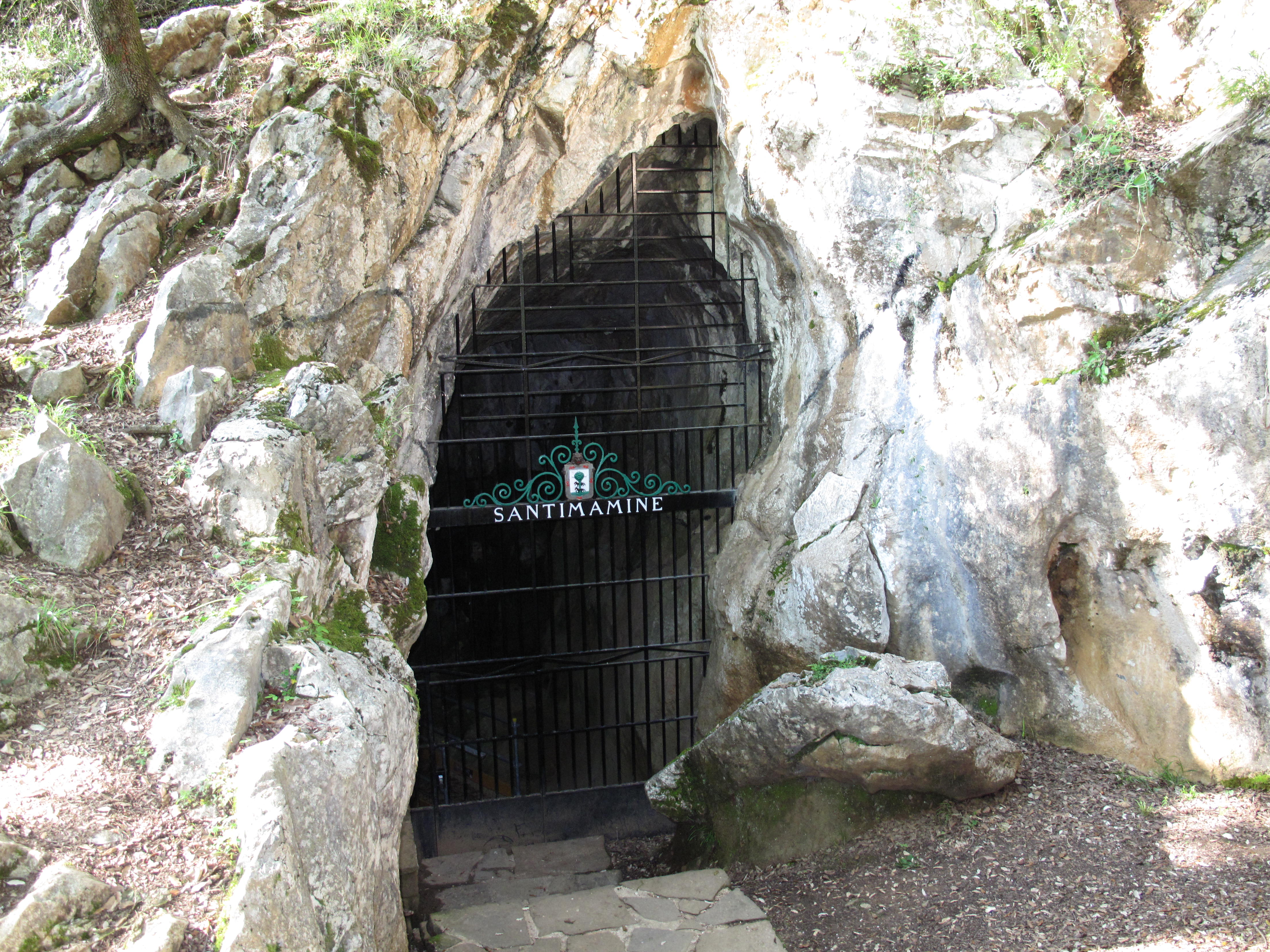
Entrance of Santimamiñe cave, in Busturialdea.

Chatelperronian culture (normally associated with Neanderthals as well) can be found in Santimamiñe cave (Kortezubi).

The most important settlements by anatomically modern humans (H. sapiens) can be considered the following:

- Aurignacian culture: Benta Laperra, Kurztia, and Lumentxa (Lekeitio)
- Gravettian culture: Santimamiñe, Bolinkoba (Durangoaldea) and Atxurra (Markina)
- Solutrean culture: Santimamiñe and Bolinkoba
- Magdalenian culture: Santimamiñe and Lumentxa

Paleolithic art is also present. The Benta Laperra cave has the oldest paintings, maybe from the Aurignacian or Solutrean period. Bison and bear are the animals depicted, together with abstract signs. The murals of Arenaza (Galdames) and Santimamiñe were created in later periods (Magdalenian). In Arenaza, female deer are the dominant motif; Santimamiñe features bison, horses, goats, and deer.

==== Epi-Paleolithic ====
This period (also called Mesolithic sometimes) is dominated in Biscay by the Azilian culture. Tools become smaller and more refined and, while hunting remains, fishing and seafood gathering become more important; there is evidence of consumption of wild fruits as well. Santimamiñe is one of the most important sites of this period. Others are Arenaza, Atxeta (not far from Santimamiñe), Lumentxa and nearby Urtiaga, and Santa Catalina, together with Bolinkoba and neighbour Silibranka.

=== Neolithic ===
While the first evidences of Neolithic contact in the Basque Country can be dated to the 4th millennium BCE, it was not until the beginning of the 3rd that the area accepted, gradually and without radical changes, the advances of agricultural cultivation and domestication of sheep. Biscay was not particularly affected by this change and only three sites can be mentioned for this period: Arenaza; Santimamiñe; and Kobeaga (Ea). The advances adopted seem limited initially to sheep, domestic goats, and very scarce pottery.

Together with Neolithic technologies, Megalithism also arrived. It was the most common form of burial (simple dolmen) until c. 1500 BCE.

=== Chalcolithic and Bronze Age ===
While open-air settlement started to become common as the population grew, they still used caves and natural shelters in Biscay in the Chalcolithic and Bronze Age. Hunting game became a less important source of protein, as the people relied on sheep, goats and some bovine cattle. Metallic tools became more common but stone-made ones were also used.

Pottery types showed great continuity (not decorated) until the bell beaker made its appearance.

The sites of this period now cover all the territory of Biscay, many being open air settlements, but the most important caves of the Paleolithic are still in use as well.

=== Iron Age ===
Few sites have been identified for this period. Caves are abandoned for the most part but they still reveal some remains. The main caves of prehistory (Arenaza, Santimamiñe, Lumentxa) were still inhabited.

=== Roman period ===
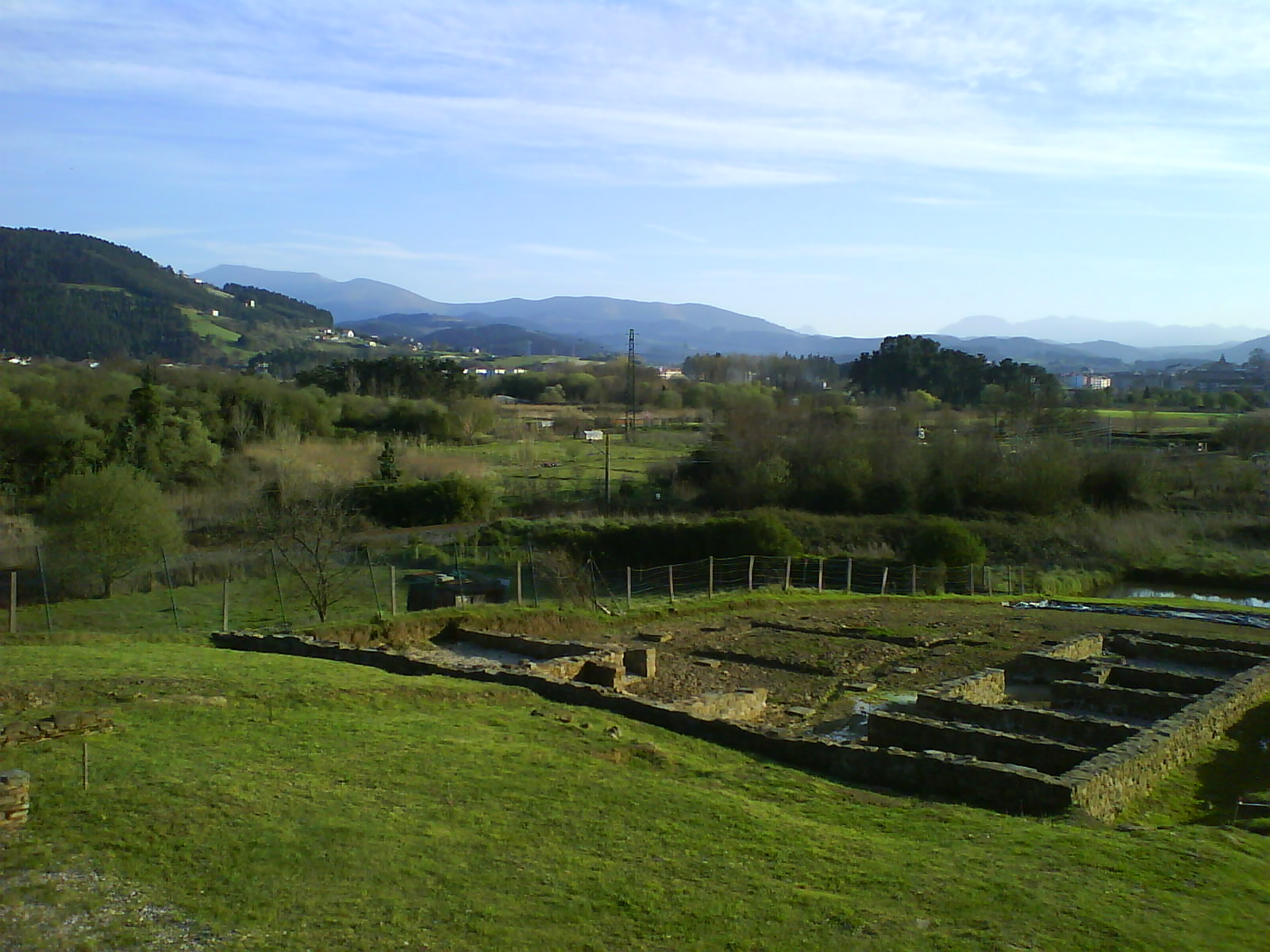
Roman town remains in Forua.

Roman geographers identified two tribes in the territory now known as Biscay: the Caristii and Autrigones. The Caristii dwelt in nuclear Biscay, east of the firth of Bilbao, extending also into Northern Araba and some areas of Gipuzkoa, up to the river Deba. The Autrigones dwelt in the westernmost part of Biscay and Araba, extending also into the provinces of Cantabria, Burgos and La Rioja. Based in toponymy, historical and archaeological evidence, it is thought that these tribes spoke the Basque language. The borders of the Biscayan dialect of Basque seem to be those of the Caristian territory, with an exception of the areas that have lost the old language.

No resistance to Roman occupation is indicated in any part of the Basque area (excepting Aquitaine) before the late feudalizing period. Roman sources mention several towns in the area, including Flaviobriga and Portus Amanus, although they have not been located. The site of Forua, near Gernika, has yielded archaeological evidence of Roman presence.

In the late Roman period, together with the rest of the Basque Country, Biscay seems to have revolted against Roman domination and the growing society organized by feudalism.

=== Middle Ages ===
In the Early Middle Ages, the history of Biscay cannot be separated from that of the Basque Country as a whole. The area was de facto independent although Visigoths and Franks attempted to assert their domination from time to time. Encounters between the Visigoths and Basques usually led to defeat for the latter. The Visigoths established an outlying post at the later city of Vitoria to counter incursions and the migration of Basques from the coastal regions to the north.

In 905, Leonese chronicles define for the first time the Kingdom of Pamplona as including all the western Basque provinces, as well as the Rioja region. The territories that would later constitute Biscay were included in that state.

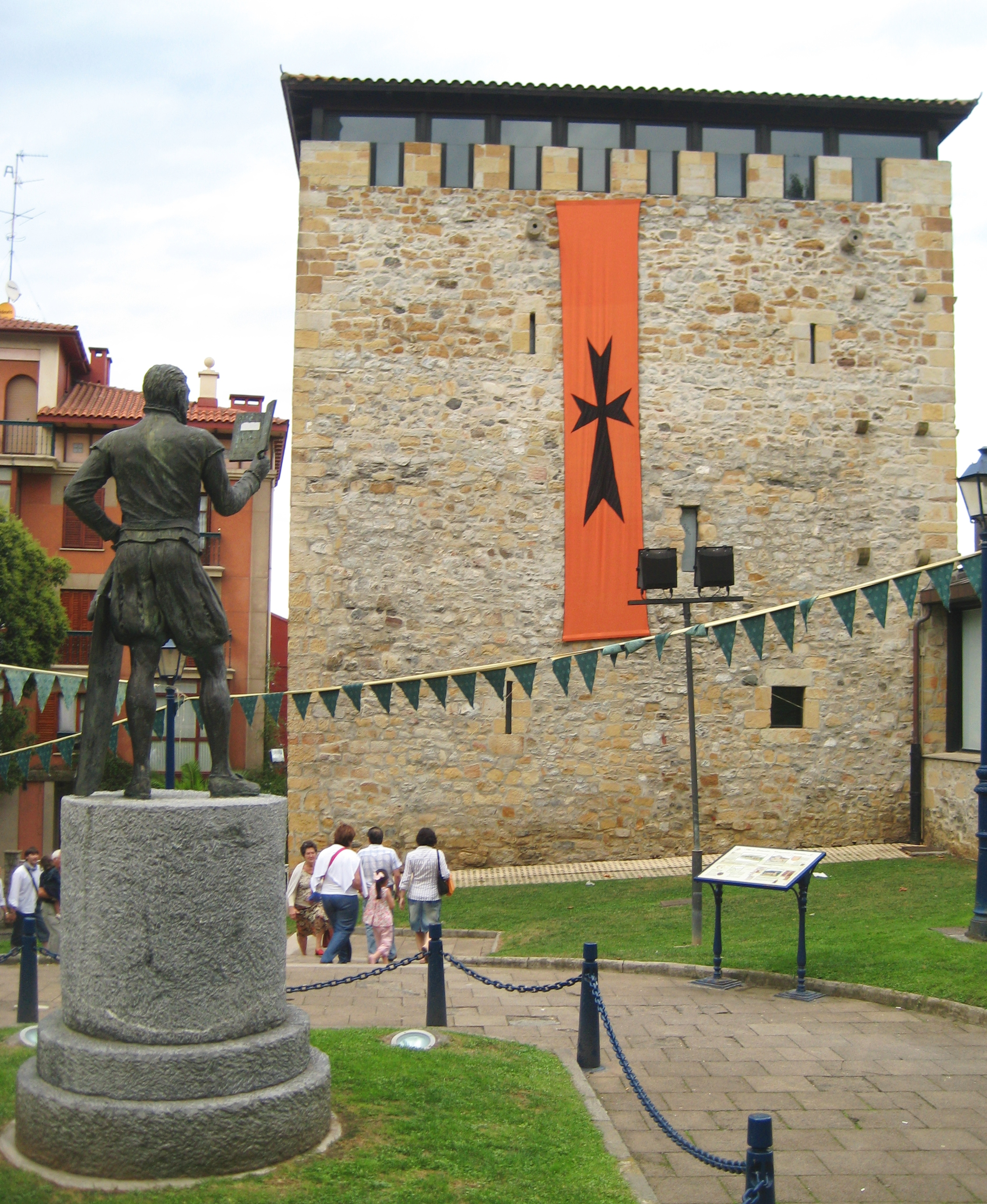
Monument to Lope García de Salazar (1399-1476), opposite one of his tower houses, in Portugalete.

In the conflicts that the newly sovereign Kingdom of Castile and Pamplona/Navarre had in the 11th and 12th century, the Castilians were supported by many landowners from La Rioja, who sought to consolidate their holdings under Castilian feudal law. These pro-Castilian lords were led by the house of Haro, who were eventually granted the rule of newly created Biscay, initially made up of the valleys of Uribe, Busturia, Markina, Zornotza, and Arratia, as well as several towns and the city of Urduina. It is unclear when this happened, but tradition says that Iñigo López was the first Lord of Biscay in 1043.

The title to the lordship was inherited by Iñigo López's descendants until, by inheritance, in 1370, it passed to John I of Castile. It became one of the titles of the king of Castile. Since then it remained connected to the crown, first to that of Castile and then, from Charles I, to that of Spain, as ruler of the Crown of Castile. It was conditioned on the lord swearing to defend and maintain the fuero (Biscayan laws, derived from Navarrese and Basque customary rights), which affirmed that the possessors of the sovereignty of the lordship were the Biscayans and that, at least in theory, they could refute the lord.

The lords and later the kings, came to swear the Statutes to the oak of Gernika, where the assembly of the Lordship sits.

=== Modern times ===
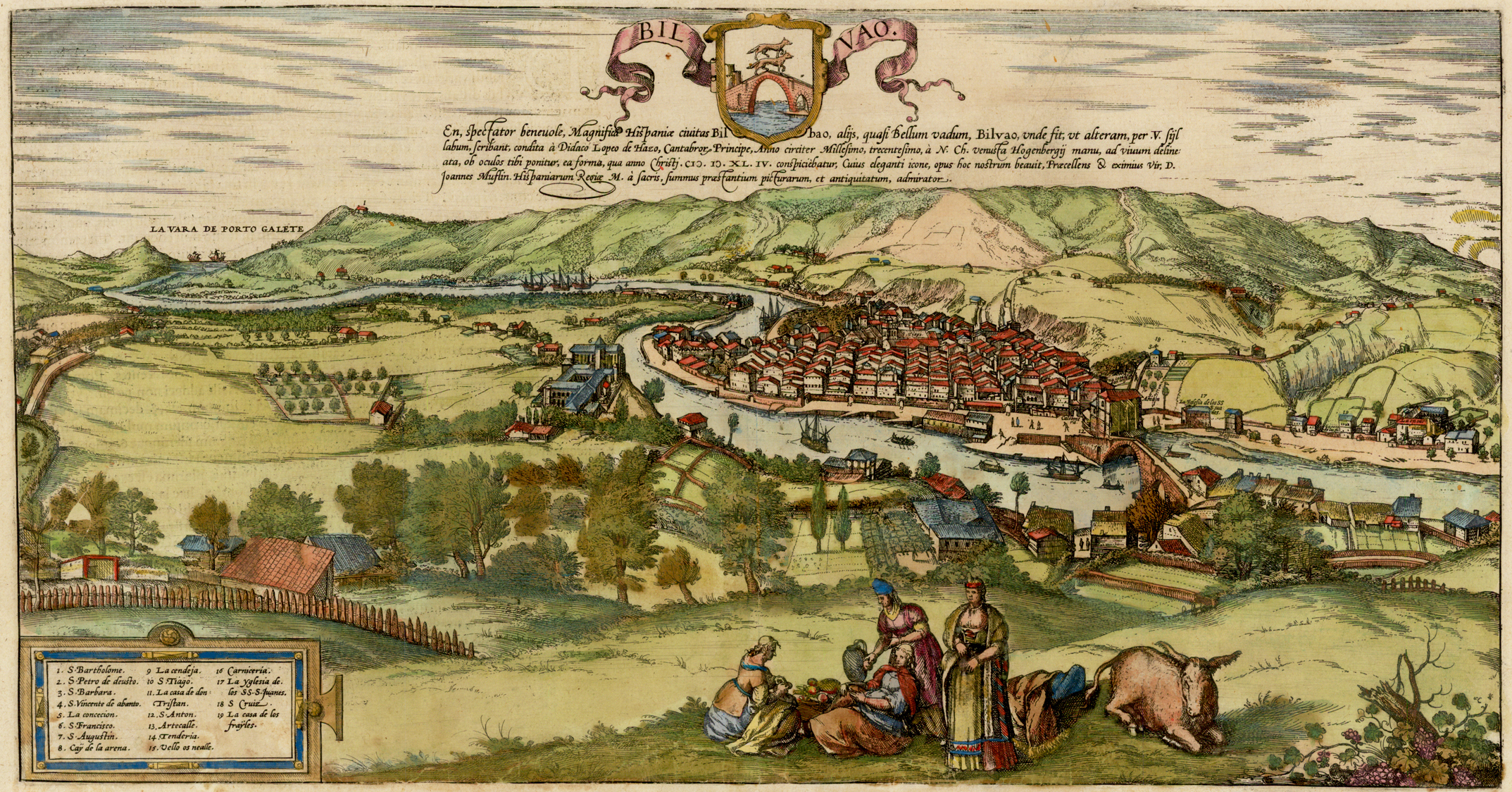
Bilbao (1575).

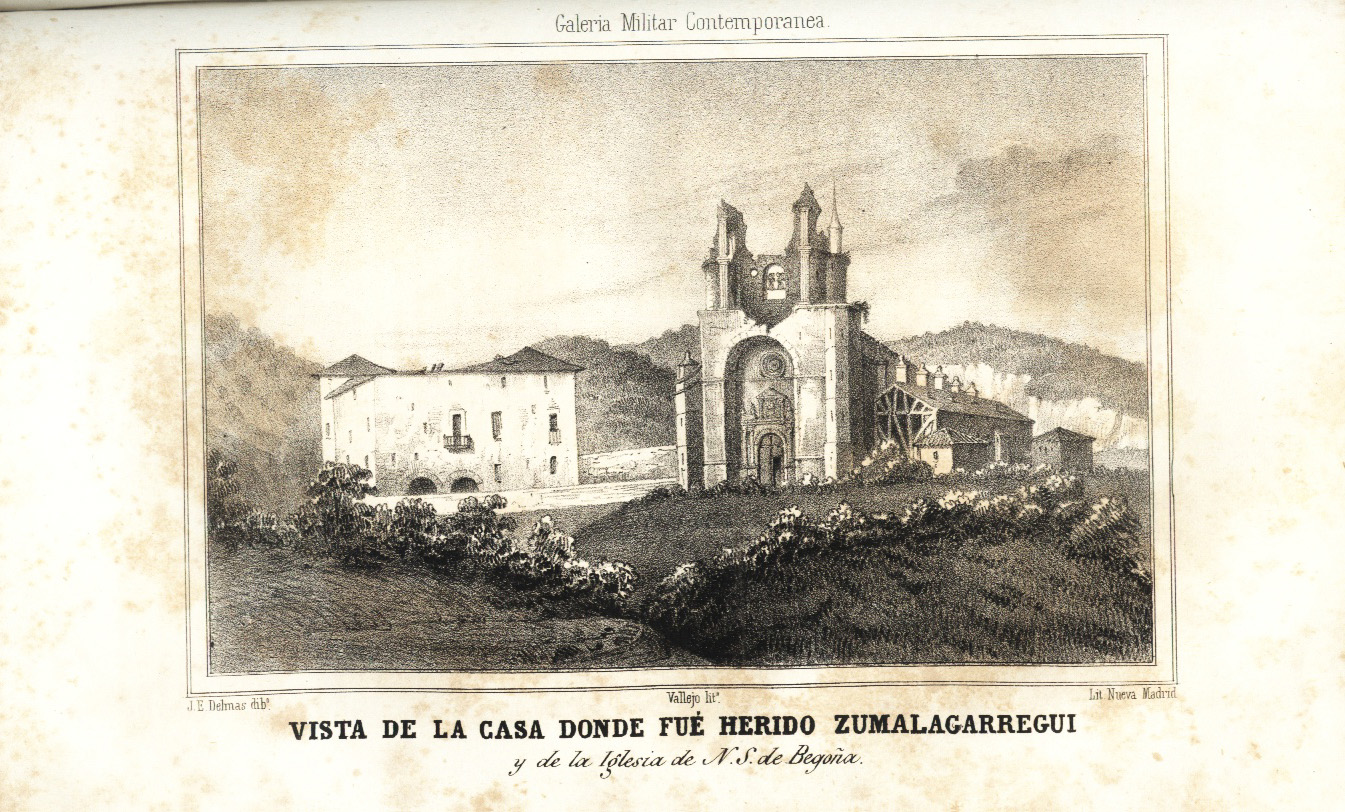
House where Carlist General Tomás de Zumalacárregui was hurt, and the Basilica of Begoña in 1835, after the Siege of Bilbao.

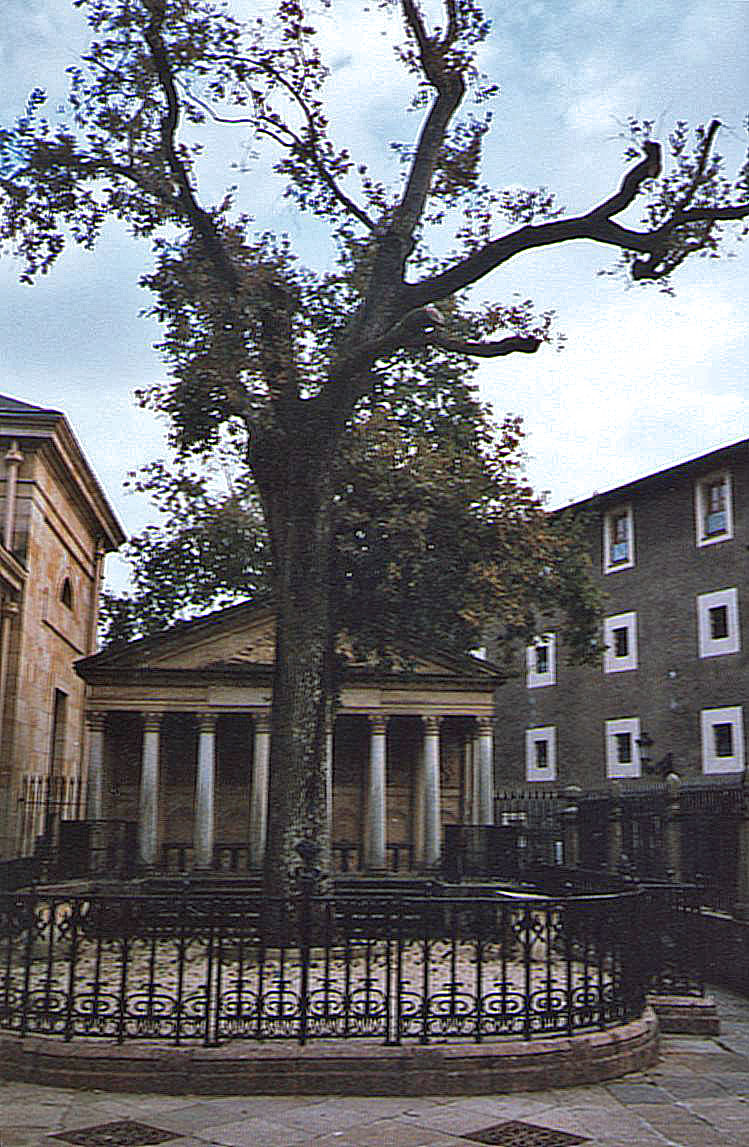
The historic Oak of Gernika, symbol of the Basque institutions.

In the modern ages commerce took on great importance, specially for the Port of Bilbao, to which the kings granted privileges in 1511 for trade with the ports of the Spanish Empire. Bilbao was already the main Castilian harbour, from where wool was shipped to Flanders, and other goods were imported.

In 1628, the separate territory of Durango was incorporated to Biscay. In the same century the so-called chartered municipalities west of Biscay were also incorporated in different dates, becoming another subdivision of Biscay: Encartaciones (Enkarterriak).

The coastal towns had a sizable fleet of their own, mostly dedicated to fishing and trade. Along with other Basque towns of Gipuzkoa and Labourd, they were largely responsible for the commercially extinction of North Atlantic right whales in the Bay of Biscay and of the first unstable settlement by Europeans in Newfoundland. They signed separate treaties with other powers, particularly England.

After the Napoleonic Wars, Biscay, along with the other Basque provinces, were threatened to have their self-rule cut by the now Liberal Spanish Cortes. Together with opposing factions that supported different parties for the throne, this desire to maintain foral rights contributed to the successive Carlist Wars. The Biscayan government and other Basque provinces supported Carlos V, who represented an autocratic monarch who would preserve tradition.

Many of the towns though, notably Bilbao, were aligned with the Liberal government of Madrid. In the end, with victory by anti-Carlists, the wars resulted in successive cuts of the wide autonomy held by Biscay and the other provinces.

In the 1850s extensive prime quality iron resources were discovered in Biscay. This brought much foreign investment mainly from England and France. Development of these resources led to greater industrialization, which made Biscay one of Spain's richest provinces. Together with the industrialisation, important bourgeois families, such as Ybarra, Chávarri and Lezama-Leguizamón, developed from the new sources of wealth. The great industrial (Iberdrola, Altos Hornos de Vizcaya) and financial (Banco Bilbao Vizcaya Argentaria- BBVA) groups were created.

==== 20th century ====
During the Second Spanish Republic, the Basque Nationalist Party (PNV) governed the province. When the Spanish Civil War broke out in 1936, Biscay supported the Republican side against Francisco Franco's army and ideology. Soon after, the Republic acknowledged a statute of autonomy for the Basque Country. Due to fascist control of large parts of it, the first short-lived Basque Autonomous Community had power only over Biscay and a few nearby villages.

As the fascist army advanced westward from Navarre, defenses were planned and erected around Bilbao, called the Iron Belt. But the engineer in charge, José Goicoechea, defected to the Nationalists, causing the unfinished defenses to be of little value. In 1937, German airplanes under Franco's control destroyed the historic city of Gernika, after having bombed Durango with less severity a few weeks before. Some months later, Bilbao fell to the fascists. The Basque army (Eusko Gudarostea) retreated to Santoña, beyond the limits of Biscay. There they surrendered to the Italian forces (Santoña Agreement), but the Italians yielded to Franco. Other Republican forces considered the surrender a betrayal by the Basques.

Under the dictatorship of Franco, Biscay and Gipuzkoa (exclusively) were declared "traitor provinces" because of their opposition and stripped of any sort of self-rule. Only after Franco's death in 1975 was democracy restored in Spain. The 1978 constitution accepted the particular Basque laws (fueros) and in 1979 the Statute of Guernica was approved whereupon Biscay, Araba and Gipuzkoa formed the Autonomous Community of the Basque Country with its own parliament. During this recent democratic period, Basque Nationalist Party candidates have consistently won elections in Biscay. Recently the foral law was amended to extend it to the towns and the city of Urduina, which had previously always used the general Spanish Civil law.

== Geography ==
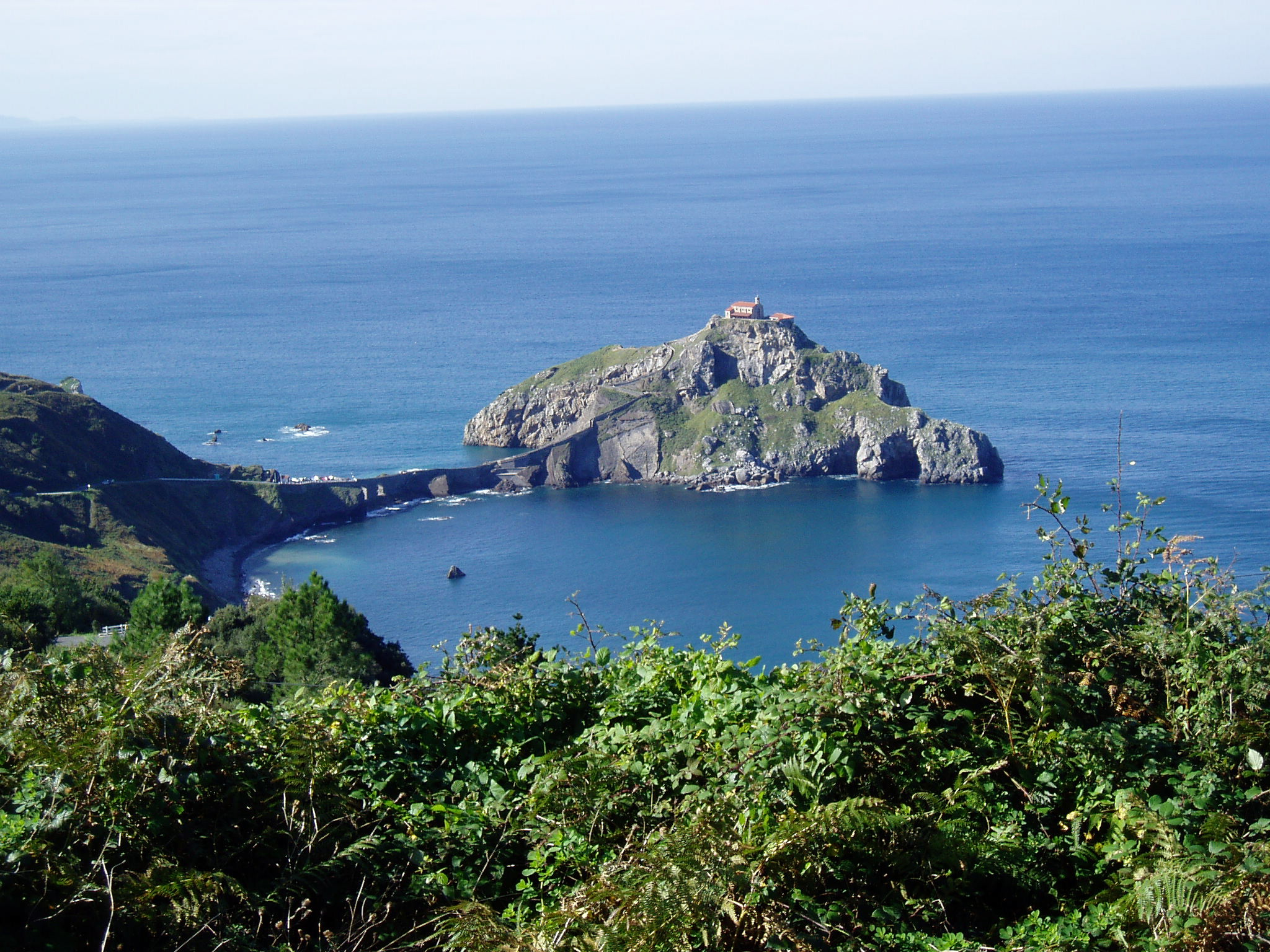
Gaztelugatxe, in Bermeo.

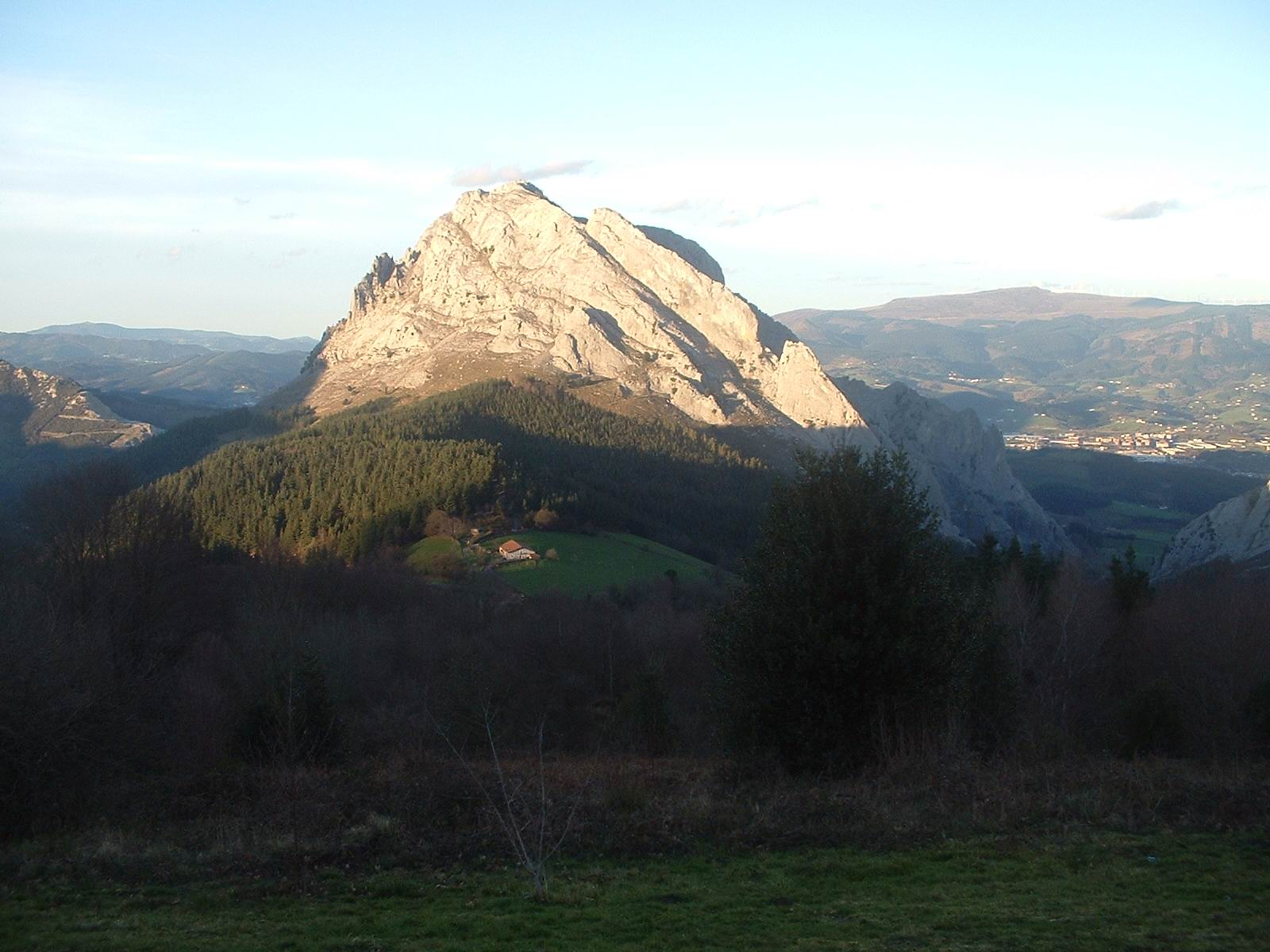
Untxillaitz, in Urkiola mountain range.

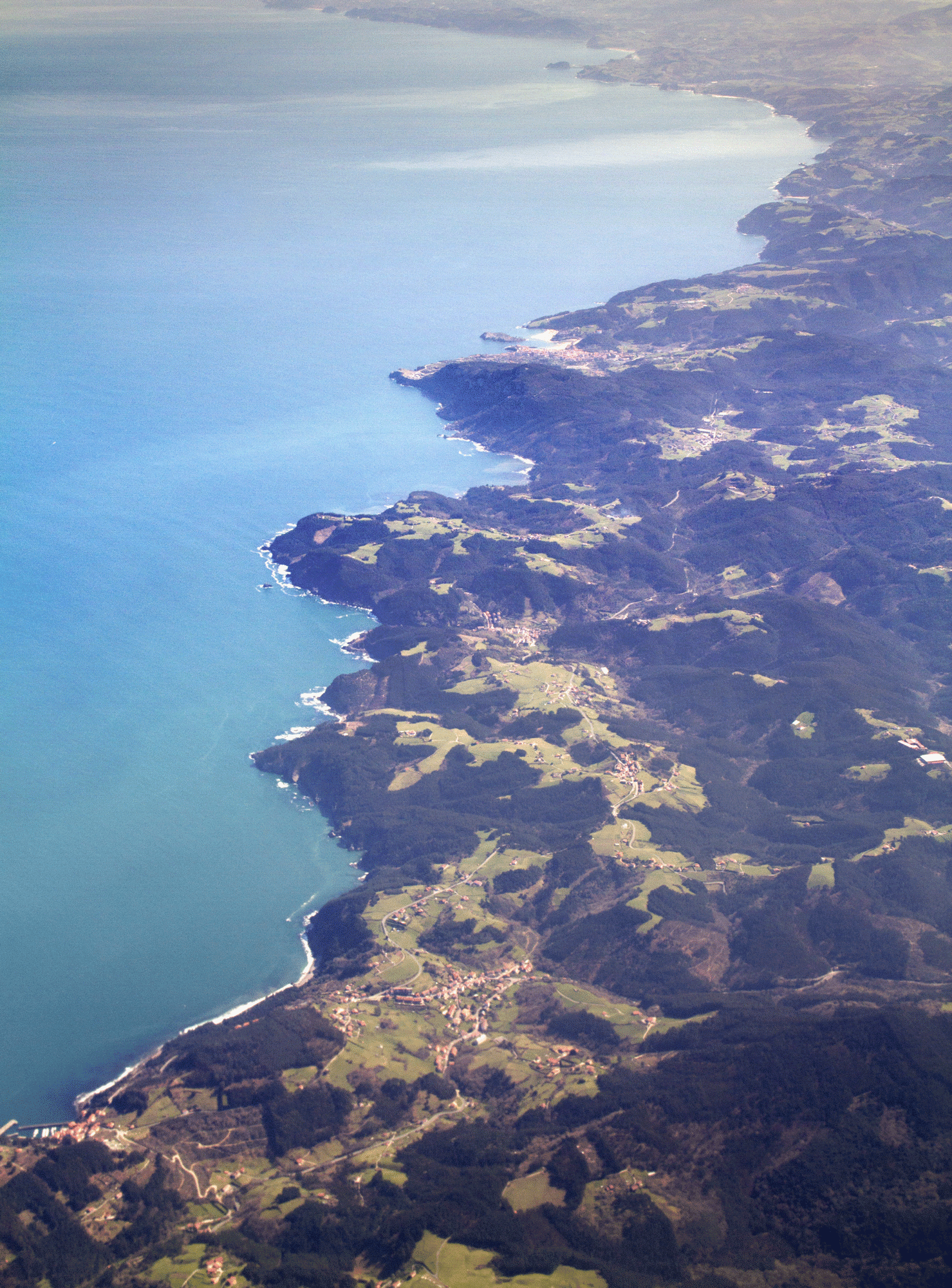
Coast of Biscay from Elantxobe eastwards.

Biscay is bordered by the community of Cantabria and the province of Burgos (in the Castile and León community) to the west, the Basque provinces of Gipuzkoa to the east, and Álava to the south, and by the Cantabrian Sea (Bay of Biscay) to the north. Orduña (Urduña) is a Biscayan exclave located between Alava and Burgos provinces.

=== Climate ===
The climate is oceanic, with high precipitation all year round and moderate temperatures, which allow the lush vegetation to grow. Temperatures are more extreme in the higher lands of inner Biscay, where snow is more common during winter. The average high temperatures in main city Bilbao is between 13 °C (55 °F) in January and 26 °C (79 °F) in August.

=== Features ===
The main geographical features of the province are:

- The southern high mountain ranges, part of the Basque Mountains, that form a continuous barrier with passes not lower than 600 m AMSL, forming the water divide of the Atlantic and Mediterranean basins. These ranges are divided from west to east in Ordunte (Zalama, 1390 m), Salbada (1100 m), Gorbea (1481 m) and Urkiola (Anboto, 1331 m).
- The middle section which is occupied by the main river's valleys: Nervion, Ibaizabal and Kadagua. Kadagua runs west to east from Ordunte, Nervion south to north from Orduña and Ibaizabal east to west from Urkiola. The Arratia River runs northwards from Gorbea and joins Ibaizabal. Each valley is separated by mountains like Ganekogorta (998 m). Other mountains, like Oiz, separate the main valleys from the northern valleys. The northern rivers are Artibai, Lea, Oka and Butron.
- The coast: the main features are the estuary of Bilbao where the main rivers meet the sea and the estuary of Gernika (Urdaibai). The coast is usually high, with cliffs and small inlets and coves.

== Demographics ==
Historical population
Year	Pop.	±%
1842	98,697	—
1857	160,579	+62.7%
1877	195,864	+22.0%
1887	234,880	+19.9%
1900	307,607	+31.0%
1910	352,058	+14.5%
1920	421,264	+19.7%
1930	482,603	+14.6%
1940	510,590	+5.8%
1950	554,302	+8.6%
1960	751,014	+35.5%
1970	1,041,461	+38.7%
1981	1,189,278	+14.2%
1991	1,155,106	−2.9%
2001	1,122,637	−2.8%
2011	1,156,190	+3.0%
2021	1,153,635	−0.2%
Source: INE

As of 2025, the population is 1,167,233, of which 48.4% are males, and 51.6% are females. Minors make up 14.6% of the population, and seniors make up 24.7%.

A 2021 survey found that 30.6% of the population spoke the Basque language.

=== Immigration ===
As of 2025, immigrants make up 13.9% of the population. The 5 largest foreign countries of birth are Colombia, Morocco, Venezuela, Bolivia, and Nicaragua.

=== Largest cities and towns ===
Largest municipalities in the province of Biscay INE - 2025
Rank		Pop.	Rank		Pop.
1	Bilbao	350,975	11	Erandio	24,721
2	Barakaldo	103,084	12	Amorebieta-Etxano	19,639
3	Getxo	75,967	13	Mungia	18,135
4	Santurtzi	46,530	14	Bermeo	17,116
5	Portugalete	44,864	15	Gernika-Lumo	17,081
6	Basauri	40,262	16	Ermua	15,560
7	Leioa	32,708	17	Sopela	15,040
8	Durango	30,181	18	Etxebarri	12,035
9	Sestao	28,473	19	Arrigorriaga	11,938
10	Galdakao	24,767	20	Valle de Trápaga-Trapagaran	11,795

== Government ==
The government and foral institutions of Biscay, as a historical territory of the Basque Country are the Juntas Generales de Vizcaya and the Foral Diputation of Biscay.

=== Juntas Generales ===
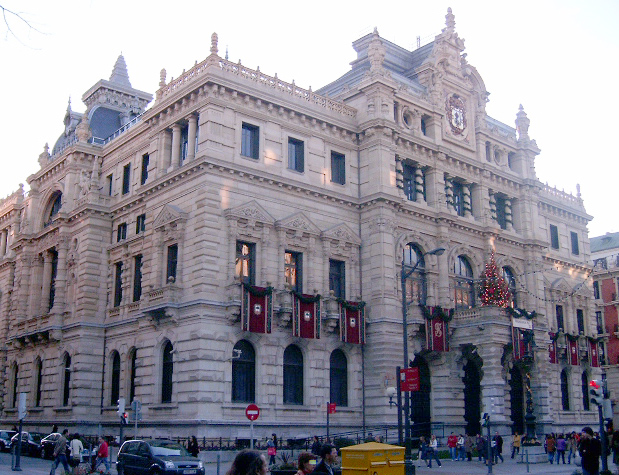
Foral Diputation's building in Bilbao.

The Juntas Generales of Biscay are a unicameral assembly that has normative authority in the province. Its members, called apoderados, are elected by universal suffrage. The elections are held every four years.

After the 2015 elections, the configuration of the Juntas is the following:

Elecciones a las Juntas Generales 2015
Party	Apoderados
Basque Nationalist Party	23
Bildu	11
Socialist Party of the Basque Country–Basque Country Left	7
Podemos	6
People's Party	4

=== Foral Diputation ===
The Foral Diputation has an executive function and regulatory authority in Biscay. The Foral Diputation is configured by a General Deputy, who currently is Unai Rementeria (PNV) and who is chosen by the Juntas Generales and by the rest of deputies.

=== Administrative divisions ===
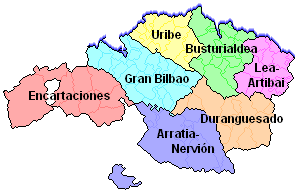
Map of Biscay's regions or "comarcas".

Map of current municipalities of Biscay.

==== Historical ====
Historically, Biscay was divided into merindades (called eskualdeak in Basque), which were two, the Constituent ones and the ones incorporated later.

The constituent ones were (the number indicates their position on the map):

- Uribe^{1}
- Busturia^{2}
- Markina^{3}
- Bedia^{4}
- Amorebieta (also Zornotza)^{5}
- Arratia^{6}

Incorporated later:

- Durango
- Enkarterri
- Orozko
- Orduña
- Some other independent cities and towns.

==== Modern ====
Currently, Biscay is divided into 7 comarcas or regions, each one with its own capital city, subdivisions and municipalities, which number 113 in total.

The comarcas are:

- Greater Bilbao, usually divided into subregions:
  - Bilbao
  - Left Bank
  - Uribe-Kosta
  - Txorierri
  - Hego Uribe
- Mungialdea
- Enkarterri
- Busturialdea
- Durangaldea
- Lea-Artibai
- Arratia-Nerbioi

The municipalities are:

- Abadiño
- Abanto y Ciérvana-Abanto Zierbena
- Ajangiz
- Alonsotegi
- Amorebieta-Etxano
- Amoroto
- Arakaldo
- Arantzazu
- Areatza
- Arrankudiaga
- Arratzu
- Arrieta
- Arrigorriaga
- Artea
- Artzentales
- Atxondo
- Aulesti
- Bakio
- Balmaseda
- Barakaldo
- Barrika
- Basauri
- Bedia
- Berango
- Bermeo
- Berriatua
- Berriz
- Bilbao
- Busturia
- Derio
- Dima
- Durango
- Ea
- Elantxobe
- Elorrio
- Erandio
- Ereño
- Ermua
- Errigoiti
- Etxebarri
- Etxebarria
- Forua
- Fruiz
- Galdakao
- Galdames
- Gamiz-Fika
- Garai
- Gatika
- Gautegiz Arteaga
- Gernika-Lumo
- Getxo
- Gizaburuaga
- Gordexola
- Gorliz
- Güeñes
- Ibarrangelu
- Igorre
- Ispaster
- Iurreta
- Izurtza
- Karrantza Harana/Valle de Carranza
- Kortezubi
- Lanestosa
- Larrabetzu
- Laukiz
- Leioa
- Lekeitio
- Lemoa
- Lemoiz
- Lezama
- Loiu
- Mallabia
- Mañaria
- Markina-Xemein
- Maruri-Jatabe
- Mendata
- Mendexa
- Meñaka
- Morga
- Mundaka
- Mungia
- Munitibar-Arbatzegi Gerrikaitz
- Murueta
- Muskiz
- Muxika
- Nabarniz
- Ondarroa
- Orozko
- Ortuella
- Otxandio
- Plentzia
- Portugalete
- Santurtzi
- Sestao
- Sondika
- Sopelana
- Sopuerta
- Sukarrieta
- Trucios-Turtzioz
- Ubide
- Ugao-Miraballes
- Urduliz
- Urduña/Orduña
- Usansolo
- Valle de Trápaga-Trapagaran
- Zaldibar
- Zalla
- Zamudio
- Zaratamo
- Zeanuri
- Zeberio
- Zierbena
- Ziortza-Bolibar

== Tourism ==
Biscay's capital city, Bilbao, is famous for the Guggenheim Museum Bilbao and for its estuary.

Monuments and places of general interest

- Casa de Juntas (House of the Juntas) and the Tree of Gernika, both in Gernika.
- Casa de Juntas (House of the Juntas) of Avellanada, in the Enkarterri region.
- Pozalagua Cave in Karrantza near Balmaseda
- Vizcaya Bridge, linking the towns of Portugalete and Getxo
- Santimamiñe and the Oma forest
- Euskalduna Conference Centre and Concert Hall in Bilbao.
- Gaztelugatxe
- Urdaibai biosphere reserve
- Urkiola Natural Park

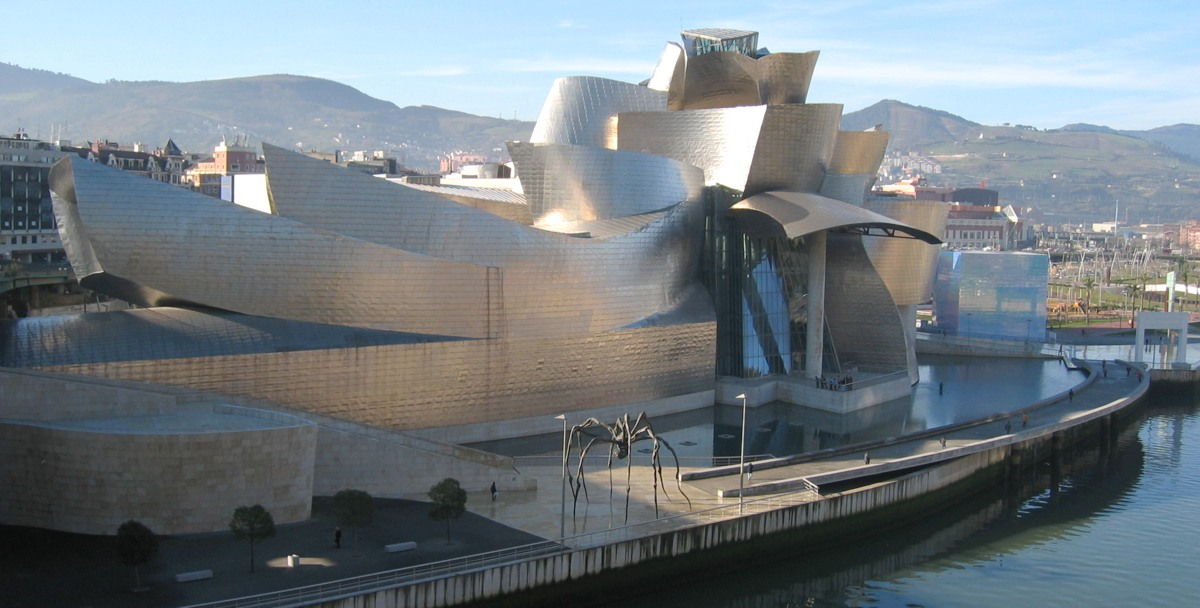
Guggenheim Museum and the Estuary of Bilbao

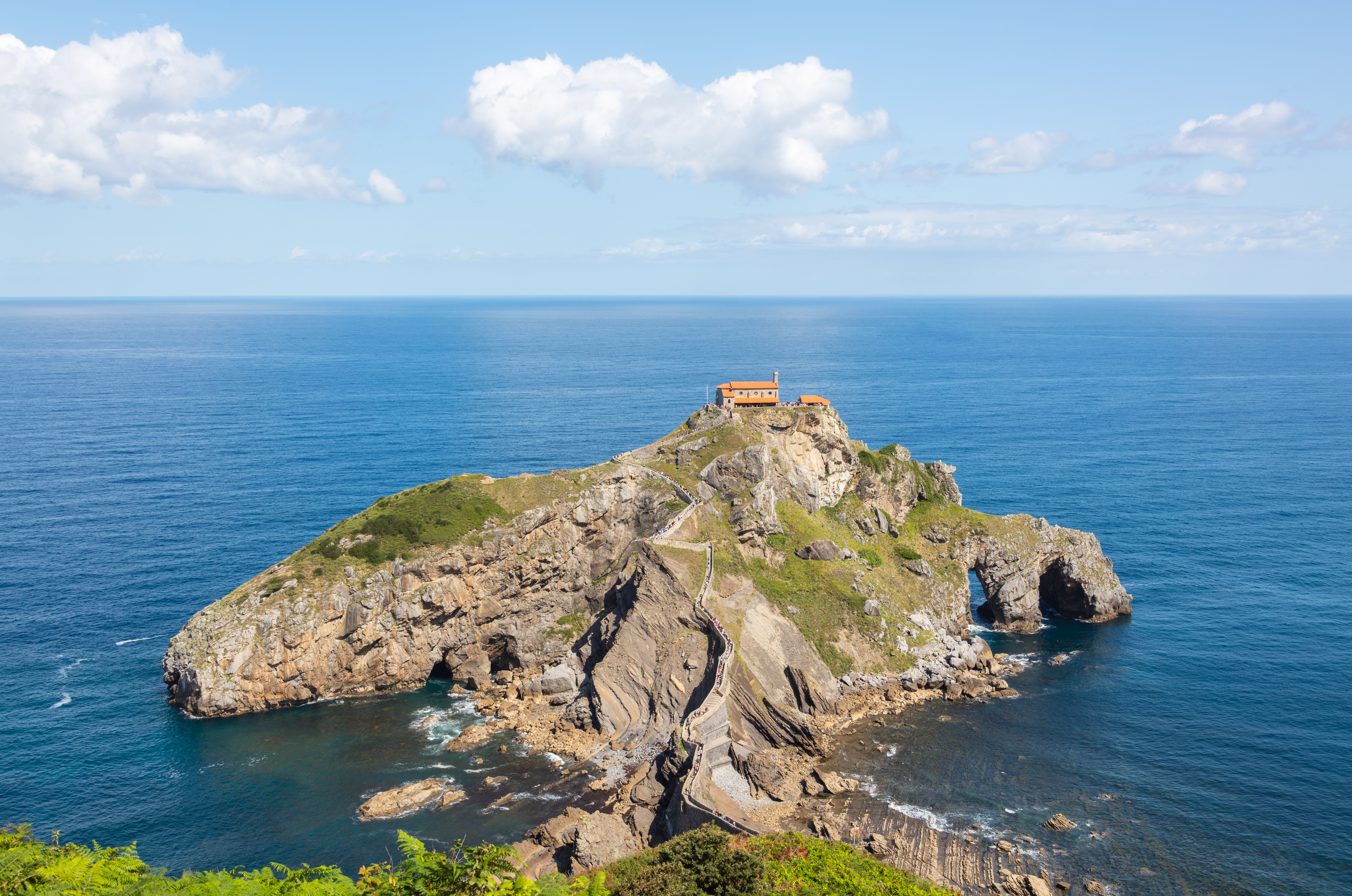
Gaztelugatxe islet

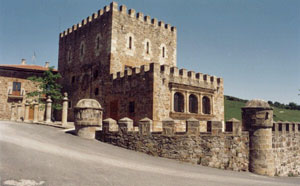
Casa de Juntas of Avellanada

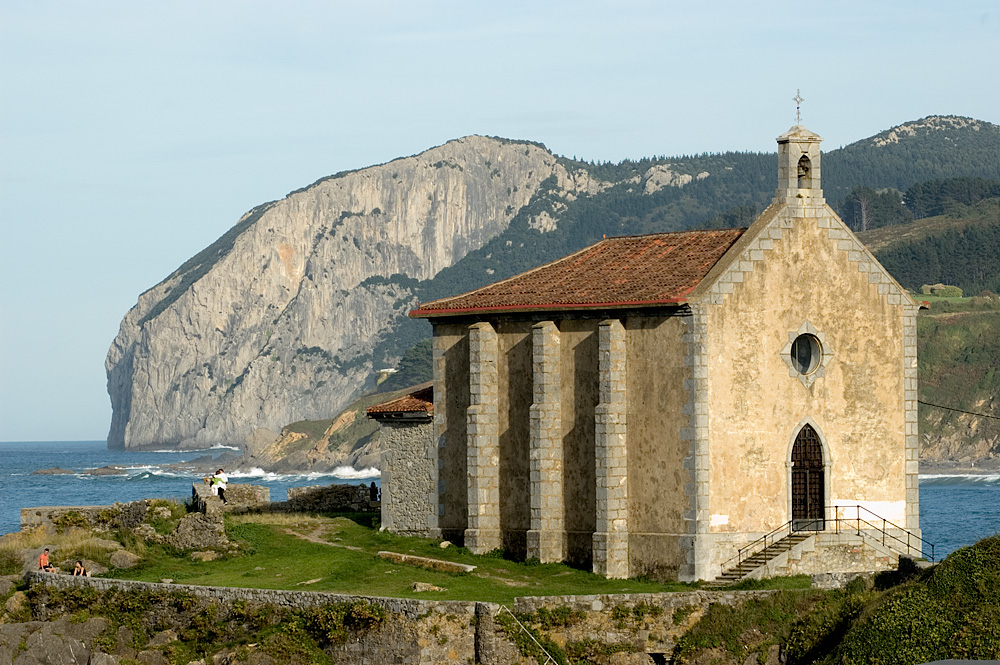
Urdaibai

== Transport ==
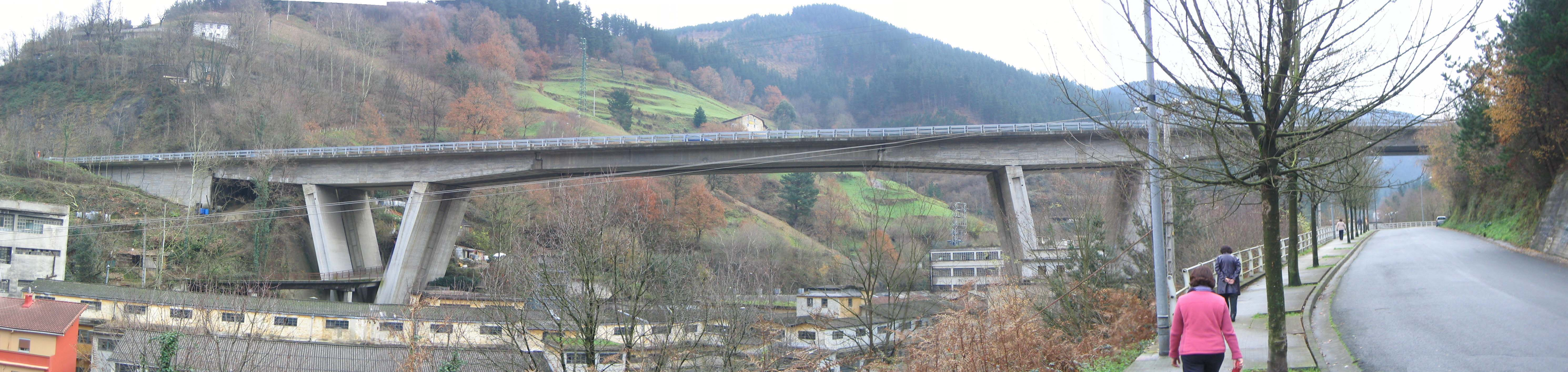
The Cantabric Highway.

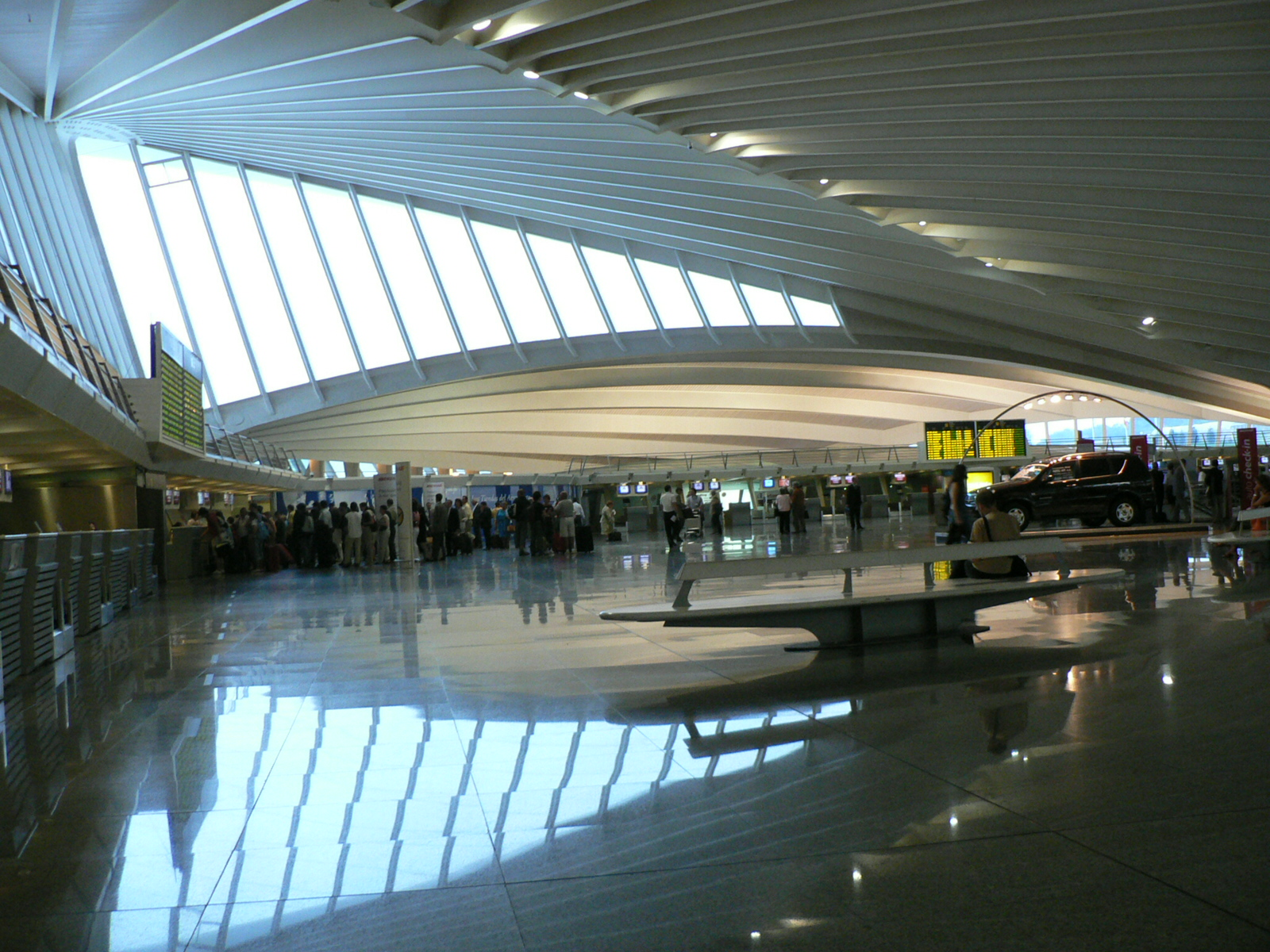
Bilbao's airport, in Loiu.

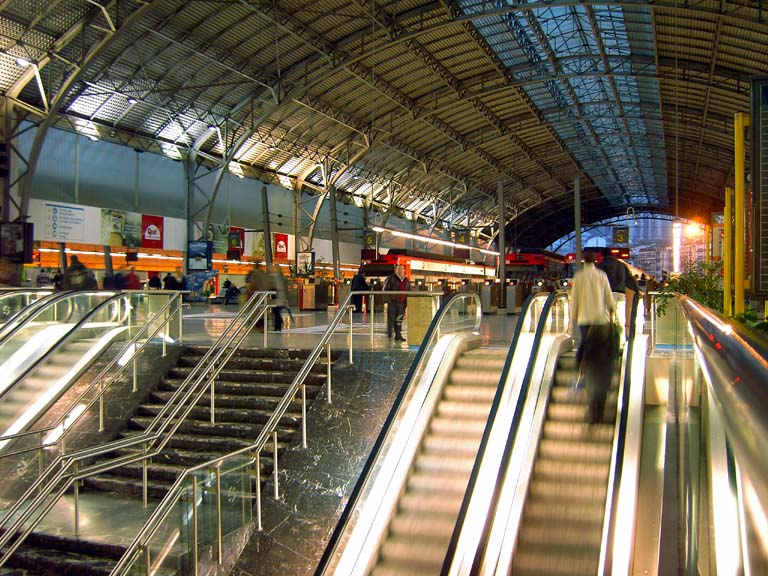
Bilbao's main train station.

=== Roads ===
Biscay is connected to the rest of provinces by two main highways, the Cantabric Highway, which connects Bilbao and Durango with the French border, with accesses in Eibar, Zarautz and San Sebastián (the three of them in the province of Gipuzkoa), and the Basque-Aragonese Highway, which connects Bilbao with Zaragoza via Tudela, Calahorra and Logroño.

Many secondary roads also connect Bilbao with the different towns located in the province.

=== Air ===
Biscay's main and only airport is Bilbao Airport, which is the most important hub in northern Spain, and the number of passengers using the new terminal continues to rise. It is located in the municipalities of Loiu and Sondika.

=== Commuter rail ===
Biscay has different commuter rail services, operated by different companies. Cercanías Bilbao is the national commuter rail service "cercanías" offered by Renfe, the national rail company. It connects Bilbao and its neighborhoods with other municipalities and regions inside Biscay, like Barakaldo, Santurtzi, Muskiz, Orduña, Balmaseda, and others.

In addition, EuskoTren has three commuter rail lines in the province, all of which start in Bilbao. One connects the city and Greater Bilbao with the comarca of Durangaldea and finishes in San Sebastián (in the province of Gipuzkoa), while the other two connect the Greater Bilbao with Busturialdea and Txorierri regions.

=== Long distance railways ===
Bilbao-Abando is Biscay's main train station, with regular trains to other Spanish provinces like Burgos, Madrid and Barcelona offered by Renfe. FEVE also offers long distance trains to Cantabria and the Province of León in the Castile and León community.

The Basque Y is the name given to the future high-speed rail that will connect the three cities of the Basque Country: Bilbao (in Biscay); San Sebastián (in Gipuzkoa); and Vitoria-Gasteiz in Álava.

=== Metro ===
The Bilbao Metro is a metro system serving the city of Bilbao and its metropolitan area, the Greater Bilbao region. It connects the city with other municipalities like Basauri, Barakaldo, Santurtzi and Getxo, among others.

== See also ==
- Nueva Vizcaya
- Ondategi
