= Igorre =

Place in Basque Country, Spain

Igorre Yurre
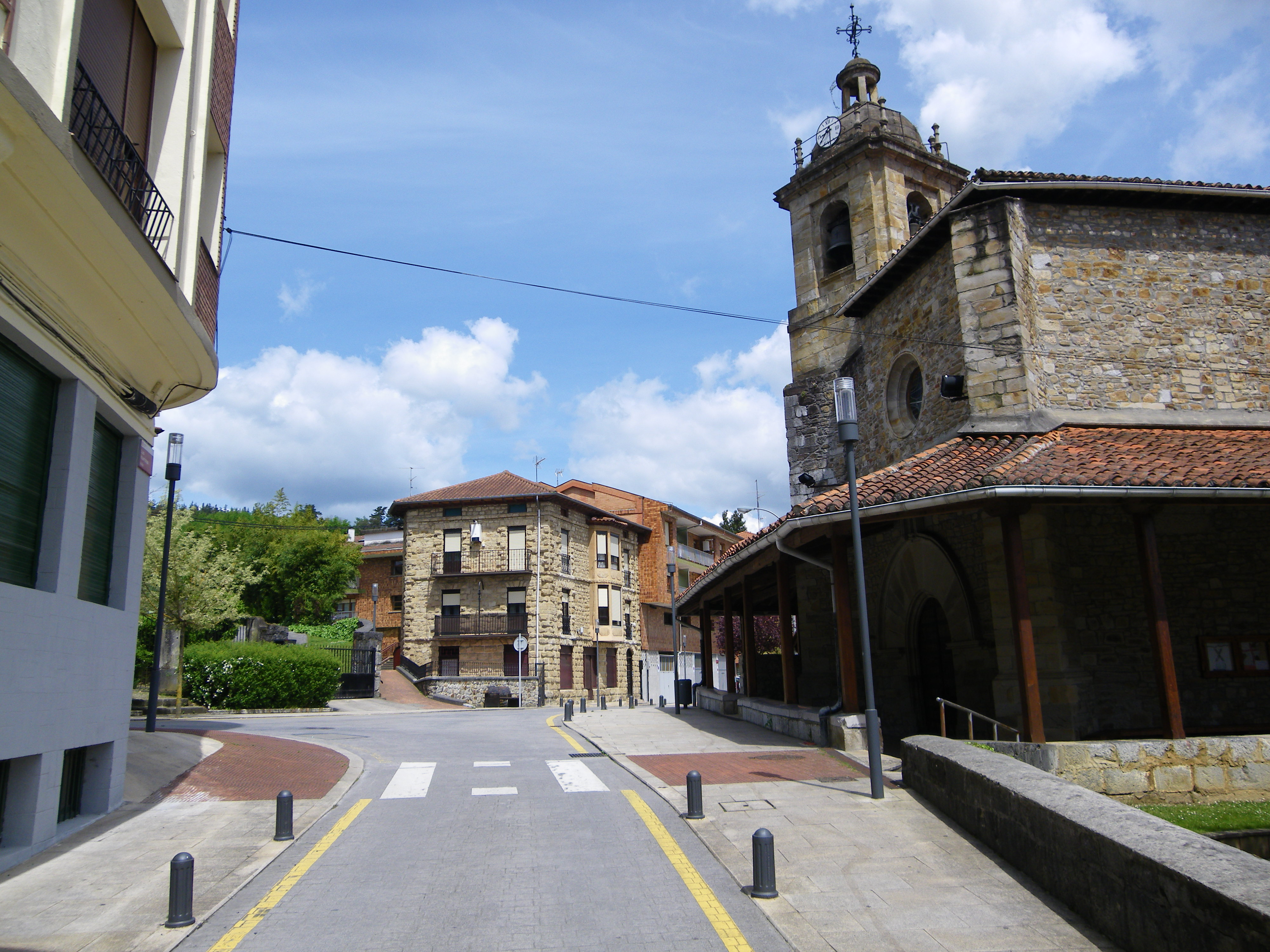

- Coat of arms

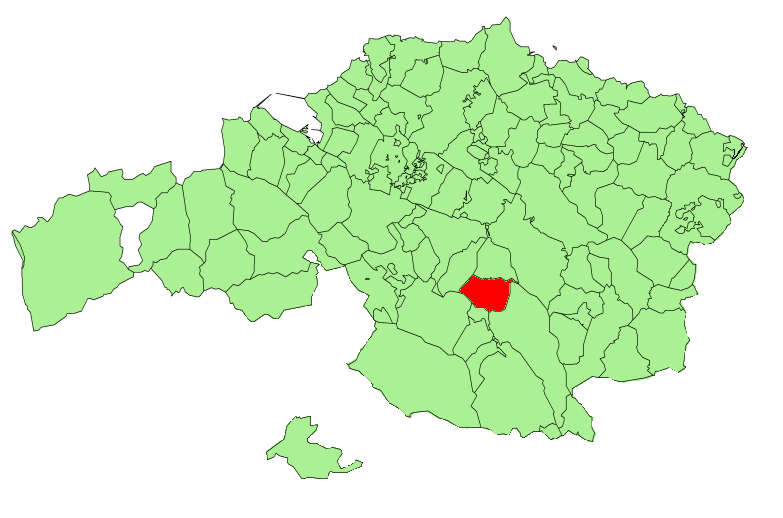
- Location in Biscay

- Location of Igorre within the Basque Country Location of Igorre within Spain
- Coordinates: 43°9′49.84″N 2°46′45.54″W
- Country: Spain
- Autonomous community: Basque Country
- Province: Biscay
- Comarca: Arratia-Nerbioi

Area
  - Total: 17 km^{2} (6.6 sq mi)
- Elevation: 90 m (300 ft)

Population (2025-01-01)
  - Total: 4,344
  - Density: 260/km^{2} (660/sq mi)
- Postal code: 48140
- Website: www.igorre.net

Igorre is a municipality located in the province of Biscay, in the autonomous community of Basque Country, northern Spain.
