= Zeanuri =

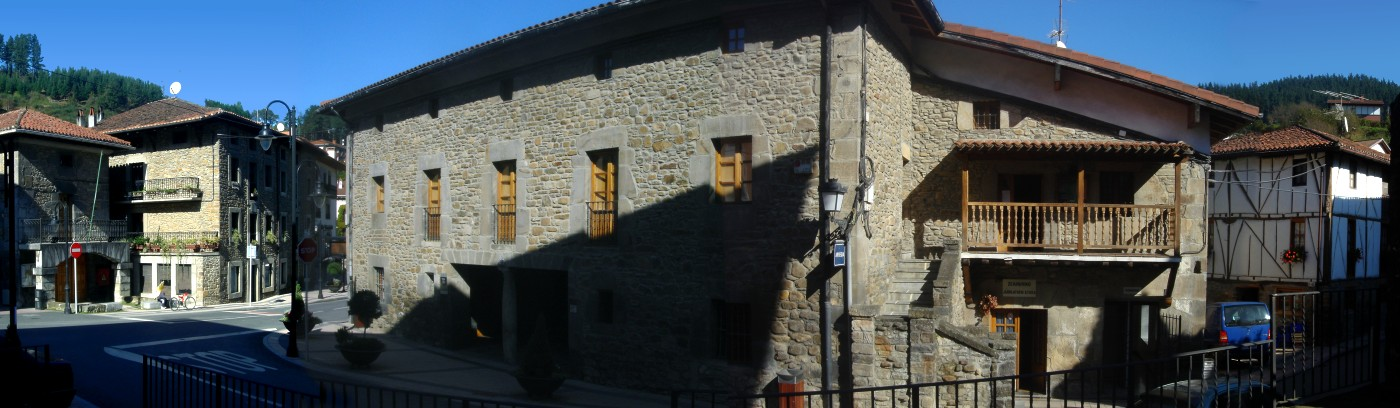

- Coat of arms

- Location of Zeanuri within the Basque Country Location of Zeanuri within Spain
- Coordinates: 43°5′55″N 2°44′57″W
- Country: Spain
- Autonomous community: Basque Country
- Province: Biscay
- Comarca: Arratia-Nerbioi

Government
  - Mayor: Izaskun Sagarna Mendia

Area
  - Total: 67 km^{2} (26 sq mi)
- Elevation: 203 m (666 ft)

Population (2025-01-01)
  - Total: 1,234
  - Density: 18/km^{2} (48/sq mi)
- Time zone: UTC+1 (CET)
  - Summer (DST): UTC+2 (CEST)
- Postal code: 48144
- Website: www.zeanuri-udala.org

Zeanuri (Spanish: Ceánuri) is a town and municipality located in the province of Biscay, in the Autonomous Community of the Basque Country, northern Spain.

== Etymology ==
The word uri clearly appears in the town's name, which in the western dialect of Basque means town, city. This word usually appears combined with proper names or common names to form place names in the provinces of Vizcaya, Álava and La Rioja.

In the case of Zeanuri, its direct meaning is the town of Cean. The first part of the toponym is unknown since it does not correspond to any Basque word or to any currently recognizable proper name.

In Basque, the name of the town is spelled as Zeanuri according to the modern spelling rules of the language. In 1993 the city council changed the official name of the municipality from its traditional form in Castilian to the form in Basque.
