= Lemoa =

- Municipality
- Flag Coat of arms

- Location of Lemoa within the Basque Country Lemoa (Spain)
- Coordinates: 43°12′30″N 2°46′30″W
- Country: Spain
- Autonomous community: Basque Country
- Province: Biscay
- Comarca: Arratia-Nerbioi

Government
  - Mayor: Saioa Elejabarrieta (Bildu)

Area
  - Total: 15.85 km^{2} (6.12 sq mi)
- Elevation: 80 m (260 ft)

Population (2025-01-01)
  - Total: 3,614
  - Density: 228.0/km^{2} (590.5/sq mi)
- Time zone: UTC+1 (CET)
  - Summer (DST): UTC+2 (CEST)
- Postal code: 48330
- Official language(s): Basque; Spanish
- Website: Official website

Lemoa (Spanish: Lemona) is a town and municipality located in the province of Biscay, in the autonomous community of Basque Country, northern Spain.

== Sports ==
- SD Lemona (Football) in Segunda División B

== Notable people ==
- Gurutzi Arregi (1936–2020), ethnographer
