= Arantzazu =

- Municipality
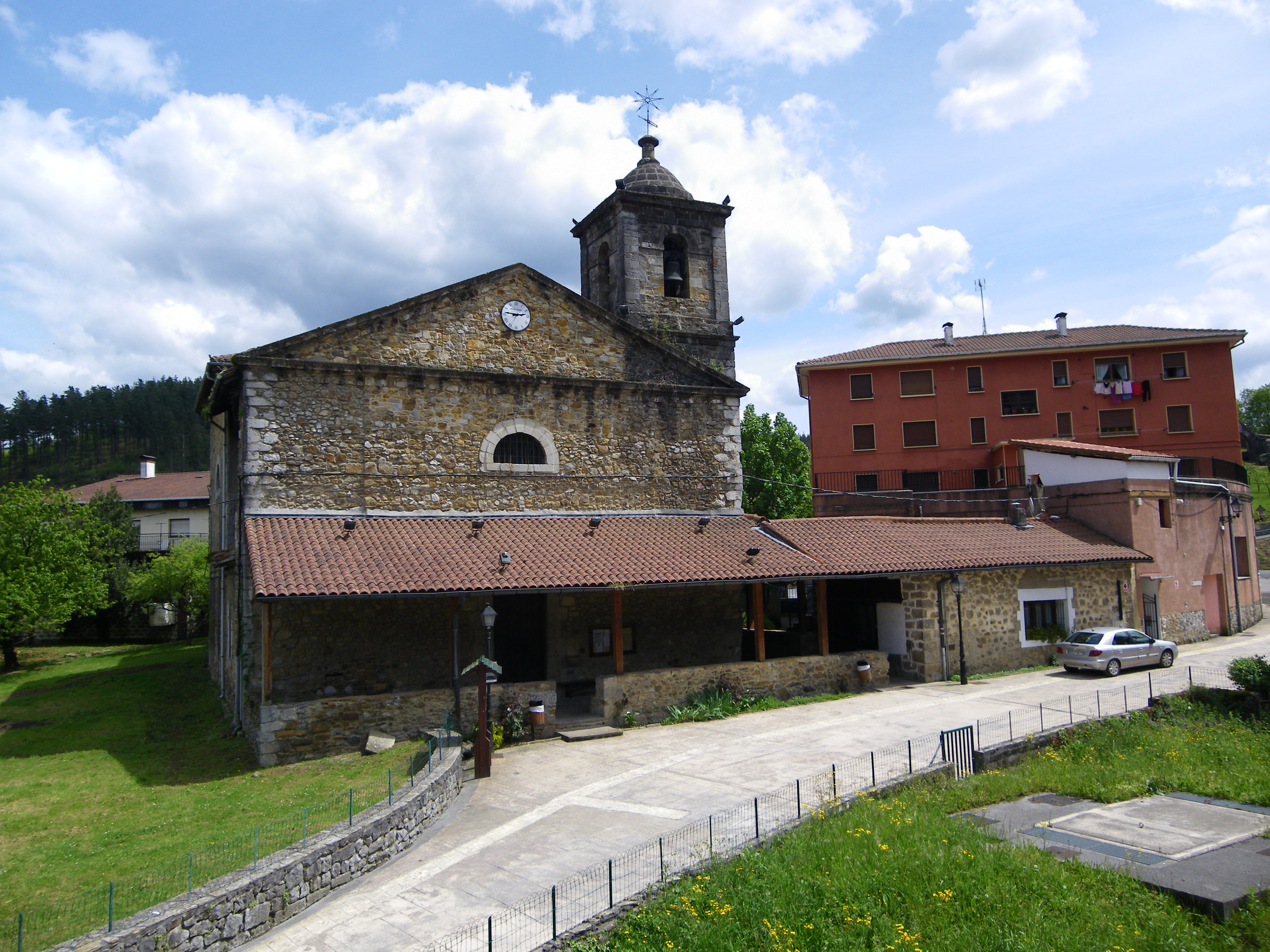

- Coat of arms

- Location of Arantzazu within the Basque Country
- Coordinates: 43°09′27″N 2°47′21″W
- Country: Spain
- Autonomous community: (Basque Country (autonomous community)) Basque Country
- Province: Biscay
- Comarca: Arratia-Nerbioi

Government
  - Mayor: Igor Menika Bengoetxea (EH Bildu)

Area
  - Total: 3.80 km^{2} (1.47 sq mi)
- Elevation: 144 m (472 ft)

Population (2025-01-01)
  - Total: 411
  - Density: 108/km^{2} (280/sq mi)
- Demonym: Basque: arantzazuarra
- Time zone: UTC+1 (CET)
  - Summer (DST): UTC+2 (CEST)
- Postal code: 48140
- Website: Official website

Arantzazu (Spanish Aránzazu) is a town and municipality located in the province of Bizkaia, in the Autonomous Community of Basque Country, northern Spain.

== Toponym ==
- Etymologically Arantzazu means 'place of hawthorn' in the Basque language. In addition, this municipality of Biscay has the same name as another district in Oñati (Gipuzkoa), famous for being the location of the Sanctuary of Arantzazu.

== Architecture ==
- San Pedro de Arantzazu is the church of the municipality, finished in 1828.

== Population ==
- 305 inhabitants. (INE 2007).

== Geography ==
- Elevation: 135 metres.

== See also ==
- Arantxa
