= Artea =

Artea Castillo y Elejabeitia
- Municipality
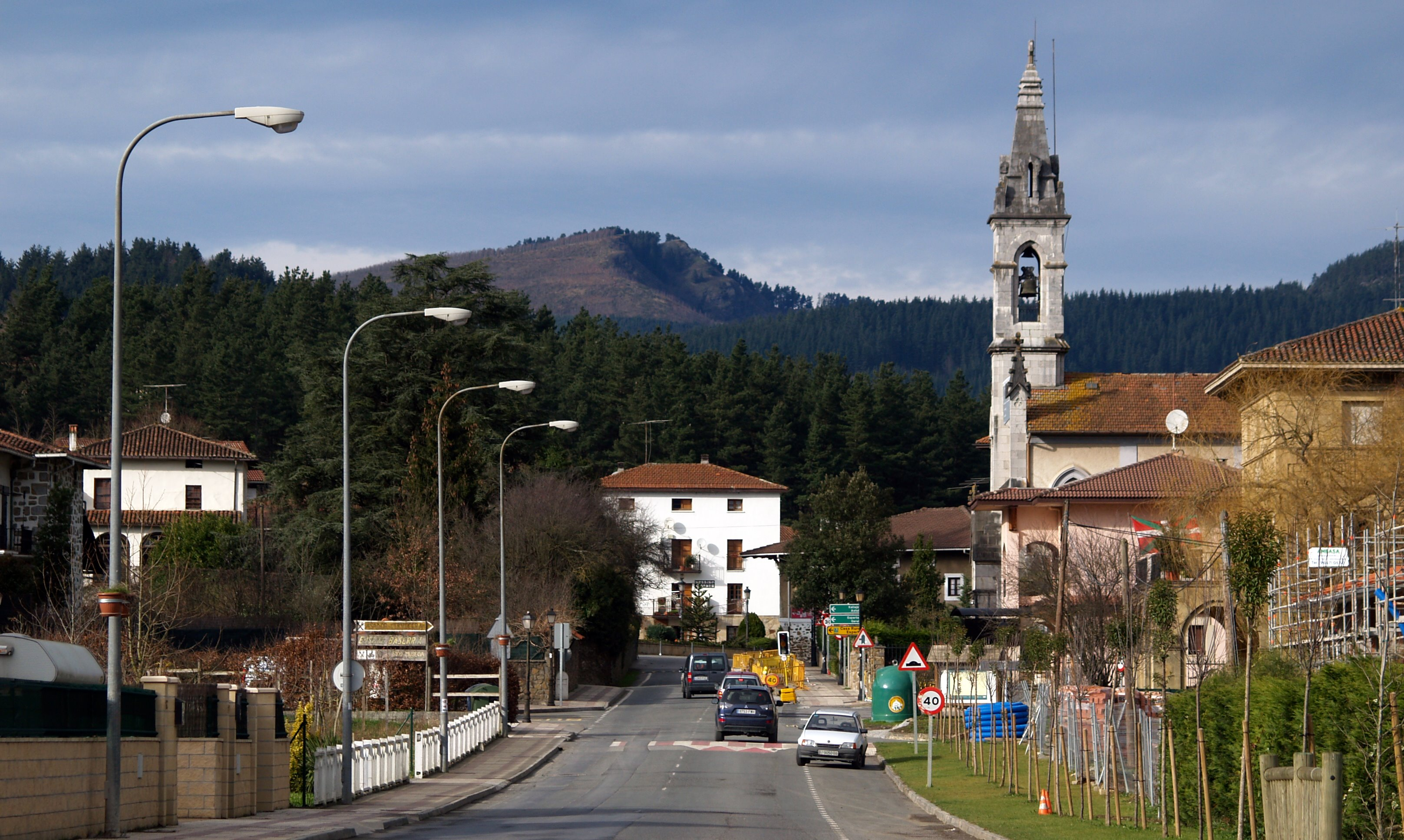

- Flag Coat of arms

- Location of Artea within the Basque Country Location of Artea within Spain
- Coordinates: 43°08′00″N 2°47′04″W
- Country: Spain
- Autonomous community: Basque Country
- Province: Biscay
- Comarca: Greater Bilbao

Area
  - Total: 12.40 km^{2} (4.79 sq mi)
- Elevation: 125 m (410 ft)

Population (2025-01-01)
  - Total: 743
  - Density: 59.9/km^{2} (155/sq mi)
- Demonym: Basque: arteagatarra
- Time zone: UTC+1 (CET)
  - Summer (DST): UTC+2 (CEST)
- Postal code: 48142
- Official language(s): Basque; Spanish
- Website: Official website

Artea is a town and municipality located in the province of Biscay, in the autonomous community of Basque Country, northern Spain.
