= Ubide =

Coordinates: 43°1′27″N 2°41′19″W

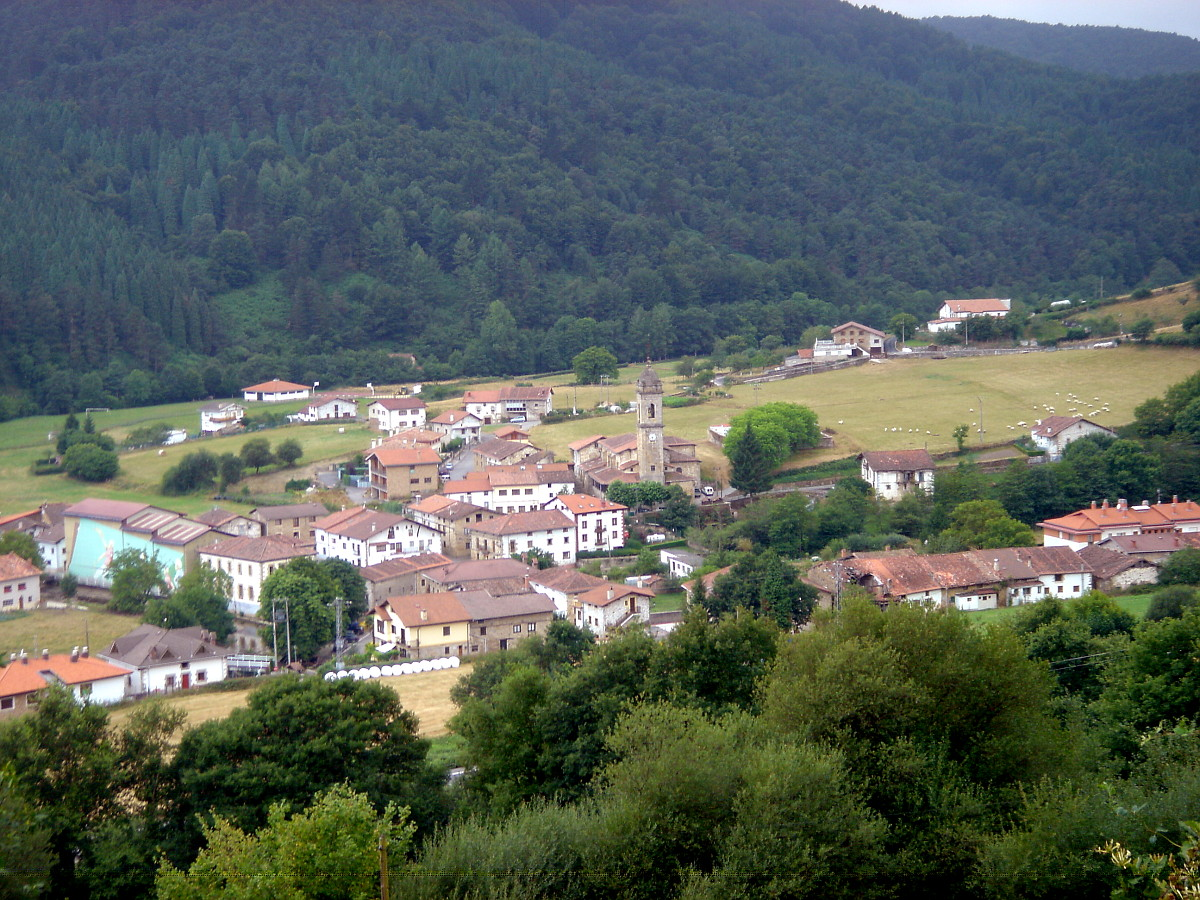
- View of Ubide

- Coat of arms

- Location in Spain.
- Country: Spain
- Autonomous community: Basque Autonomous Community

Government
  - Mayor: Joxan Pagola Kortajarena

Area
  - Total: 2.90 km^{2} (1.12 sq mi)
- Elevation: 568 m (1,864 ft)

Population (2025-01-01)
  - Total: 167
  - Density: 57.6/km^{2} (149/sq mi)
- Time zone: UTC+1 (CET)
  - Summer (DST): UTC+2 (CEST)
- Website: www.ubide.eus

Ubide (Spanish: Ubidea) is a town and municipality located in the province of Biscay, in the Autonomous community of Basque Country, northern Spain.
