= List of municipalities in Biscay =

Map of Spain with Biscay highlighted

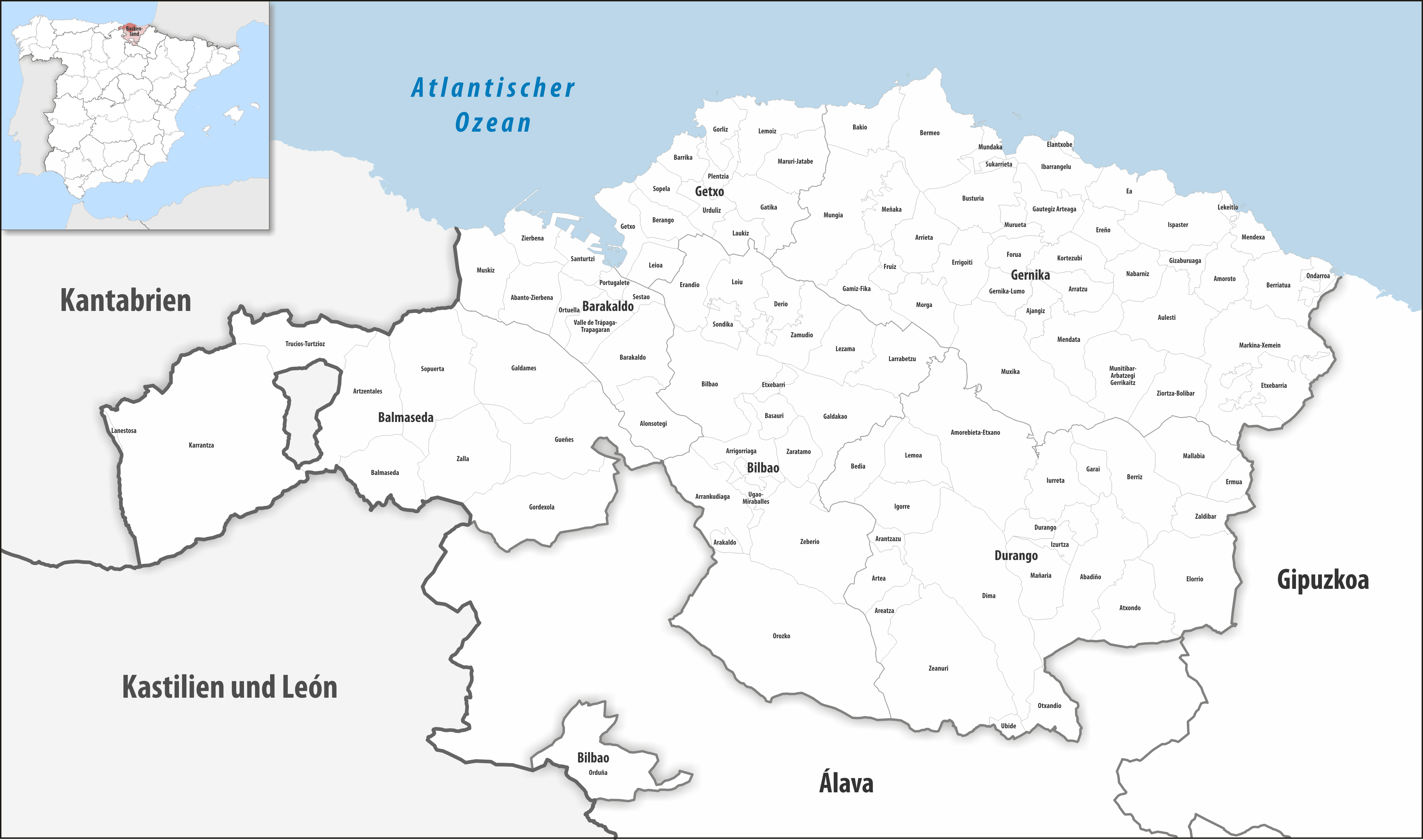
Map of the municipalities in the province of Biscay

Biscay is a province in the autonomous community of the Basque Country, Spain, that is divided into 113 municipalities. As of the 2023 Spanish census, the province is the tenth largest by population, with 1,153,282 inhabitants, and the second smallest by land area, spanning 2,215.55 square kilometres (855.43 sq mi). Municipalities are the basic local political division in Spain and can only belong to one province. They enjoy a large degree of autonomy in their local administration. Amongst other tasks, they are in charge of urban planning, water supply, lighting, road network, local police, and firefighting.

The organisation of municipalities in Spain is outlined in a local government law (Spanish: Ley 7/1985, de 2 de abril, Reguladora de las Bases del Régimen Local; transl. Law 7/1985, of 2 April, Regulating the Bases of the Local Administration) passed on 2 April 1985 and finalised by an 18 April 1986 royal decree. The Statute of Autonomy of the Basque Country of 1979 also contains provisions concerning the relations between the municipalities and the autonomous government of the Basque Country. All citizens of Spain are required to register in the municipality in which they reside. Each municipality is a corporation with independent legal personhood: its governing body is called the ayuntamiento (municipal council or corporation), a term often also used to refer to the municipal offices (city and town halls). The ayuntamiento is composed of the mayor (Spanish: alcalde), the deputy mayors (tenientes de alcalde) and the plenary assembly (pleno) of councillors (concejales). Municipalities are categorised by population for the purpose of determining the number of councillors: three when the population is up to 100 inhabitants, five for 101–250, seven for 251–1,000, nine for 1,001–2,000, eleven for 2,001–5,000, thirteen for 5,001–10,000, seventeen for 10,001–20,000, twenty-one for 20,001–50,000, and twenty-five for 50,001–100,000. One councillor is added for every additional 100,000 inhabitants, with a further one added when the number of councillors based on this methodology would be even in order to prevent tied votes.

The mayor and the deputy mayors are elected by the plenary assembly, which is itself elected by universal suffrage. Elections in municipalities with more than 250 inhabitants are carried out following a proportional representation system with closed lists, whilst those with a population lower than 250 use a block plurality voting system with open lists. The plenary assembly must meet periodically at the seat of the ayuntamiento, with meetings occurring more or less frequently depending on the population of the municipality: monthly for those whose population is larger than 20,000, once every two months if it ranges between 5,001 and 20,000, and once every three months if it does not exceed 5,000. Many ayuntamientos also have a local governing board (Spanish: junta de gobierno local), which is named by the mayor from amongst the councillors and is required for municipalities of more than 5,000 inhabitants. The board, whose role is to assist the mayor between meetings of the plenary assembly, may not include more than one third of the councillors.

The largest municipality by population in the province of Biscay as of the 2023 Spanish census is Bilbao, its capital, with 345,235 residents, while the smallest is Arakaldo, with 162 residents. The largest municipality by area is Karrantza Harana/Valle de Carranza, which spans 137.82 km², while Lanestosa is the smallest at 1.14 km².

== Municipalities ==
Most populous municipalities in Biscay

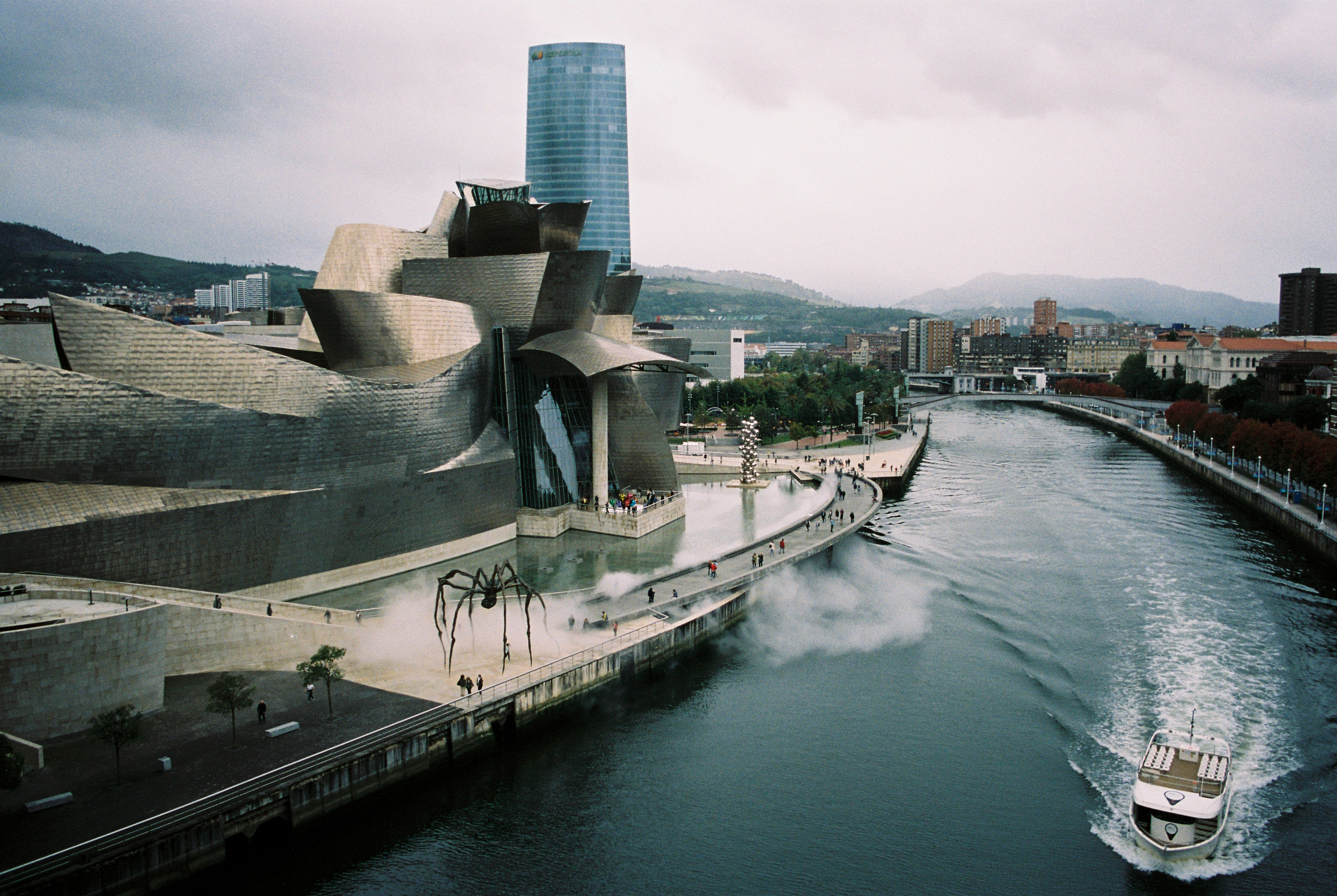
Bilbao is the province's capital and largest municipality by population.

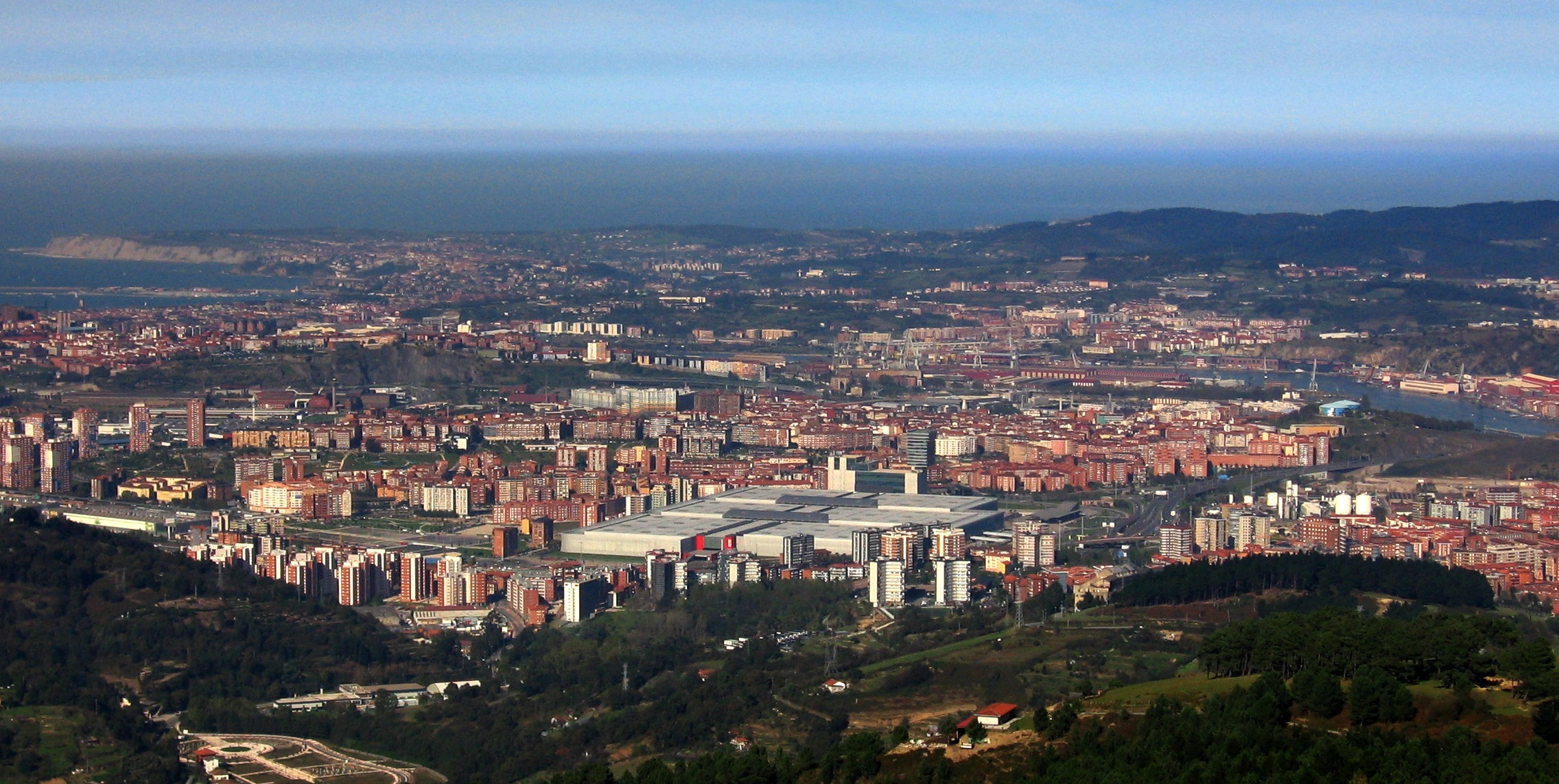
Barakaldo, the second most populous municipality in Biscay

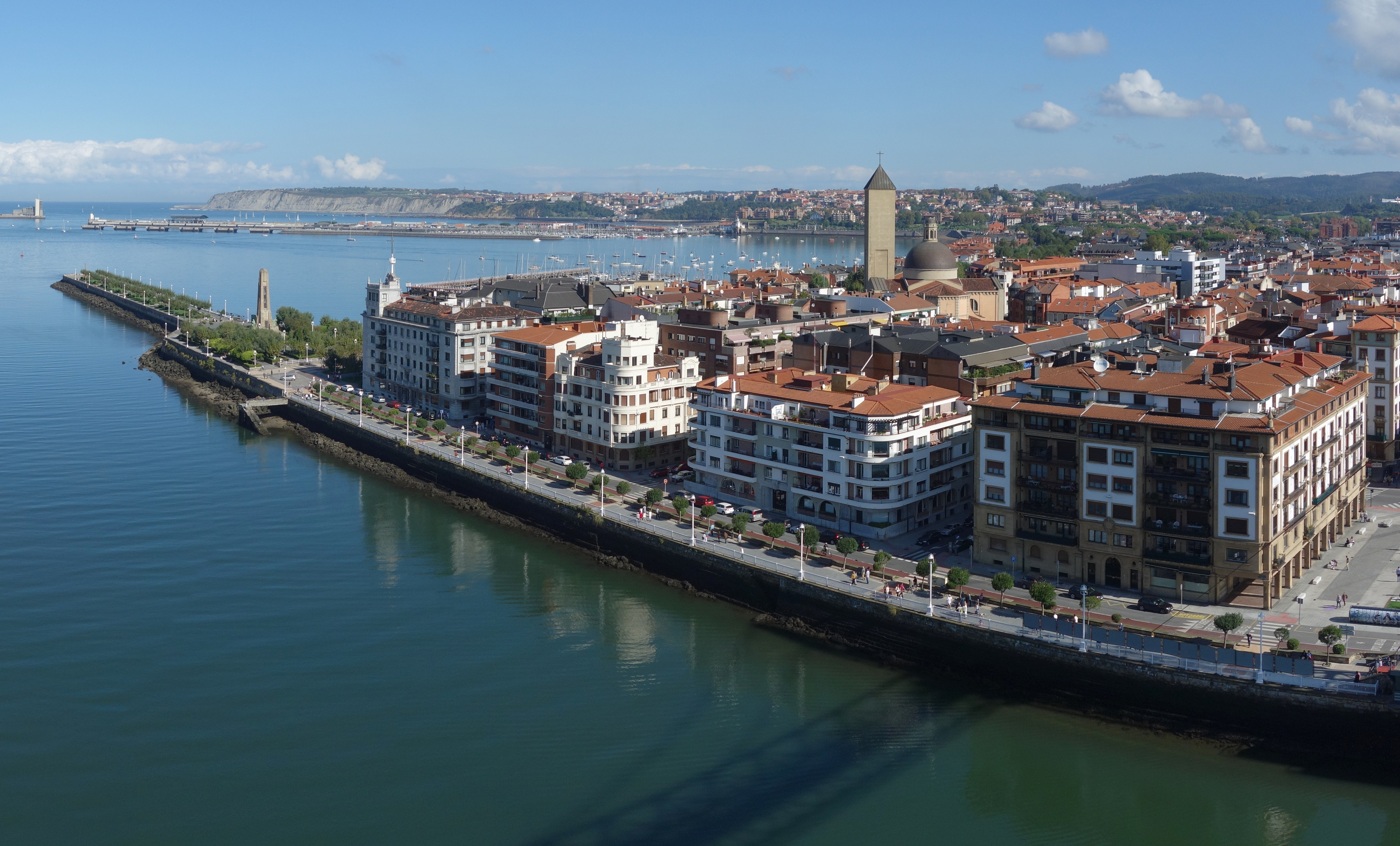
Getxo is Biscay's third largest municipality by population.

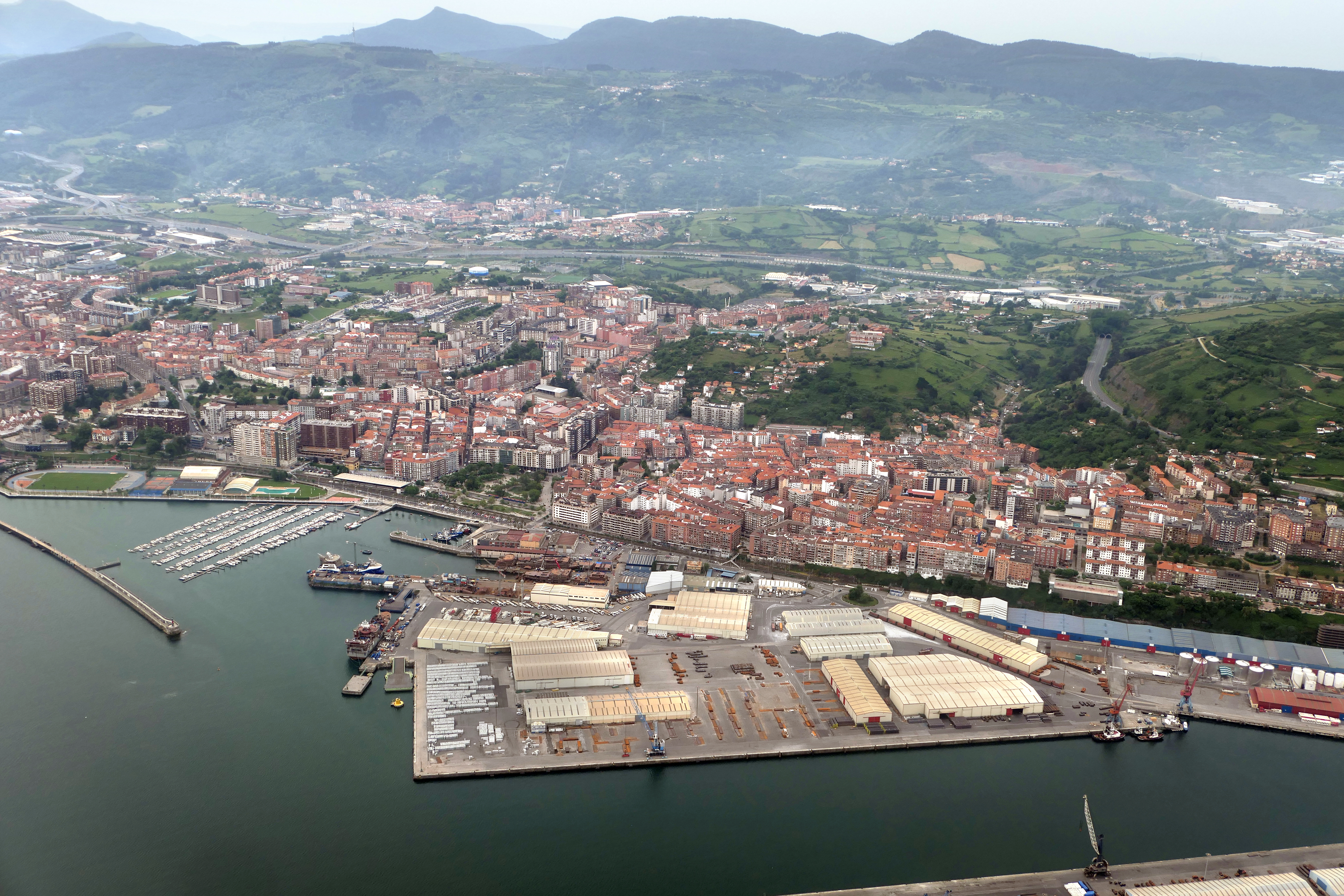
Santurtzi, Biscay's fourth largest municipality by population

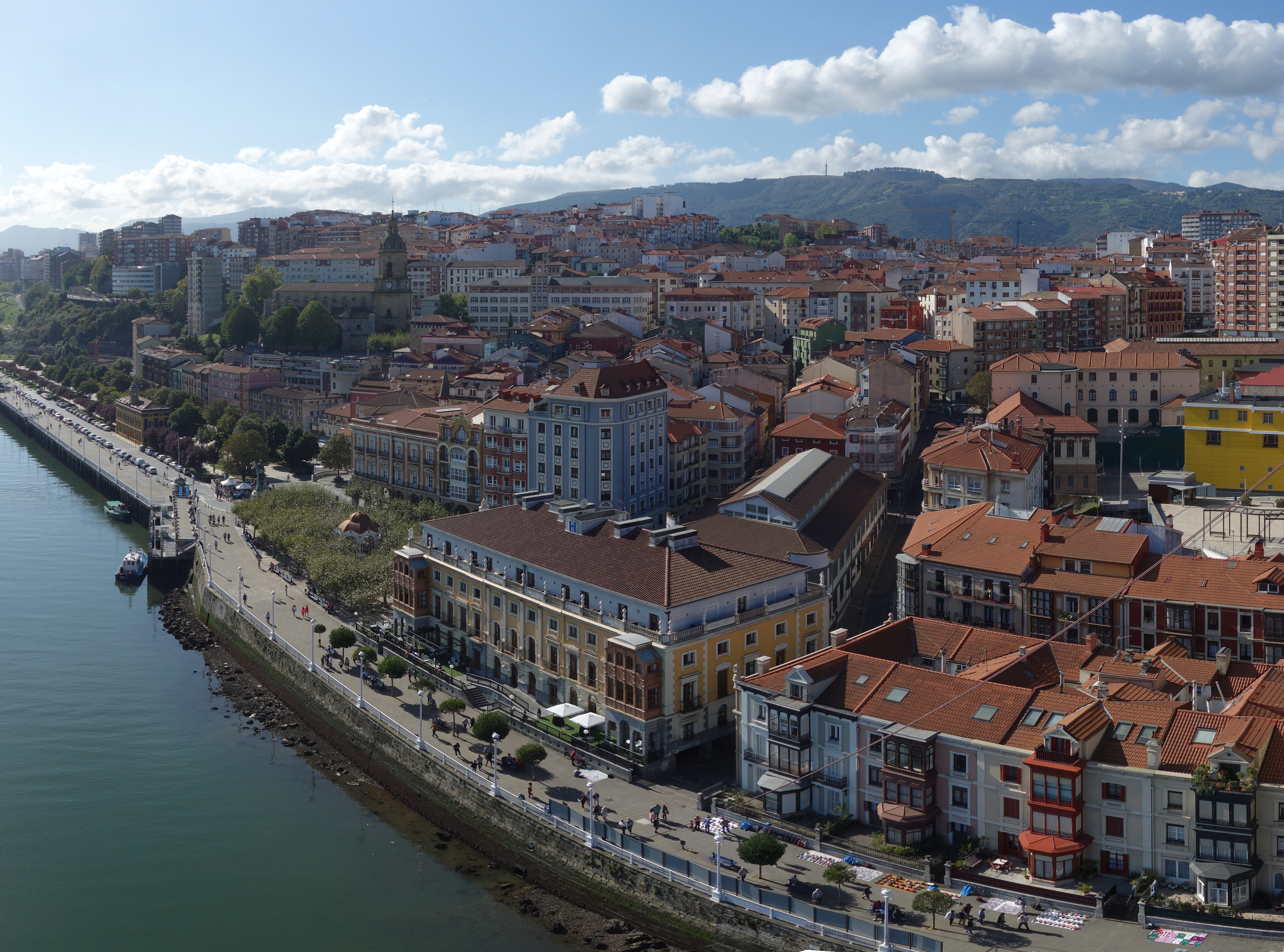
Portugalete is the fifth most populous municipality in Biscay.

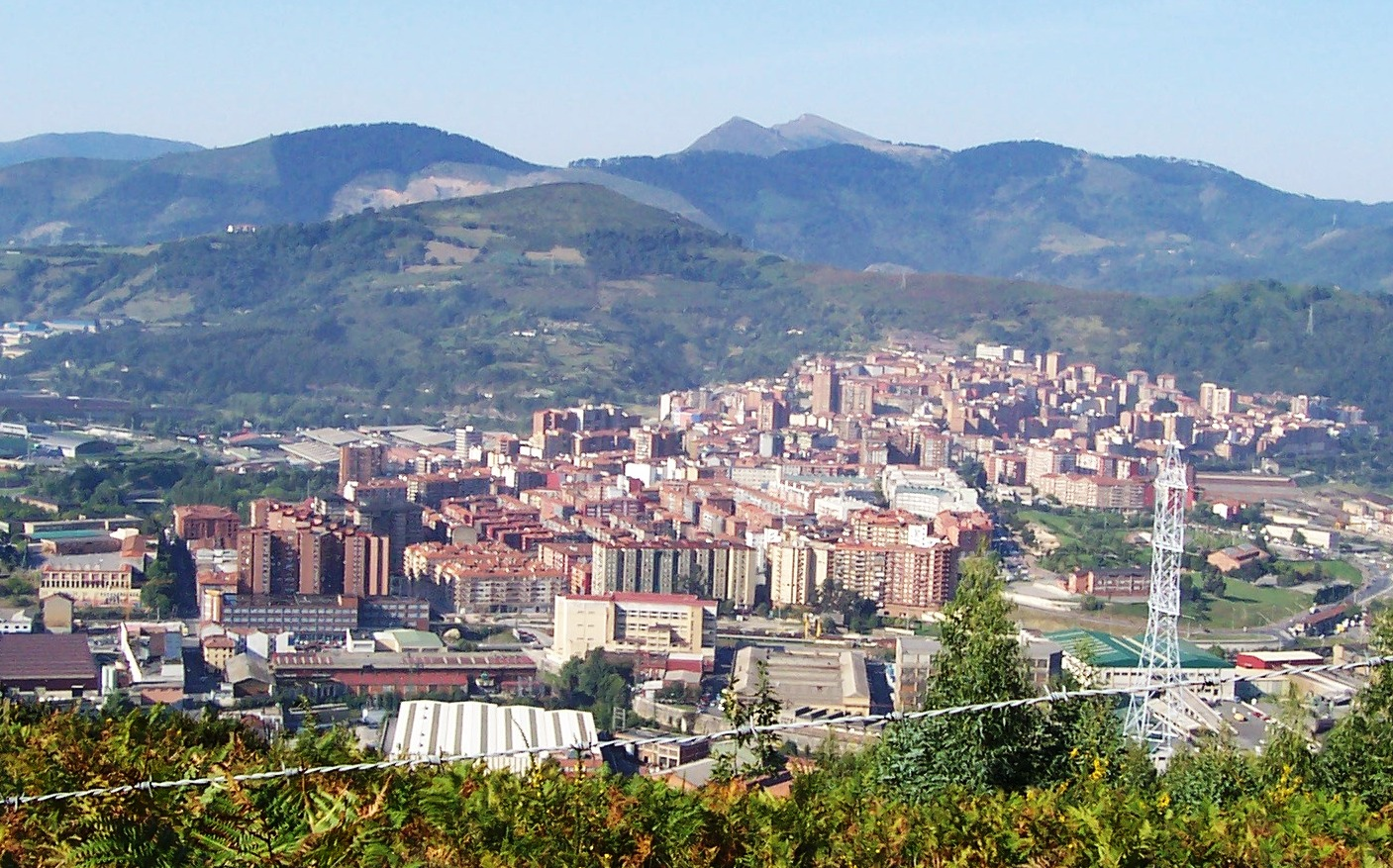
Basauri is the province's sixth largest municipality by population.

† Provincial capital

Municipalities in Biscay
Name	Population (2023 census)	Population (2011 census)	Population change	Land area (km²)	Population density (2023)
Abadiño	7,720	7,350	+5.0%	36.05	214.1/km^{2}
Abanto y Ciérvana-Abanto Zierbena	9,401	9,742	−3.5%	16.20	580.3/km^{2}
Ajangiz	478	456	+4.8%	7.13	67.0/km^{2}
Alonsotegi	2,959	2,838	+4.3%	20.22	146.3/km^{2}
Amorebieta-Etxano	19,540	18,400	+6.2%	58.84	332.1/km^{2}
Amoroto	392	413	−5.1%	13.07	30.0/km^{2}
Arakaldo	162	129	+25.6%	2.72	59.6/km^{2}
Arantzazu	391	361	+8.3%	3.54	110.5/km^{2}
Areatza	1,238	1,224	+1.1%	9.12	135.7/km^{2}
Arrankudiaga	992	954	+4.0%	22.70	43.7/km^{2}
Arratzu	429	385	+11.4%	10.06	42.6/km^{2}
Arrieta	580	549	+5.6%	14.62	39.7/km^{2}
Arrigorriaga	11,949	12,525	−4.6%	16.25	735.3/km^{2}
Artea	755	772	−2.2%	12.35	61.1/km^{2}
Artzentales	726	753	−3.6%	36.79	19.7/km^{2}
Atxondo	1,368	1,428	−4.2%	23.37	58.5/km^{2}
Aulesti	654	672	−2.7%	25.56	25.6/km^{2}
Bakio	2,813	2,588	+8.7%	16.59	169.6/km^{2}
Balmaseda	7,642	7,681	−0.5%	22.37	341.6/km^{2}
Barakaldo	100,987	100,064	+0.9%	24.99	4,041.1/km^{2}
Barrika	1,542	1,523	+1.2%	7.74	199.2/km^{2}
Basauri	40,430	41,777	−3.2%	7.01	5,767.5/km^{2}
Bedia	1,113	976	+14.0%	16.37	68.0/km^{2}
Berango	7,472	6,883	+8.6%	8.73	855.9/km^{2}
Bermeo	16,911	17,092	−1.1%	33.81	500.2/km^{2}
Berriatua	1,215	1,242	−2.2%	19.20	63.3/km^{2}
Berriz	4,533	4,875	−7.0%	29.77	152.3/km^{2}
Bilbao†	345,235	351,356	−1.7%	41.34	8,351.1/km^{2}
Busturia	1,643	1,748	−6.0%	20.22	81.3/km^{2}
Derio	7,064	5,578	+26.6%	10.15	696.0/km^{2}
Dima	1,497	1,364	+9.8%	62.41	24.0/km^{2}
Durango	29,715	28,367	+4.8%	10.73	2,769.3/km^{2}
Ea	826	883	−6.5%	14.24	58.0/km^{2}
Elantxobe	349	409	−14.7%	1.80	193.9/km^{2}
Elorrio	7,299	7,294	+0.1%	37.01	197.2/km^{2}
Erandio	24,426	24,369	+0.2%	18.17	1,344.3/km^{2}
Ereño	276	262	+5.3%	10.52	26.2/km^{2}
Ermua	15,594	16,235	−3.9%	6.47	2,410.2/km^{2}
Errigoiti	510	543	−6.1%	16.52	30.9/km^{2}
Etxebarri	11,968	10,230	+17.0%	3.27	3,659.9/km^{2}
Etxebarria	783	806	−2.9%	17.84	43.9/km^{2}
Forua	915	979	−6.5%	7.63	119.9/km^{2}
Fruiz	550	513	+7.2%	5.62	97.9/km^{2}
Galdakao	29,309	29,153	+0.5%	31.47	931.3/km^{2}
Galdames	833	843	−1.2%	44.41	18.8/km^{2}
Gamiz-Fika	1,394	1,342	+3.9%	15.30	91.1/km^{2}
Garai	334	345	−3.2%	7.15	46.7/km^{2}
Gatika	1,624	1,623	+0.1%	17.29	93.9/km^{2}
Gautegiz Arteaga	888	903	−1.7%	13.54	65.6/km^{2}
Gernika-Lumo	17,012	16,727	+1.7%	8.53	1,994.4/km^{2}
Getxo	76,297	80,252	−4.9%	11.87	6,427.7/km^{2}
Gizaburuaga	196	204	−3.9%	6.09	32.2/km^{2}
Gordexola	1,681	1,728	−2.7%	41.30	40.7/km^{2}
Gorliz	6,067	5,501	+10.3%	10.23	593.1/km^{2}
Güeñes	6,736	6,403	+5.2%	41.48	162.4/km^{2}
Ibarrangelu	694	636	+9.1%	15.49	44.8/km^{2}
Igorre	4,284	4,240	+1.0%	17.09	250.7/km^{2}
Ispaster	734	695	+5.6%	22.98	31.9/km^{2}
Iurreta	3,733	3,852	−3.1%	18.86	197.9/km^{2}
Izurtza	225	275	−18.2%	4.37	51.5/km^{2}
Karrantza Harana/Valle de Carranza	11,907	2,795	+326.0%	137.82	86.4/km^{2}
Kortezubi	445	429	+3.7%	11.86	37.5/km^{2}
Lanestosa	248	265	−6.4%	1.14	217.5/km^{2}
Larrabetzu	2,056	1,979	+3.9%	21.54	95.5/km^{2}
Laukiz	1,225	1,132	+8.2%	8.11	151.0/km^{2}
Leioa	32,472	30,483	+6.5%	8.39	3,870.3/km^{2}
Lekeitio	7,141	7,377	−3.2%	1.79	3,989.4/km^{2}
Lemoa	3,540	3,408	+3.9%	15.42	229.6/km^{2}
Lemoiz	1,315	1,061	+23.9%	18.91	69.5/km^{2}
Lezama	2,448	2,467	−0.8%	16.29	150.3/km^{2}
Loiu	2,296	2,494	−7.9%	15.02	152.9/km^{2}
Mallabia	1,159	1,192	−2.8%	23.11	50.2/km^{2}
Mañaria	533	498	+7.0%	17.59	30.3/km^{2}
Markina-Xemein	5,021	4,941	+1.6%	45.32	110.8/km^{2}
Maruri-Jatabe	1,069	961	+11.2%	15.96	67.0/km^{2}
Mendata	385	381	+1.0%	22.43	17.2/km^{2}
Mendexa	424	437	−3.0%	6.93	61.2/km^{2}
Meñaka	763	746	+2.3%	12.49	61.1/km^{2}
Morga	415	401	+3.5%	14.47	28.7/km^{2}
Mundaka	1,842	1,943	−5.2%	4.08	451.5/km^{2}
Mungia	17,865	16,857	+6.0%	44.46	401.8/km^{2}
Munitibar-Arbatzegi Gerrikaitz	471	434	+8.5%	24.31	19.4/km^{2}
Murueta	338	303	+11.6%	5.63	60.0/km^{2}
Muskiz	7,342	7,518	−2.3%	21.01	349.5/km^{2}
Muxika	1,516	1,467	+3.3%	49.87	30.4/km^{2}
Nabarniz	269	227	+18.5%	11.76	22.9/km^{2}
Ondarroa	8,207	8,799	−6.7%	4.30	1,908.6/km^{2}
Orozko	2,658	2,512	+5.8%	102.27	26.0/km^{2}
Ortuella	8,537	8,440	+1.1%	7.96	1,072.5/km^{2}
Otxandio	1,324	1,300	+1.8%	12.39	106.9/km^{2}
Plentzia	4,369	4,329	+0.9%	5.91	739.3/km^{2}
Portugalete	44,648	47,698	−6.4%	3.14	14,219.1/km^{2}
Santurtzi	46,089	47,101	−2.1%	8.87	5,196.1/km^{2}
Sestao	27,780	28,805	−3.6%	3.58	7,759.8/km^{2}
Sondika	4,525	4,543	−0.4%	6.85	660.6/km^{2}
Sopelana	14,857	12,824	+15.9%	8.43	1,762.4/km^{2}
Sopuerta	2,721	2,570	+5.9%	42.56	63.9/km^{2}
Sukarrieta	354	350	+1.1%	1.91	185.3/km^{2}
Trucios-Turtzioz	520	532	−2.3%	25.99	20.0/km^{2}
Ubide	179	185	−3.2%	2.81	63.7/km^{2}
Ugao-Miraballes	4,158	4,052	+2.6%	5.26	790.5/km^{2}
Urduliz	5,468	3,601	+51.8%	7.81	700.1/km^{2}
Urduña/Orduña	4,163	4,241	−1.8%	33.40	124.6/km^{2}
Usansolo	No data (Note: Usansolo was partitioned from Galdakao and became an independent municipality in 2023 and is thus not included in the 2023 or 2011 censuses.)				
Valle de Trápaga-Trapagaran	11,907	12,166	−2.1%	12.86	925.9/km^{2}
Zaldibar	3,000	3,053	−1.7%	11.65	257.5/km^{2}
Zalla	8,322	8,411	−1.1%	31.08	267.8/km^{2}
Zamudio	3,290	3,277	+0.4%	18.17	181.1/km^{2}
Zaratamo	1,605	1,651	−2.8%	10.18	157.7/km^{2}
Zeanuri	1,248	1,299	−3.9%	67.22	18.6/km^{2}
Zeberio	1,083	1,080	+0.3%	47.68	22.7/km^{2}
Zierbena	1,496	1,458	+2.6%	12.15	123.1/km^{2}
Ziortza-Bolibar	399	411	−2.9%	18.86	21.2/km^{2}
Biscay	1,153,282	1,156,190	−0.3%	2,215.55	520.5/km^{2}
Basque Country	2,216,302	2,185,393	+1.4%	7,092.45	312.5/km^{2}
Spain	48,085,361	46,815,916	+2.7%	504,755.17	95.3/km^{2}

== See also ==
- Geography of Spain
- List of municipalities of Spain
- Media related to the municipalities in Biscay at Wikimedia Commons
