= Oca River, Biscay =

River in Biscay

Oca River
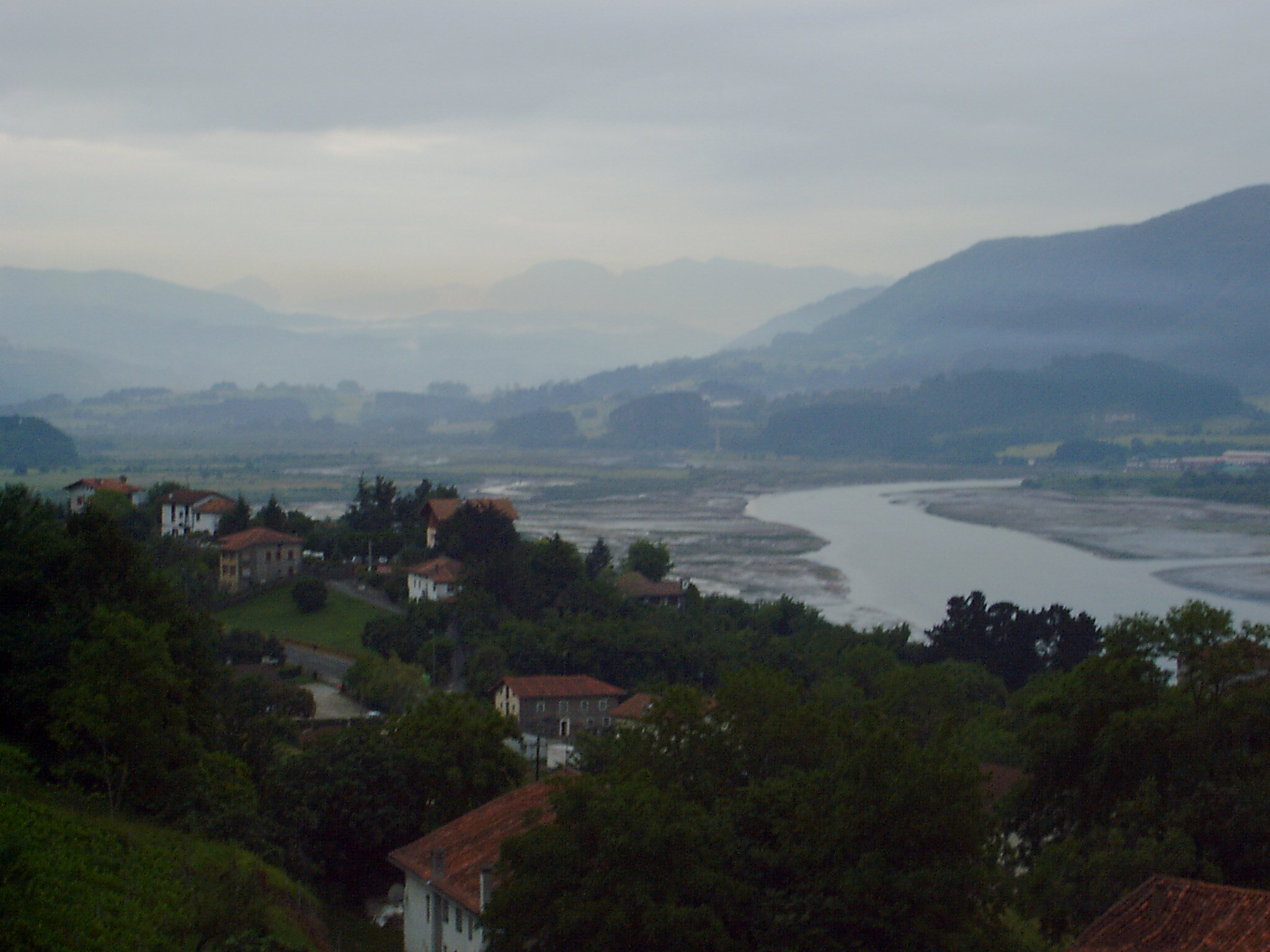
- Marshland in the Oca estuary

Location
- Country: Spain
- State: Basque Country
- Region: Biscay

Physical characteristics
- Mouth
  - coordinates: 43°21′21″N 02°40′17″W
- Length: 17 km (11 mi)

The Oca river (Basque: Oka) is a river of the Cantabrian slope of the Iberian Peninsula that flows through the lands of Biscay, in the Basque Country (Spain).

The Oca river basin is the main part of the Urdaibai Biosphere Reserve, a protected area designated as such by UNESCO in 1984. Its naturalistic richness, especially ornithological, was a fundamental basis for this designation and for its declaration as a Special Protection Area for Birds (SPA) in 1994 and its integration into the Natura 2000 Network. In 1992, it was included in the list of Wetlands of International Importance of the RAMSAR Convention by decision of the Council of Ministers.

There are other rivers named in the same way; in Spain, there is the Oca river that runs through the province of Burgos and is a tributary of the Ebro. In Russia there is an Oká river that is a tributary of the Volga.

== Course ==
It originates with the confluence in Zugastieta of several streams coming from the Goroño mountains, 601 m high; Oiz, 1035 m high; Bizkargi, 563 m high; and Arburu, 552 m high. It runs in a south-north direction until it finally flows into the Urdaibai estuary. It has a length of 17 km.

The Oca crosses land in the municipalities of Mundaka, Sukarrieta, Busturia, Murueta, Forua, Guernica and Lumo, Ajangiz, Mendata, Arratzu, Kortezubi, Gautegiz Arteaga, Muxika and Ibarranguelu.

== Basin ==
The Oca river basin has a surface area of 132 km² and a length of 17 km. The upper part of the basin is formed by a multitude of streams that flow down from the mountains that surround it to the south. It is at the height of Zugastieta that the river becomes an entity. The streams flow in narrow, steep valleys that are covered with a riparian forest and surrounded by Monterey pine (Pinus insignis) plantations. The slopes on the eastern side of the valley are as steep as 250 meters. From Zugastieta, the Oca runs in a stony riverbed and forms rapids and waterfalls.

A few kilometres before Guernica the terrain becomes flat and the riverbed sinuous; from the Villa Foral it becomes a Ria, since the influence of the tide reaches there. Guernica had a river port, where boats arrived from the port of Mundaca, located at the mouth of the estuary. These vessels were called merchant nadichuelos. The existence of the port on the Oca at the height where Guernica is located was the main reason for its foundation, as stated in its Town Charter:

Let all those who see this proivilege letter know that I, Don Tello, with the pleasure of all the people of Biscay, have made in Guernica the town and village that is called Puerto de Guernica.../ "... I command that you shall not owe any duty or thirty percent or price for any ship or Bagel, or any other merchandise, that comes or goes from this place of Guernica."

Before reaching Guernica, the Oca receives on its left bank the Ugarte stream, also called Múgica, which comes from the slopes of Vizcargui, and past the Villa Foral, on the right, its main tributary, the Berrekondo, which comes from the slopes of Oiz, where the Golako also comes from after 15 km. Near the island of San Cristóbal, the Mape is incorporated on the left, which comes from the Sollube mountain, from which it also acquires its name.

Much of the territory belonging to the right side of the basin runs over limestone terrain and forms a karstic system. This means that surface water is scarce and that the rivers that reach the Oca have subway sections, such as the Oma river.

From the moment the estuary is formed, the terrain changes as it approaches the sea. The river deposits sediments, clogging the riverbed and becoming waterlogged as it approaches the sea. In the estuary, the tidal volume is much greater than that of the river. The waters are mixed according to the model of a totally mixed estuary, or vertically homogeneous, although on some occasions there may be slight stratification.

The sediments brought by the river are carried upstream by the tides and form a gently sloping estuarine plain (0.2 m/km from Guernica to Murueta). Cretaceous limestones and Triassic ophites emerge among the sandy sediments along the entire length of the estuary, severely narrowing the valley in some stretches such as Bekoa Island.

From Guernica to Murueta a straight channel was built at the beginning of the 20th century that cut the old riverbed, which was winding. This channel is 5 km long and is known as Corte de la Ría. The meanders became unusable and have been clogged. Part of the marshes formed on both sides of the channel has been drained by structures called munas or polders to use the land thus reclaimed for agricultural work or pastures for livestock grazing. These meadows and pastures of the munas are often a place of refuge for birds during the winter.

The sediments of the river plain's slopes give way to the mud, and these, in a process of progressive mixing, to the sands that occupy the mouth of the estuary. On the right bank is the large sandy area of Laida, while on the left bank is the fishing village of Mundaca.

Closing the mouth of the estuary is the island of Izaro, which forms a small archipelago with the islets Hotzarri and Potorro-harri among others. Izaro was joined to the mainland by the Antzora cape; nowadays it is separated from the mainland by a sandy channel.

=== Use of soil ===
The soils of the basin are mainly used for agriculture and forestry. In the upper part of the basin, most of the land is used for forestry, with pine and eucalyptus plantations for logging. In the lower parts, the use is agricultural and livestock. The areas surrounding the towns are occupied by services for these and by industries of various types, among which the metallurgical, naval, chemical and canning industries stand out.

Since the entire Oca basin is protected as an Urdaibai Biosphere Reserve, its uses are governed by the Guiding Plan for Use and Management, one of the instruments developed by the Law for the Protection and Management of the Uradibai Biosphere Reserve. The first master plan was put into effect in December 1993 and was modified in 2003. The guiding plan attempts to reach a consensus among all those affected by the protection of the Biosphere Reserve, conserving the natural and cultural heritage of the protected area and allowing for the sustainable development of its inhabitants. The master plan is a management and territorial planning tool that allows knowing objectives, instruments, zoning and regulation of the use of the protected rural land. The purpose of the guiding plan is to protect and recover all the ecosystems that exist in the protected area of the Urdaibai Biosphere Reserve, with special emphasis on water (groundwater and surface) and native vegetation, as well as to encourage and promote rational use of rural land.

== Flora and fauna ==
=== Flora ===
The vegetation that develops in Urdaibai has a purely Atlantic base. It abounds in meadows, oak groves, leafy forests and especially plantations of fast-growing conifers (Pinus radiata or insignis). The coastal area is covered with Cantabrian forests of holm oaks and Arbutus. This plant world, where 615 plant species have been described, shelters a rich animal world with a description of 318 vertebrate species, 245 of which are birds.

The vegetation depends on the different environments that occur in the basin. The salinity of the water, the nature of the terrain, and the orientation are factors that influence the predominant type of vegetation. In the upper areas of the basin, along with commercial pine and eucalyptus plantations, there are still some stretches of Atlantic forest of chestnut, oak and ash trees, and gallery forest where alder abounds along with oak, ash, maple and elm trees. Willows can also be seen. The marshes are composed of herbaceous and shrubby nitrophilous vegetation. In areas of high marine influence, with salinity similar to that of the sea and sands or sandy silt soils, the nolti zostera develops. This zone is flooded at high tide. When the soil is silty and has a high organic matter content, maritime spartina develops. When the area is no longer flooded by the tide, or is rarely flooded, there is the development of juncus and sea rushes, and when salinity is reduced, elymus meadows appear.

Most of the midlands are occupied by the Atlantic countryside, which is the area that has been directly intervened by humans. The formation of this area is due to the agricultural and livestock exploitation of the baserri. In this environment, there is a great ecological richness due to the alternation of crops with meadows, heathlands and forests. There is a process of deterioration of this environment due to the abandonment of agricultural work and the planting of pine trees.

=== Fauna ===
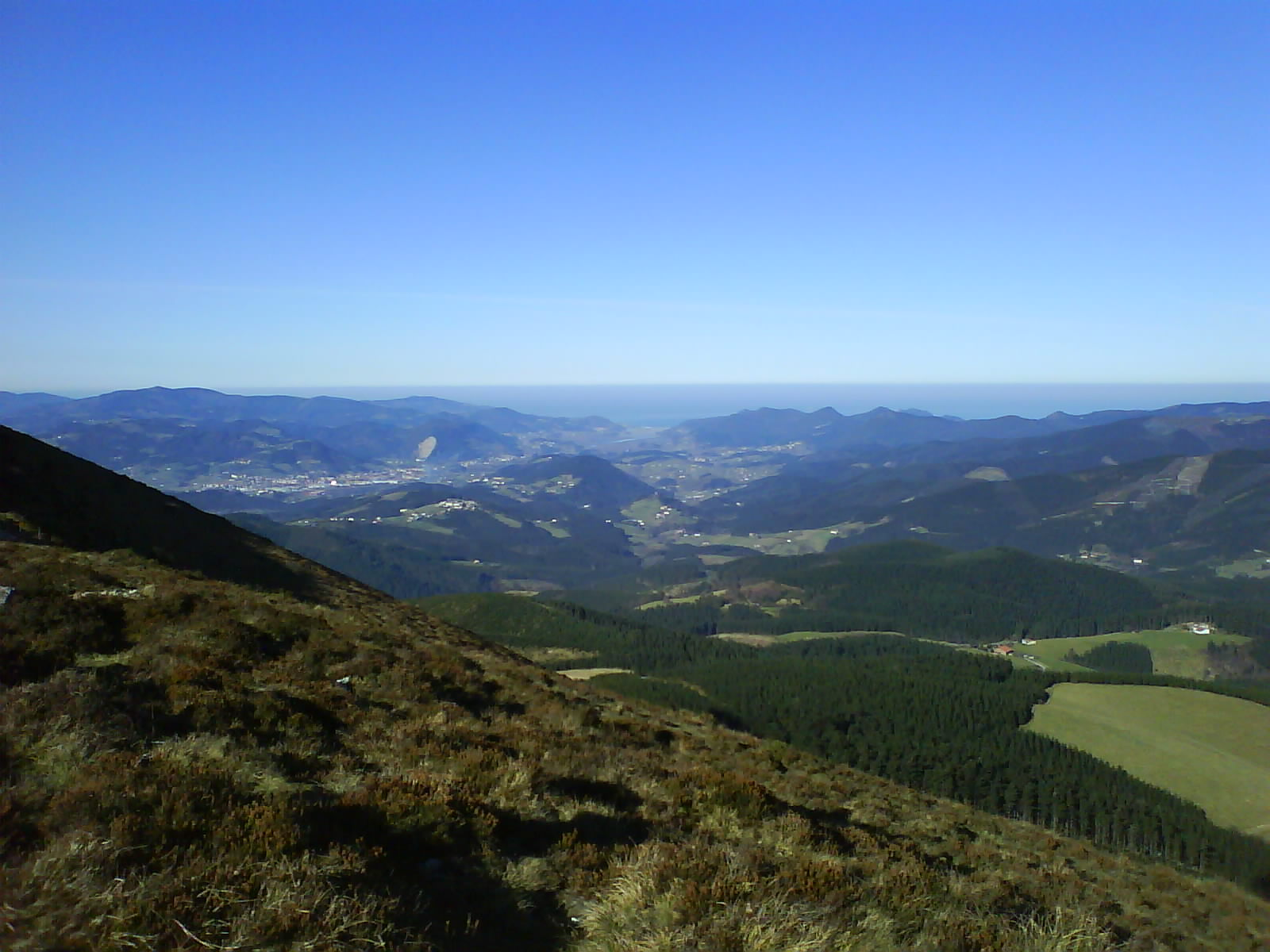
General view of the Oca basin.

Several species of fish and amphibians can be seen in the waters of the Oca and its tributaries. The fish differ with the location of the river course. In the headwaters and upper reaches of the river there are trout, loach, eel and escalo, while in the middle reaches there are also barbel and carp, which become more abundant as the river approaches its mouth, to the detriment of the former. In the estuary there are saltwater species such as the corcón, flounder and eel.

Amphibians are highly stressed by environmental conditions and human pressure. There are a number of amphibian species such as salamanders, marbled newts, toads, common frogs, european tree frogs, iberian frogs and tridactyl skinks.

There is also an important and relevant number of mammal species, both large and small. Of special importance is the case of the European mink, a species in danger of extinction, but there are also the dormouse, polecat and wild cat, which are protected. There are also rabbits, genets, martens, water shrews, wild boar and roe deer. You can see some American mink escaped from a farm.

=== Birdlife ===
The most significant fauna is poultry. This was the basis for establishing the protection of these territories. The reserve's location in the middle of the migratory route makes its marshes a wintering and migratory stopover (resting and feeding) place for many of the birds that migrate between the continents of Europe and Africa. In addition to this refuge function, sedentary and summer species use the reserve as a nesting site.

Since 2009, the study of the birds of the marsh and the surrounding area has been carried out through the Urdaibai Bird Center, an ornithological centre of reference at European level. Among the projects carried out are the study of spatial ecology and habitat use, migratory movements, biology, population dynamics and other aspects of the birds of this protected environment. Through scientific banding, studies are carried out with the objective of deepening the knowledge of the species.

According to the latest Ornithological Yearbook of the Gautegiz Arteaga wetland by the Urdaibai Bird Center, the most representative species include the grey heron, spoonbill, osprey, bittern, black-winged stilt, greenshank, little grebe, great egret, wigeons, Hobby, aquatic warbler and kingfisher. All of them can be observed at different times of the year. In Urdaibai there is presence of rare or very rare species in Spanish wetlands such as the brant, common eider, velvet scoter or long-tailed duck as well as the barnacle goose and whooper swan whose numbers increase with the winter season.

== Tributaries ==
- On the right side
1. Berrekondo
2. Golako
3. Oma River
- On the left side
1. Ugarte or Múgica
2. Busturia
3. Sollube

=== Golako river ===
With good water quality, which is shown in its rich and varied community of macroinvertebrates. It has areas of scenic value for the landscape endowed with great arboreal vegetation and a great diversity of fluvial ecosystems.

On its banks are located different mills and forges such as those of Olazaharra and Uharka; the dam of the latter currently feeds a mini hydroelectric plant.

=== Oma river ===
It runs through the valleys of Basondo and Oma under the limestone mass of Ereñozar. The limestone nature of the terrain has formed a karstic system that is striking for the numerous sinkholes that can be observed and the large number of caves. The limestone terrain is the basis for the development of the Cantabrian holm oak forest, with one of the most important holm oak forests in Biscay. The remains of a mill can still be seen.

== See also ==
- Busturialdea
- Urdaibai estuary
