= Busturialdea =

Coordinates: 43°20′52″N 2°41′33″W

Busturialde - Urdaibai
- Eskualdea / Comarca
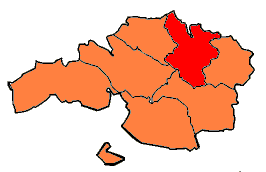
- Country: Spain
- Autonomous community: Basque Country
- Province: Biscay
- Capitals: Bermeo and Guernica
- Municipalities: List: Bermeo, Mundaka, Sukarrieta, Busturia, Murueta, Forua, Guernica, Errigoiti, Morga, Ajangiz, Mendata, Arratzu, Muxika, Nabarniz, Kortezubi, Gautegiz Arteaga, Ibarrangelu, Elantxobe, Ereño, Ea

Area
  - Total: 220 km^{2} (85 sq mi)

Population
  - Total: 46.000
- Time zone: UTC+1 (CET)
  - Summer (DST): UTC+2 (CEST)
- Largest municipality: Bermeo (17.144)

Busturialdea, also named Busturialde - Urdaibai is a comarca of the province of Biscay, in the Basque Country, Spain. It is the heir of "Busturia", one of the original merindades that used to compose the province of Biscay – this should not be confused with Busturia, a municipality located in this region. Busturialdea is a diminished portion of the same original subregion and has two capital cities; Bermeo and Gernika-Lumo. It is one of the seven comarcas that compose the province of Biscay.

== History ==
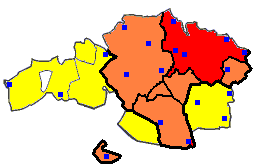
Historical Busturialdea (red) in the context of formation of Biscay (orange)

Busturia used to be one of the merindades of Biscay and included a larger territory than the current one of Busturialdea, as it reached the province of Gipuzkoa.

Busturialdea was historically the core of Biscay: the capitals of the province, Bermeo and Gernika, were located in it; the village of Mundaka, also belonging to this region, had the privilege of speaking always first in the sessions of its parliament and for some time, the harbour of Bermeo was the main portuary facility, until Bilbao was founded in 1300.

Busturialdea and its lush estuary was also important in prehistory. Particularly significant is its site of Santimamiñe cave, that yielded a full sequence of human habitation from Neanderthals to the Iron Age, and beautiful Magdalenian cave paintings.

== Geography ==
Busturialdea is located at the north of the province of Biscay, limiting with the comarcas of Lea-Artibai on the east, Uribe and Greater Bilbao on the west and Durangaldea on the south. The Bay of Biscay limits at north.

The comarca is located along the Urdaibai estuary, which has been named Biosphere Reserve by UNESCO in 1984

== Municipalities ==
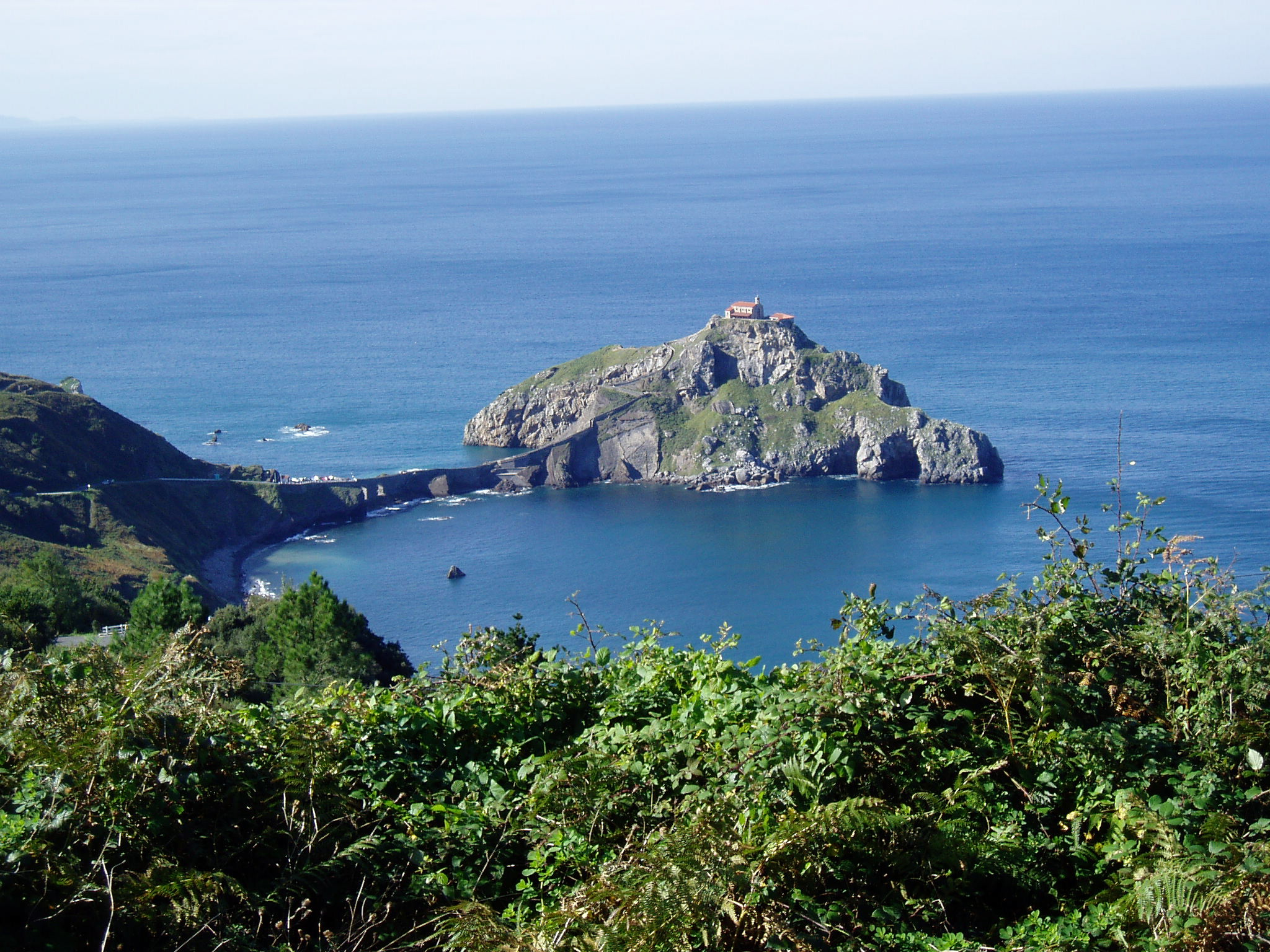
San Juan de Gaztelugatxe, Bermeo

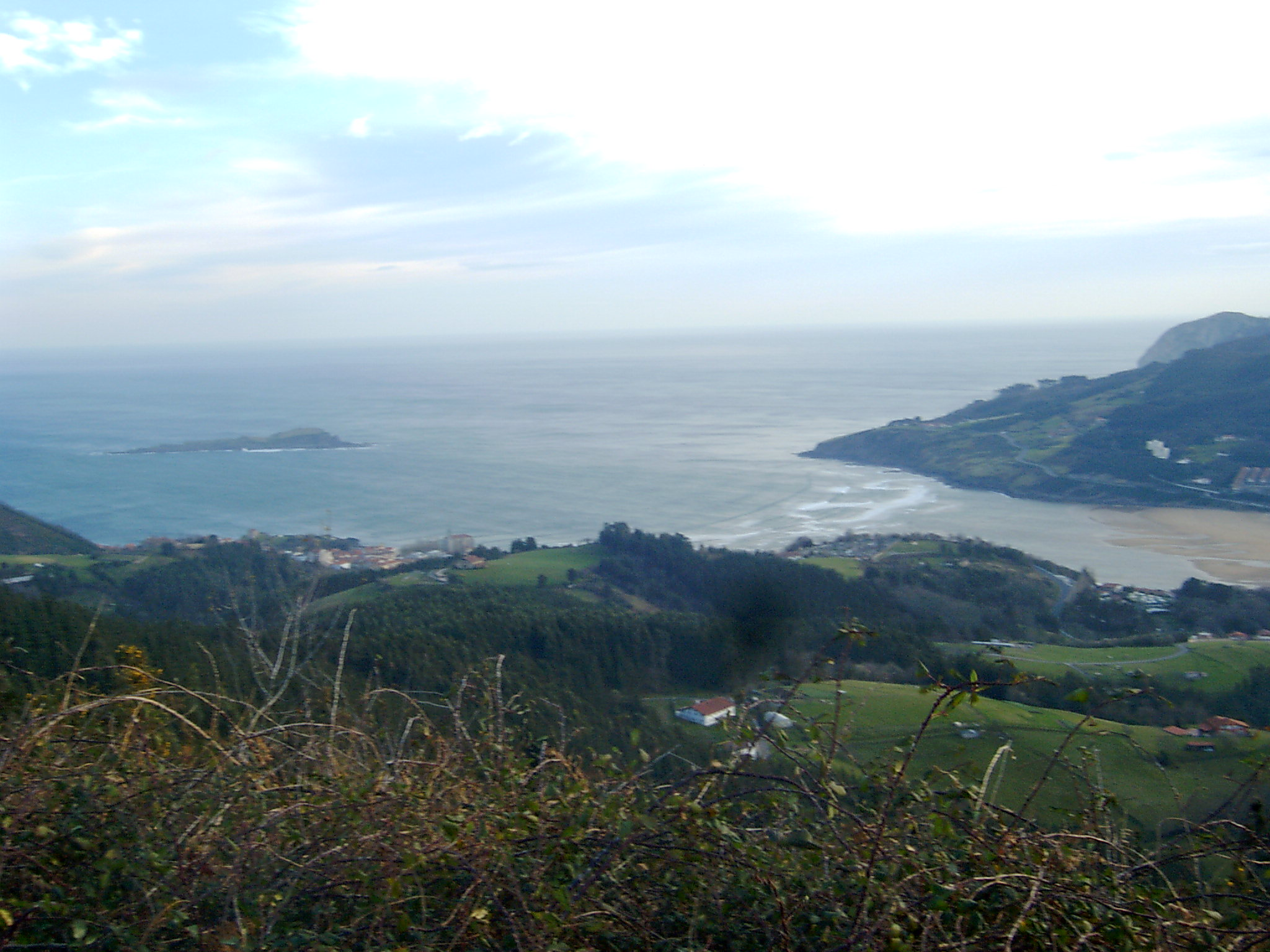
Urdaibai

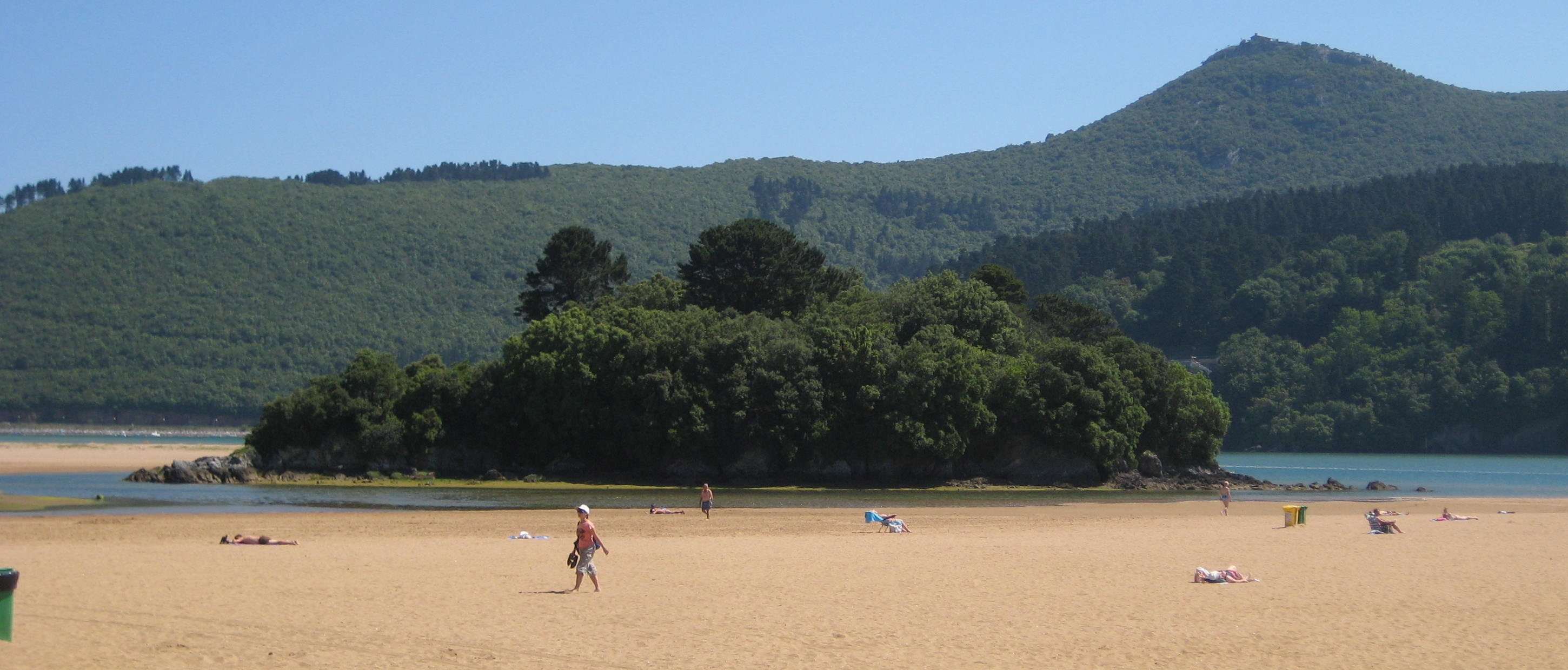
San Antonio beach, Sukarrieta

Municipality	Population	Territory km^{2}
Ajangiz	457	7.35
Arratzu	388	10.34
Bermeo	17,144	34.12
Busturia	1,637	19.63
Kortezubi	423	11.91
Ea	886	14.17
Elantxobe	402	1.85
Ereño	278	10.67
Errigoiti	537	16.42
Forua	969	7.94
Gautegiz Arteaga	910	13.57
Gernika-Lumo	16,812	8.47
Ibarrangelu	641	15.56
Mendata	378	22.39
Morga	406	17.6
Muxika	1,468	50.02
Mundaka	1,940	4.15
Murueta	302	5.45
Nabarniz	227	11.75
Sukarrieta	357	2.3
