= Elantxobe =

- Municipality
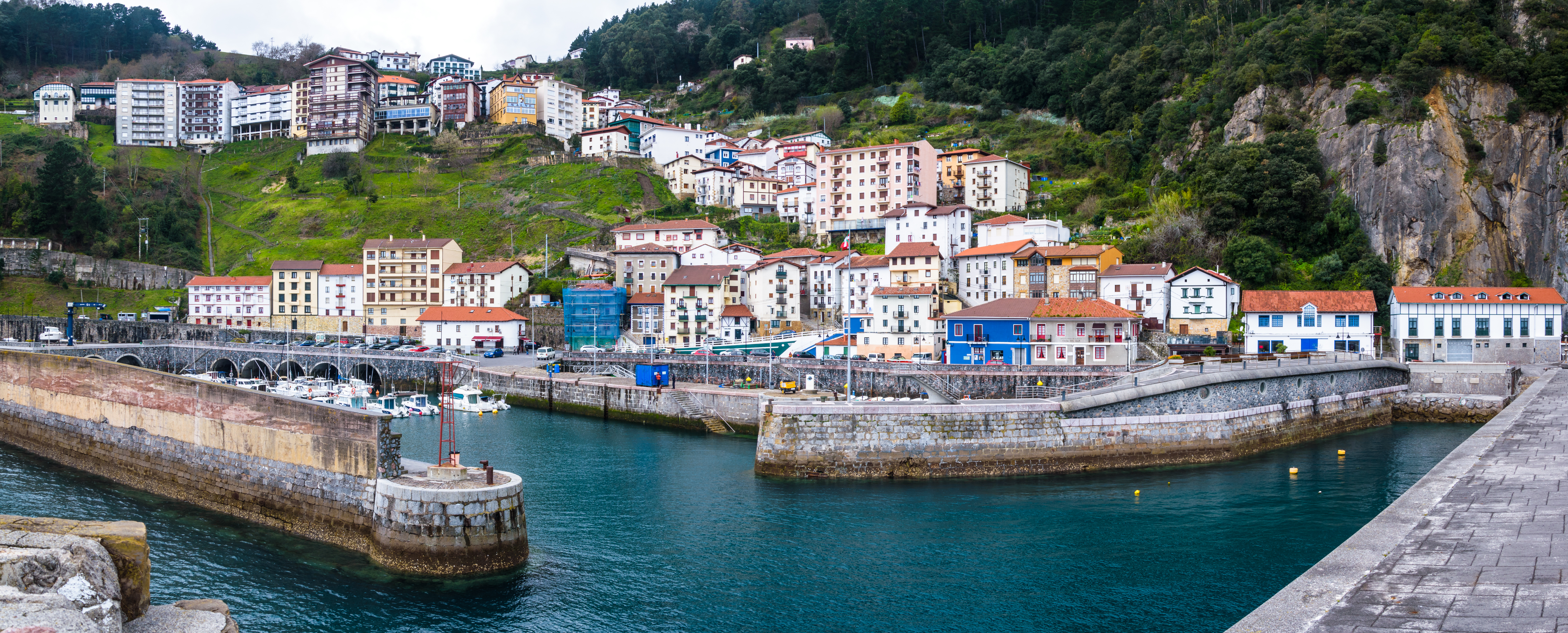

- Coat of arms

- Location of Elantxobe within the Basque Country Elantxobe (Spain)
- Coordinates: 43°24′14″N 2°38′09″W
- Country: Spain
- Autonomous community: Basque Country
- Province: Biscay
- Comarca: Busturialdea
- Founded: 1858

Government
  - Mayor: Koldo Miren Olagibel Bakeriz (Bildu)

Area
  - Total: 1.85 km^{2} (0.71 sq mi)
- Elevation: 80 m (260 ft)

Population (2025-01-01)
  - Total: 320
  - Density: 170/km^{2} (450/sq mi)
- Demonym: Basque: elantxobetar
- Time zone: UTC+1 (CET)
  - Summer (DST): UTC+2 (CEST)
- Postal code: 48310
- Official language(s): Basque; Spanish
- Website: Official website

Elantxobe is a town and municipality located in the province of Biscay, in the autonomous community of Basque Country, northern Spain.

== History ==
The town emerged in 1524 as a fishing port. It gaining some importance in the 17th century as a defensive location on the Biscayan coast, which is currently used as a marina. Until 1858 it was a neighbourhood of the nearby municipality of Ibarrangelu. The town celebrates the festival of its patron, San Nicolás de Bari, on 6 December.

== Cityscape ==
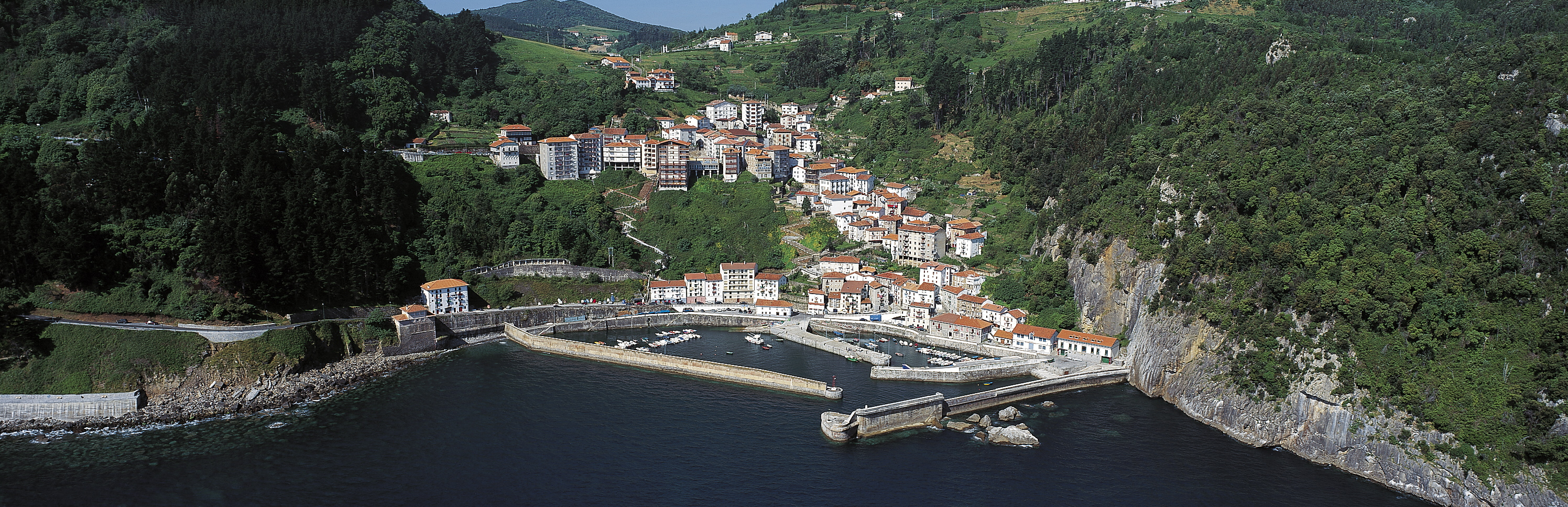
The harbour and settlement
