= Nabarniz =

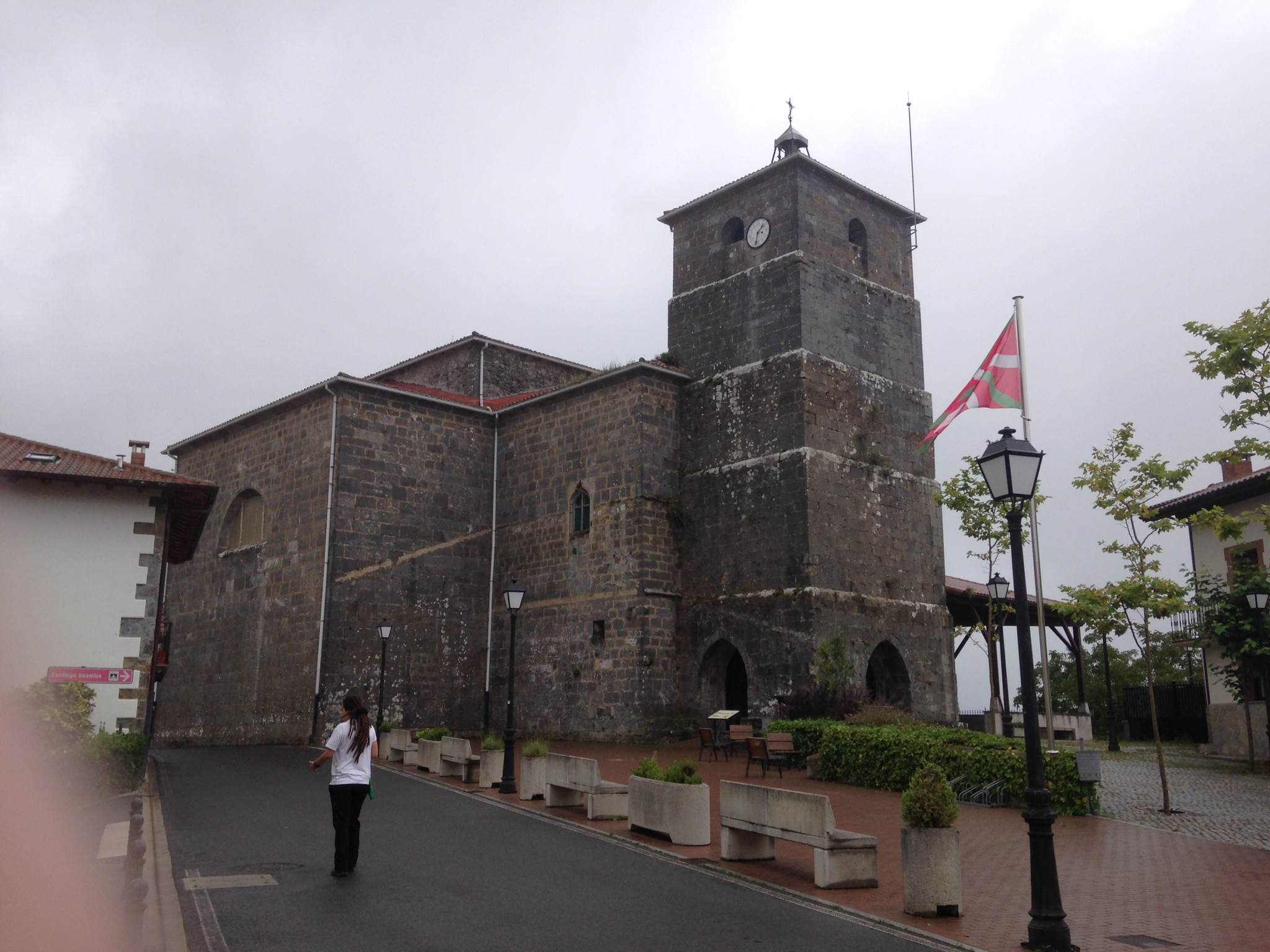
- Church of Santa María de Gorritiz in Nabarniz

- Flag Coat of arms

- Location of Nabarniz within the Basque Country
- Coordinates: 43°19′17.75″N 2°35′3.84″W
- Country: Spain
- Autonomous community: Basque Country
- Province: Biscay
- Comarca: Busturialdea

Area
  - Total: 11.75 km^{2} (4.54 sq mi)
- Elevation: 347 m (1,138 ft)

Population (2025-01-01)
  - Total: 264
  - Density: 22.5/km^{2} (58.2/sq mi)
- Time zone: UTC+1 (CET)
  - Summer (DST): UTC+2 (CEST)
- Postal code: 48312
- Website: www.nabarniz.org

Nabarniz is a town and municipality located in the province of Biscay, in the autonomous community of Basque Country, northern Spain.
