= Ea, Spain =

Ea
- Municipality
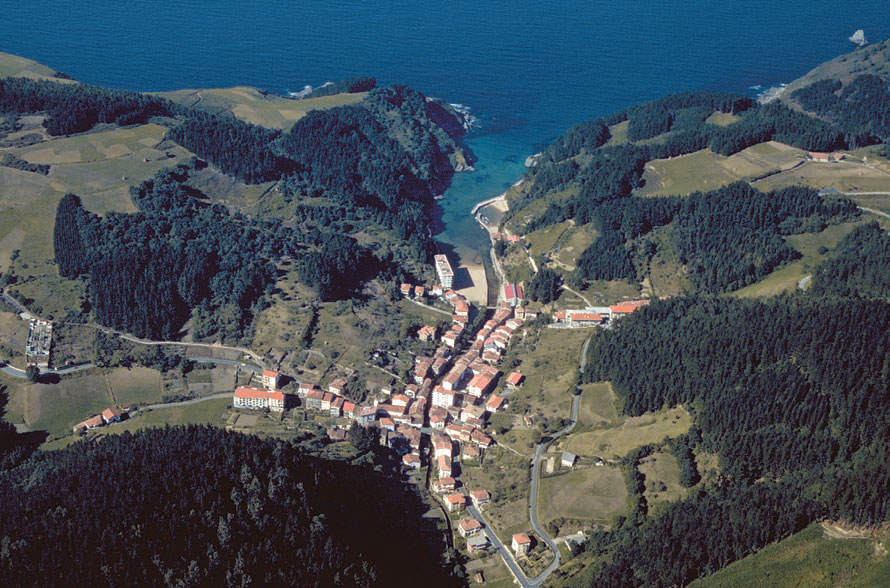

- Flag Coat of arms

- Location of Ea within the Basque Country
- Coordinates: 43°22′53″N 2°34′57″W
- Country: Spain
- Autonomous community: Basque Country
- Province: Biscay
- Comarca: Busturialdea

Government
  - Mayor: Juan Luis Landazabal Lamikiz (Bildu)

Area
  - Total: 14.17 km^{2} (5.47 sq mi)
- Elevation: 10 m (33 ft)

Population (2025-01-01)
  - Total: 824
  - Density: 58.2/km^{2} (151/sq mi)
- Demonym(s): Spanish: Earra; Basque: Eatar
- Time zone: UTC+1 (CET)
  - Summer (DST): UTC+2 (CEST)
- Postal code: 48287

Ea (also pronounced Ie in local Basque) is a town and municipality located in the province of Biscay, in the autonomous community of Basque Country, northern Spain.

The town has three boroughs: Ea, Bedarona and Natxitua. The main one, Ea, is the most populated of the municipality, which has a total population of 865 (2014).

== Geography ==
Ea is located on the coast, 50 km northeast from Bilbao, in the bottom of a tiny estuary that breaks through the cliffs of the Bay of Biscay. The Ea river crosses the town, which has three bridges, the oldest one being the so-called "Roman Bridge" (featured in the coat of arms) that is really a medieval one. There is a small fishing port, but the predominant activities of the town are agriculture, silviculture and cattle, with many farms disperse around the typically basque countryside.

== History ==
The area was a rural one, centered on the parishes of Natxitua and Bedarona. In the 16th century, fishermen from both villages founded a new permanent settlement at the bottom of the tiny estuary of the river Ea. After two centuries, the settlement became far more important than its two neighboring villages, so finally a new municipality was created, uniting the two former villages and with capital in Ea. As a remainder of its past as two separated parishes, Ea has two main churches, one at each bank of the river.

== Transport ==
There is a taxi service in the town.

== Fiestas ==
The first fiesta in the calendar is San Juan, from the night of the 23rd until the 26th of June. On the 16th of July the town celebrates The Virgin of Carmen, patron saint of fishermen. San Ignacio takes place in the Bedarona neighborhood on the 31st of July. During the first weekend of August there is the Gazte Eguna rock festival in Natxitua. On August 24 the people of the town gather together for San Bartolome day. There is a paella championship, traditional Basque sports and dancing at night. There is an end-of-summer party on the last weekend of August.

== Culture ==
=== Days Of Poetry ===
Every year since 2003, for three days in July, members of the cultural workshop HEA, inspired by the Basque poet and Ea summer visitor Gabriel Aresti, organize the poetry festival Eako Poesia Egunak (Days of Poetry in Ea). The event incorporates dance, poetry, concerts and theater and has become a major event in the Basque cultural calendar. The 2014 edition is from the 15th to the 17th of July.

== Gallery ==
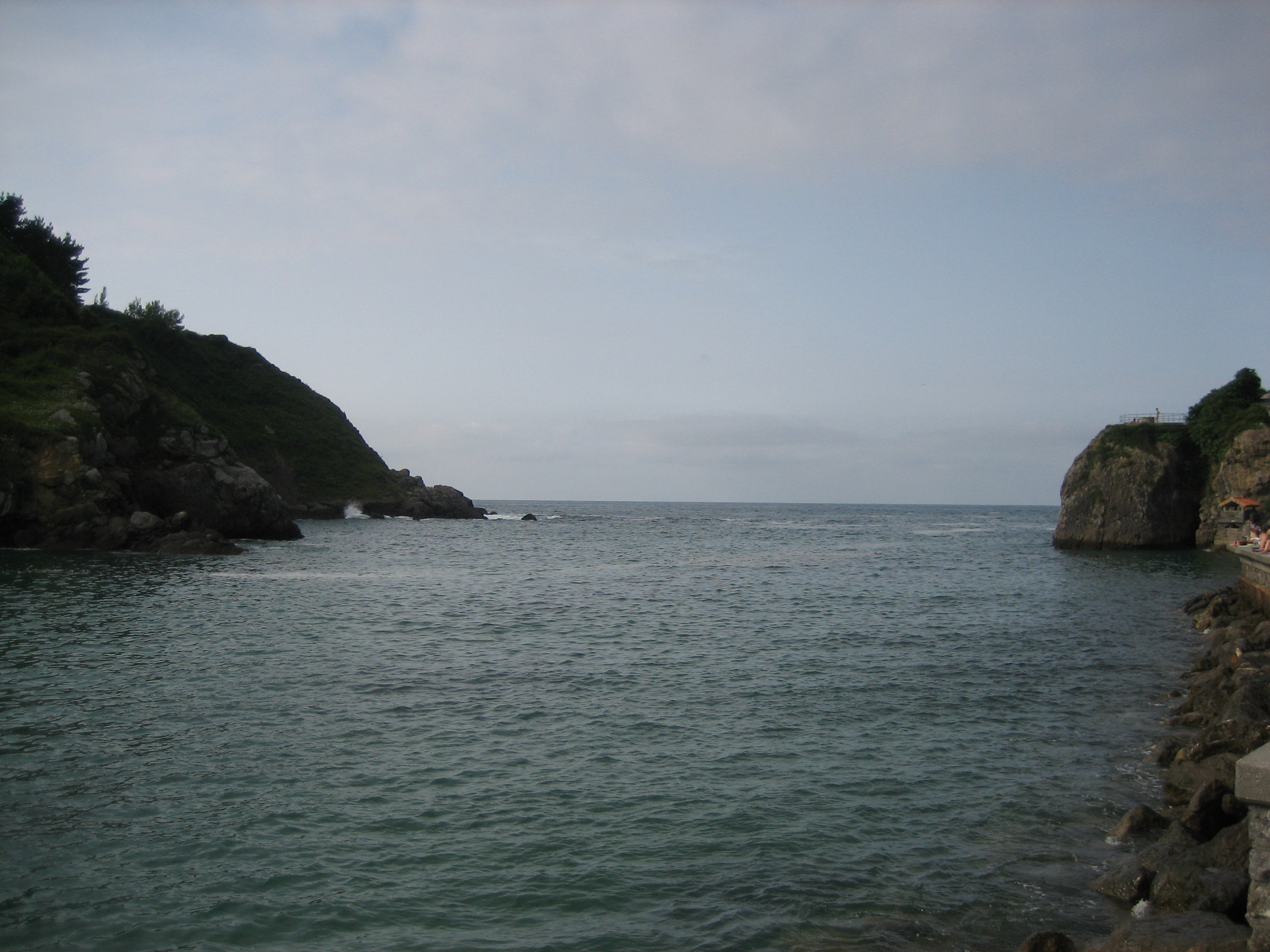
Estuary, looking to the Bay of Biscay.

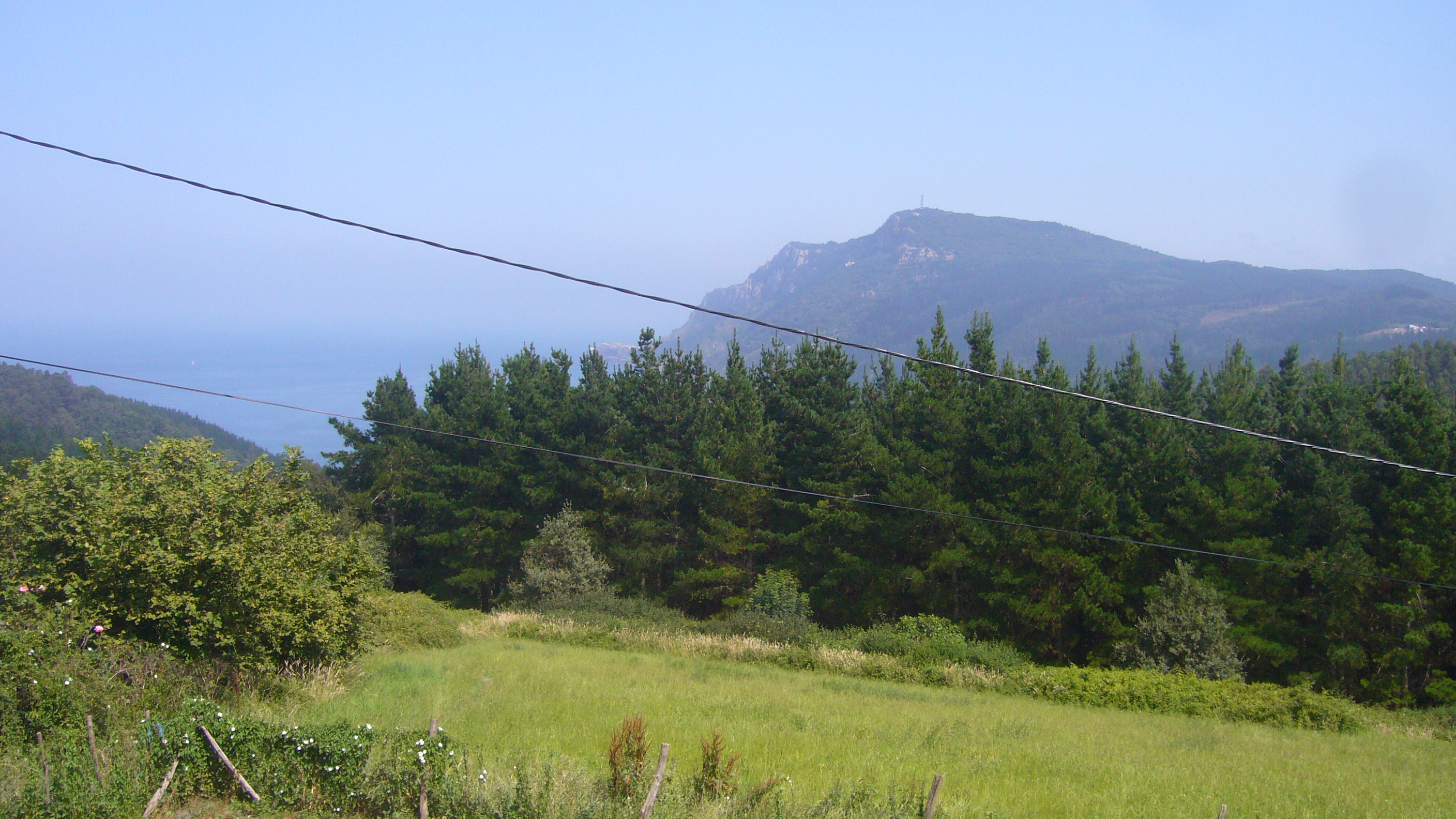
Rural coast landscape from Bedarona.

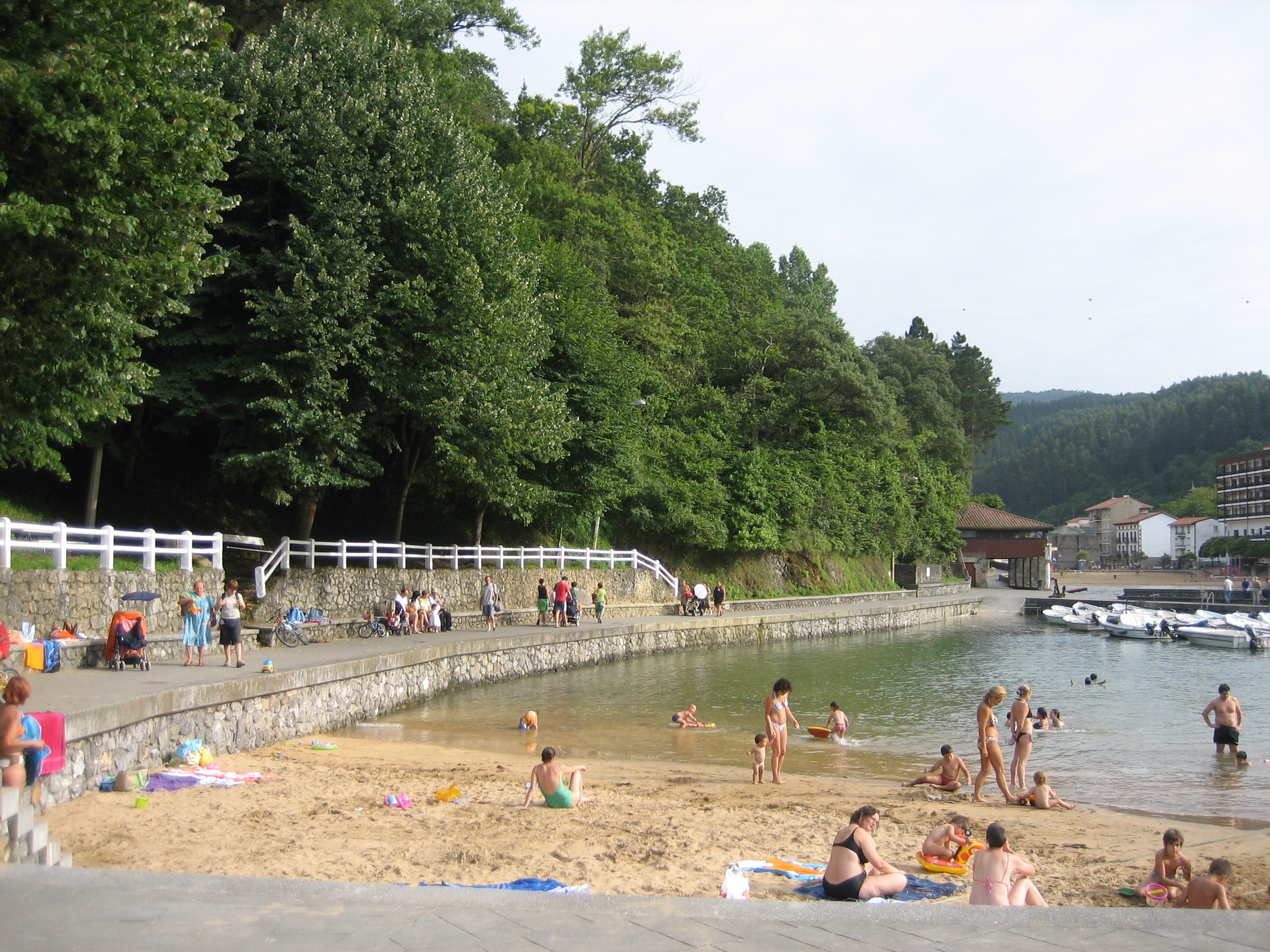
The fishing port and the beaches.

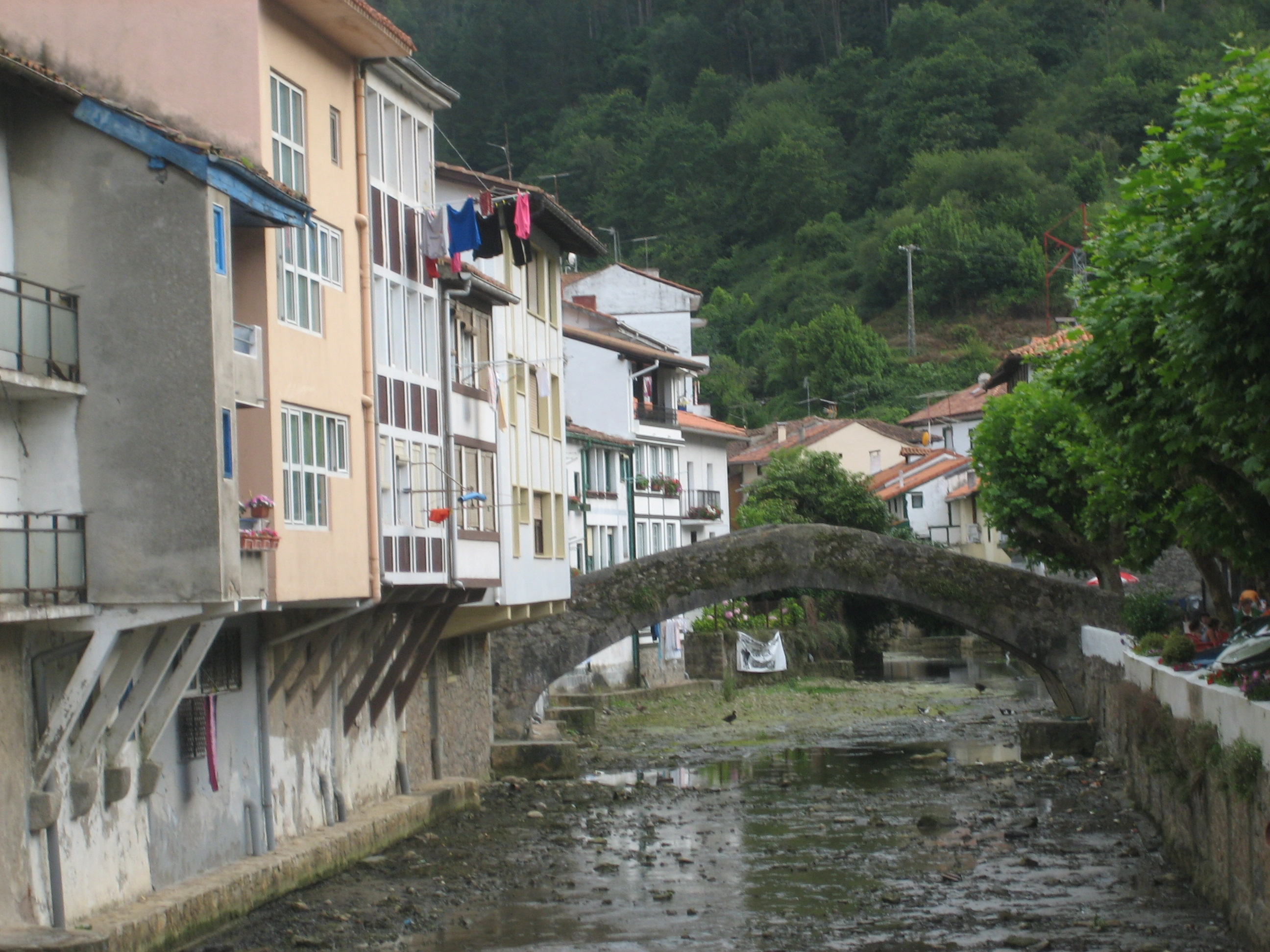
Closeup of the Roman Bridge.
