= Morga =

- Municipality
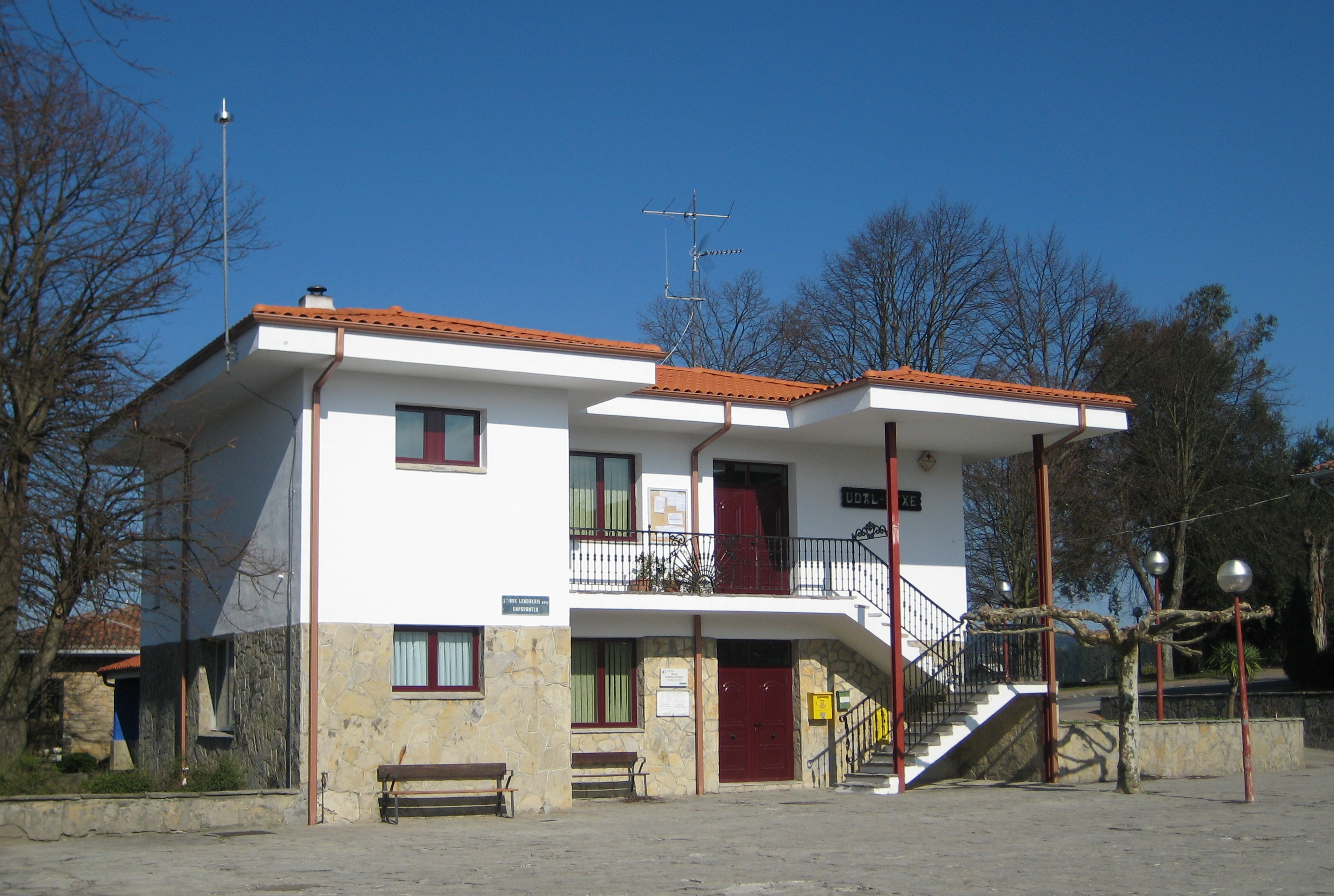
- Town hall

- Flag Coat of arms

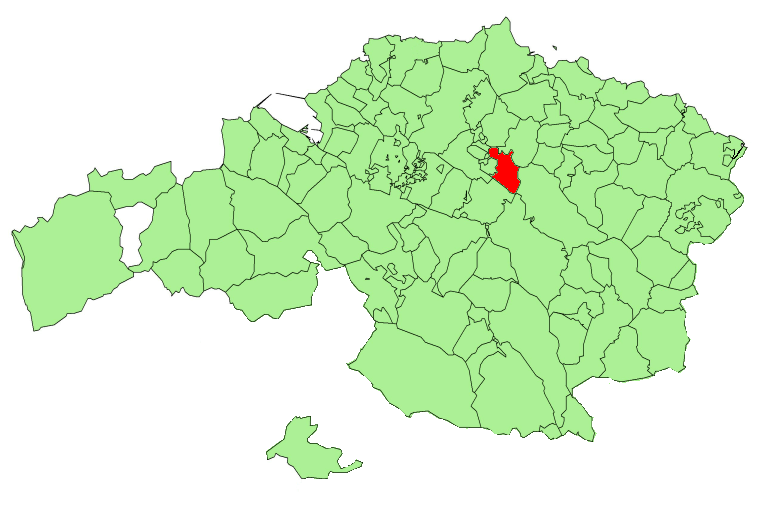

- Location of Morga within the Basque Country Location of Morga within Spain
- Coordinates: 43°17′0″N 2°45′0″W
- Country: Spain
- Autonomous community: Basque Country
- Province: Biscay
- Comarca: Busturialdea

Government
  - Mayor: Arkaitz Villa Olea

Area
  - Total: 17.6 km^{2} (6.8 sq mi)
- Elevation: 205 m (673 ft)

Population (2025-01-01)
  - Total: 416
  - Density: 23.6/km^{2} (61.2/sq mi)
- Demonym: Morgatarra
- Time zone: UTC+1 (CET)
  - Summer (DST): UTC+2 (CEST)
- Postal code: 48115
- Website: Official website

Morga is a municipality located in the province of Biscay, in the autonomous community of Basque Country, northern Spain.
