= Ereño =

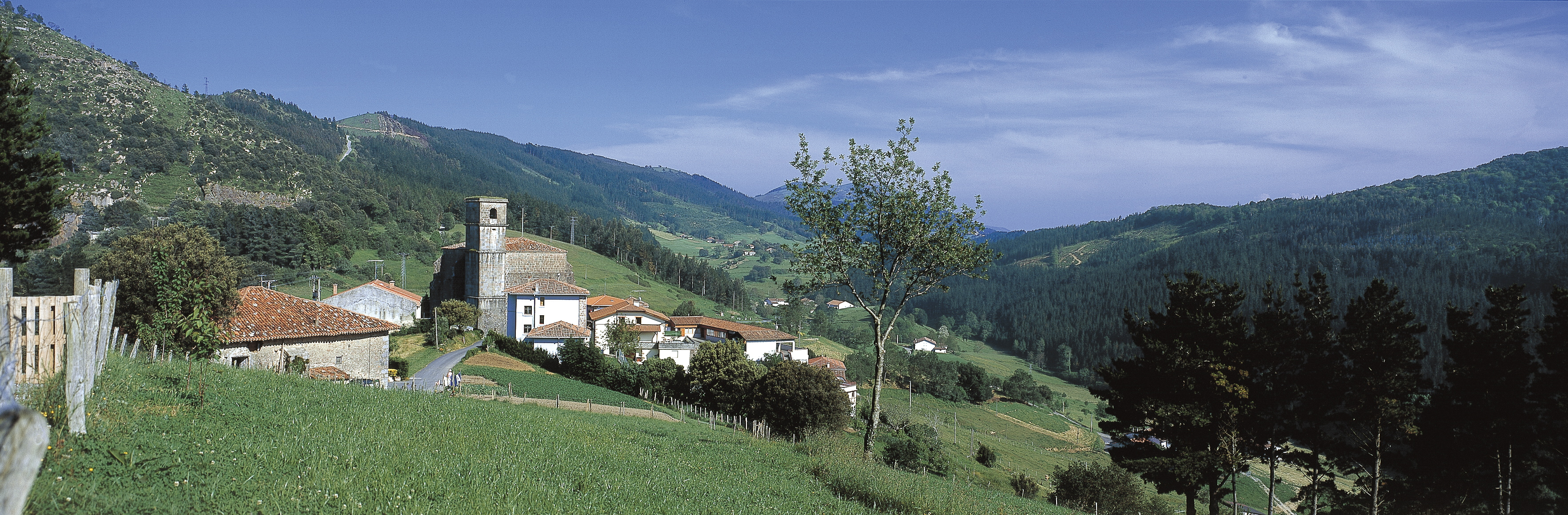
- View of Ereño

- Coat of arms

- Location of Ereño within the Basque Country Location of Ereño within Spain
- Coordinates: 43°21′04″N 2°36′57″W
- Country: Spain
- Autonomous community: Basque Country
- Province: Biscay
- Comarca: Busturialdea

Government
  - Mayor: Joseba Zarragoikoetxea Zenicacelaya

Area
  - Total: 10.67 km^{2} (4.12 sq mi)
- Elevation: 278 m (912 ft)

Population (2025-01-01)
  - Total: 275
  - Density: 25.8/km^{2} (66.8/sq mi)
- Time zone: UTC+1 (CET)
  - Summer (DST): UTC+2 (CEST)
- Postal code: 48313
- Website: www.ereno.org

Ereño is a town and municipality located in the province of Biscay, in the autonomous community of the Basque Country, northern Spain.

Ereño is famous for its ″marble″. In the 1st century CE the Romans were mining the quarries, which are no longer being used. There are literary references that call Ereño the "capital of the marble route". This material can be found in numerous buildings in Urdaibai and also on the other side of the ocean. The decorative limestone Rojo Ereño was named one of the IUGS Heritage Stones in 2024. According to historian Tomás de Goikolea, Ereño was built in the 9th century and the residents of the town may be direct descendants of the inhabitants of the Santimamiñe cave.

On 29 September, the San Miguel festival, a popular mass is held and a pilgrimage is done.
