= Arratzu =

- Municipality
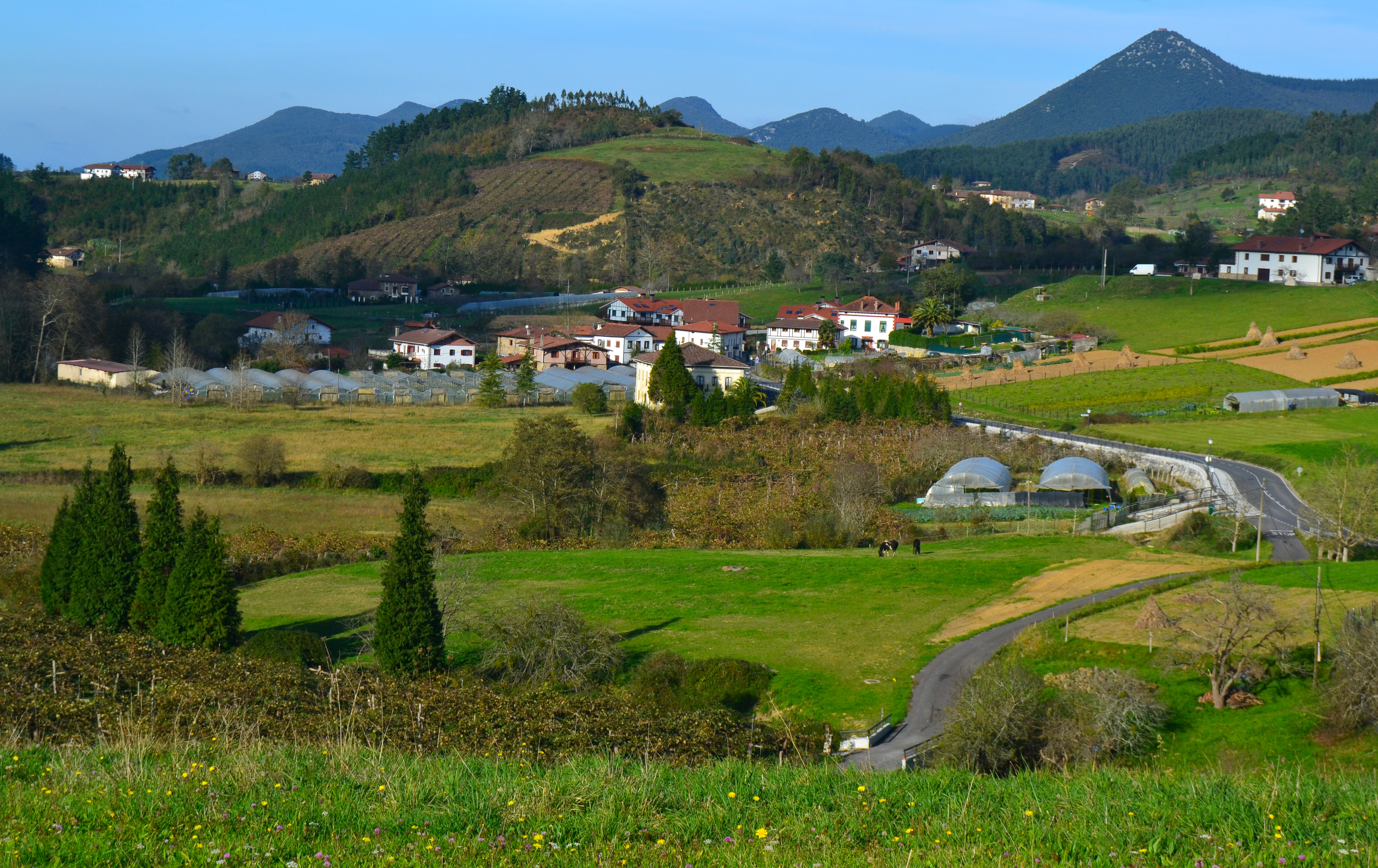

- Coat of arms

- Location of Arratzu within the Basque Country
- Coordinates: 43°19′10″N 2°38′35″W
- Country: Spain
- Autonomous community: Basque Country
- Province: Biscay
- Comarca: Busturialdea

Government
  - Mayor: Josu Sabin Olano (PNV)

Area
  - Total: 10.34 km^{2} (3.99 sq mi)
- Elevation: 40 m (130 ft)

Population (2025-01-01)
  - Total: 417
  - Density: 40.3/km^{2} (104/sq mi)
- Demonym: Basque: arratzuarra
- Time zone: UTC+1 (CET)
  - Summer (DST): UTC+2 (CEST)
- Postal code: 4838
- Official language(s): Basque; Spanish
- Website: Official website

Arratzu is a town and municipality located in the province of Biscay, in the autonomous community of the Basque Country, northern Spain.
