= Errigoiti =

Coordinates: 43°19′12″N 2°43′26″W

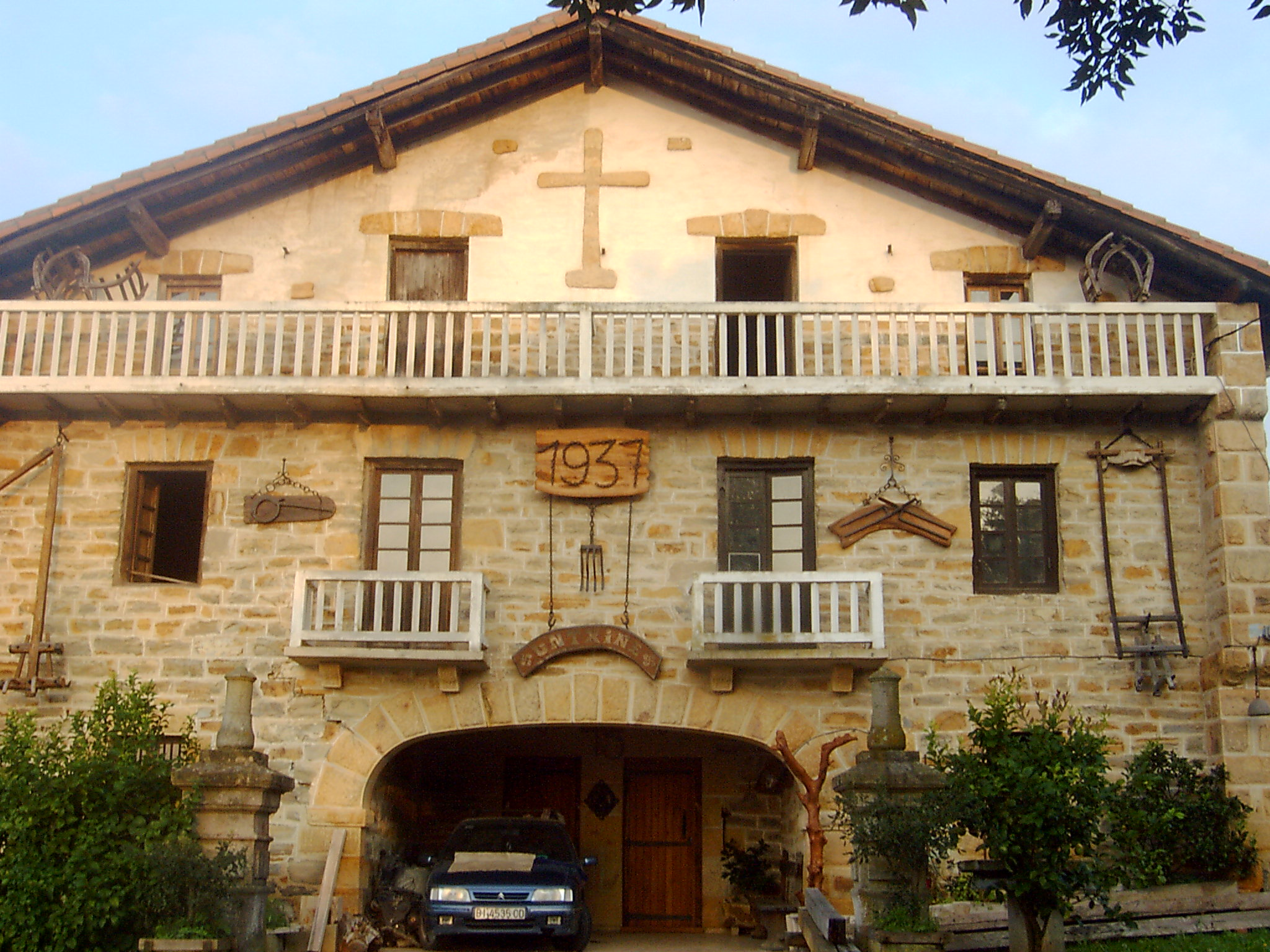
- A farmhouse in Erregoiti

- Flag Coat of arms

- Location in Spain.
- Country: Spain
- Autonomous community: Biscay

Government
  - Mayor: Iñaki Madariaga Otazua

Area
  - Total: 16.42 km^{2} (6.34 sq mi)
- Elevation: 241 m (791 ft)

Population (2025-01-01)
  - Total: 499
  - Density: 30.4/km^{2} (78.7/sq mi)
- Time zone: UTC+1 (CET)
  - Summer (DST): UTC+2 (CEST)
- Website: www.errigoiti.net

Errigoiti is a town and municipality located in the province of Biscay, in the autonomous community of Basque Country, northern Spain.

== Composition ==
Errigoitia municipality consists of several neighborhoods. It has the peculiarity that the parish church is located outside the urban core, near the cemetery. The old school and the shrine of San Antonio and some villages, form the Eleizalde neighborhood. The neighborhoods that make up the municipality, and their populations, are:

- Atxikas-Rekalde (57)
- Eleizalde-Olabarri (159)
- Metxikas (117)
- Uria (178)
