= Ajangiz =

- Municipality
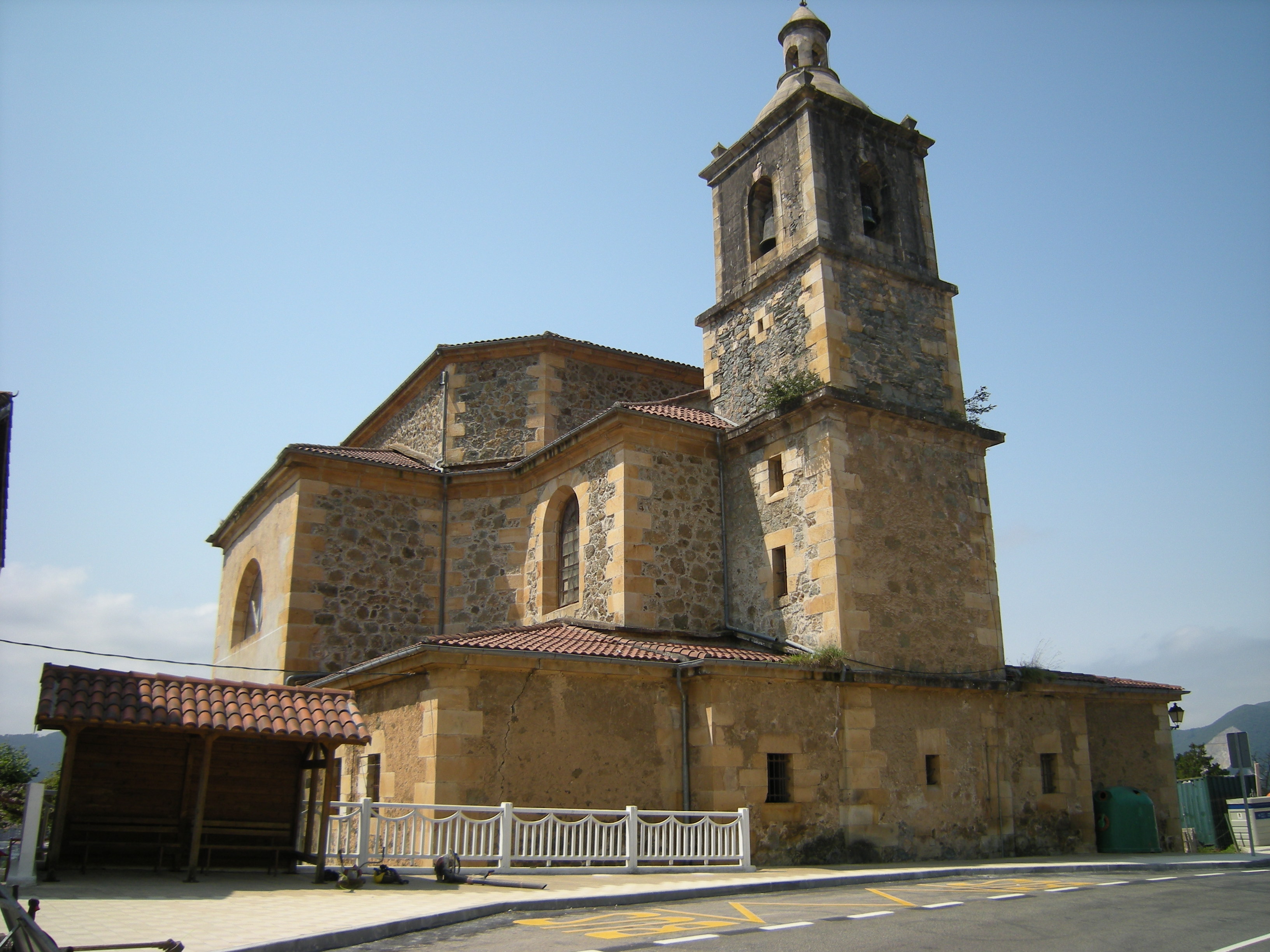
- Church of the Ascension in Ajangiz

- Flag Coat of arms

- Location of Ajangiz within the Basque Country Location of Ajangiz within Spain
- Coordinates: 43.301°N 2.671°W
- Country: Spain
- Autonomous community: Basque Country
- Province: Biscay
- Comarca: Busturialdea
- Founded: 1991

Government
  - Mayor: Mikel Ander Zubizarreta González-Rua (Bildu)

Area
  - Total: 7.35 km^{2} (2.84 sq mi)
- Elevation: 60 m (200 ft)

Population (2025-01-01)
  - Total: 458
  - Density: 62.3/km^{2} (161/sq mi)
- Time zone: UTC+1 (CET)
- Postal code: 48320
- Website: Official website

Ajangiz (Spanish: Ajanguiz) is a town and municipality in the province of Biscay, in the Basque Country. It is located in the Busturialdea comarca, and was part of the municipality of Gernika-Lumo between 1940 and 1991.

== Etymology ==
Ajangiz is one of the Basque toponyms with an -iz suffix. Julio Caro Baroja argued that most of these toponyms come from the Latin suffix -icus. According to Baroja, Ajangiz might come from a patronymic form of Allianus, a documented Latin name, which would become Allianicus with the -icus suffix and Allianici when referring to the descendants of Allianus. The oldest reference to the town is Axanguiz, which might have evolved from Allianici; Allianici → Axianici → Axanguici → Axanguiz.

== History ==
The Busturialdea region was heavily inhabited during the prehistory by groups of farmers and livestock farmers during the Neolithic and the Bronze Age (between 5500 and 2800 BC), proved by the archeological sites found across the town. The first reference of the town comes from a document by Friar Martín de Coscojales, who mentions how the "Lord of the High Asturias of Oviedo" escaped from the King of Asturias, reaching Biscay and founding a house with his own name in the town of Axangiz, in the year 788. The town is further mentioned in several records of the War of the Bands.

As it is recorded in the documents from the 16th century, Ajangiz held the eleventh position at the Juntas of Gernika, with the legal status of "ledanía". Ajangiz would become an elizate in the 18th century. A small hermitage held the ecclesiastical archives until the year 1844, when the parish church was finished. In 1943, the town was annexed to the municipality of Gernika. It regained its autonomy in 1991.

== Geography ==
Ajangiz is located in the northern half of the Biscay province, in the northwestern Basque Country. The town is located on a hillside less than 4 km away from Gernika-Lumo, the capital of the Busturialdea comarca. The boundary between Ajangiz and Gernika-Lumo is the River Oka. Ajangiz is divided into two neighborhoods, Mendieta, where is located the town hall, and Kanpantxu.
