= Sukarrieta =

- Municipality
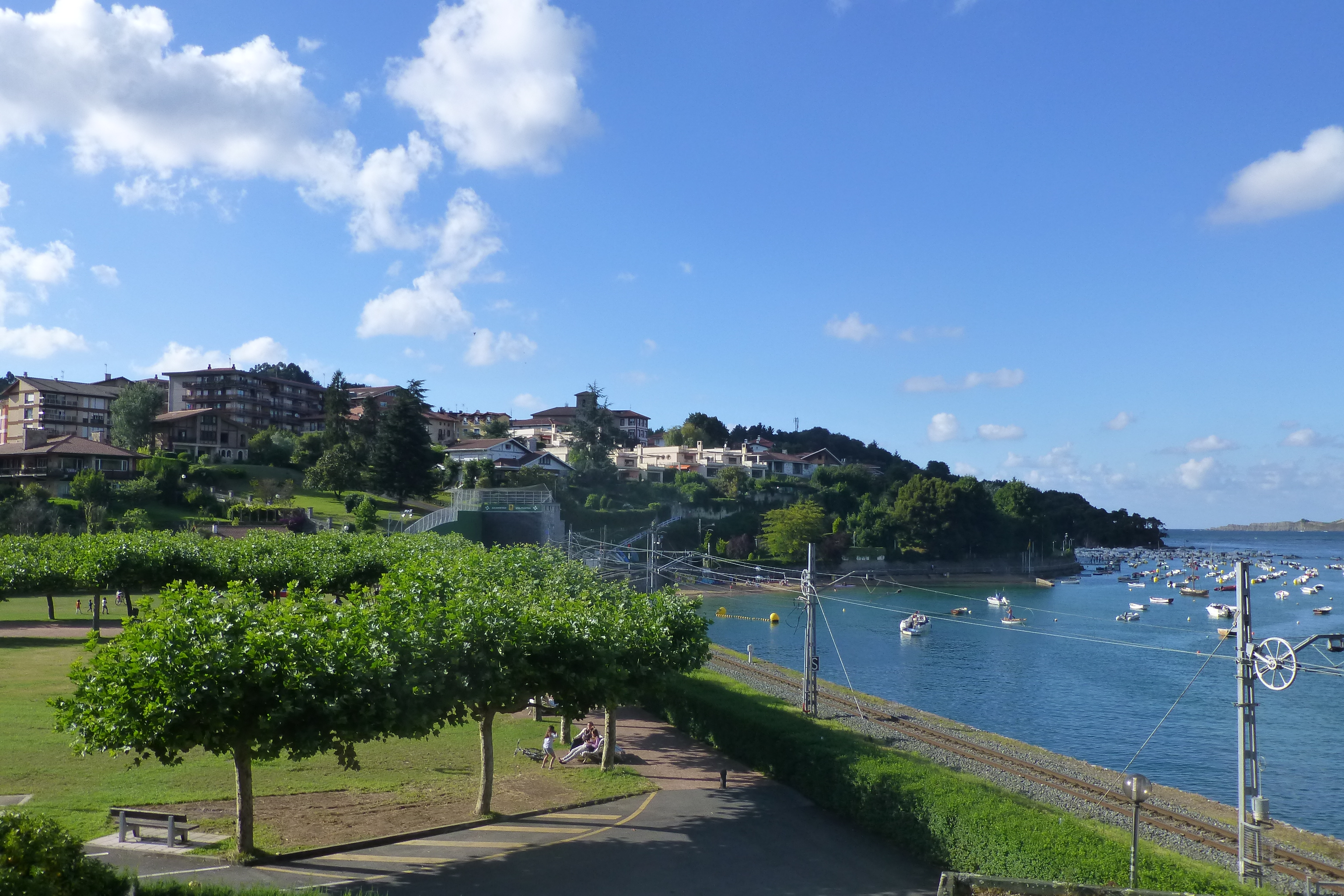

- Coat of arms

- Location of Sukarrieta within the Basque Country Location of Sukarrieta within Spain
- Coordinates: 43°23′40″N 2°41′50″W
- Country: Spain
- Autonomous community: Basque Country
- Province: Biscay
- Comarca: Busturialdea
- Founded: June 15, 1300

Government
  - Mayor: Pedro Sainz-Vizcaya Ortiz de Artiñano (EAJ-PNV)

Area
  - Total: 2.3 km^{2} (0.89 sq mi)
- Elevation: 29 m (95 ft)

Population (2025-01-01)
  - Total: 362
  - Density: 160/km^{2} (410/sq mi)
- Demonym: Basque: sukarrietarra
- Time zone: UTC+1 (CET)
  - Summer (DST): UTC+2 (CEST)
- Postal code: 48395
- Official language(s): Basque; Spanish
- Website: Official website

Sukarrieta (Spanish: Pedernales) is a town and municipality located in the province of Biscay, in the autonomous community of the Basque Country, northern Spain.
