= Murueta =

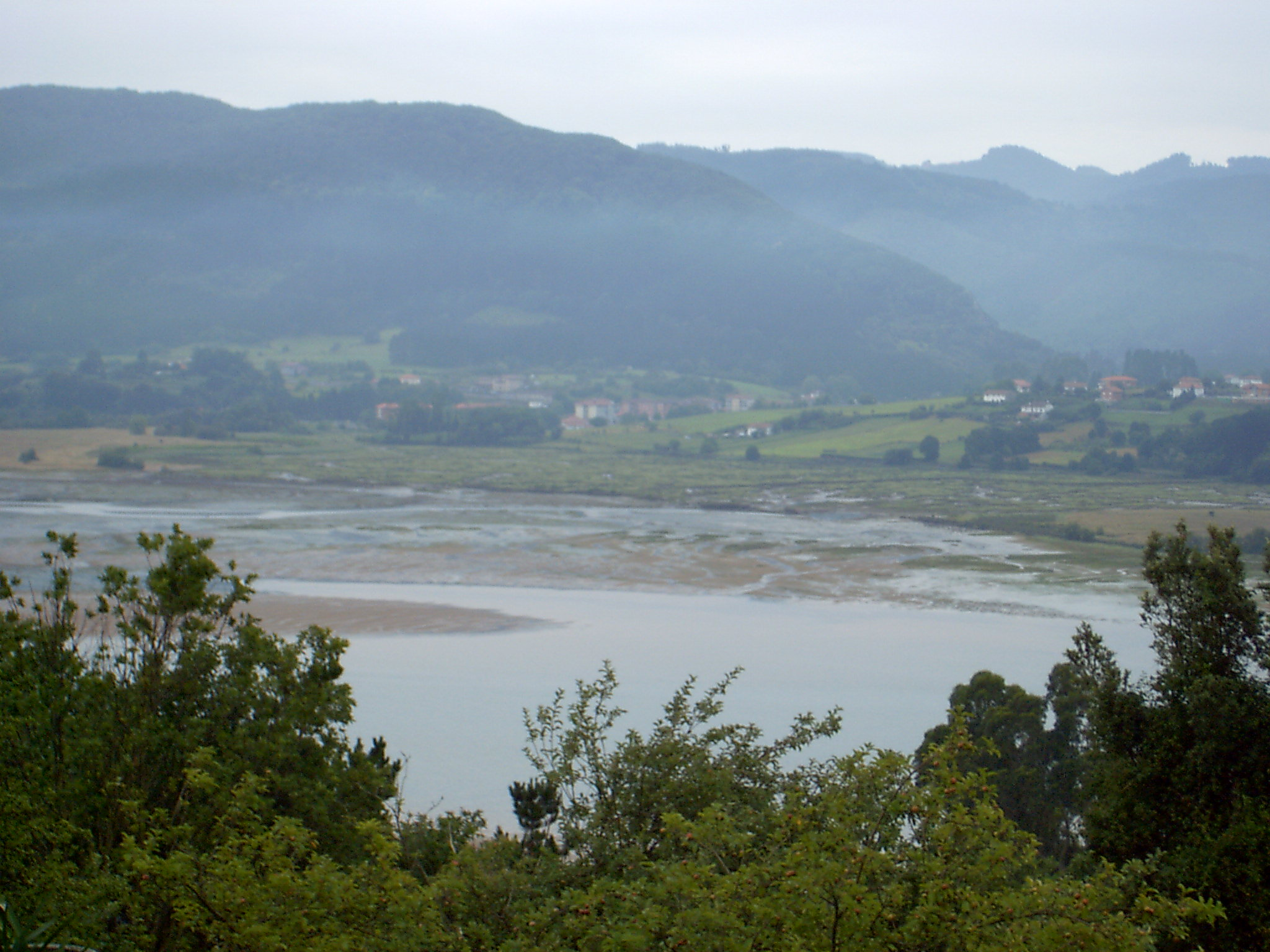

- Flag Coat of arms

- Location of Murueta within the Basque Country Location of Murueta within Spain
- Coordinates: 43°21′9″N 2°40′49″W
- Country: Spain
- Autonomous community: Basque Country
- Province: Biscay
- Comarca: Busturialdea

Government
  - Mayor: Francisco Javier Ondarza Magunagoicoechea

Area
  - Total: 6.1 km^{2} (2.4 sq mi)
- Elevation: 32 m (105 ft)

Population (2025-01-01)
  - Total: 311
  - Density: 51/km^{2} (130/sq mi)
- Time zone: UTC+1 (CET)
  - Summer (DST): UTC+2 (CEST)
- Postal code: 48394
- Website: www.murueta.es

Murueta is a town and municipality located in the province of Biscay, in the autonomous community of Basque Country, northern Spain. According to the 2019 census, it has 308 inhabitants.
