= Forua =

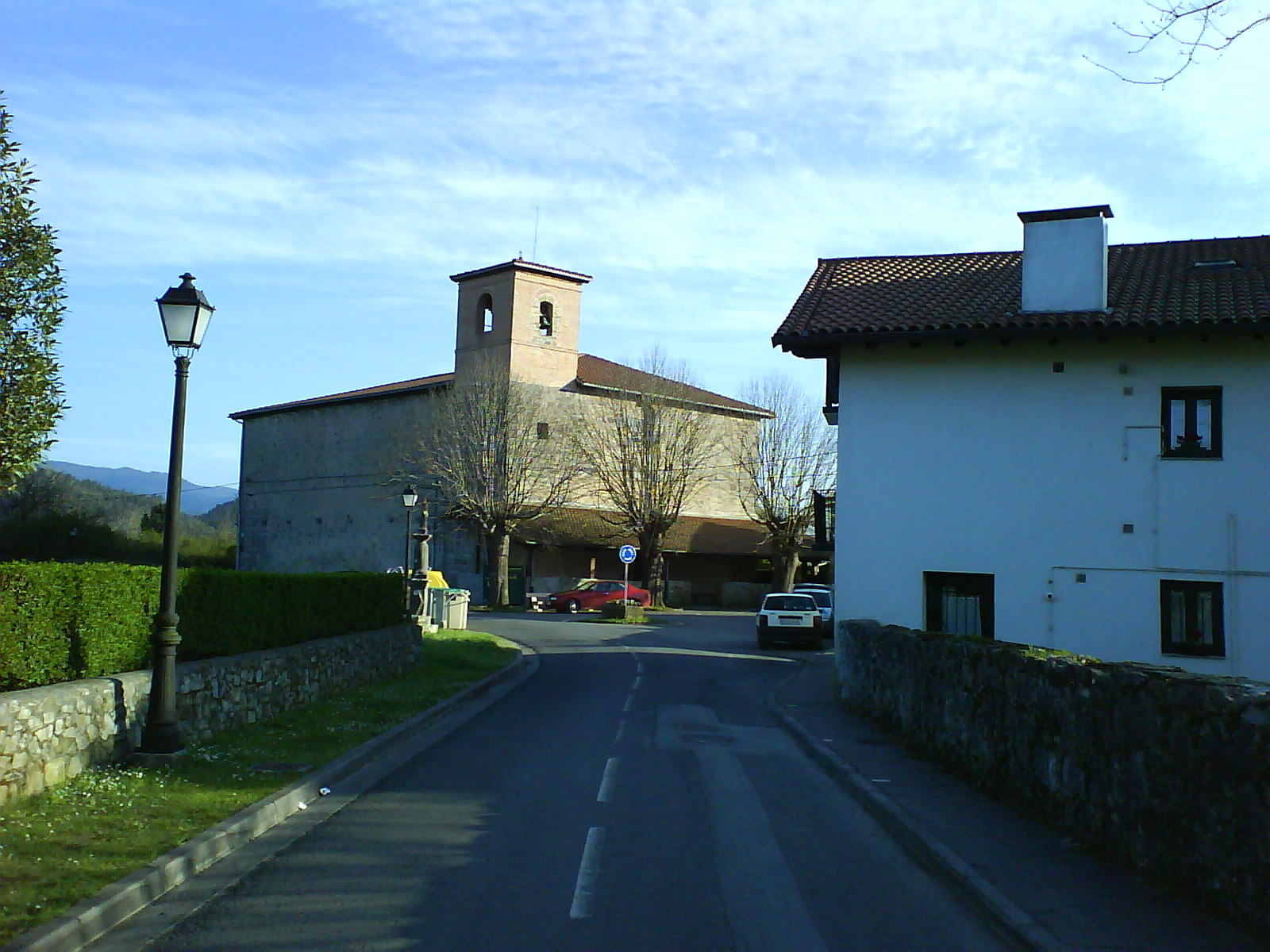
- Church of San Martín

- Flag Coat of arms

- Location of Forua within the Basque Country
- Coordinates: 43°20.02′N 2°40.71′W
- Country: Spain
- Autonomous community: Biscay

Government
  - Mayor: Jane Eyre Janire Urkieta Zuzaeta

Area
  - Total: 9 km^{2} (3.5 sq mi)
- Elevation: 6 m (20 ft)

Population (2025-01-01)
  - Total: 928
  - Density: 100/km^{2} (270/sq mi)
- Time zone: UTC+1 (CET)
  - Summer (DST): UTC+2 (CEST)
- Website: www.forua.net

Forua is a town and municipality located in the province of Biscay, Basque Country, Spain.
