= Mendata =

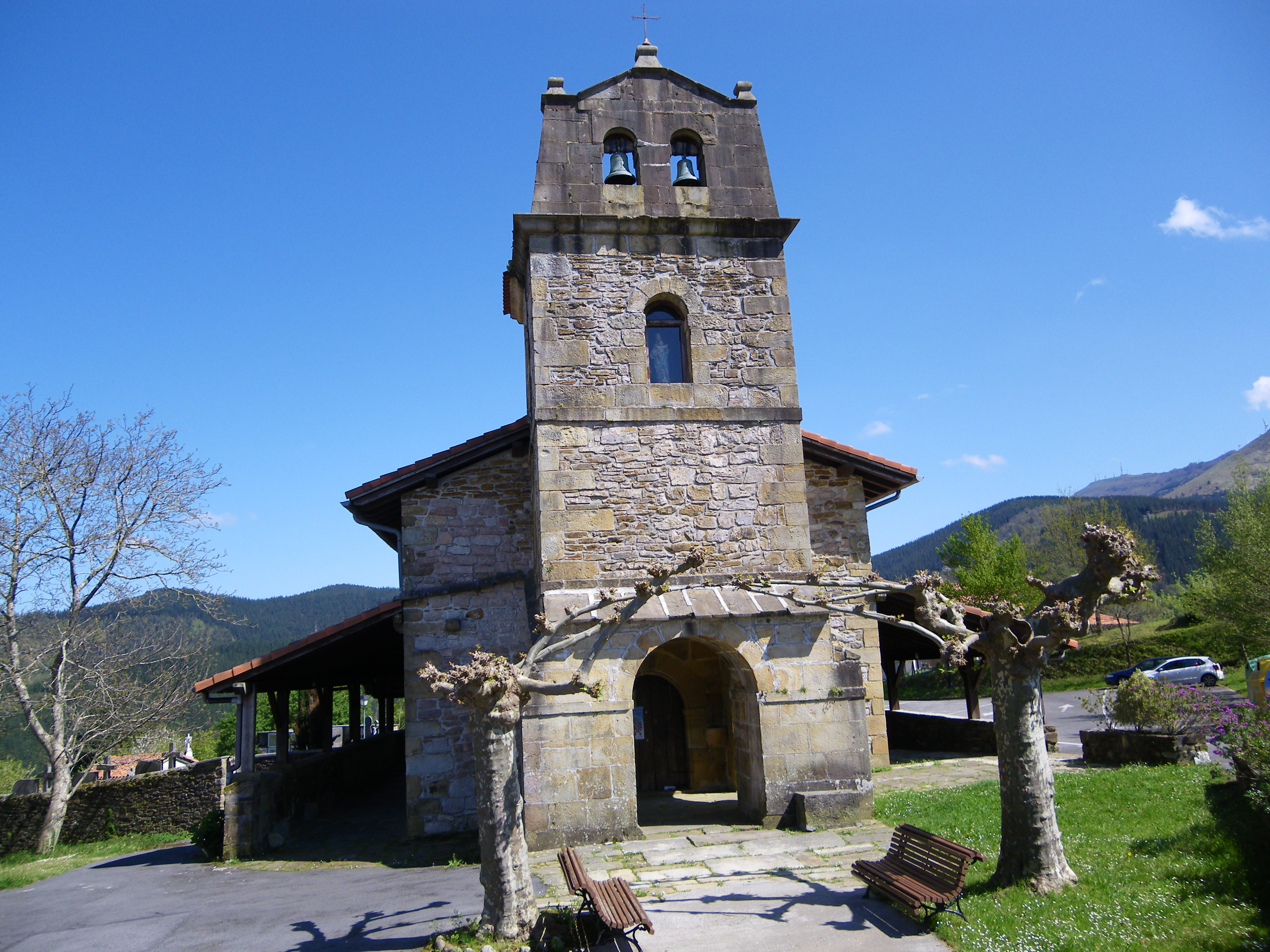

- Flag Coat of arms

- Location of Mendata within the Basque Country Location of Mendata within Spain
- Coordinates: 43°17′56″N 2°38′33″W
- Country: Spain
- Autonomous community: Biscay

Government
  - Mayor: Joseba Mallea Lamikiz

Area
  - Total: 22.39 km^{2} (8.64 sq mi)
- Elevation: 245 m (804 ft)

Population (2025-01-01)
  - Total: 382
  - Density: 17.1/km^{2} (44.2/sq mi)
- Time zone: UTC+1 (CET)
  - Summer (DST): UTC+2 (CEST)
- Website: www.mendata.es

Mendata is a village and municipality located in the province of Biscay, in the autonomous community of Basque Country, northern Spain.
