= Ibarrangelu =

Ibarrangelu Ibarranguelua
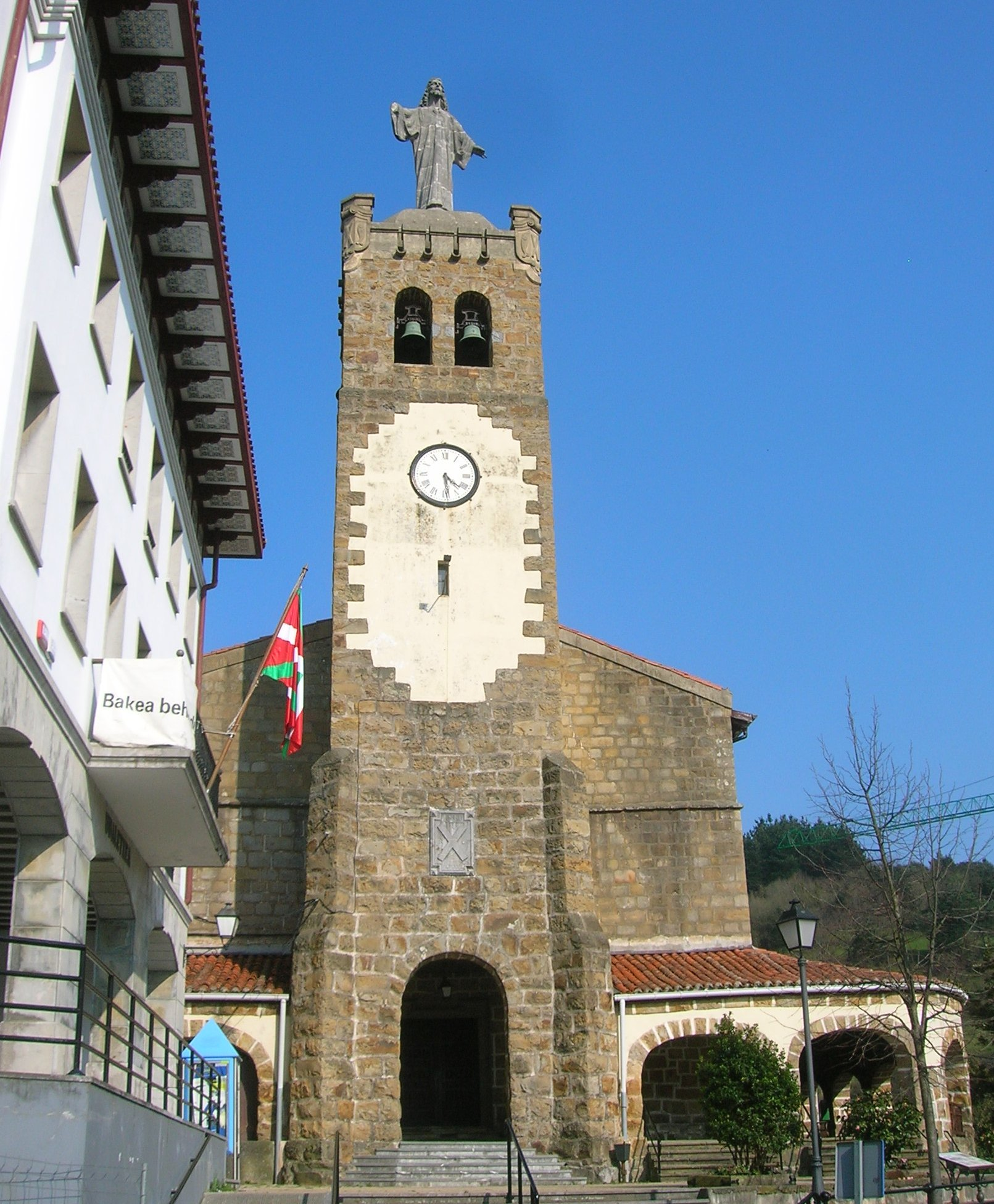
- Town hall of Ibarrangelu

- Flag Coat of arms

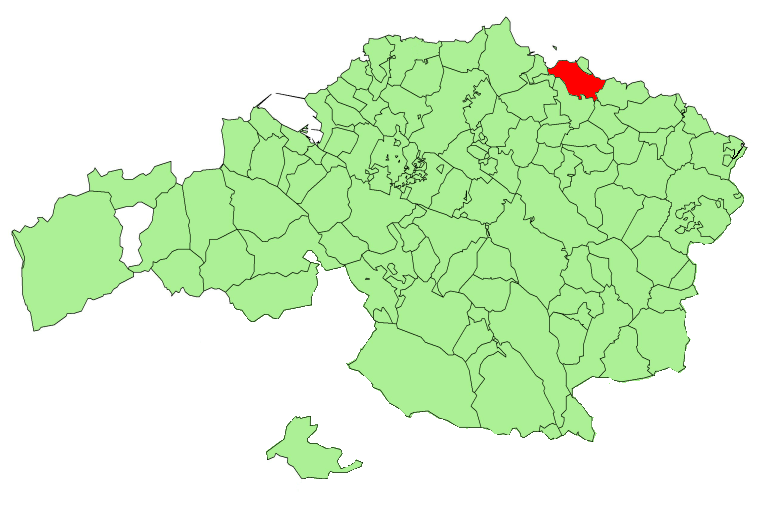
- Location in Biscay

- Location of Ibarrangelu within the Basque Country Location of Ibarrangelu within Spain
- Coordinates: 43°23′23″N 2°37′52″W
- Country: Spain
- Autonomous community: Basque Country
- Province: Biscay
- Comarca: Busturialdea

Government
  - Mayor: Jesus Maria Ziluaga Acebo

Area
  - Total: 15.56 km^{2} (6.01 sq mi)
- Elevation: 100 m (330 ft)

Population (2025-01-01)
  - Total: 669
  - Density: 43.0/km^{2} (111/sq mi)
- Postal code: 48311

Ibarrangelu is a town and municipality located in the province of Biscay, in the autonomous community of Basque Country, northern Spain. According to the 2019 census, it has 632 inhabitants.
