= Izurtza =

- Municipality
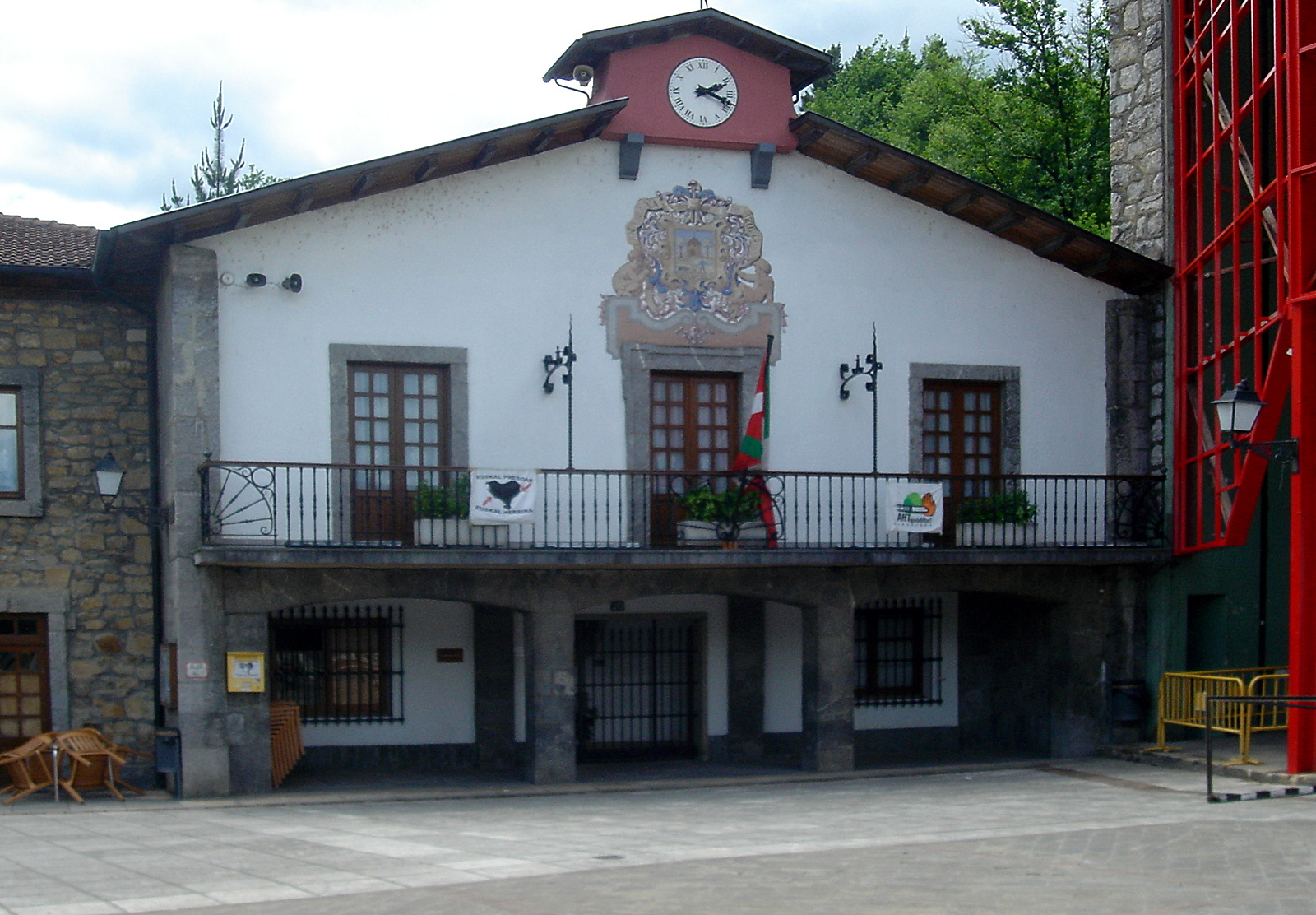
- Izurtza Town Hall

- Coat of arms

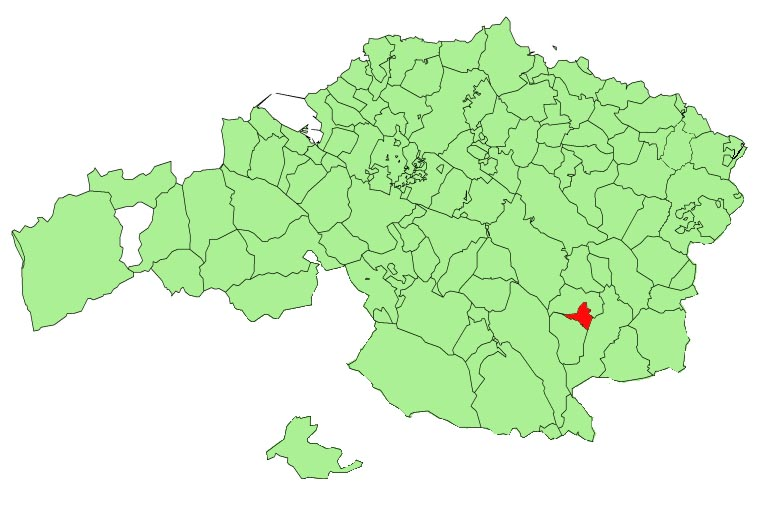
- Location of Izurtza in Biscay.
- Coordinates: 43°09′13″N 1°02′50″E
- Country: Spain
- Autonomous community: País Vasco
- Province: Biscay
- Comarca: Durangaldea
- Established: Not known

Government
  - Mayor: Luis Jose Ballarin Alberdi (Bildu)

Area
  - Total: 4.28 km^{2} (1.65 sq mi)
- Elevation: 148 m (486 ft)

Population (2025-01-01)
  - Total: 224
  - Density: 52.3/km^{2} (136/sq mi)
- Demonym: Izurtzatarra/Izurtzarra
- Time zone: UTC+1 (CET)
  - Summer (DST): UTC+2 (CEST)
- Postal code: 48213
- Dialing code: +34
- Website: http://www.izurtza.net/eu-ES/Orrialdeak/default.aspx

Izurtza (in Basque and officially, in Spanish Izurza) is an elizate, town and municipality located in the province of Biscay, in the Basque Country, Spain. Izurtza is part of the comarca of Durangaldea and has a population of 270 inhabitants as of 2010 and according to the Spanish National Statistics Institute.

== History ==
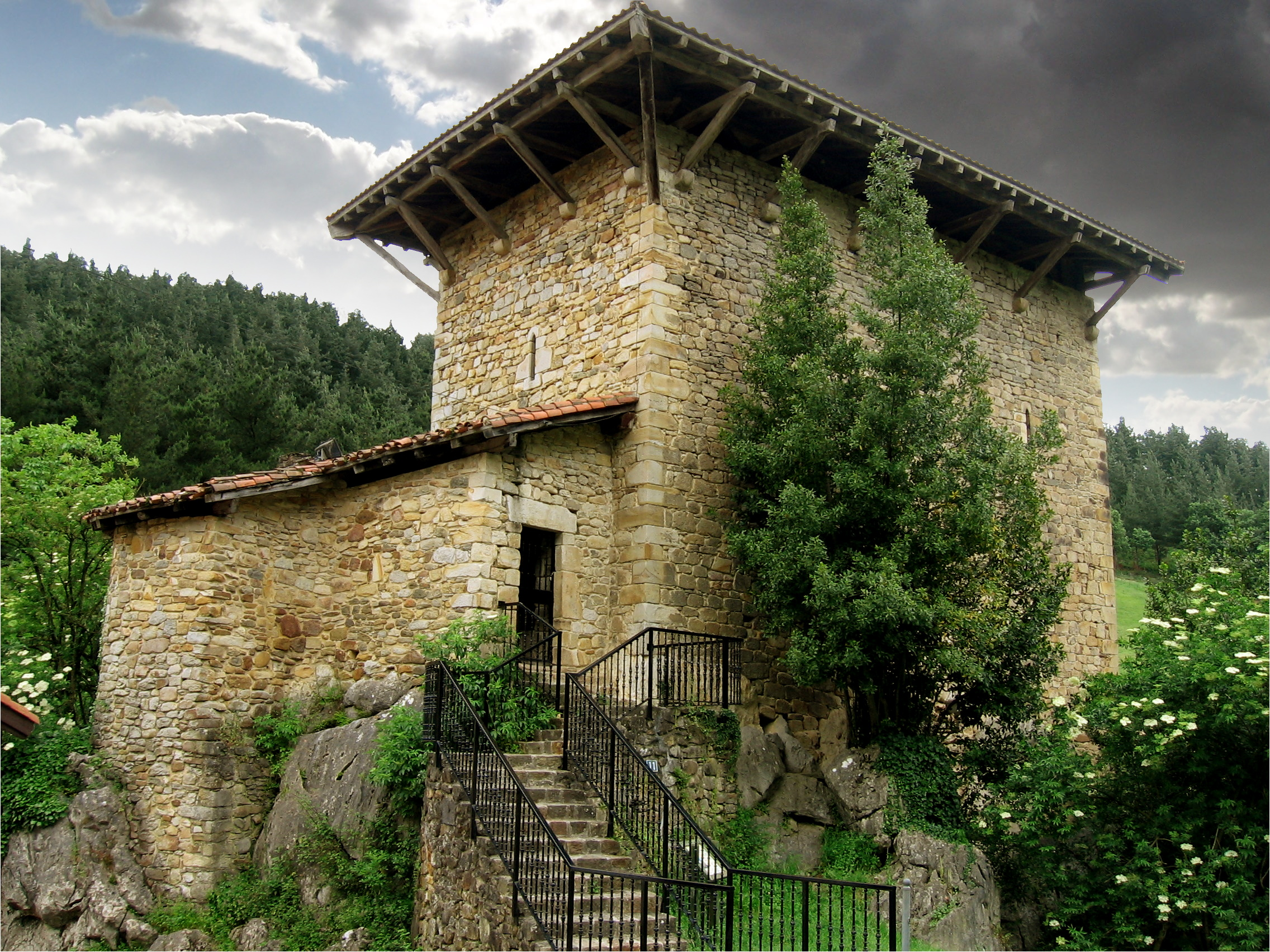
The tower of Etxaburu.

As happens with most of the elizates, the origins and date of foundation of the town are unknown. According to the local tales, the tower of Etxaburu, which is located on a hill above the town, was built following the orders of the Roman Emperor Antoninus Pius. The tower was afterwards destroyed by Henry IV of Castile and built again in the 16th century by Sancho López de Ibargüen. Also on this century the church of the town, named San Nicolás Obispo was built. Izurtza was part of the merindad of Durango, and it had voice and right to vote in the Juntas of Guerendiaga, where it occupied the seat number eleven.

== Geography ==
=== Location ===
Izurtza is located in the southeastern part of the province of Biscay, northern Spain. It is one of the smallest municipalities of the province by extension. It limits at north and west with Durango, at south with Mañaria and at east with Abadiño.

Izurtza is situated between the Mugarra and Untxillaitz mountains and the Mañaria River runs through it. The road BI-623 that connects Durango with Vitoria-Gasteiz crosses the town from north to south. Izurtza is made by a small urban core surrounding the BI-623 road and farming houses scattered through the hillsides.

=== Hydrography ===
Izurtza is located in a valley formed by the Mañaria river that originates in the hillsides of the mountains and later joins the Ibaizabal river.

== Economy ==
Historically, the economy of the municipality has been linked to the farming exploitations. Since the 20th century, the industrial expansion has caused the primary sector to lose its range as the main economical activity.

== Transportation ==
The transportation is based on road transportation by the BI-623 road, which connects the town with Durango, the capital city of the comarca of Durangaldea and only 1,5 km away. The same road by south connects the town with Mañaria and Urkiola and from there to Otxandio, Dima and the province of Álava. In Durango, the road is connected to the National Road N-634 and the highway AP-8 to Bilbao and Donostia-San Sebastián.

== See also ==
- Mañaria
- Durango, Biscay
- Durangaldea
