= Mañaria =

Coordinates: 43°8.24′N 2°39.66′W

- Municipality
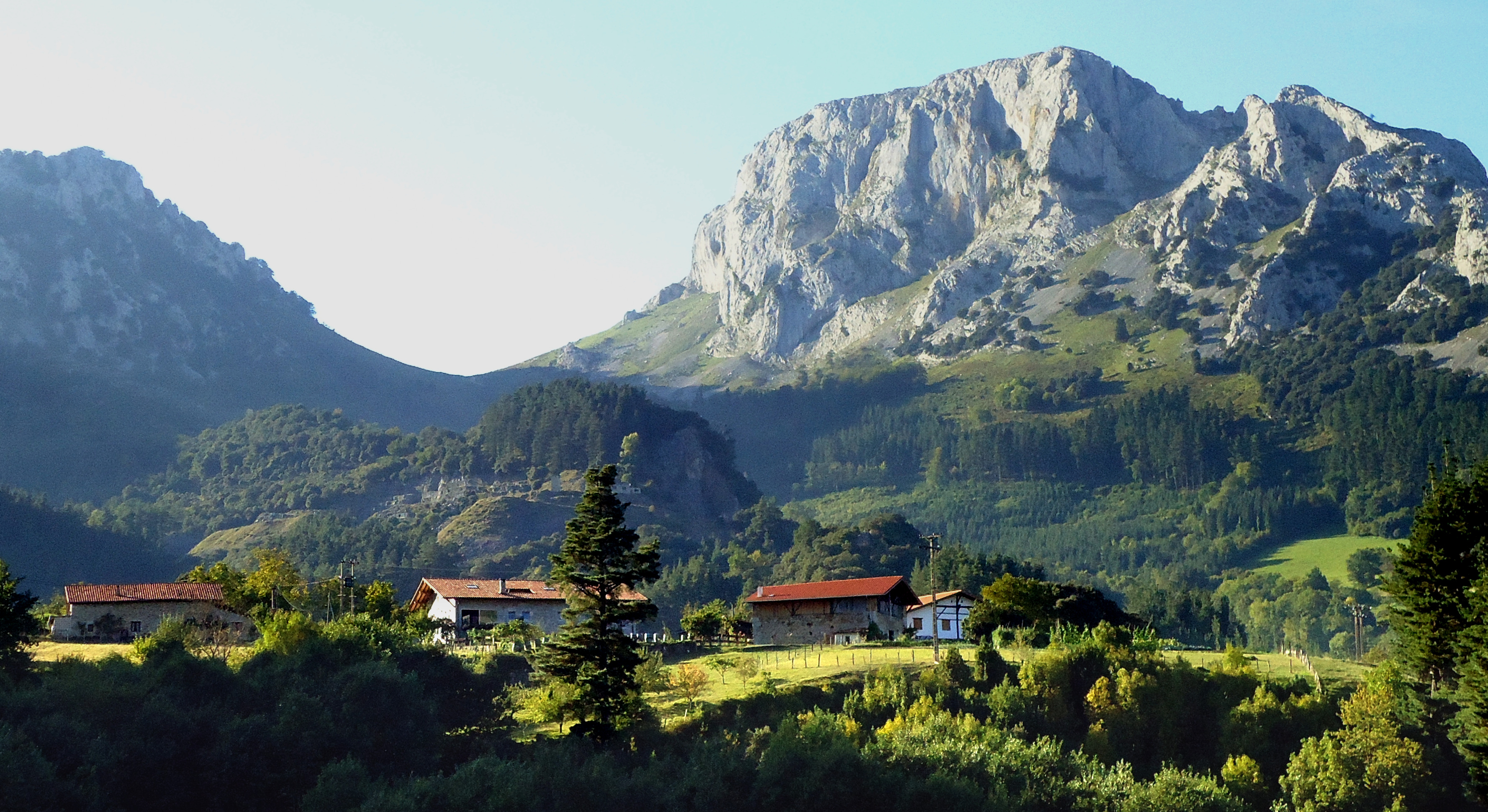

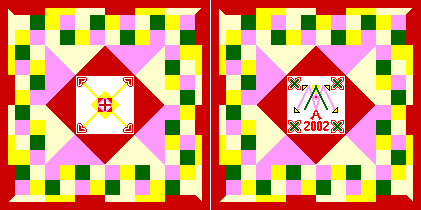
- Flag Coat of arms

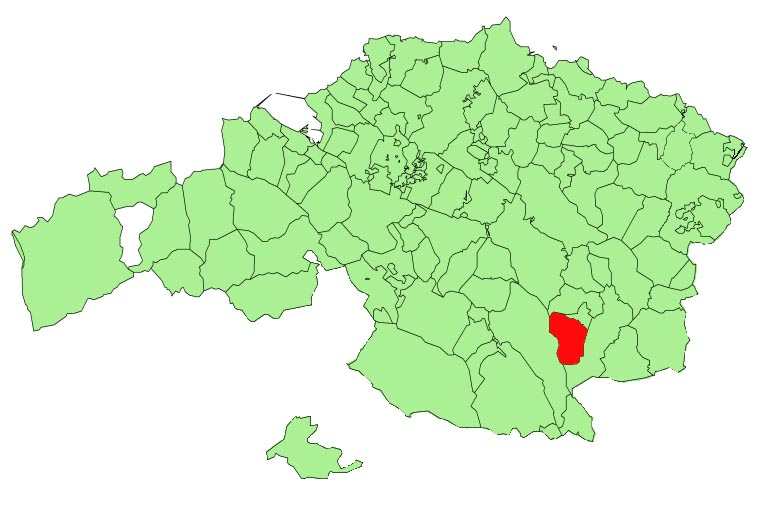
- Location of Mañaria in Biscay.
- Country: Spain
- Autonomous community: País Vasco
- Province: Biscay
- Comarca: Durangaldea
- Established: Not known

Government
  - Mayor: Endika Jayo Bilbao (Bildu)

Area
  - Total: 17.73 km^{2} (6.85 sq mi)
- Elevation: 259 m (850 ft)

Population (2025-01-01)
  - Total: 539
  - Density: 30.4/km^{2} (78.7/sq mi)
- Demonym: Mañaritarra
- Time zone: UTC+1 (CET)
  - Summer (DST): UTC+2 (CEST)
- Postal code: 48212
- Website: Official website

Mañaria (both in Basque and Spanish) is an elizate, town and municipality located in the province of Biscay, in the Basque Country, Spain. Mañaria is part of the comarca of Durangaldea and has a population of 459 inhabitants as of 2006 according to the Spanish National Statistics Institute.

== History ==
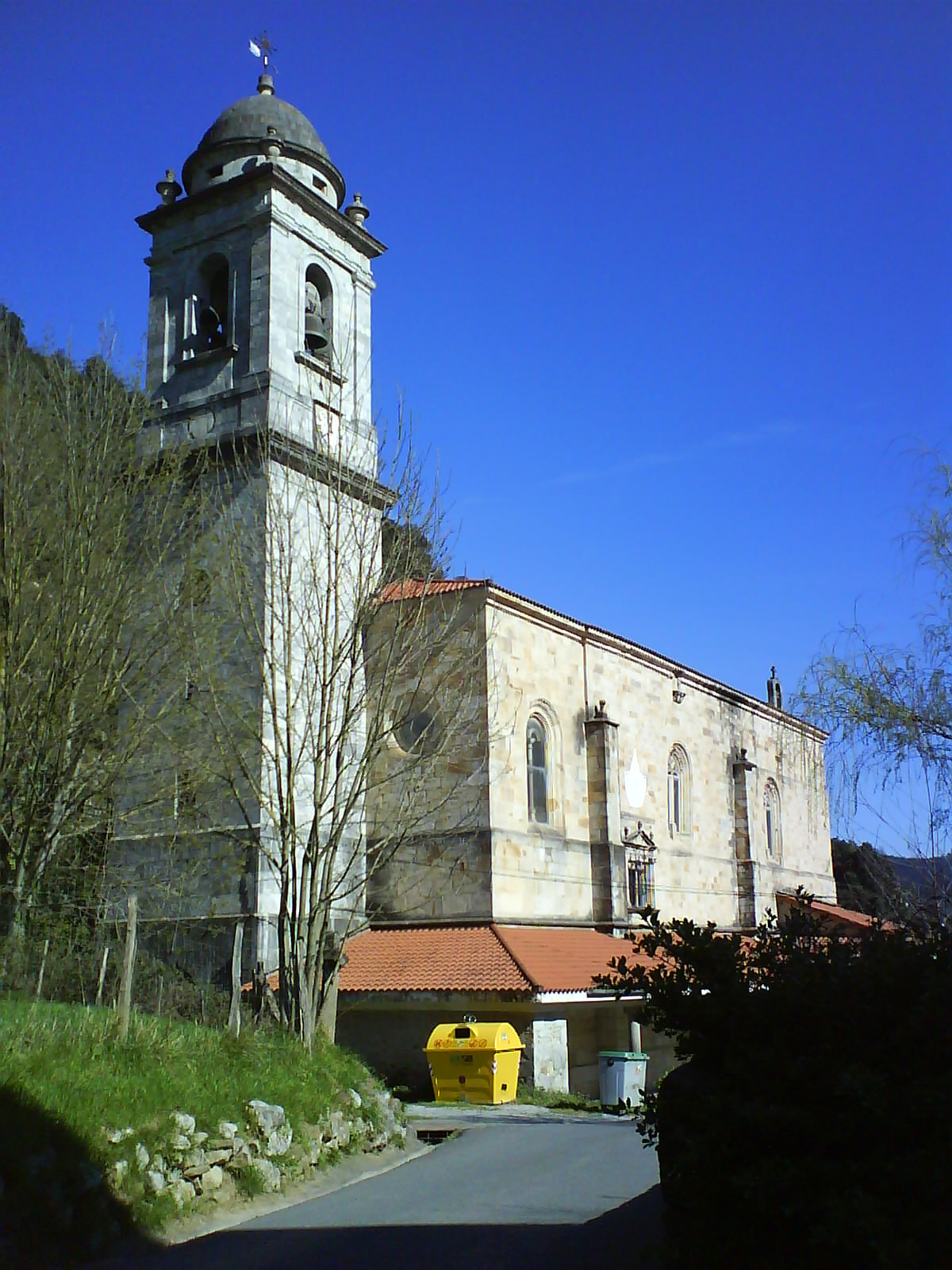
The church of Mañaria, Santa María.

As happens with most of the elizates, little is known about the early history of the town and its foundation. Prehistoric deposits of Magdalenian and Neolithic origin have been found in the caves of Silibranka, Kobazar and Atxuri, among others. A Visigoth liturgical vase of the 7th Century has also been found.

Mañaria was part of the merindad of Durango, and it had voice and right to vote in the Juntas of Guerendiaga, where it occupied the seat number four. On the 18th Century the construction of the Royal Road connecting the city of Vitoria with the coast of Biscay going through Urkiola meant the realignment of the town's location, making it the central axis of the municipality. Since mid 18th Century and during the entire 19th Century, Mañaria lived a period of splendor because of the exploitation of its quarries. The church is extended, and the school, the Basque pelota fronton, the tower of the clock and the cemetery are built.

== Geography ==
=== Location ===
Mañaria is located in the southeastern part of the province of Biscay, which is located in northern Spain. It limits at north with the municipalities of Izurtza and Durango, at west with Dima and at east and south with Abadiño.

Mañaria is situated on a valley within the course of the Mañaria River and surrounded by mountains; the Mugarra and Untxillaitz the most significant ones. Other important mountains that surround the municipality are the Arrietabaso and Saibi. The road BI-623 that connects Durango with Vitoria-Gasteiz crosses the city from north to south before ascending to Urkiola. More than 70% of the territory of the municipality is part of the Urkiola Natural Park.

=== Hydrography ===
The valley is formed by the Mañaria River that originates in the hillsides of the mountains that surround it. This river later joins the Ibaizabal river.

== Economy ==
The economy of the municipality is based on mining and industry.

=== Primary Sector ===
The primary sector is based on the exploitation of resources as limestone and marble in quarries, being this the main economical activity of the municipality. Some small farming activities are also present.

=== Secondary Sector ===
The secondary sector is based on the metallurgical transformation. Most of the industries are located in the deeper area of the valley.

=== Tertiary Sector ===
It is almost non-existent due to the proximity of bigger cities, as Durango or Bilbao, where most of the services are located.

== Transportation ==
The transportation is based on road transportation by the BI-623 road, which connects the town with Durango, the capital city of the comarca of Durangaldea and 5 km away. The same road by south connects the town with Urkiola and from there to Otxandio, Dima and the province of Álava. In Durango, the road is connected to the National Road N-634 and the highway AP-8 to Bilbao and Donostia-San Sebastián.

== See also ==
- Durango, Biscay
- Durangaldea
