= Mugarra =

Mountain in Spain

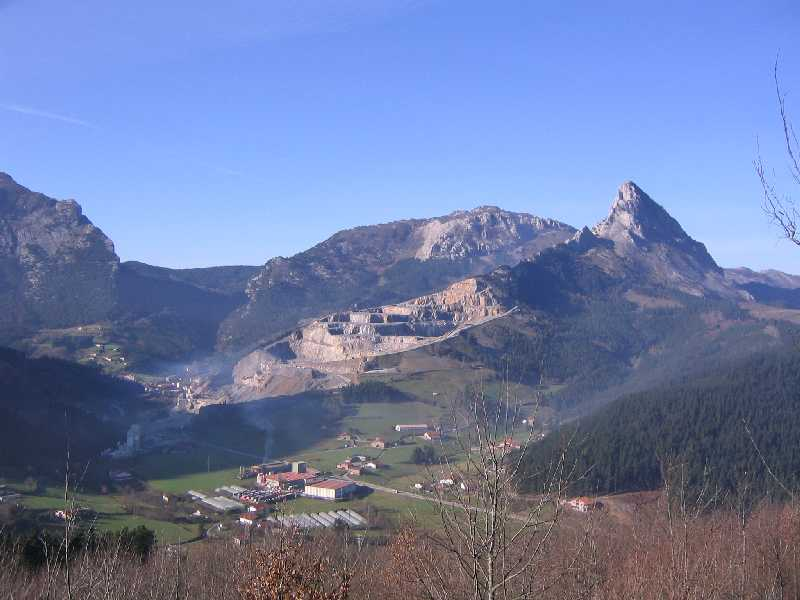
- Mugarra from the east. The quarry is clearly seen.

Highest point
- Elevation: 936 m (3,071 ft)
- Prominence: 195 m (640 ft)
- Coordinates: 43°09′9.13″N 02°40′46.19″W

Naming
- Language of name: Basque

Geography
- Location within Spain
- Location: Biscay, Spain
- Parent range: Basque Mountains

Climbing
- Easiest route: From Mañaria and the col of Mugarrekolanda.

Mugarra is a peak of Biscay, Basque Country (Spain), 936 m high, belonging to the Aramotz massif.

The Aramotz massif is in the western limit of the Urkiola range. Mugarra continues the line of the Anboto, Alluitz, Aitz Txiki and Untxillaitz and is the eastern limit of the Aramotz massif.

Huge limestone rock where fossil rests of seashell can be found. The southern face forms a 300 m high cliff over the col of Mugarrekolanda. In this cliff have their nests the majority of the vulture pairs of Urkiola (60 estimated). The northern face, facing Durango, is very steep but does not form a cliff, and it is covered by beeches and Cantabrian Holm Oaks.

The crest of Mugarra has many rock climbing ways, but climbing is not permitted to avoid disrupting of the vultures' habitat. This limestone crest is being consumed by a great quarry that causes irreparable damage to the mountain and is bordering the protected area.

== Ascents ==
In Mañaria (181 m), a good path reaches the Mugarrekolanda (760 m) col. From the col an easy route leads to the summit from the west. It is possible from there to access the eastern part of the crest through the break of Atxurkulu (662 m). The ascent takes 2h.

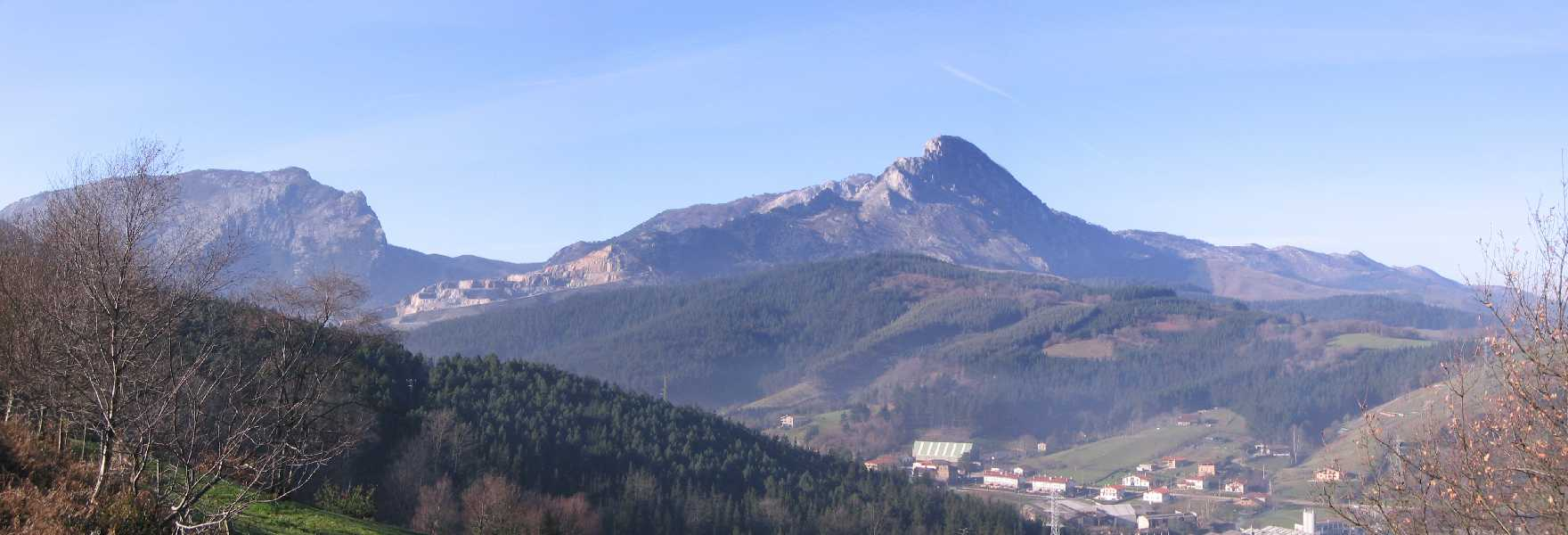
General view of Mugarra, to the left Arrietabaso (1,010 m). The town at the bottom is Izurza

.

- Source: Mendikat
