= José Félix Gallastegi =

Spanish footballer and manager

Personal information
- Full name: José Félix Gallastegi Bilbao
- Date of birth: 7 July 1966 (age 60)
- Place of birth: Abadiño, Spain
- Height: 1.74 m (5 ft 9 in)
- Position: Midfielder

Youth career
- Amorebieta

Senior career*
Years	Team	Apps	(Gls)
- Abadiño
1987–1989	Lemona	75	(4)
1989–1990	Eibar	23	(1)
1990–1994	Sestao	111	(4)
1994–1995	Murcia	30	(0)
1997–2002	Amorebieta		
Total		238	(9)

Managerial career
- 2002–2006: Amorebieta (youth)
- 2006–2009: Arratia
- 2010–2013: Ermua
- 2013–2015: Amorebieta (youth)
- 2015: Amorebieta
- * Club domestic league appearances and goals

José Félix Gallastegi Bilbao (born 7 July 1966) is a Spanish retired football manager and former player who played as a midfielder. He is the current kit manager of Bilbao Athletic.

Gallastegi appeared in nearly 100 Segunda División matches for SD Eibar and Sestao Sport Club, scoring four goals. As a manager, he was notably in charge of SD Amorebieta in Segunda División B.
