= Urquiola =

Urquiola is the traditional Spanish spelling of a Basque placename that currently uses to be spelt Urkiola, following modern Basque spelling.

== Places ==
- Urkiola mountain range of the Basque mountains in Biscay near Durango, in the western Basque Country, Spain.
  - Urkiola Natural Park, protected area located in the South East of Biscay and in the North of Álava in the Basque Country, Spain.
  - Sanctuary of Urkiola (Sanctuary of Saint Anthony the Abbot and Saint Anthony of Padua of Urkiola), Catholic temple complex located in the hill and port of Urkiola, in the Biscayan municipality of Abadiño.
  - River Urkiola, river that has its source in the Biscayne part of the Park and flows to Álava. It's a tributary of the Zadorra, which itself is tributary of the Ebro.

== Notable people with the surname ==
- Isabel de Urquiola (1854–1911), Spanish explorer
- Patricia Urquiola (born 1961), Spanish architect

== Ships ==
- Urquiola, oil tanker which caused the Urquiola oil spill in Galicia in 1979.

== See also ==
- Ulquiorra
