= Aitz Txiki =

Mountain in Spain

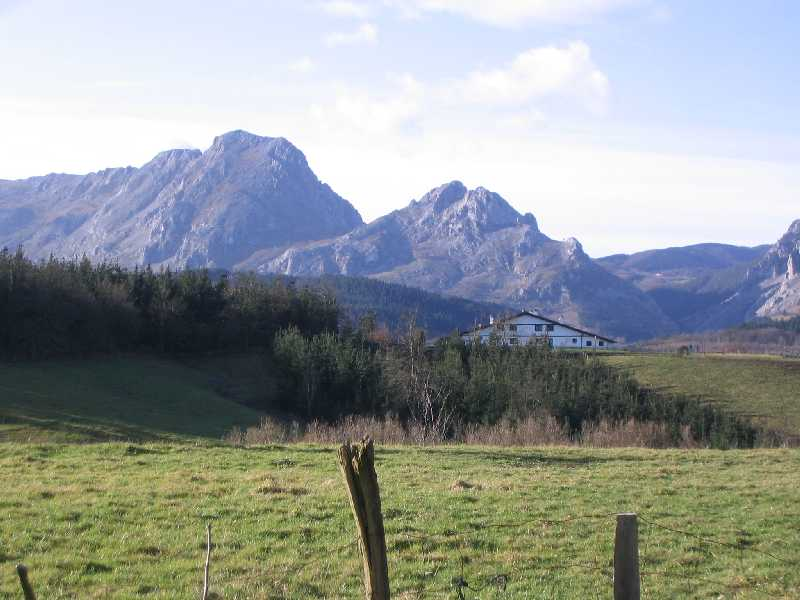
- Aitz Txiki seen from the north, beside Alluitz.

Highest point
- Elevation: 791 m (2,595 ft)
- Prominence: 91 m (299 ft)
- Coordinates: 43°07′06.68″N 02°37′40.54″W

Naming
- Language of name: Basque

Geography
- Location: Biscay, Spain
- Parent range: Basque Mountains

Climbing
- Easiest route: From Atxarte 290 metres (951 ft)

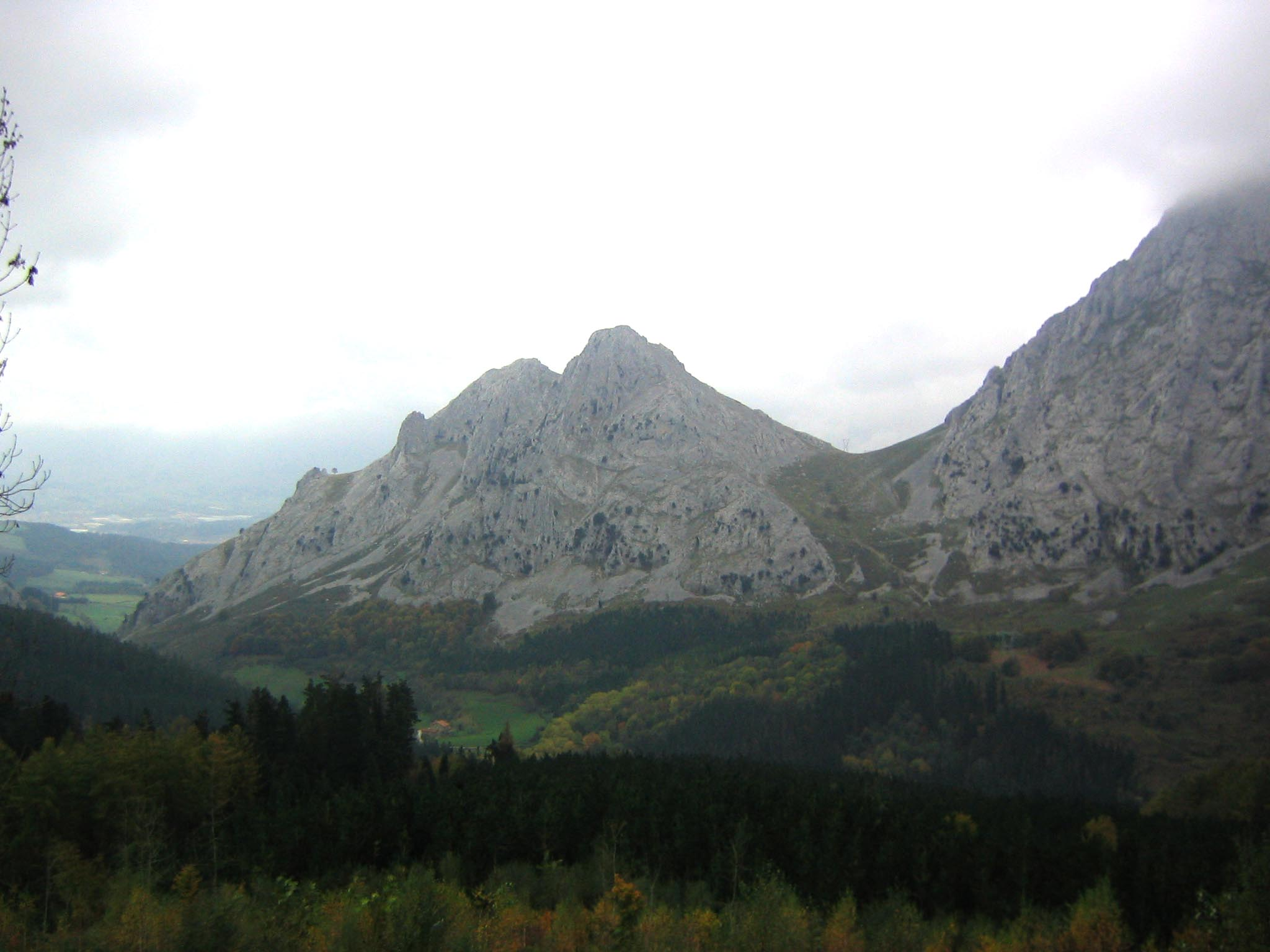
Aitz Txiki south face, beside Alluitz (to the right, covered bt fog, separated by Artola col).

Aitz Txiki is a peak of Biscay, Basque Country (Spain) and is 791 m high. It has a prominence of 153 m. Its name means "small rock" (aitz=rock txiki=small).

== Description ==
It is the smallest peak of the Urkiola range, and forms part of the same limestone mass that forms the Anboto and the Alluitz.

Although it is the smallest one, it has the same rough and wild look, especially when viewed from the Atxarte pass that separates the mountain from the neighbouring Untxillaitz. It has a double summit- the highest is Aitz Txiki and the lowest one is Artxua or Sorginkobetagana. It is rough and difficult from all sides except the one faced to Atxarte, which is the main access route. There are remains of a castle that was used to watch the Atxarte pass.

The main rock climbing ways of Biscay's climbing school are in its slopes.

== Ascents ==
From Atxarte (1h 30m): from the Zelaieta parish of Abadiano goes the road to Mendiola until the Atxarte pass, then the river is crossed and the route reaches the col of Asuntze soon left to reach the col of Artola. From there the proper ascent to Aitz Txiki begins without major difficulties through steep meadows.

From Axpe (1h 30m): the path goes just under the Devil's Pass, from here the Alluitz can be seen. A path to the right leads to the col of Artola from where the route of Atxarte continues.
