= Untxillaitz =

Mountain in Spain

Untxillatx
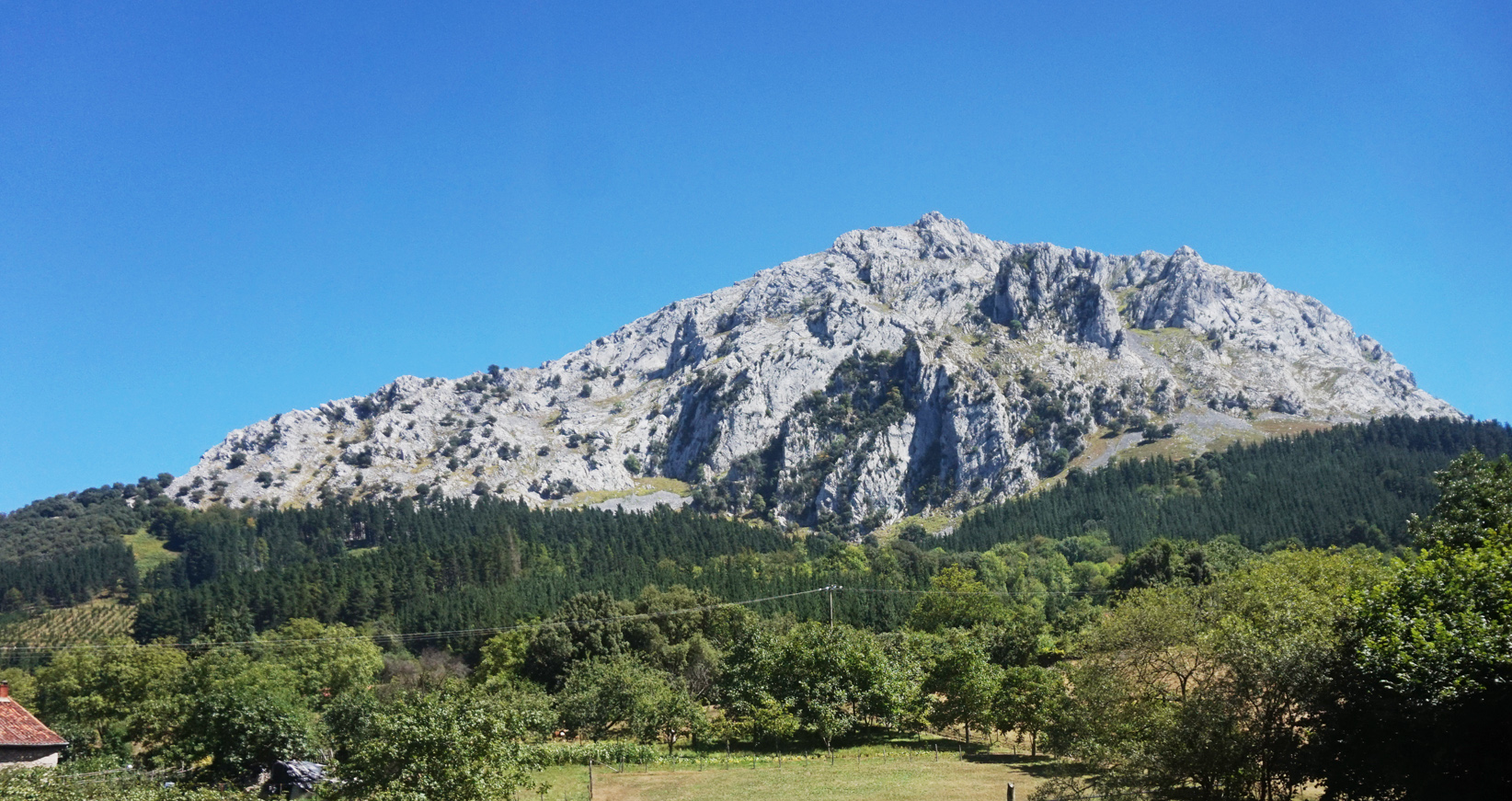
- Mount Untxillatx

Highest point
- Elevation: 934 m (3,064 ft)
- Prominence: 375 m (1,230 ft)
- Coordinates: 43°07′43.82″N 02°38′38.29″W

Naming
- Language of name: Basque

Geography
- Location within Spain
- Location: Biscay, Spain
- Parent range: Basque Mountains

Climbing
- Easiest route: From Mañaria and the col of Oraieta.

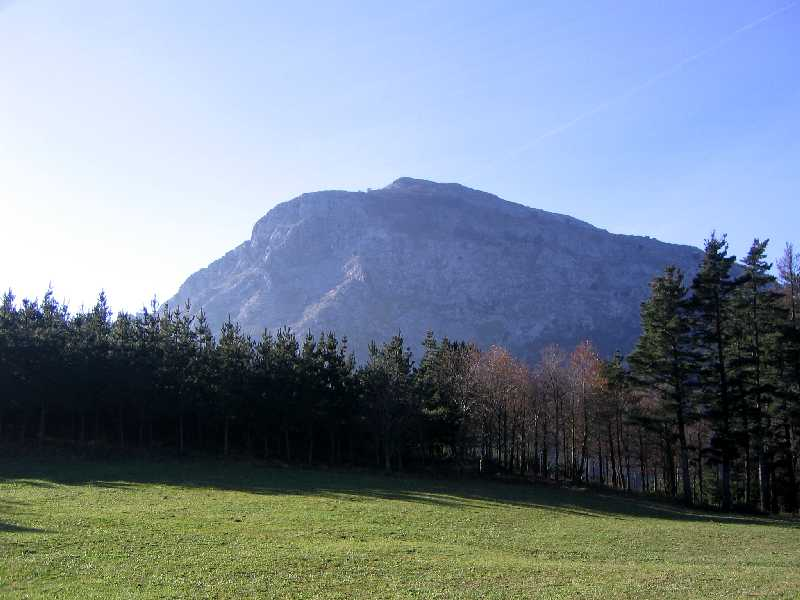
Untzillaitz.

Untxillaitz, Untxillaitx, or Untzillatx, is a mountain of Biscay, Basque Country (Spain), 934 m. high. Its name may mean "Rabbit's peak" (in Basque language : untzi(a)=rabbit, and aitz=peak).

Part of the Urkiola range, although it does not belong to the same crest of the Anboto, it is also part of the same limestone range.

It forms the pass of Atxarte with the neighbouring Aitz Txiki and it is located in the valleys of Mendiola and Mañaria. Quarries have been created in both sides of the mountain, but now the Atxarte one is closed. Mañaria is the starting point of the Urkiola pass that separates Untxillatx from Mugarra.

An outstanding feature is the rock prominence in the north face, called Urresti. This prominence has many rock climbing ways and vulture nests.

== Climbing routes ==
From Atxarte.(1h 30m) From the neighbourhood of Zelaieta in Abadiano the road goes to the Atxarte pass there the river is crossed and a path turns to the right and there is a steep ascension beside the Urresti prominence. At the top of Urresti there is a difficult rock climb that leads to the Elosua col route. At the end of the prominence, the crest is followed until the summit.

From Mañaria by Elosua.(2h) From the quarry at this side of the mountain, there is a path that leads to the col of Elosua, from where the summit is reached following the crest.
