= Oiz =

Mountain summit in Biscay, Basque Country, Spain

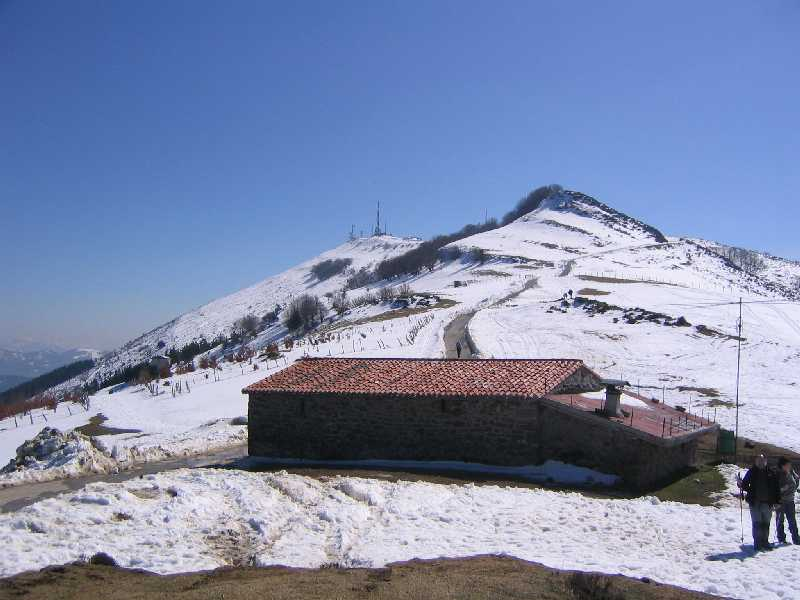
- Mount Oiz summit.

Highest point
- Elevation: 1,026 m (3,366 ft)
- Prominence: 710 m (2,330 ft)
- Coordinates: 43°13′43.21″N 02°35′24.13″W

Naming
- Native name: Oiz (Basque)

Geography
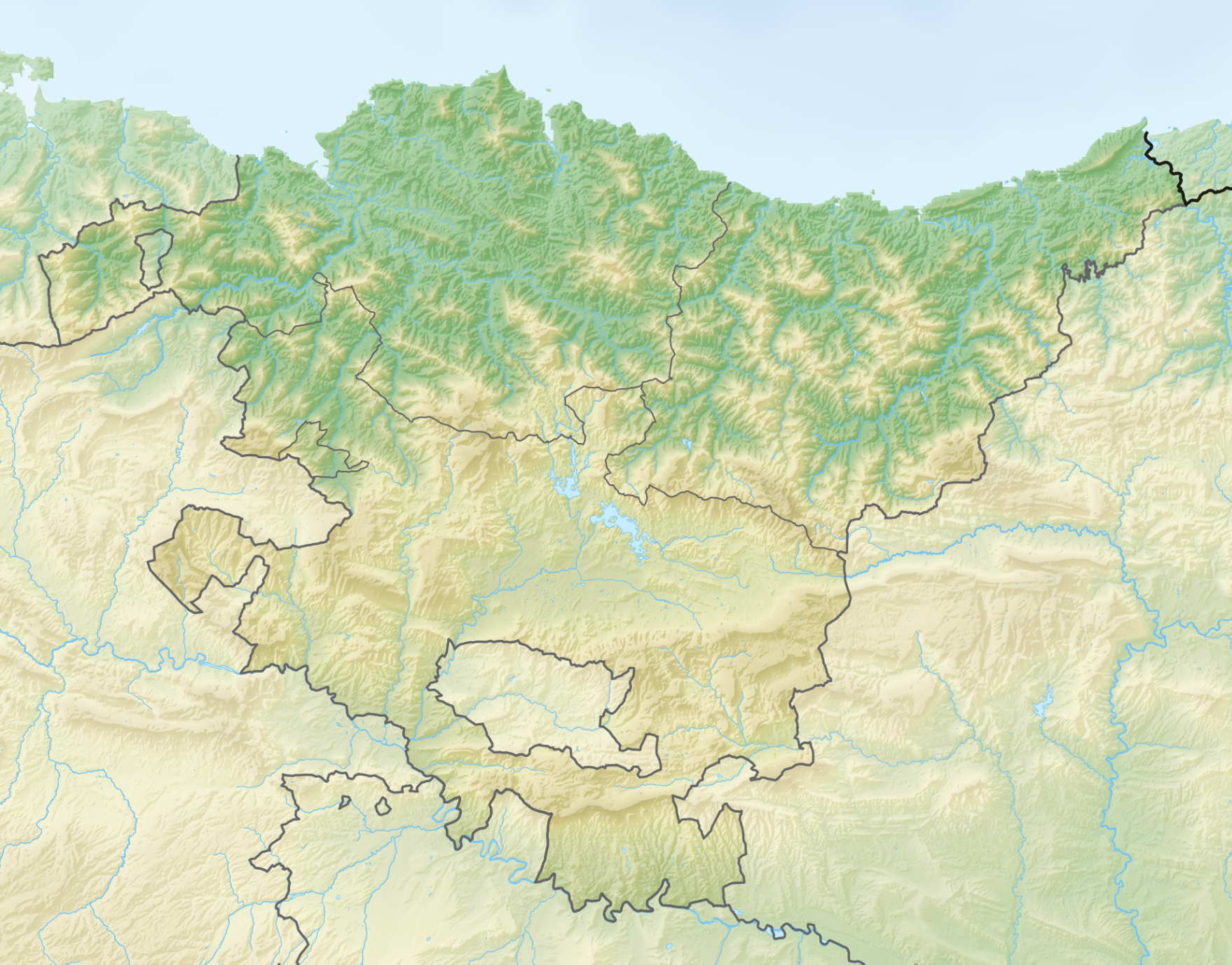
- Location within the Basque Country Location within Spain
- Location: Biscay, Spain
- Parent range: Basque Mountains

Climbing
- Easiest route: South face from Garai.

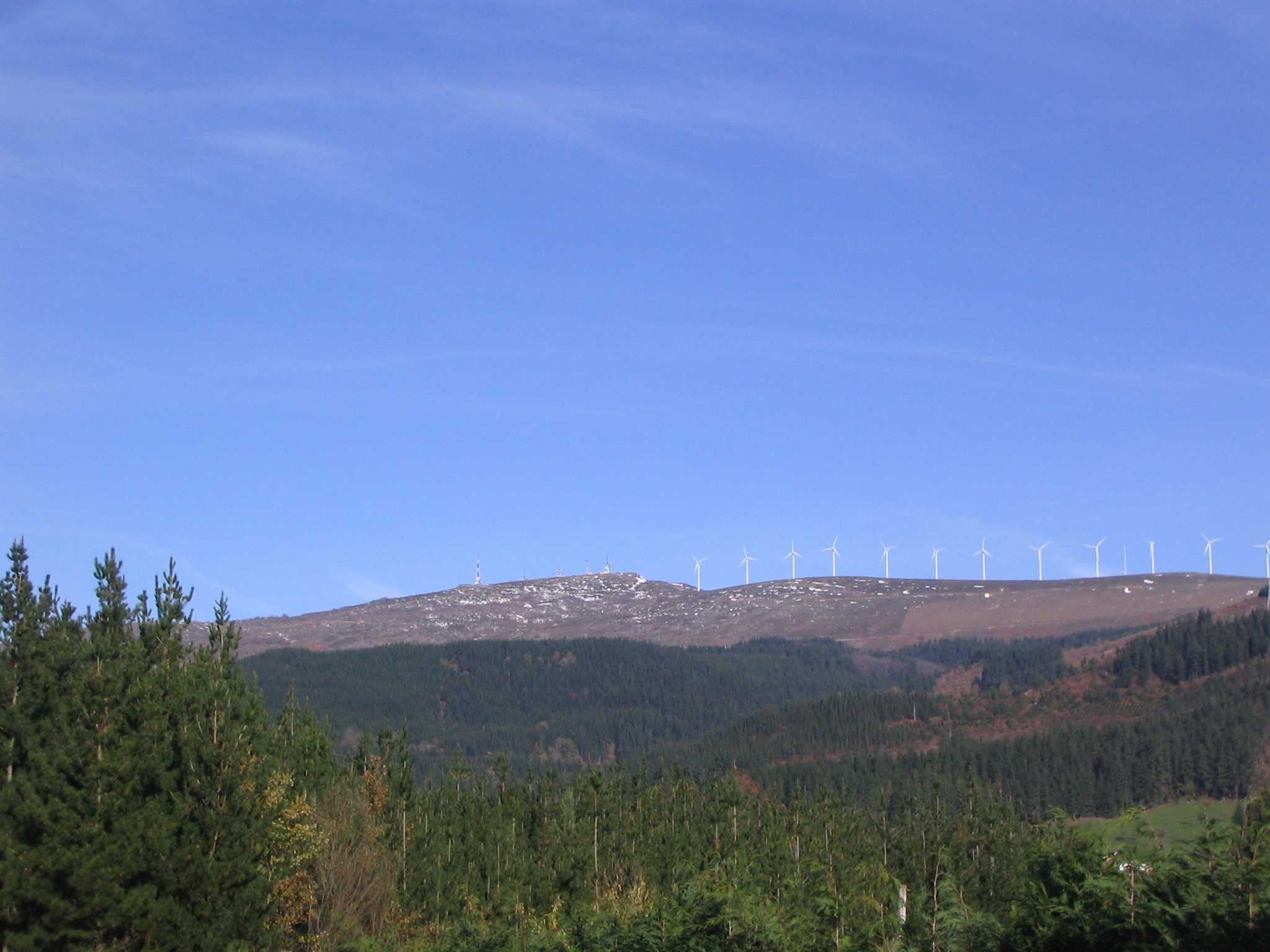
Oiz, southern face.

Mount Oiz (1026.40 m), is one of the most popular summits of Biscay in the Basque Country (Spain). Its summits form part of a long range that feeds several rivers: Ibaizabal, Artibai, Lea, Oka and Deba in Gipuzkoa all of them running to the Bay of Biscay.

== Description ==
The mountain is clearly distinguished from its surroundings, mostly because of the large antenna and the wind turbines on the top.

Its location in the middle of the province and its height provides great views from the summit, from the nearby sea to the surrounding mountains.

There are still patches of oaks and beeches on the mountain, but the higher zones are covered by huge pastures where sheep, horses, and cows graze. There are wild deer and boars. Birds fly freely between Oiz and the nearby Urkiola natural park.

== History and legend ==
Oiz is one of the most important places of the history of Biscay and the Basque Country. During prehistory it was inhabited by shepherds that left an important legacy of megalithic monuments. Later they moved to the valleys where they left the necropolis of San Juan de Momoitio.

Oiz is one of the "Hornblower Mountains" from where the assembly of the Lordship of Biscay was gathered in the Middle Ages. This gathering was done by lighting fires and blowing into horns.

The legend says that also here Mari, "The Lady of Anboto", has a dwelling. Tradition says that every seven years Mari goes from Anboto to Oiz, and the weather and the good or bad crops depend on where she is.

On February 19, 1985, Iberia Airlines Flight 610 from Madrid to Bilbao hit the antenna and crashed into the north slopes of Oiz, causing the death of all passengers and crew, 148 people overall.

== Hornblower mountains ==
Bocineros mountains are called (in Basque Deiadar-Mendiak) to five summits of Biscay, in the Basque Country (Spain) from which, using sound and light signals, were summoned to General Meetings of the Lordship of Biscay. These mountains, strategically scattered throughout the territory are:

- Kolitza of 879 meters in the region of Las Encartaciones.
- Ganekogorta of 998 meters above Bilbao.
- Gorbea of 1,481 meters above the Arratia-Nervión on the border with Álava.
- Oiz of 1,026 meters on the Durango, Lea Artibai and Urdaibai.
- Sollube of 686 meters above Bermeo Urdaibai and Txorierri.

From these peaks, visible from the whole territory, beeps with horns and trumpets made of other materials and bright with big bonfires, which were held up once had dawned, summoning the parents of the General Assembly of Vizcaya were made. This form of announcement would be made since the Middle Ages.

== Ascent routes ==
From the road that winds the west side of the massif, where the Viewpoint Bizkaiko Talaia (Balcony of Biscay) is located, conveniently track marked with signs marking the route to Oiz (1,029 m) by Donesolo hill (550 m) ascend toward the pass Arreseburu (798 m) where the chapel of San Cristobal is contact with the runway and the Oiz is made. Other notable hits from the north side are Ziortza (307 m) or the port of Gontzegarai (360 m). In the latter case, a track leads to the pass and village Kortaguren (595 m). Going up the mountain directly from this point. On the eastern side the ascent is from the port of Trabakua (405 m) by Zengotitagana hill (812 m) to connect with the eastern hillock of Mount Oiz.
