= Iberia Flight 610 =

1985 aviation accident in Spain

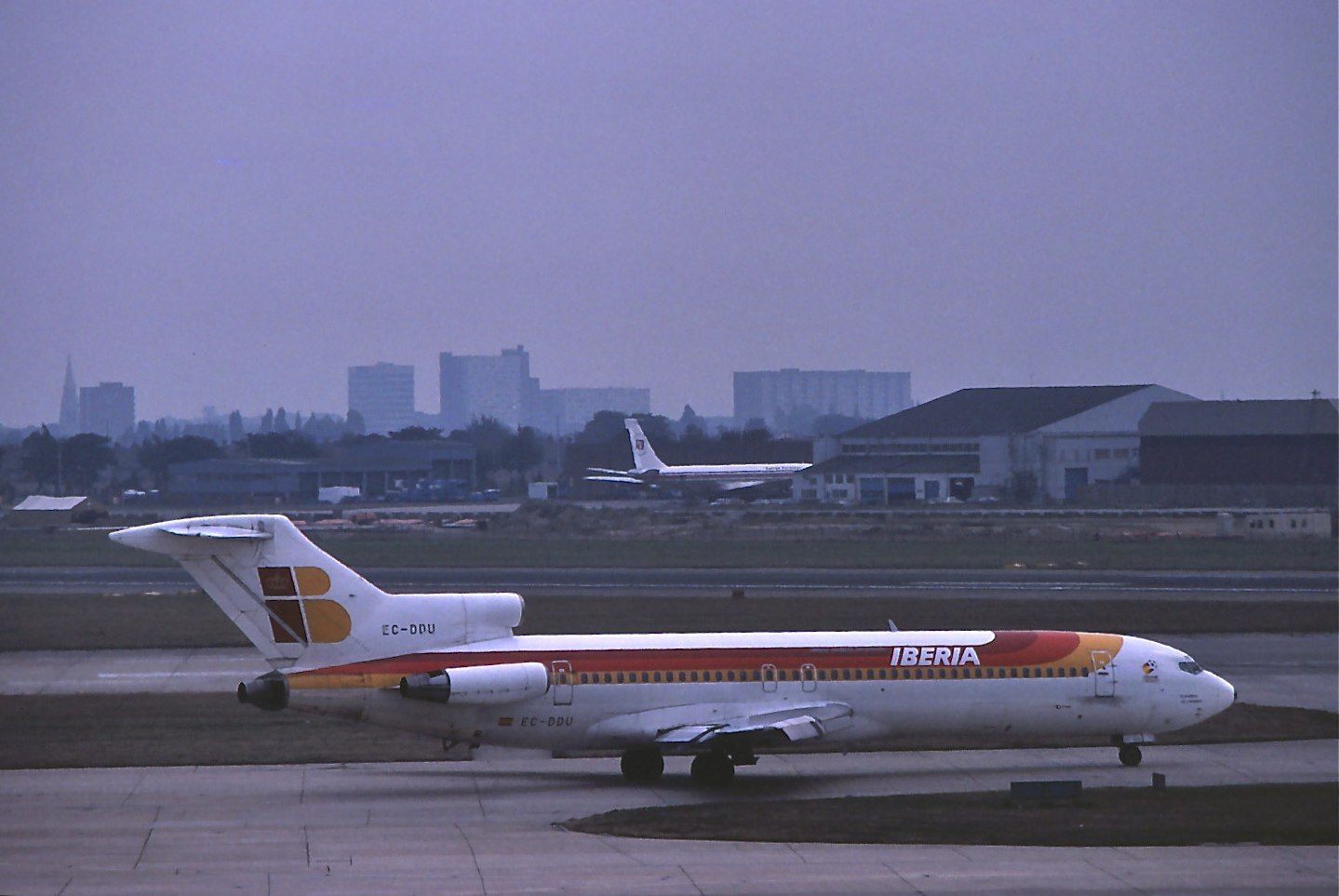
- EC-DDU, the aircraft involved in the accident, pictured in 1982

Accident
- Date: 19 February 1985
- Summary: Controlled flight into terrain due to pilot error
- Site: Mount Oiz, Biscay, near Bilbao Airport, Spain; 43°13′42″N 2°35′24″W

Aircraft
- Aircraft type: Boeing 727–256
- Aircraft name: Alhambra de Granada
- Operator: Iberia
- IATA flight No.: IB610
- ICAO flight No.: IBE610
- Call sign: IBERIA 610
- Registration: EC-DDU
- Flight origin: Madrid–Barajas Airport, Spain
- Destination: Bilbao Airport, Spain
- Occupants: 148
- Passengers: 141
- Crew: 7
- Fatalities: 148
- Survivors: 0

Iberia Flight 610 was a scheduled domestic passenger flight from Madrid to Bilbao, Basque Country, Spain. On 19 February 1985, a Boeing 727-200 operating the flight crashed into a ravine after one of its wings sliced a television antenna on the summit of Mount Oiz in Biscay during an approach to Bilbao Airport. All 141 passengers and 7 crew on board died. The crash is the deadliest aviation disaster in both the Basque Country and Iberia history.

Spanish officials concluded that the crash had been caused by pilot error. During the approach to Bilbao, the autopilot's altitude select system failed to engage due to undetermined reasons, enabling the aircraft to descend past its target altitude. The altitude alarm had sounded to inform the crew that they had reached the intended altitude. However, both crew members misinterpreted it and caused the aircraft to fly even lower. The left wing eventually struck a television antenna, shearing it off and causing the aircraft to crash.

As of 2026, Iberia Flight 610 remains the third-deadliest aviation accident in mainland Spain, behind Spanair Flight 5022 in 2008 and Avianca Flight 011 in 1983, and the deadliest crash on mainland Spanish territory without any survivors.

== Background ==
=== Aircraft ===
The aircraft involved was a Boeing 727–256, MSN 1487, registered as EC-DDU. Manufactured in 1979, the aircraft was powered by three Pratt & Whitney JT8D-9A turbofan engines capable of carrying 189 passengers. It was delivered to Iberia later in the same year and was named Alhambra de Granada, referencing the Alhambra in Andalusia. It had flown 13,408 hours at the time of the accident.

=== Passengers ===
The aircraft was carrying 141 passengers and 7 crew members. While the majority of the passengers were Spaniards, authorities also confirmed that several foreigners were on board the aircraft. Among those confirmed were three Bolivians and three Americans. Two Britons, one Swiss, and one Dutch person were stated to be on board, however these reports could not be confirmed.

Notable passengers include then-incumbent Bolivian Labor Minister Gonzalo Guzman Eguez, who was travelling to Spain to hold talks with authorities on the construction of La Paz - El Alto railway, and former Spanish Foreign Minister under Franco's regime, Gregorio López-Bravo.

=== Crew members ===
The commander of the flight was identified as 51-year-old Captain José Luis Patiño y Arróspide, 14th Viscount of Perellós. Spanish newspaper El Pais described Patiño as an aristocratic pilot after it was discovered that he was a peer. A senior pilot in the airline, he had been flying with Iberia for 19 years. He had accumulated a total flying experience of 13,600 hours (including 4,882 hours on the Boeing 727), having previously flown with Spantax before joining Iberia. His co-pilot was 38-year-old First Officer Emilio López Peña Ordóñez. He had accumulated a total flying experience of 5,548 hours, of which more than 2,800 were on the type. There was also a flight engineer on board, identified as 38-year-old Gregorio Arroba Martín Delgado. He had 2,721 flight hours, all of which were on the Boeing 727.

=== History ===
In 1984, following a disastrous financial year, Iberia decided to withhold the salaries of its pilots. Dozens of Iberia pilots went on strike, including Captain Patiño. The strike was regarded by the Spanish government as one of the most serious strikes in Iberia's history, as the company had lost a total of 2.4 billion pesetas as of July 19. After threatening Iberia that they would not fly flights that were crucial to Iberia's financial operation, Iberia issued multiple sanctions and fired many of the striking pilots, including Captain Patiño's contract, which was terminated on July 18. The government was forced to intervene, and Spanish ministers eventually ordered arbitration between Iberia and the Spanish pilots' union (SEPLA), which was agreed upon by both parties. The Spanish judiciary eventually ruled in favor of the pilots and let them return to Iberia. Patiño eventually joined back in November. As Patiño had just been fired from Iberia, he had to be trained again to obtain his flying license.

== Flight ==
Flight 610 was a scheduled domestic passenger flight from Spanish capital of Madrid to Bilbao, the largest city in Basque Country. Piloted by Captain Patiño and First Officer López, the aircraft was supposed to take off from Madrid–Barajas Airport in the morning. The flight was a short one as the aircraft was expected to arrive approximately 45 minutes later.

On February 19, Flight 610 departed Madrid at 08:47 CET with 141 passengers and 7 crew members. It was scheduled to land at Bilbao Airport at 09:35. First Officer López was the pilot flying, while Captain Patiño was the pilot monitoring. According to the weather report, the area around Bilbao, particularly in the mountains, would be covered with fog. The flight was uneventful until the approach.

=== Approach ===
At 4,300 feet (1,300 m), the crew switched on the altitude alert system whilst flying through overcast and rainy weather. At 09:09, the crew was given permission to descend to 4,300 feet (1,300 m). Contact was then handed over to Bilbao, and at 09:16 First Officer López established contact with the tower of Bilbao Airport. Bilbao ATC then gave permission to the crew to continue their descent.

08:16:03	First Officer López	Bilbao Tower, good morning, Iberia six one zero.
08:16:06	Bilbao ATC	Iberia six one zero, good morning, go ahead.
08:16:09	First Officer López	We are leaving level one three for level one hundred, twenty-eight [miles] out.
08:16:13	Bilbao ATC	Roger, Iberia six one zero, one moment please.
08:16:33	Bilbao ATC	Iberia six one zero, you can continue descent, for an ILS approach to Bilbao, runway three zero, wind is one hundred degrees [at] three knots, QNH one zero two five and transition level seven zero.

The crew repeated the transmitted information, which was immediately followed by the controller's offer for a direct approach to the airport. Choosing the direct approach would have made the aircraft arrive faster, though the aircraft's descent profile would be significantly different from the standard approach. Usually, pilots prefer the direct approach rather than the standard approach to save time. However, on that particular day, Captain Patiño gestured to First Officer Lopez to decline the offer, apparently as a sign of protest to Iberia's management. By choosing the standard approach, the travel time would be longer, and eventually, this would deplete the fuel further. First Officer López then stated that they would fly the standard approach plan to Bilbao rather than the usual "shortcut" approach. Bilbao ATC accepted the transmission and asked the crew to report back when they had reached the VOR of the airport.

The aircraft continued to descend, and the crew began to run through the descent checklist. The aircraft was configured accordingly, and the autopilot's altitude select system was set. The system then sounded its first tonal alarm, indicating that the aircraft was nearing its selected altitude. After the second tonal alarm, the autopilot then levelled the aircraft at the targeted altitude and the aircraft passed the VOR at 09:22. The crew reported on the VOR passage of Bilbao at an altitude of 7,000 feet (2,100 m), reaching the starting point of the final approach. The crew received permission to descend to an altitude of 5,000 feet (1,500 m).

08:22:04	First Officer López	Seven thousand feet over the VOR, Iberia six one zero, initiating the maneuver.
08:22:07	Bilbao ATC	Roger, six one zero.

This was the last radio transmission from Flight 610 to Bilbao ATC. Afterwards, the aircraft began to initiate a tight turn to the right heading towards the outbound leg and the pilots lowered the target altitude from 7,000 ft to 5,000 ft into the autopilot.

=== Crash ===
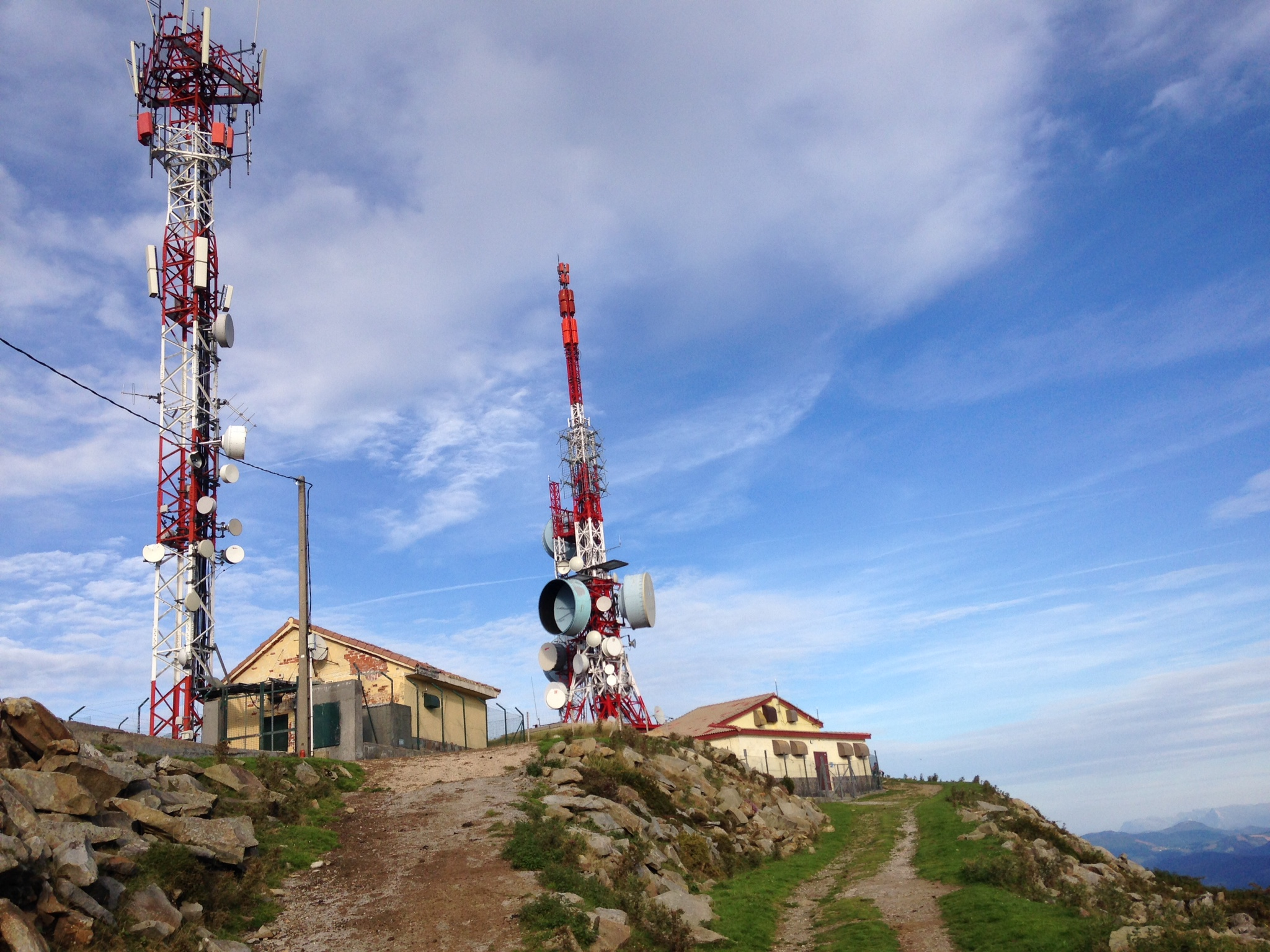
EITB antennas in 2014

Approximately 900 feet from the target altitude of 5,000 ft, the first tonal alarm sounded. The aircraft reached 5,000 feet (1,500 m) at 09:25 and the second tonal alarm informed the crew that the aircraft had reached the intended altitude. The target altitude was lowered again, this time to 4,300 ft. The crew then commanded the autopilot to increase the rate of descent to 1,500 ft in order to quickly reach the intended altitude. The altitude alert went off and the crew continued the descent as the second tonal alarm had not sounded. The crew began to initiate the loop back towards the airport by making a tight turn to the left. During the turn, they would bypass Mount Oiz.

The rate of descent was eventually decreased to 750 feet per minute. The pilots then fed the autopilot with the intended input and began to configure the flaps. The aircraft continued to descend. The weather conditions at that time were cloudy with fog, with 4 kilometres (2.5 mi) of visibility.

08:26:54	First Officer López	Five, please.
08:26:57	First Officer López	Minimum, one six three, four thousand three hundred, [in the] curve-
08:27:04	Commentary	Sound of impact
	Unidentified	My God!
	Commentary	Unidentified noises
	Commentary	*Sounds of screaming*
08:27:14	Commentary	End of recording

At 08:27, after 57 seconds from the moment of descent to a safe altitude, flying 177 feet (54 m) above Mount Oiz (elevation 3,356 feet (1,023 m)) in a landing configuration, and at a speed of 239 miles per hour (208 kn; 385 km/h), the aircraft's left wing collided with an antenna of the Euskal Telebistarues (EITB) television tower at 3,356 feet (1,023 m). The tower struck right between the airframe and the wing, completely shearing the wing off from the airframe. Losing all possible lift from the left side, the aircraft immediately rolled to the left and dived towards the woods. It hit dozens of pine trees in the process, leaving swathes of cut trees for 930 meters before it crashed into a ravine in inverted condition. The wreckage slid for another 230 meters, ending in a tremendous explosion and instantly killing all 148 passengers and crew on board.

== Response ==
The crash site was discovered by a family that had run towards the forest to investigate. After informing emergency services about the accident, personnel began to be deployed to the area, with the Spanish Civil Guard being the first to arrive. Local volunteers helped with the search and rescue operation as well. An emergency meeting chaired by then Basque Government Interior Minister Luis Maria Retolaza was later convened at a local hamlet.

As the crash site was scattered over a radius of 2–3 km and located up in the mountains, the recovery operation was rendered difficult. Helicopters had to be deployed to the crash site. An initial 300 personnel took part in the operation. Bodies of the victims were later taken to Bilbao's Garellano military barracks for identification. Meanwhile, Iberia provided relatives of the victims with flights to Bilbao and accommodation for post-mortem analysis of the corpses. Doctors were also provided for the families for trauma healing. The president of Iberia, Carlos Espinosa de los Monteros, however, asked relatives to return home, as their presence to identify their loved ones was "hardly useful".

During the search and rescue operation, Spanish authorities warned that some corpses may not be able to be identified due to the destructive nature of the crash. Basque newspaper El Correo stated that the only body recovered intact was a body that had been placed inside a coffin, which was located inside the cargo hold during the crash. It was reported that a total of 7 bodies could not be identified due to the severity of the impact and therefore had to be buried at a mass grave in Bilbao's Derio cemetery.

Volunteers later accused officials of being inept after alleging that there was neither an action plan nor coordination among rescue personnel during the operation. News media eventually gained access to the crash site and began photographing the victims. Images of dead bodies were broadcast on multiple Spanish TV stations.

On 20 February, a funeral mass was held in Bilbao's Basilica of Begoña. The event was attended by Queen Sofia, Transport Minister Enrique Barón, other members of the Spanish royal house, and high-ranking government officials. The service also drew a total of approximately 2,000 mourners. Bishop of Bilbao, Luis María Larrea, described the crash as "a bloody involuntary catastrophe that is remembered in the entire history of the Basque Country".

Following the crash, Iberia was required to pay compensations of at least 3.5 million pesetas for each of the deceased. Analysts stated that the total compensations had amounted to 100 million pesetas, with each family receiving an average of 7 million pesetas. Several families refused to accept the payments, and some instead decided to file a criminal complaint against the company. Other than Iberia, Spanish media were also sued by next of kin. The family of Captain Patiño accused Spanish newspapers El País and Diario 16 of slandering Patiño following reports that he had been drunk while flying the aircraft. The Madrid court later rewarded the family with 10 million pesetas in compensation from both media, which would later be challenged in an appeal by El País.

Months after the disaster, then-President of Iberia and Aviaco Carlos Espinosa de los Monteros resigned from his position following pressures from the National Institute of Industry regarding a report on Captain Patiño's training course.

== Investigation ==
Following the crash, questions were raised regarding the possible causes of the crash. The published approach chart indicated that Bilbao's minimum safety altitude was at 4,360 feet, while the aircraft purportedly had been flying at a significantly lower altitude of 3,398 feet. The president of Iberia later confirmed that the Boeing 727 had been flying too low but refused to elaborate further.

The construction of the involved television tower on Mount Oiz was also criticized as the chart revealed that the television tower had not been included in the chart. Conservative opposition Grupo Popular accused the Ministry of Transport of not being able to maintain a high level of security in the country's aviation sector. The owner of the television tower, Euskal Telebista, claimed that the construction of the tower was not illegal.

The flight recorders were recovered on the same day of the crash and were taken to Madrid for further analysis.

=== Conduct of approach ===
The analysis of the flight recorders indicated that there was a discrepancy between the pilots' expected altitude and the actual altitude that they had been flying during the approach. The pilots apparently believed that they were at the correct altitude, even though the actual altitude showed that they were lower by about 300 meters. The error might have started before they conducted the type of approach to Bilbao.

Since the airport was surrounded by mountains, the standard approach would have required the crew to take a detour before they could reach their destination. The crew would have needed to maintain their altitude at a minimum of 7,000 ft until they reached the airport's VOR, located on the west side of the aerodrome. Upon reaching it, they would then turn again, facing towards the approach fix point, which was located opposite of the airport's VOR, and descend to 5,000 ft before continuing their journey to reach said point. By then, they would need to loop back to line the aircraft up with the runway before they could begin the landing phase.

Taking the total distance into account, the standard approach was long and complicated. The crew had to fly past the airport for approximately 13 nautical miles before directing their aircraft back towards the airport. To cut time, air traffic controllers sometimes offered a shortcut for pilots who were flying to Bilbao, in which they would be instructed to fly directly to the airport's approach fix. This action was not unusual and was considered acceptable as long as there was only light traffic in the area. If the pilots accepted the offer, then they would need to maintain their altitude at 7,000 ft before joining the airport's minimum safe altitude of 4,354 feet and looping back towards the airport.

The recording of the cockpit voice recorder suggested that First Officer López had intended to accept the offer. However, he changed his mind after Captain Patiño, according to the investigation, made some kind of sign or gesture to refuse it and take the former option instead. The crew eventually elected to follow the standard approach. The investigation team noted that the types of approaches that they had taken differed greatly from each other. By taking the standard approach, they were allowed to descend to 5,000 ft while flying towards the approach fix. If they had taken the shortcut, they would have needed to maintain 7,000 ft before they reached the approach fix point. Since the aircraft had been maintaining 7,000 ft, by the time they reached the approach fix, the crew would have to make a rapid rate of descent to reach the airport's minimum safe altitude in a timely manner.

However, even though both pilots had opted to follow the standard approach instead of the shortcut, the flight recorder showed that First Officer López, who was at the controls, somehow made an input for a shortcut approach by increasing the aircraft's rate of descent by a great deal. First Officer López suddenly entered a rate of descent input of 1,500 ft while the aircraft was descending through 5,600 ft. As the travel distance for the standard approach was much longer than the shortcut approach, the crew had enough time to slowly adjust their altitude, and the aircraft didn't need such a high rate of descent. First Officer López might have forgotten the type of approach that they had taken. As a result of his input, the aircraft quickly descended to the intended altitude.

=== Altitude alarm ===
Despite the high rate of descent, the aircraft was equipped with an altitude select system. The system was equipped with an alarm, which it would activate to inform the crew that they would reach the intended altitude in less than 900 feet. The altitude that had been selected into the autopilot system was still within the safe limit for an approach to Bilbao, and if the altitude select system had worked properly, then the crew would have heard the tone, and the aircraft would have stopped descending by the time it had reached its intended altitude.

The altitude select system was integrated into the autopilot system of the aircraft. To use the feature, pilots must switch the system to altitude capture mode. That way, the autopilot would try to "capture" the intended altitude. After feeding the autopilot with the input, the autopilot would cause the aircraft to fly to the intended altitude. Before activating it, the pilots should decide on the altitude they would like to fly at by turning the altitude knob. Afterwards, the pilots should arm the autopilot by pressing the "ALT SEL" button. The autopilot would be activated, and the aircraft would fly accordingly. The system was also equipped with a horn that would sound whenever the aircraft approached the intended altitude. The two-second aural tone would sound when the aircraft was about 900 feet from its selected altitude. The alarm would also sound again at another time when the aircraft deviated from its target altitude by 300 feet. Other than the alarm, the sound would also be accompanied by the activation of the altitude lights. The altitude alert light would illuminate on the aircraft's control panel, which was located directly in front of the crew. The lights would stay on until the aircraft reached 300 feet from its intended altitude, where they would turn off.

In Flight 610, both the altitude select alarm and lights had worked properly according to their designs. However, due to the way the system works, their activation unfortunately caused both pilots to misinterpret the situation. The incident happened while the aircraft was descending through 5,000 ft, during which one of the pilots selected an altitude of 4,300 ft into the autopilot. At the time they made the input, the aircraft was flying approximately 700 ft above its intended altitude. Since the aircraft's altitude was already below 900 ft, the aural tone didn't turn on. Meanwhile, the altitude light immediately turned on. The crew didn't notice this since the alarm didn't sound. By the time the alarm blared, the crew thought that they were 900 ft above the selected altitude. The aircraft, in fact, was flying 300 ft below its intended altitude. As First Officer López, who was in control, thought that there were still 900 feet left to reach their target altitude, the aircraft continued to descend further.

Even with such a mistake, the aircraft would have still leveled off at the intended altitude since the altitude capture mode had been engaged, and as such, the aircraft wouldn't have continued its descent. In Flight 610, instead of leveling off, the aircraft descended even further. The investigation eventually revealed that the crew had never used the altitude capture mode during the descent to 4,300 feet. Several tests were conducted, and it was eventually found that the system could be accidentally disengaged in several ways. Among those were manually changing the altitude while the aircraft was flying through the previously selected altitude, selecting an altitude that was too close to the present altitude, and disengaging and then re-engaging the autopilot. Investigators, however, concluded that the cause of the unengaged altitude select system was simply caused by either the pilots forgetting to press the "ALT SEL" button to engage the system or one of them accidentally disarming it by pushing the button for a second time. In any case, the unengaged autopilot allowed the aircraft to continue its descent past its target altitude and caused it to fly lower than the minimum safe altitude, enabling the collision to happen.

=== Crew error ===
Even with all the errors, the aircraft wouldn't have crashed had the pilots paid attention to the altimeter. However, investigators thought that the crew might have misread the reading, hence causing a misinterpretation. This might be attributed to the design of the altimeter that had been used in the Boeing 727.

The involved aircraft was equipped with the drum and needle altimeter, a type of altimeter that has two different displays for the altitude. The circular dial would display the hundreds of feet, while the rotating drum would show the thousands. The type was extensively used in the Boeing 727 during the 20th century. However, several studies showed that the use of such an altimeter increased the risk of misinterpretation since it was hard for pilots to read the small window for the different altitudes in thousands and hundreds. A NASA survey revealed that more than 80% of the pilots that were sampled reportedly misread the altimeter, and around the same percentage repeated the same mistake more than once. This resulted in multiple accidents and led the FAA to discontinue the use of such an altimeter on U.S. carriers. The policy was not implemented in Spain, and therefore the design was still used in Spanish airliners.

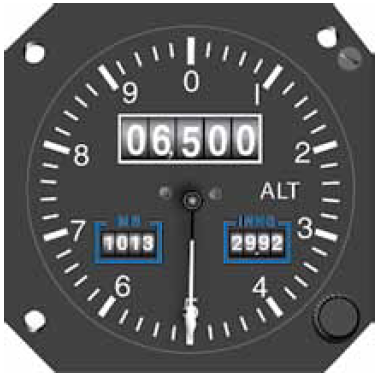
A schematic of a "drum-needle" altimeter

Due to the use of the drum and needle altimeter, pilots would normally glance a bit at the altimeter and overlook the displayed information. This was further corroborated by findings obtained from simulation flights and interviews that had been conducted by investigators, in which pilots had only glanced a little and eventually became uncertain of their aircraft's actual altitude. Many pilots eventually had to assume the altitude they were flying at. In Flight 610, investigators thought that the pilot who was at the controls at the time, First Officer López, had misread the altimeter and assumed that the aircraft was approximately 1,000 feet higher than the airport's minimum safe altitude, allowing the aircraft to descend even further.

Despite the misreading, they should have been aware of it since there was a monitoring pilot inside the cockpit, who was responsible for monitoring the instruments. Captain Patiño, the pilot monitoring who had been with First Officer López throughout the flight, should have monitored the altimeter and conducted altitude callouts every 1,000 ft. The cockpit voice recording indicated that he was almost wholly absent from the flight and instead stayed mostly silent during the approach. He was also supposed to handle the communication between Flight 610 and the ATC in Bilbao, but during the approach the communication was conducted by First Officer López, who at the time was also at the controls.

Other than the callout, the investigation also found several other deficiencies regarding the conduct of Captain Patiño that might have contributed to the cause of the crash. Despite being the pilot monitoring, Captain Patiño was believed to have influenced First Officer López's decision during the flight. When the crew was offered the shortcut by the ATC, Captain Patiño seemed to give a negative response to First Officer López, which caught him off guard and caused him to momentarily forget that they were making a standard approach instead of the usual shortcut, causing the high rate of descent. While the aircraft was descending through 5,000 ft, one of the pilots made an input into the altitude select system and chose 4,300 ft, which was less than 900 ft from their present altitude and caused the altitude alarm not to sound. It was believed that Captain Patiño was the one who was responsible for changing the altitude. While making such input, he didn't inform First Officer López, and eventually, this caused First Officer López to suffer memory lapse during the approach.

Due to the lack of altitude callouts and monitoring on the instruments, the aircraft was allowed to descend even further. Captain Patiño's silent conduct during the entirety of the flight confounded First Officer López's performance, who had been controlling and handling the communication between Flight 610 and the airport. The aircraft descended below the intended altitude for 57 seconds and struck the antenna, severing the left wing and causing the aircraft to plunge into the ravine.

=== Other deficiencies ===
Investigators were able to identify several other deficiencies in the crash, including the construction of a TV tower on Mount Oiz and the incomplete approach chart. With its height of approximately 1,026 meters (3,366 ft), Mount Oiz was not included in the approach chart that had been used by the crew. The approach chart also didn't include the TV tower. The tower was 28 meters high and exceeded the minimum safety altitude of the airport. Since it was not included, the construction of the tower posed a significant risk to the safety of airliners in the area.

=== Conclusion ===
According to the investigation, the crew distrusted the autopilot during the descent phase, but it is likely that they forgot to turn on the ALT SEL (altitude select) button, accidentally disengaged it, or the system itself malfunctioned. As a result, after reaching their assigned altitude, the autopilot did not support it, which led to a further decline, and the pilots did not control it. When the altitude alert sounded, the crew most probably misinterpreted the alarm. Investigators also discovered that the TV tower installed on the mountain was not marked on the navigation maps available to the crew.

Investigators determined the cause of the crash was pilot error due to the flight crew misinterpreting data and flying the aircraft below the safety altitude. The accident report stated:

"Their [i.e. the pilots'] confidence on the automatic capture performed by the Altitude Alert System, the misinterpretation of its warnings, as well as a probable misreading of the altimeter made the crew fly below the safety altitude, colliding into the television antennas' base, thus losing the left wing, falling to the ground with no possible control of the aircraft."

— Technical Report A-009/1985 – Accident that occurred on February 19, 1985 involving a Boeing 727-256 aircraft, registration EC-DDU, at Monte Oiz (Vizcaya) / CIAIAC

== Aftermath ==
In its final report, the IAIAC issued an order for all airliners in Spain to replace every drum and needle altimeter to avoid future accidents.

Even though the investigation had put the blame on the pilots of the flight, numerous figures including government officials didn't accept the official result. Deputy speaker of Spanish opposition Grupo Popular, José Antonio Trillo, even accused officials of not disclosing the real cause of the crash and refused to rule out terror attack from the causes of the crash, going as far as questioning the actual intentions of the investigators. The family of Captain Patiño also refused to accept the official conclusion of the final report and insisted that the aircraft had been attacked by Basque separatist ETA. Rumors that the ETA brought down the aircraft remain to this day.

In 2021, International Federation of Associations of Air Accident Victims and the Official College of Commercial Aviation Pilots (Copac) appealed to Spanish authorities to clear the crash site from any remaining wreckage and personal belongings after an accidental discovery of several human remains within the crash site. They also voiced their support regarding the construction of a monument near the site to commemorate the victims of the disaster.

== See also ==
- 2012 Mount Salak Sukhoi Superjet 100 crash
- Lokomotiv Yaroslavl plane crash
- Air Bagan Flight 011
