= Urkiola =

Mountain range of the Basque Mountains, Spain

Coordinates: 43°7′N 2°40′W

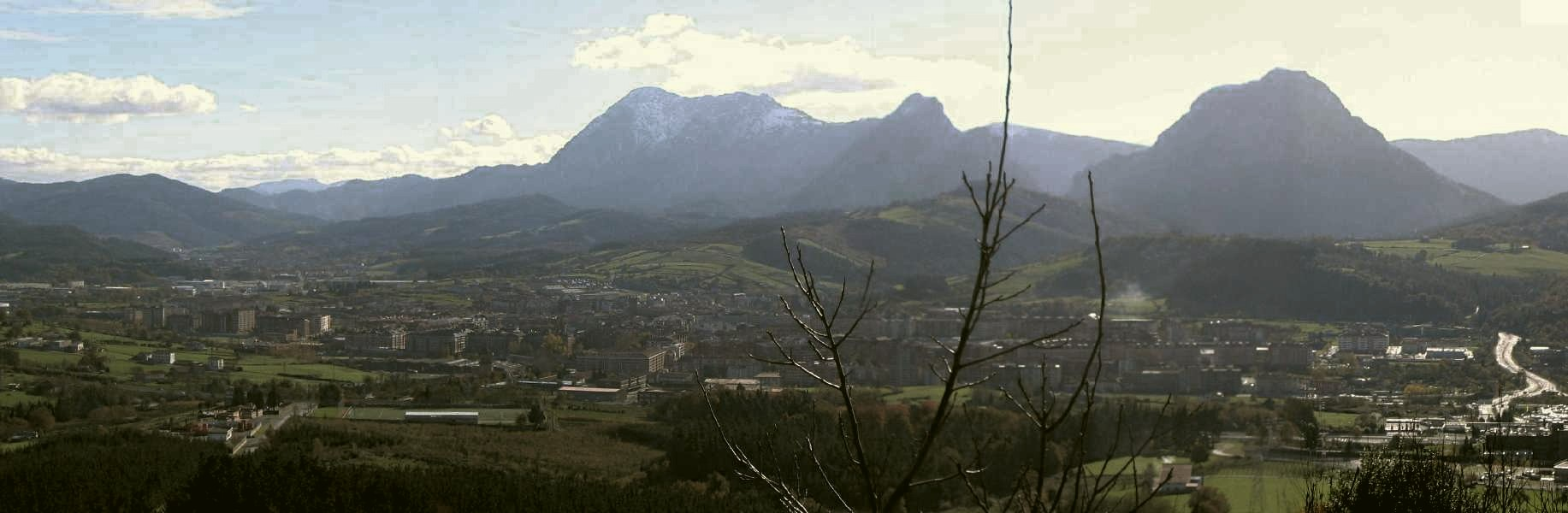
Panoramic view of Urkiola summits, from left to right: Anboto, Alluitz, Aitz Txiki, Untxillaitz.

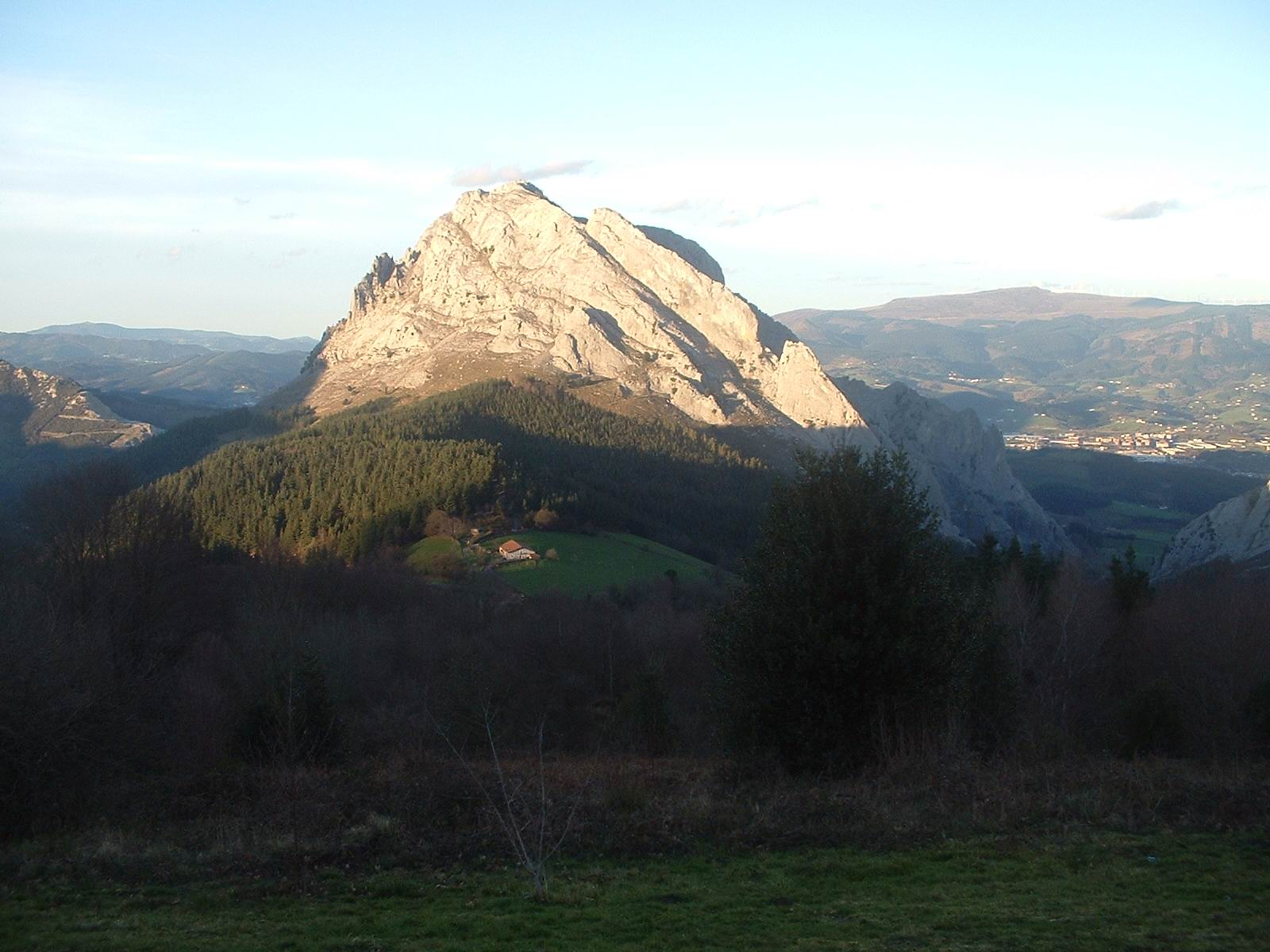
Unzillaitz with Oiz in the background.

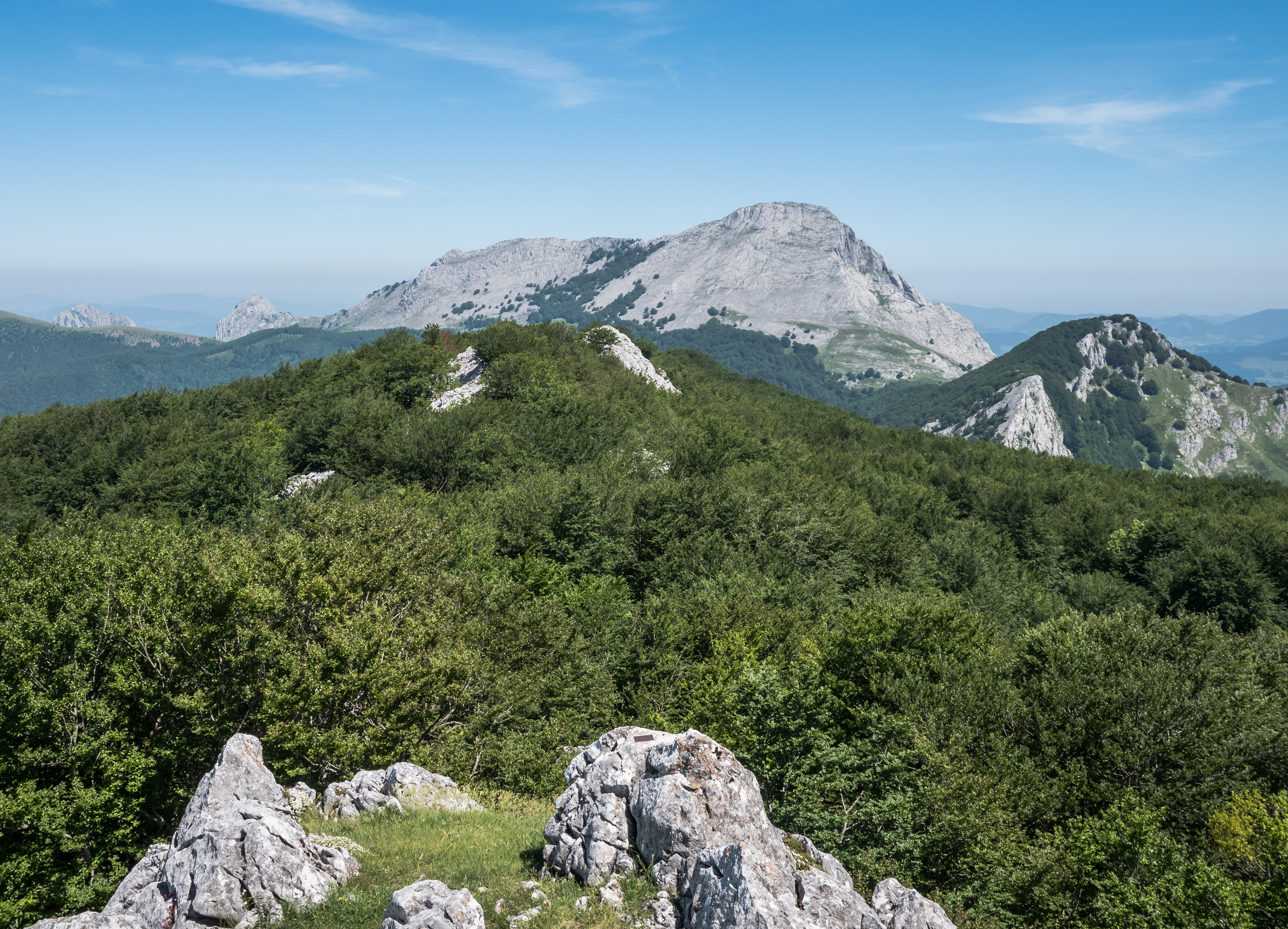
Anboto.

Urkiola is a mountain range of the Basque Mountains in Biscay near Durango, in the western Basque Country, Spain. The highest mountain in the range is Anboto (1331 m). The range runs from west to east and forms the water divide between the Atlantic and the Mediterranean basins.

It was declared natural park on 29 December 1989 prompted by the Basque government's determination to protect the diversity of wildlife and flora it harbours. In the center of this natural park is a church called Santuario de Urkiola, which was at different times served by Saint Antonio Abad and Saint Anthony of Padua.

Basque mythology is also present in this natural park. Tradition holds that a cave perched on eastern side of the Anboto mountain holds the abode of Basque goddess Mari.

== Mountains ==
It is formed by several limestone massifs, from west to east:

- Sierra de Aramotz (800 m)
- Ezkubaratz (1010 m)
- Mugarra (980 m)

At this point of the range the Urkiolamendi pass breaks through it at a height of 711 m, where a sanctuary was built.

- Untxillaitz (900 m)
- Aitz Txiki (791 m)
- Alluitz (1043 m)
- Anboto (1331 m)

To the south of the limestone peaks are two round shaped mounts, called Saibigain and Urkiolamendi (1011 m).

The entire area is enclosed in the Urkiola Natural Park, created by the Basque government to preserve this rich natural area, often known as Little Switzerland. The closeness to Bilbao and easy access through Urkiolamendi pass attract many tourists and hikers all year round.

== History ==
There is evidence that the Roman Empire passed through Urkiola. Some archaeologists found pieces of ceramic in the coast, near the ruins of a Roman village. Above these ruins now exists a Basque village called Forua, a name that comes from "foro".

In Mañaria archaeologist have found a lot of evidence that Visigoths used to live in that part of the mountain range. This could happen due to the fights that the Christians had against the Muslims near Vitoria. Some tablets have been found in Elorrio, proof of Christian presence in the valleys.

In the Middle Ages pastoral activity was common in the mountains and there were a lot of villages in the valleys. There were no people living on the top of the mountains, but there was a military base on the "Aitz txiki" mountain.

There were a lot of churches in Urkiola in the 10th century. One of the most important pieces of evidence of that is a letter from the king of Pamplona Nájera Gárcia Sánchez who says that the churches of Durango are allowed. There are more letters of some abbots of churches like the one which is in Abadiano.

== See also ==
- Urquiola
