= Alluitz =

Mountain in Biscay, Basque Country, Spain

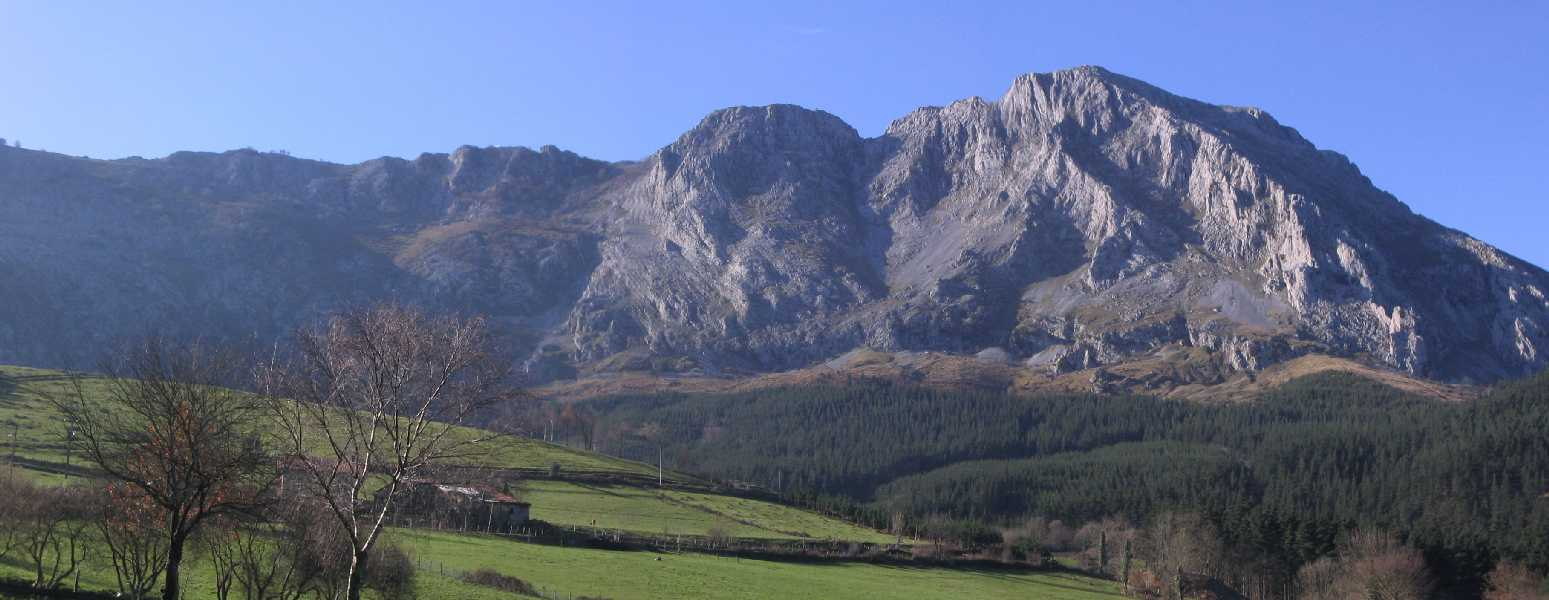
- Alluitz from the east, and part of the crests.

Highest point
- Elevation: 1,034 m (3,392 ft)
- Prominence: 88 m (289 ft)
- Coordinates: 43°10′16.91″N 2°38′20.26″W

Naming
- Language of name: Basque

Geography
- Location: Biscay, Spain
- Parent range: Basque Mountains

Climbing
- First ascent: 1867
- Easiest route: From Atxarte (290 m)

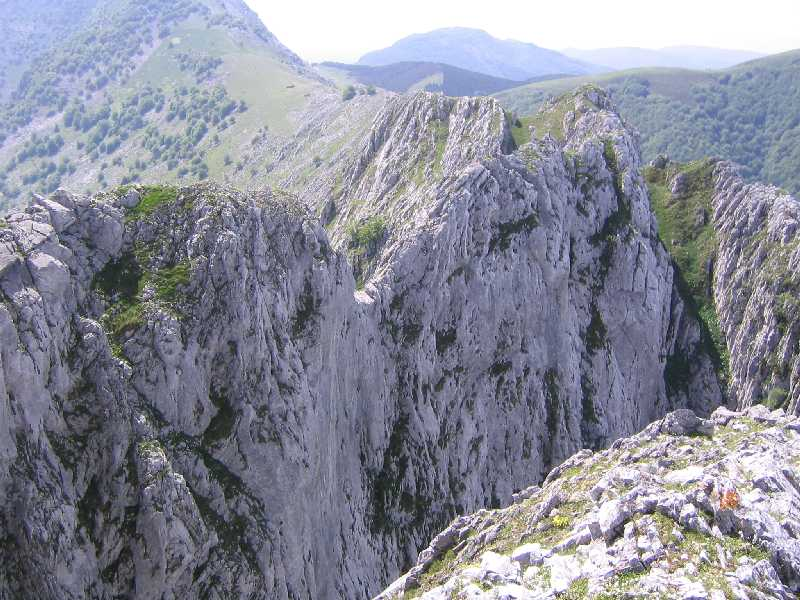
"Devil's Pass" - "Infernuko Zubia".

Alluitz (also Asluze ) is a peak of Biscay, Basque Country (Spain), 1,034.3 metres high.

== Description ==
It is the second highest peak of the Urkiola range. It is part of the same compact gray limestone mass that forms the Anboto.

The main feature of the mountain is the 600m high cliff that forms the south face. The north face, although steep and rough, offers a practical access for experienced climbers.

To reach the summit going along the crests (from Anboto), it's necessary to pass the "Devil's pass" that has taken the lives of some reckless climbers.

== Ascents ==
Atxarte - 1h 30m

The most normal way of access starts from Atxarte (290 m) and ascents to the col of Artola (564m) where it's possible to climb the easy and nearby Aitz Txiki (791m) to the right. To the left of the col starts the climb to the Alluitz, bordering the cliff.

The crest (Devil's Pass) - 3h 30m

Starting at Urkiolamendi pass, this way goes from the col of Larrano (957m) between Alluitz and Anboto, following the dangerous crest, where precaution must be taken. The Devil's Pass or Infenuko Zubia can be perfectly crossed, but it is scary due to the high cliffs on both sides.

Southern face

The southern cliff looks impossible to climb, but here are Biscay's most important rock climbing schools.
