= Urkiola Natural Park =

Protected area in Basque Country, Spain

- IUCN category V (protected landscape/seascape)
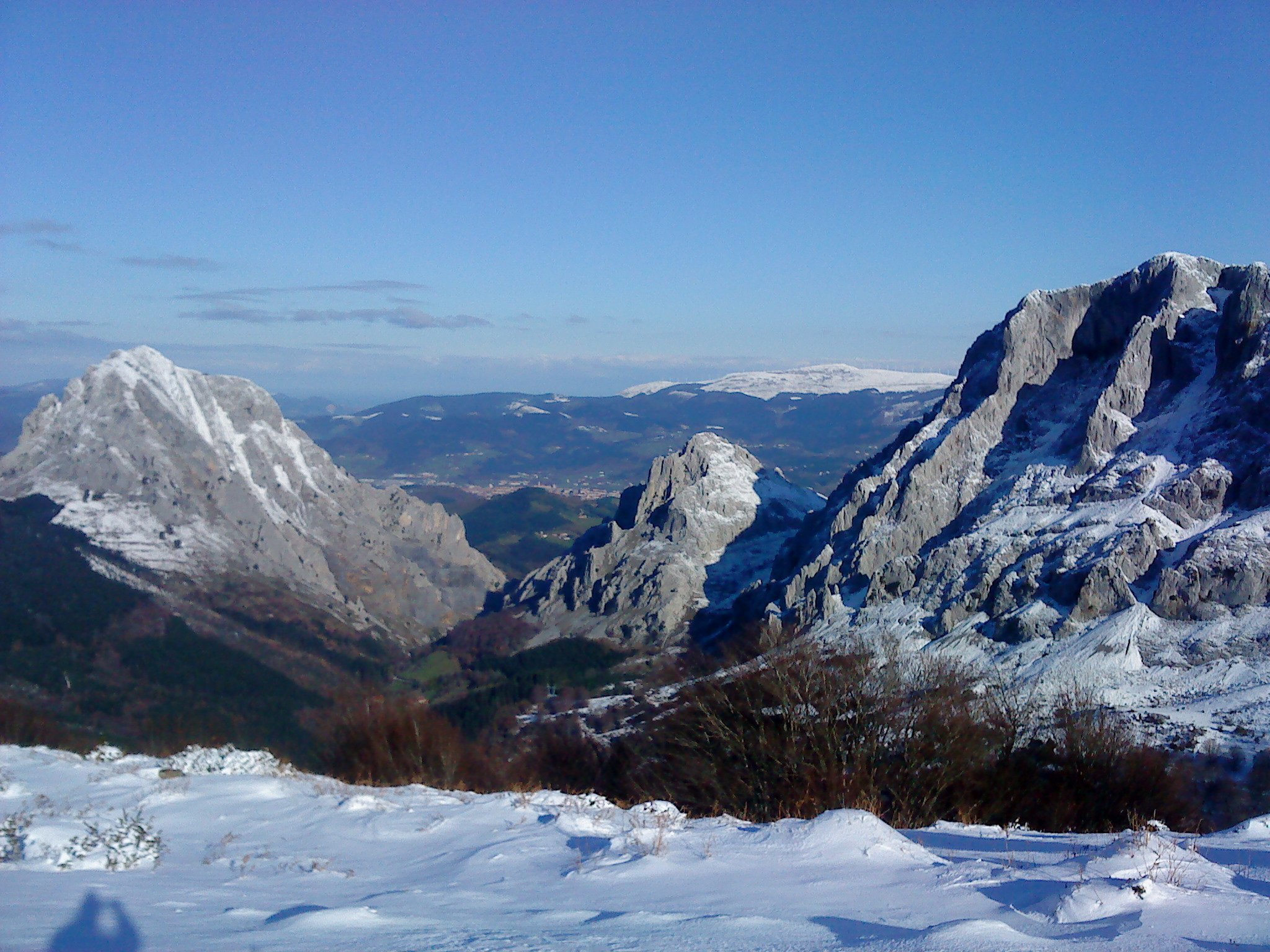
- Urkiola, Untzillaitz, aitz Txiki and Alluitz

- Location of the park within the Basque Country
- Location: Álava, Biscay, Basque Country, Spain
- Nearest city: Abadiño
- Coordinates: 43.116°N 2.669°W
- Area: 5,958 hectares (14,720 acres; 59.58 km^{2})
- Established: 1989
- Governing body: Regional Council of Bizkaia
- Website: urkiola.net

Urkiola Natural Park is a protected area located in the southeastern corner of Biscay and in the North of Álava in the autonomous community of the Basque Country, Spain. It is a protected area of 5,958 hectares (14,720 acres).

It was declared a Natural Park on 29 December 1989.

The Park's highest mountain summit is Anboto at 1,337 metres (4,386 ft). This mountain has a strong mythological significance. Is the main dwelling of Mari, a figure of Basque mythology. Urkiola Natural Park and Gorbea Natural Park form an important environmental unit. Landscape features and easy access have been fundamental to leisure and sports use.

== Description and access ==
Urkiola Natural Park covers an area of 5,958 hectares (59.58 km^{2}; 14,720 acres) and has a perimeter of 83.8 km (52.1 mi). The Natural Park is located in eight municipalities, seven in Biscay and one in Álava.

=== Landscape ===
The landscape of Urkiola Park consists of limestone masses. These rocks have steep slopes, with gullies and cliffs. Karst plains support a diverse and rugged landscape consisting of different proportions of shrubs, grasses, rocks, beech and pine forests.

Mining activity is important in the park and its vicinity. While mineral extraction has been a traditional activity within the land that makes up the Urkiola Natural Park, the mines were closed long ago. Limestone quarries, opencast mines that have a great impact on the landscape, have remained active since the formation of Urkiola Natural Park.

== Geology ==
The abundance of limestone and rainfall in the area has led to a very rich karstic relief, with many caves with prehistoric remains of human occupation, sinkholes and fissures.

== Climate ==
The climate is warm oceanic, with high rainfall with a clear decrease in the summer. Most of the park is about 600 metres (2,000 ft) above sea level. The annual rainfall is around 1,500 millimetres (59 in). The temperature is mild, with a marine influence, and a range between 7 °C (45 °F) mean minimum and maximum average 15 °C (59 °F), with an annual average of 11 °C (52 °F).

== Vegetation and fauna ==
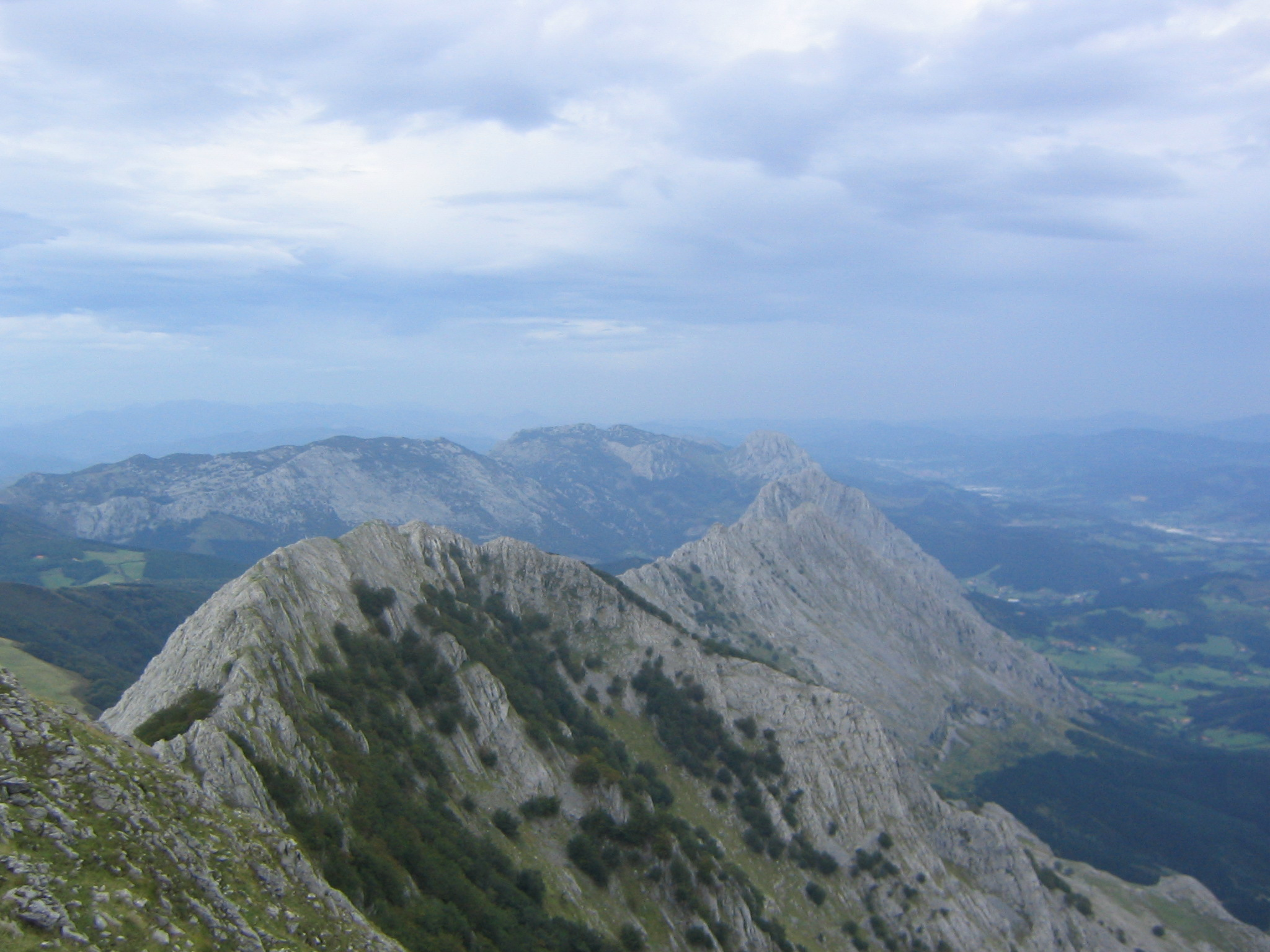
Anboto and Aramotz

=== Vegetation ===
The vegetation of Urkiola Natural Park presents typical features of the Cantabrian-Atlantic provinces of the Euro-Siberian region, with features of the Mediterranean region. The vegetation is:

- Altitudes above 1,000 metres (3,300 ft), where there is presence of boreal-alpine floral elements.
- Large area of limestone rock mass which favour the development of sub-Mediterranean floral elements.

==== Flora ====
The park's vegetation has been influenced by human exploitation through centuries of occupation. Obviously the height and geology also determine the type of vegetation. Have cataloged a total of 694 taxa (species, subspecies and hybrids), among which 156 are classified as being of special interest because of their special endemism. In the Urkiola Natural Park there aren't own unique species.

=== Fauna ===
The fauna of Urkiola Natural Park consists mainly of typical Euro-Siberian species. Others are Mediterranean origin, Ethiopian Eastern and cosmopolitan. The distribution is the following:

- Euro-Siberian: 83%.
- Mediterranean: 13%.
- Cosmopolitan 3%.
- Ethiopian Eastern: 1%.

126 species of vertebrates have been catalogued, excluding Chiroptera (bats). The following table shows the distribution according to their class:

| Classes | Fish | Amphibians | Reptiles | Birds | Mammals |
|---|---|---|---|---|---|
| Number of species | 4 | 7 | 10 | 74 | 31 |
| Percentage | 3,2 | 5,6 | 7,9 | 58,7 | 24,6 |

In the park are a number of protected species, 64 are included in the "National Catalogue of Endangered Species". There are three species can be caught and 12 that can be hunted.

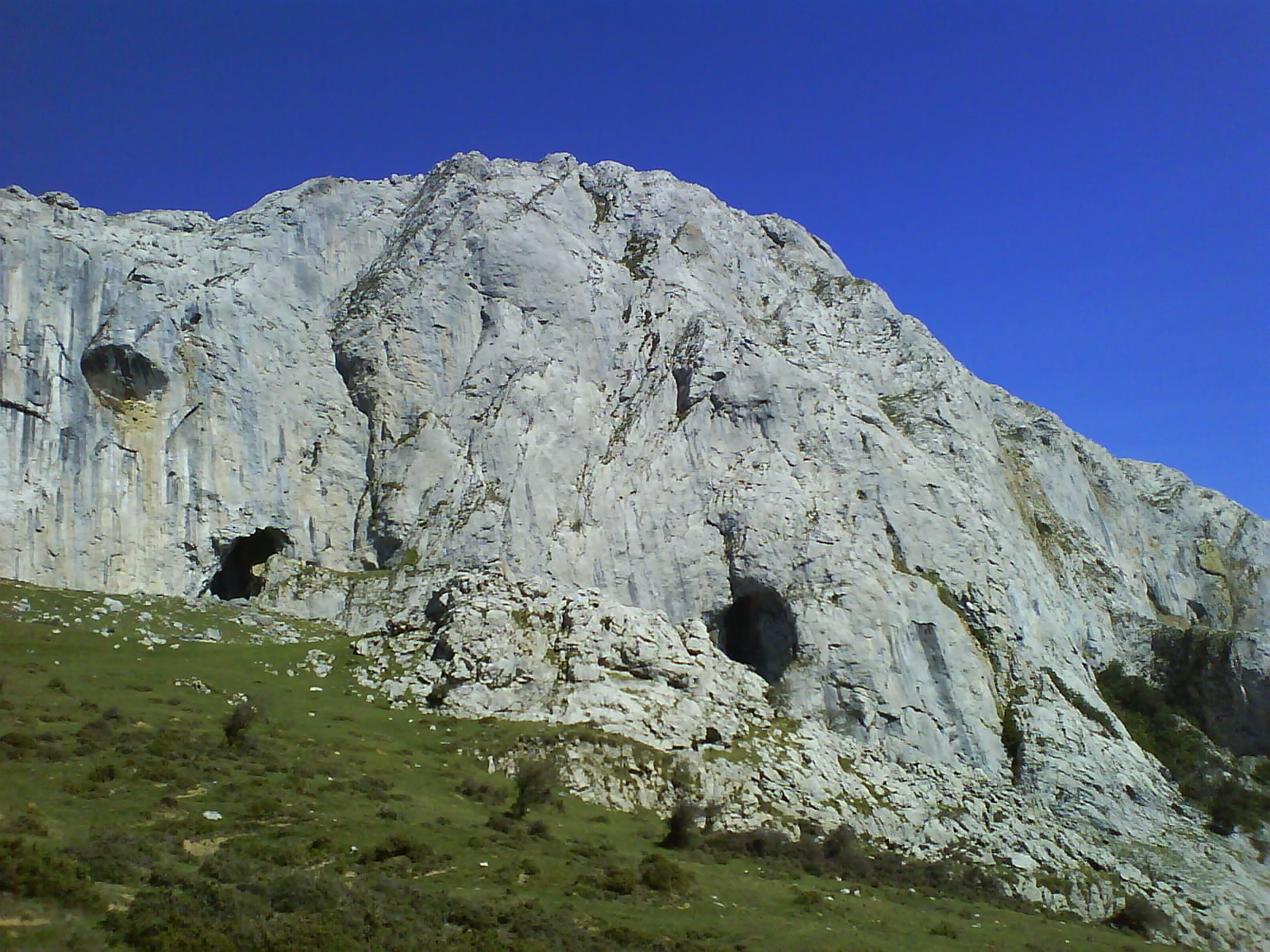
Partial view of the south wall of Mugarra where most of the nests of vultures in the park are located

The Birds Directive of the European Community protects 19 species while the Habitats Directive protects the other 15. There are 106 species that are protected by the Berne Convention, 30 for the Bonn Convention and 15 by the Washington Convention. The "Basque Catalogue of Threatened Species" includes 36 species that are present in the park.

== History of human occupation ==
Urkiola Natural Park contains traces of human occupation since prehistoric times. The caves in the gorge of Atxarte, in the massif of Anboto attest to this. Some ceramic fragments from the Roman Empire and Middle Ages are to be found in the remains of walls in the park.

== Uses of resources in the park ==
=== Logging ===
Logging in Urkiola Natural Park has taken place since time immemorial, in particular beech pollard used for making charcoal, and oaks used for firewood, and pine plantations for the production of paper pulp.

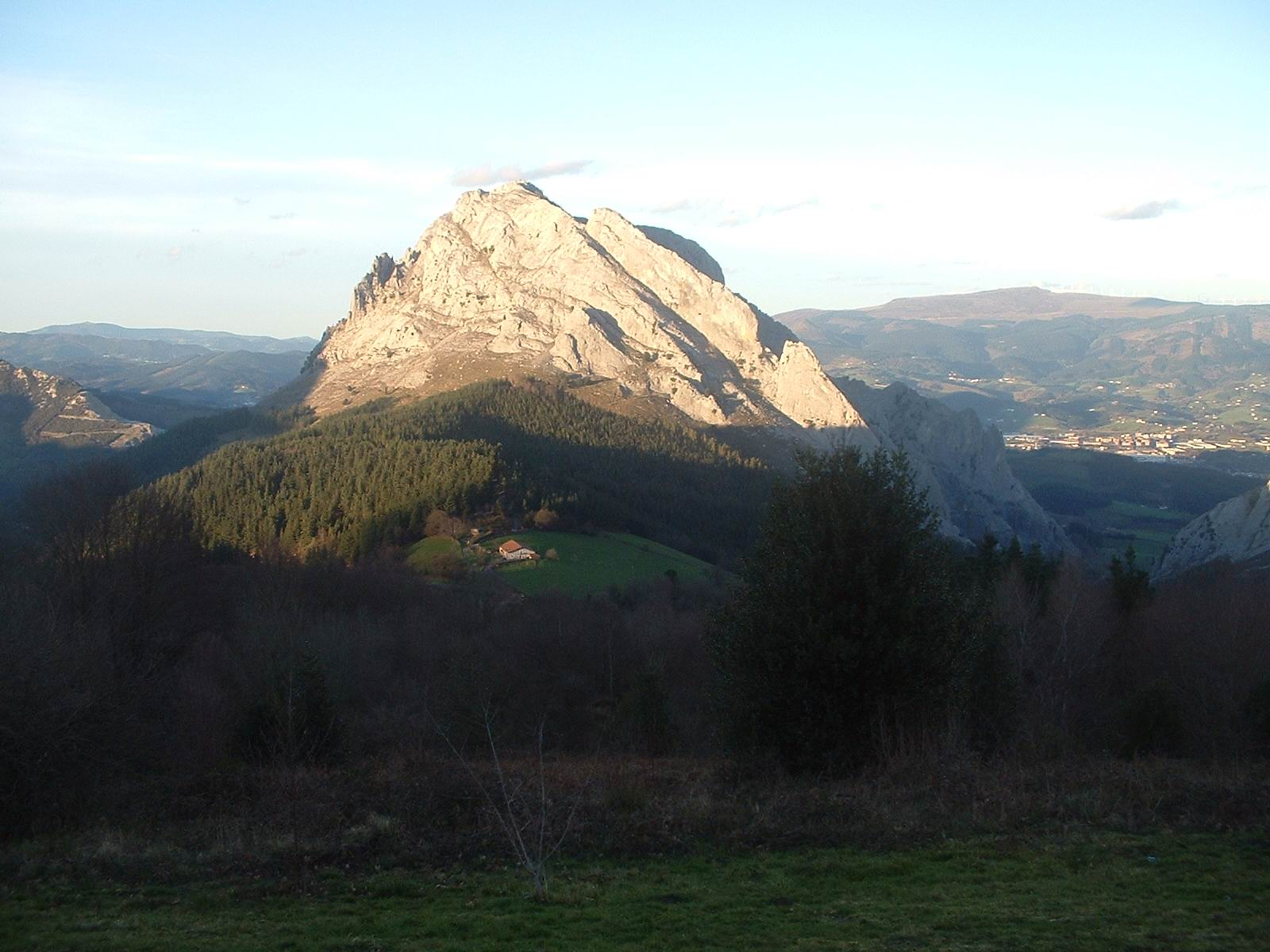
The view of the Urkiola Natural Park from Abadiño

Between 1990 and 2006 185 hectares (460 acres) of forest have been planted in different species, including 148 hectares (370 acres) of hardwood, mainly beech, birch and oak, and 37 hectares (91 acres) of conifers, primarily Douglas fir, radiata pine, larch and Sitka spruce.

=== Agricultural and livestock activities ===
Livestock and pastoral activity has actively contributed to the formation of the current landscape of the park.

Livestock primarily consists of sheep, cattle and horses. The sheep are for producing milk for cheese and curds. The cattle and horses are raised for meat.

=== Hunting and fishing ===
Hunting and fishing activities have little relevance within the Urkiola Natural Park. Around the park hunting is provided in some specific areas where it is mainly for migratory species like woodcock, dove and thrush.

Hunted species include hares, which maintain a high population, and there is some wild boar, deer and partridge.

Fishing is non-existent within the Park area.
