= Anboto =

Mountain in Biscay, Spain

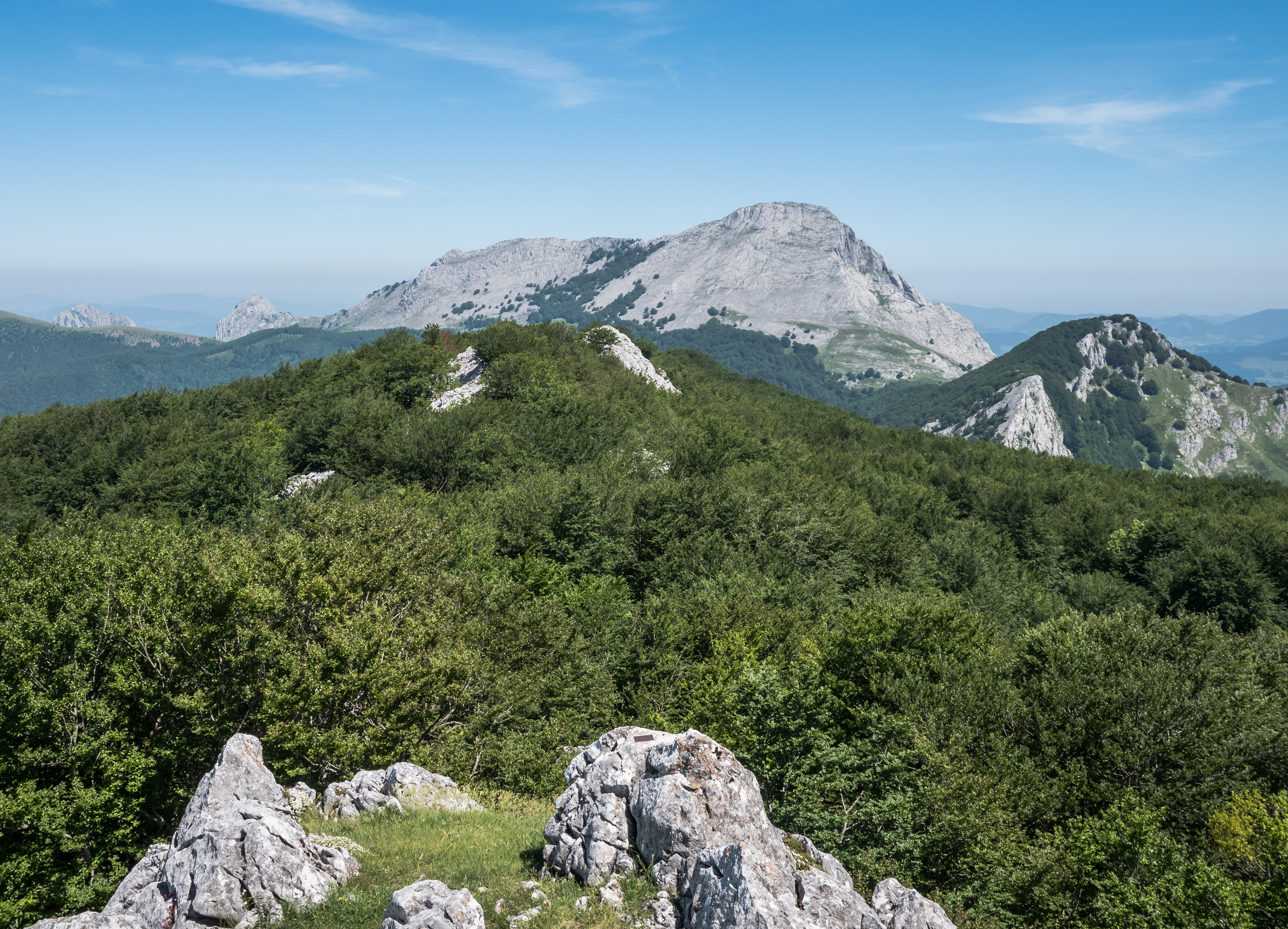
- Anboto seen from the south.

Highest point
- Elevation: 1,331 m (4,367 ft)
- Prominence: 734 m (2,408 ft)
- Coordinates: 43°05′20.70″N 02°35′43.31″W

Naming
- Language of name: Basque

Geography
- Location: Biscay, Spain
- Parent range: Basque Mountains

Geology
- Mountain type: Limestone

Climbing
- Easiest route: From the southern Urkiola pass (711 m)

Anboto (1,331 m or 4,367 ft) is a limestone mountain of the Western Basque Country, the highest peak of the Urkiola range and not far from the Urkiola mountain pass between Durango and Vitoria-Gasteiz.

== Description ==
An immense mass of limestone, very compact and of gray color, the mountain contains fossil remnants of massive prehistoric corals and large seashells.

The north face has impressive 1,000 m (3,300 ft) high cliffs, towering over the valley of Atxondo. The south face descends more smoothly toward the pass of Urkiolamendi; more even, it is used for the more popular routes of ascent.

The ascent, which can be carried out on any of its faces, requires in all cases certain care when passing next to the cliffs.

The Anboto is one of the most known and most characteristic summits of Biscay and of the Basque Country.

On its summit there is a geodesic vertex of second order.

== Mythology ==
Anboto has always been related to magic and mythology. In a cave close to its summit, the legend tells us that Mari, the "Lady of Anboto", has her main dwelling. Legend says that it is usual to see her in the mouth of the cave, on days with good weather, combing her pretty blond hair with a comb of gold in the sunshine. It is not rare either to see her spend nights as a great ball of fire in the sky above Anboto or other places of the Basque Country where she possesses dwellings like the nearby Oiz or Aizkorri. Depending on where she is found there will be good or bad weather.

== Ascents ==
Anboto can be reached from a great number of places. From the north it is a 1,000 m (3,300 ft) ascent from the Atxondo valley. From Urkiolamendi the road begins at the famous sanctuary of San Antonio (730 m; 2,400 ft). From the valley of Atxarte begins the complete ascent of the crests, long but simple along Alluitz (1,034 m; 3,392 ft) and Anboto (1,331 m; 4,367 ft). From Otxandio (549 m; 1,801 ft) or Aramaio (312 m; 1,024 ft), stopping at the extensive grassy hillock of Zabalaundi (896 m; 2,940 ft), being able to climb from here directly to the top passing near the caves of the Lady of Amboto and the "Eye of Eskilar".

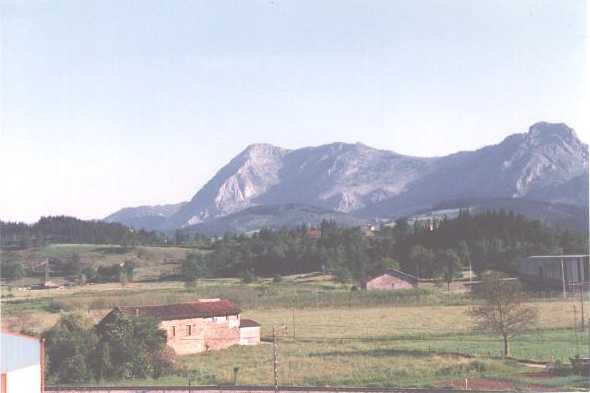
View of the crest of the Anboto from the north.

The most popular way consists of leaving from Urkiolamendi pass, to flank Mount Urkiolamendi (1,009 m; 3,310 ft) arriving at Asuntze (870 m; 2,850 ft), then climbing right under the summit, to the hillock Pagozelai (970 m; 3,180 ft) ascending its stony slopes (Arrueta) to the hillock of Agindi (1,227 m; 4,026 ft) just west of the summit.

The North face is a rocky 1,000 m (3,300 ft) climb that requires some rock climbing and can be very dangerous in bad weather conditions or ice.

Climbing times:

- Urkiolamendi (2h)
- Atxarte (4h, up to the crest)
- Atxarte (2h 30 m, by Asuntze)
- Aramaio (3h)
- Arrazola (2h 15 m, north face)
- Arrazola (3h, by Zabalaundi)

== Sources ==
- Mendikat
- Web sobre Amboto
- Las montañas
