= Abadiño =

Abadiño Abadiano
- Municipality
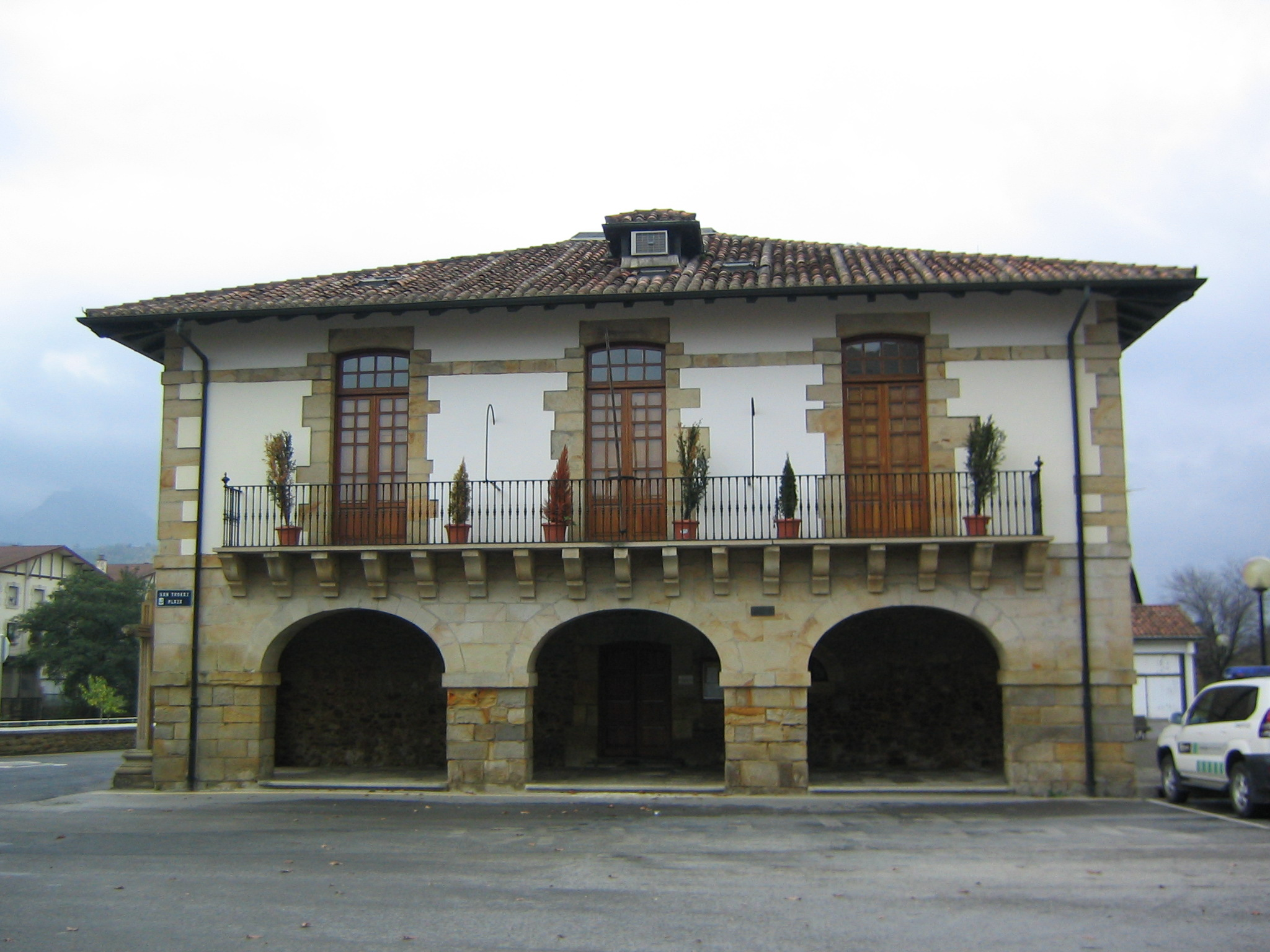
- Abadiño town hall

- Flag Coat of arms

- Location of Abadiño within the Basque Country Abadiño (Spain)
- Coordinates: 43°09′09″N 2°36′27″W
- Country: Spain
- Autonomous community: Basque Country
- Province: Biscay
- Comarca: Durangaldea
- Founded: Unknown

Government
  - Mayor: José Luis Navarro Donaire (Abadiño Independienteak)

Area
  - Total: 36.06 km^{2} (13.92 sq mi)
- Elevation: 144 m (472 ft)

Population (2025-01-01)
  - Total: 7,768
  - Density: 215.4/km^{2} (557.9/sq mi)
- Demonym: Basque: abadiñarra
- Time zone: UTC+1 (CET)
  - Summer (DST): UTC+2 (CEST)
- Postal code: 48220
- Website: Official website

Abadiño (Basque: Abadiño; Spanish: Abadiano) is a town located in the province of Biscay, in the autonomous community of Basque Country, in the north of Spain, about 35 km from the provincial capital of Bilbao. The area of the municipality is about 36 km^{2} (13.9 mi^{2}) and according to the 2014 census, the population is 7504. The original name of the town was Abadiano Celayeta.

== Geography ==
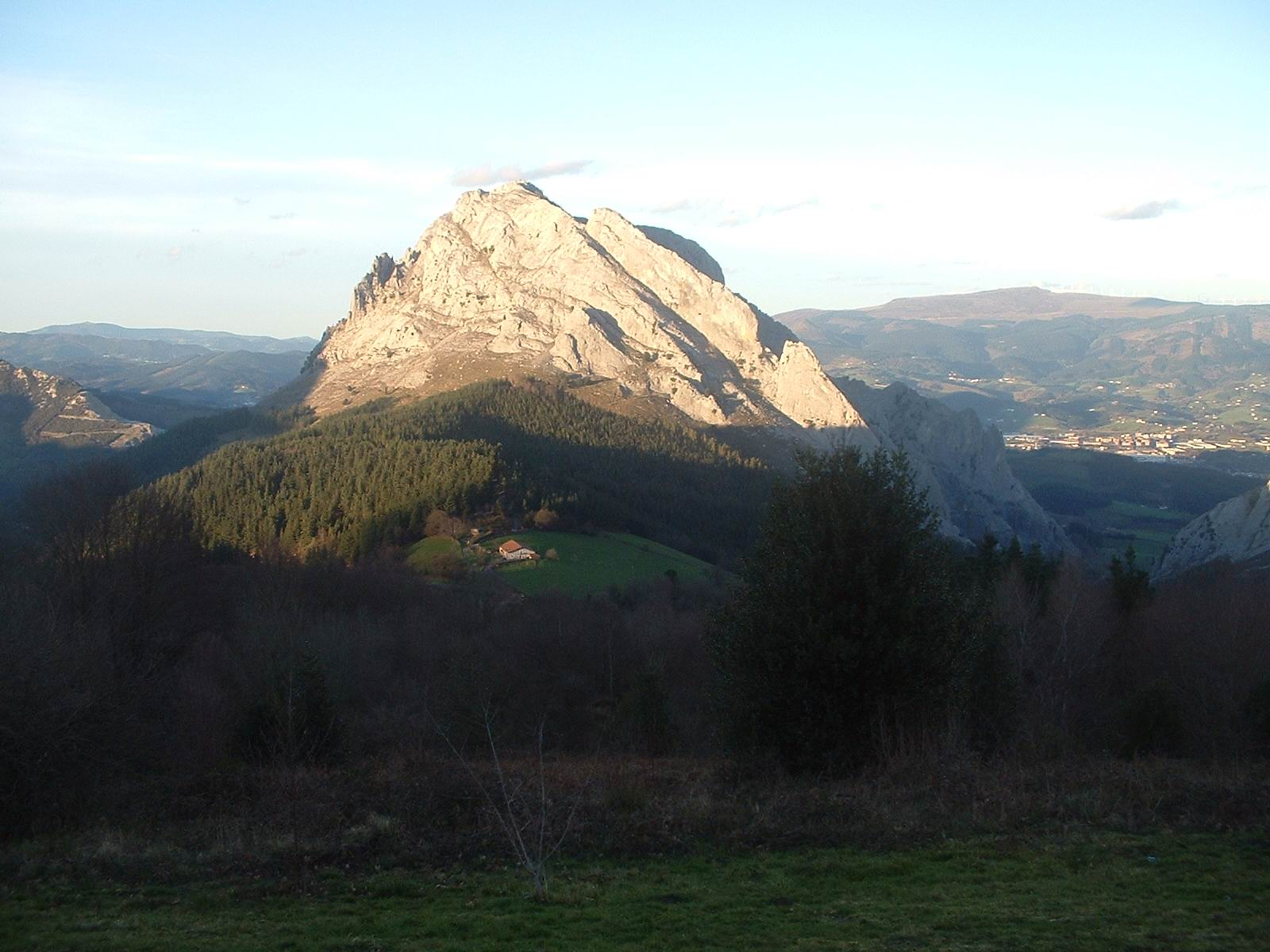
Urkiola Natural Park viewed from Abadiño

Abadiño is located on the N-636 road a few kilometres to the southeast of Durango in the province of Biscay in northern Spain. The town is in a broad valley formed by the Ibaizabal and Urkiola Rivers. Livestock farming is practised here on the flat valley floor, and to the south the land rises to form the Urkiola mountain range. The lower slopes are clad in natural woodland of oak, beech and pine, and the higher parts consist of limestone peaks with gullies, cliffs and caves and are included in the Urkiola Natural Park.

== Tourism ==
The town of Abadiño has a number of historic buildings. The Muntsaratz Tower is a good example of ninth century Renaissance architecture. The Sanctuary of San Antonio is a church inside the Urkiola Natural Park. The Astola Manor House was one of the political and administrative centres of the Merindad de Durango region. It was purchased by the Merindad in 1576 and was subsequently used as a courthouse, as the residency of the local lieutenant, as the local jail and as the district archive. The Gederiaga Complex is on a hill overlooking the town and includes the Chapel of San Salvador. This was an ancient "oath chapel" in which general assemblies of the authorities of the Merindad de Durango valley were held; there are twelve stone seats arranged in a semicircle, and nearby is a sandstone cross in the Renaissance and Gothic style dating from 1633, part of a series of crosses in the district.

There are hiking trails, mountain biking and horse riding facilities near the town. There are several festivals, the main one being that of the patron saint, Santo Domingo. This takes place on 12 May and the succeeding days and there is much music and dancing in the town. The Festival of San Blas takes place on 3 February, and at this event there is a livestock fair. Another festival, that of San Antonio, is celebrated on 13 June near his sanctuary in Urkiola.

== Notable people ==
- Athletic Bilbao players Ustaritz Aldekoaotalora and Ander Iturraspe were born in Abadiño.
