= Basque civil law =

Basque civil law is the civil law partially applicable in the Spanish or southern part of the Basque Country.

== History ==
“Flanked by three universal influent juridical systems, the Roman law, which seems to face two contradictory laws, the canonical and the civil ones; the Germanic Law, that leaks out through the Corpus Iuris cracks, and flourishes in an uncountable number of local laws, and the Islamic Law, that pretends to impose its Koran unitary rule to all abroad, the Basque people introduces us into its own juridical system developed according to the following patterns: The Private law sets the woman full capability and under all circumstances equality to man; the indivision of the Family Heritage and therefore emancipating the non inheriting offspring; as well as giving the neither cultivated nor fenced soil a ruling main character to ease the non heirs to gain their own wealth. The Public Law gives the Family house a public law entity status, so that the house chief is also the judge having jurisdiction when acting in behalf that house (etxe-jauntza); and articulating the country’s personality in the basis of the presence of all Basque Family chiefs in a Assembly, the whole country’s Assembly, without which the King’s Lord nor has rights other than his own office, neither is entitled to modify the Country’s Law. Traditionally the basque chiefs "jauntxos" were the embodiment and judges of the law. Some authors suggest modern day Public law is expressed in the Basque noun “jauntza” that in those times was far from meaning the power of the Landlord, but that every Basque individual was a Lord himself”.

== Theoretical summary and thematic development ==
1.1. Concept: According to the Dictionary of the Royal Spanish Language Academy, “Foral” is the adjective of the noun “Fuero” that in juridical English means: a) jurisdiction, which either can be classified in terms of the kind of applicable Law (i.e. Ecclesiastical, Secular, Civil, Administrative, Labour...), or under territorial criteria; b) the code of laws applicable to a case, or c) in, a territorial sense, as a Charter. We must highlight that the aforementioned dictionary's second meaning for “Fuero“ is “a historical rule or code given to a specific territory. [For example t]he fueros of Navarra and the Basque Country.”

Etymologically, fuero derives from the Latin word “”, that is the place where the court hears the causes, and not from “foedus”, also in Latin, treaty, pact or alliance, which is coherent with the historical origin of the Basque Charters as juridical corpus applicable to determine either the lawsuit itself or the competent jurisdiction to judge that lawsuit. Also merges with the historical origin of both the villages' charters and the countryside's charter.

The term chartered law was used for its real first time in a letter sent by the University of Valencia staff to the King Charles the Third, with occasion of his accession to the Throne, applying for reestablishment of the Region of Valencia Civil Charter abolished by Phillip the Fifth. Nowadays, Chartered Law means, a formal statement of the rights of a country's people both in the public and private Law areas, but sin 1759 on, the term is used in Spain to name the peculiar Civil Law of the territories that resisted the centralization politic initiated by Phillip the Fifth.

1.2. The Basque Charters: The characteristics of a juridical system: A congress held in Andorra about the Law stated that, prior to the French Revolution the Law in the northern side of the Pyrenees had many points in common with the Law in its southern side. It was deemed as proved that the Pyrenean Law is a peculiar regulation that only arbitrarily could be classified as Roman or Germanic. It is stated that the Basque Law fully adapted to the economy within, as well as to the Basque People social life. A Country of farmers and small artisans, isolated homesteads and almost domestic industries had to ensure the conservation of the Family Heritage, avoiding its division due to dire consequences. So the Biscay Charter does, permitting the testator to transfer his heritage, focused on the Homestead, either to just a single inheritor or to freely distribute it among his progeny.

As manifestations of a common background of the Basque Charters, we can identify, in the Public Law area the creation of a complete institutional and political own system based on: a) Internal free trade. b) Taxes exemption. C) Contribution to the Crown through a fiscal given. d) “Pase Foral” or non-compliance with those King's Acts in contradiction with the Charter, c) Compulsory military service exemption and f) a system of individual rights, inviolability of the domicile and prohibition of torture.

In the private law area: a) Freedom of testation (among the descendants). b) Unity and indivisibility of the Family Heritage. c) Agreement as to Succession and Marriage Contract as titles to transfer the Family Heritage, not only by means of the Roman testament. e) The marriage universal community of property and f) a concept of the property focused on the family, far from the Liberal individualist definition.

1.3. The Basque Charters, a territorial reality: Nonetheless the aforementioned common background, “It is a remarkable Basque peculiarity that the different territories considered Basque have never joint into a political unity, with the sole exception of the Reign of Sancho the Great from Navarre. Every Basque territory has lived its own History and, in spite of some similarities, with also remarkable differences, has created its own legal system. Therefore it is necessary to separately analyse the different Charters throughout every corner of the Basque Land. The essence of the Basque Law should be discovered in a later work, to try to infer, above the peculiarities, among the variety of rules and institutions all what is shared”.

== Charters of Biscay, Álava and Gipuzkoa, in particular ==
The custom is the original Basque Law, born from the free and spontaneous juridical activity of the fellow citizens, the experience and the clash of the economical interests. Its result is the sequence of charters that are “written”, that is, more than Act enactments, mere record of the precedent usages.

The most accurate juridical meaning for the word fuero is found in the first “Partida” which states: “Charter is a concept that includes two aforementioned things, custom and usage, which both must enter into the Charter to become in force. Custom as long as men must get used to and love it. The usage is like an agreement that is to be handled and observed, and if the Charter is right, made of good usages and customs, turns into Law as long as keeps humankind in peace and justice…”.

So, the point is not “a Royal enactment upon the Court or the concession by the competent authority of a Charter of establishment of a Village, but mainly the cultural fact of Law writing and the subsequent availability of knowledge, lawsuit, concession as privilege, and its value as a documentary proof mean”.

And Ana María BARRERO GARCÍA concludes: “though the observation of the data resulting from a vast number of local charters from different dates and regions, it seems that this work was characterized by its intensity and insecurity, due, no doubt, to the technical difficulties inherent to the effort of abstracting the daily activity of authorities and fellow citizens to a written regulation; to the deficiencies related to the knowledge of the usage that might pop up; or the actual being of their recording documents. It is therefore not surprising that there could be different versions of the same local Charter, all of them suitable of being acknowledged as so; hence a certain version might not be considered as the definitive one”.

=== Biscay ===
A “race” between the villages and the countryside can be observed during the low Middle Age in order to leave a written, official, testimony of their characteristic Laws.

==== Countryside ====
a) The first legal text ruling the “Merindad” (County) of Durango, Biscay, was enacted by the King of Navarre Sancho the Wise and written in a missal of the church of Saint Agustin of Echevarria approximately in 1.200 b.c. Circa 1.342 b.c. the Charter of the County of Durango was written, including the custom and usage about succession, property, Criminal law, etc., till then orally transmitted. This Charter lasted till the enforcement of the Charter of Biscay, which was not initially accepted by the people of Durango, who preserved for a while the application the aforementioned own legal text. b) The Charter of Abellaneda of 1394. The Charter of Custom and Usages in force in the County of “Las Encartaciones” was written in 1394, 58 years before the redaction of the Biscay Charter. This Encartaciones first Ordinance or Charter, edited under the impulse of the Mayor appointed by the King Gonzalo Moro, had 45 articles or epigraphers. Inspired by the Brotherhood Ordinance of Biscay, was led by a preface, changed some penalties, inserted some original provisions and added some civil regulations. d) The Old Charter of 1452. This Charter is divided into 210 chapters or norms (unnumbered, Astuy's edition aside) that rule diverse issues: The oath of the Lord, trade freedom, fiscal freedoms, process warranties, etc. as well as a vast number of civil provisions. In 1506-02-11, by means of the Mayor appointed by the King Vázquez de Acuña application, a revision of some regulation was held, the most interesting one, the provision, in order to avoid the application of Roman or Canonical sources in the interpretation of the Biscayan Law, the latter literal interpretation. e) The Charter of the Encartaciones in 1503 includes 111 chapters or provisions. The last 38 ones are the Common Law charter, mainly Civil Law. The text also comprehends the Neighbours' Charter applicable on Salcedo and Gordejuela valleys. f) The New Charter of 1526 includes 36 epigraphs divided into an unbalanced number of norms. It is an incomplete text since its ignores many institutions, something logical in some cases due to the subsidiary enforcement of the Law of Castile, but not about some Biscayan deep-rooted customs, specifically in the Public Law area, where, as a matter of fact, it is remarkable the absence of any regulation about the notification and functioning of the Biscay County Assembly. However, the Charter rules the utmost important institutions, and mainly, the essential freedoms that constitute the Charter regulation.

==== The villages vs. the countryside of Biscay ====
As in the rest of territories of the Iberic peninsula, the need to use legal texts reflecting their own Law, prompted the achievement of the first results in urban areas, either in the Encartaciones, Biscay or Durango, before these Counties’ Countryside did. The aforementioned urban Charters, basically imitated Logroño's one. The Villages were established from 1199 on: Balmaseda, Orduña (1229); Bermeo (1236); Lanestosa (1287); Plencia/Gaminiz (1299); Bilbao (1300); Ochandiano (1304); Portugalete (1322); equeitio (1325); Ondárroa (1327); Villaro (1338); Marquina (1355); Elorrio (1356); Guernica y Guerricaiz (1366); Miravalles/Ugao (1375). The last three ones were established upon Biscayan people's request to defend themselves from the Gang Wars: Munguía, Larrabezúa and Rigoitia in 1376. The Villages of Durango and Ermua, established in 1212, enacted their Charter in 1372.

The agreement of 1630 between the Villages and the Countryside :

The demarcation of the territories where the Charter of Biscay is in force is they key and most difficult question due to the historical evolution of the Villages and the Countryside and the complexity of identifying their corresponding areas.

In opposition to the general enforcement of the Public Law to any Biscayan individual, the Biscayan Civil Law was not overall in force: The universal yeomanly status, i.e., was applicable to any Biscayan person; no matter his domicile were the Villages or the Countryside. In the other hand, the Family and Inheritance provisions are only in force in the Countryside, also called Yeoman Land.

The villages where the Spanish Civil Code is nowadays in force are: Bermeo, Durango, Ermua, Guernica y Luno, Lanestosa, Lequeitio, Marquina, Ochandiano, Ondárroa, Portugalete, Plencia y Valmaseda, the City of Orduña and all the Municipality of Bilbao. The 1630 Agreement, which enabled the Villages to change to the Charter of Biscay in their territory, was adopted by Elorrio (1712), Bermeo (1734), Ochandiano (1818) and Villaro (1825).

==== Some public law hints ====
The “Juntas Generales de Bizkaia” (Biscay County Assembly) was the legislative power; whereas the executive power was held by the “Diputación” (County council, formerly, “Regimiento”). There was an own Supreme Court of Appeal, a special section of the Royal Chancellor in Valladolid.

=== Alava ===
The Charter of Alava can be traced back to the 1322 agreement between the King of Castile and the County of Alava, which incorporated the latter to the Crown of Castile as both a Crown and Manor property; and conceded the yeomen –not the servants- overall Tax exemption. The County of Alava is established in 1417 after the gradual incorporation of seven areas. Different Ordinances were enacted throughout time, among which, stands out the Ordinance by the Rivabellosa Assembly, approving a very important Compilation in terms of assessing the Charter institutions. After the enactment of the Royal Statute and the Ordinance of Alcala (1348) the Castilian Law, a marginal acceptance of the local custom aside, became in force in Alava. This is the reason why Alava does not have its own Civil Law, with the exception of the Ayala Valley, and the municipalities of Llodio and Aramayona, where the Charter of Biscay is in force.

Within the circumscription of Alava, the Valley of Ayala is a land limiting northwards with Biscay and southwards with the Losa Valley, Burgos province. The Valley of Ayala is mentioned as “property of their inhabitants” in the Salmantinian Chronicle (9th century). Time after that valley became a Manor of the Counts of Ayala: “the Manor of Ayala, according with its 1373 Charter, is like the Manor of Biscay, as they are twinned”. In 1463 Ayala merged with the County of Alava but preserved its own authorities and courts. The 1373 Charter, enacted by the Count Fernán Pérez de Ayala, in a meeting with the five Town Mayors of the County of Saraube, was a compilation of customs and usage. It is divided into 95 chapters, 15 of which (according to Galíndez) were directly copied from the Royal Statute, whilst the rest of them comprehend the County of Ayala usage, and among which the chapter XXVIII states the utmost testamentary freedom. In 1469-06-24, García II of Ayala enacted an extension of the Charter with 16 additional provisions, mainly focused against the Gang Wars, therefore not very interesting under the Civil Law point of view.

In 1487 the people of Ayala, already part of Alava, since its unwritten Charters were considered prone to many mistakes, agreed with Don Pedro López de Ayala the renouncement to the antique laws and the adoption of the Royal Statute, Laws of Partida, and Royal Ordinance, “except for the inheritances and successions of every citizen of the aforementioned land, so that they are entitled to testate, legate or donate, any or all their assets to anyone, separating their sons and relatives, at will. Also, nor citizen, neither foreigner shall be imprisoned in these land for debts, debts to Kings or the Lord aside, since so long it was the usage in the past …”

In political terms, the Basic institution is the “Juntas Generales” (County Assembly) that appointed a “Diputado General” (County Major Councillor), the top rank within the province, as well as appointed the Particular Council, formed by seven members each appointed by one zone. The Authority was the “Diputación” (County Council, formerly, “Regimiento”).

=== Gipuzkoa ===
The Charter institutions can be traced back to the County Ordinances, 1397, which established among the municipalities of Gipuzkoa an alliance or brotherhood, that long lasted and evolved into a permanent institution. Originally this alliance had both a judicial and security focus. That is, the allied municipalities decided that they could more easily defeat the local landlord's gangs if joint.

However, as time past, this association enabled other powers such as government, taxes, military and legislative. Therefore, the last General Brotherhood of Gipuzkoa turned into the most important political and judicial organ within its territory.

Gipuzkoa was ruled by a Compilation edited in Tolosa in 1583, corrected and augmented due to the province's request in 1692 and printed in 1696 under the title “New compilation of the Charters, Privileges, good usages an customs, provisions and ordinances of the very noble an loyal Province of Guipuzcoa”. The County Assembly, composed of 57 members, chosen by the 57 City Mayors, met every July to write the new regulation demanded by the public interest. Before leaving the annual meeting, they delegated their powers to four “Diputados Generales” (County Mayor Councillors) elected among the people of the cities of San Sebastián, Tolosa, Azpeitia and Azcoitia. The County Major Councillor of the township in which the Major Appointed by the King resided that year, altogether with his adjutant and the two local first councillors, formed the Ordinary County Council, competent to deal with non extremely important issues. For the latter, and anyway twice a year, the Extraordinary County Council, formed by the four Major County Councillors, should be called.

The Charter of Gipuzkoa does not include civil regulation, pastures (epigraph XL) and distances between plantations (epigraph XXXVIII) provisions aside. After the incorporation into Castile, the lack of written regulations prompted the jurisdictional application of the Royal Statute and the Castile Law, although the customs about succession and Family survived. It is however notorious the nowadays subsistence of those family and inheritance usages in many ways similar to those in Biscay; and in fact, the County Assembly failed to exit from the Regulation of Castile in 1555, 1587, 1659, 1671, 1673, 1712, 1747.

Consequently, the Civil Code is nowadays in force in Gipuzkoa, although in the rural areas the usages preserving the unity and indivisibility of the Homestead are observed by the families: Family Patrimony unity, Family assets Communal Tenancy, Dowry, etc.

The most important political organ in Gipuzkoa, as well as in Biscay and Alava, was the County Assembly, that ordinary met every July the 2nd. The Mayor Appointed by the King, or supreme Magistrate, was the President of both the County Council and the County Assembly and, although, had no voting right, was elected by the fellow citizens and had to reside for three years in the aforementioned towns.

== Modern Age ==
The Spaniard King Phillip V by means of the New Jurisdictional Decrees abolished the main part of both Public Law institutions and sources in the Spanish territories of Aragon, Valencia, Catalonia and the Balearic Islands. However, the application of their own Civil Law remained, but corseted, due to the aforementioned deletion of their own sources of law. Navarre and the Basque Country did not share the same fate, since these territories were loyal to that Monarch, appointed by Charles II's testament as the successor in the Crown, in opposition to the Charter Institutions of the other four territories referred to, who proclaimed the Archduke Charles of Austria as the King of Spain, a Monarch imposed by international treaties against that will.

== The Spanish Codification ==
The 1812 Spanish Constitution settled the principle of National Sovereignty and the corollary of the latter was the unification of both Jurisdiction and Law due to a proposal by Espiga y Gadea: “The Civil, Criminal and Commerce Codes will be the only ones for all the Kingdom, notwithstanding the variations that under particular circumstances may the Parliament introduce”, and hence this last sentence gave the Charters a chance of survival.

The instability, first due to the War of Independence, later due to the Ferdinand VII’s political turns, and after his death, the Carlist Wars, delayed the Codification till the establishment of a General Coding Commission, which in 1846 finished the utmost important project preceding the today in force Civil Code.

The first consequence of the Carlist War was the abolition of the Charter Regime by means of the substitution of the County Council by the Province Council (1836) and the gradual suppression of the Charter Jurisdictional system through the introduction of the Magistrate and the Court of Appeal (1835). General Espartero, in the “Hug at Vergara” promised the preservation of the Charters, and consequently, the 1839-10-25 Act states “The confirmation of Charters of the Basque Provinces and Navarre, notwithstanding the constitutional unity of the Crown”. Apparently, the Charters were safe, but the constitutional unity salvo enabled the suppression of the most characteristic institutions, if discordant with the Constitution. The 2nd article of the Act stated: “The Government shall propose to the Parliament the indispensable modification on the aforementioned Charters demanded by the Provinces interest, reconciled with the general interest”.

The 1851 Civil Code Project, also known as the García Goyena´s Project, is part of this spirit. Both based on the Napoleon Code and the Spanish Law essence and tradition, derogated previous Charters, custom and usages in force, but its radical suppression of any Charter, eventually resulted in its rejection and non enactment.

This made the representatives of the territories which had a historically rooted Civil Law, raise their voices defending their Laws. We observe two faced positions, those who thought that the juridical unification was to succeed through the construction of a rational law (in the Illustration sense of term) that ought to be enacted by means of a common Code for the entire Nation; and those who wanted to preserve the historical Law of the former Kingdoms. There was also a more radical view, consisting on the unification through the extension and depuration of the Castilian Law, the old Royal Law transmuted into National Law.

The 1863 National Jurists Congress agreed the solution that in the end succeeded: The Civil Code, once enacted, should be in force in all Spain for just marriage and Title I related subjects only. For the very rest, those provinces or territories with surviving Charters should retain their own written or custom Law, notwithstanding the enactment of the Civil Code, merely subsidiary.

In the meantime the failure of the 1851 Project, turned into the enactment of urgently needed special Acts, such as the Mortgage Act (1861), Notary Act (1863), Water Act (1886), Civil Marriage and Civil Register Act (1870), in force in all Spain.

In 1880 the codification wish resurges, by means of creating a unique Civil Code based on the regimes of those regions with their own Civil Law, extracting the most peculiar institutions from each one. Therefore, some representatives from the Chartered Regions were included in the Codification Commission, but in the end no result was achieved.

Thus, the 1889 Civil Code inherited that idea, included in the Basis of the Civil Code Act of 1888, that the former shall compile the essential content of the Law then in force, and subsequently its successive appendixes –also enacted by the Parliament- shall annex the different Charters (#6). This system only succeeded in the case of the Civil Charter of Aragon, the 1923 Appendix, enacted in 1925 and in force in 1931. Consequently, the Decree 1889-04-17 ordered the Government to nominate the Special Commissions to deal with such a task, and another Decree in 24-04-1889 erected the Special Commission to draft the Civil Charters of Biscay and Alava. In 1900-02-09 this Commission held its last session and considered its task fulfilled.

The Special Codification Commission for Biscay, presided by Mr. Manuel Lecanda, had six members, three appointed by the County Council of Biscay, one by the Bar Association, and one by the Burgos Notary Association. Later, by means of the Decree 1899-05-15 three additional members from Alava entered the commission. This first Civil Code Appendix draft was never enacted.

Although the commission drafted its famous Project in 1900, it remained halted till 1928 when the Bar Association of Biscay produced a report about the former including some changes, but no further achievements succeeded. The Bar Association of Alava also reported about Ayala in 1930. Non of them were successful by that time.

The Basque Studies Society in behalf of Gipuzkoa applied for the writing of the usages in 1918 and 1930, with no result. Nevertheless, with increasing difficulties, the people from Gipuzkoa observed its customs, located in the rural areas.

== Compilation ==
The summarizing of the Civil Law Charters was halted till the National Civil Law Congress held in Zaragoza from 1946-10-09 to 1946-10-03, which revived the old idea of a general Civil Code, which shall systematize the historical institutions of every Territory, balance their enforcement and practice with present days needs, adapt them to the Civil Code system and avoid coincidences and repetitions. The suggestion was adopted by the Decree 1947-05-23, and thus, Commissions were appointed for Aragon, Catalonia, Balearic Islands, Galicia, Alava and Biscay (Order 1947-06-24) . The Compilations enacted as the result of the Zaragoza initiative were: Biscay and Alava (1959-07-30 Act); Catalonia (1960-07-21 Act); Balearic Islands (1967-04-19 Act), and Navarre (1973-03-01 Act).

In order to complete the Commission of Jurist created, the Decree 1953-10-23 of the General Codification Commission, ordered the incorporation of Charter supporter members to assess the Compilations and to raise to the Government the project drafts. The Commission created a special section under the former presidency integrated by two Charter supporters from Biscay and Alava and by representatives of the First Section in order to draft a Project, based on the Biscayan Bar Association report dated in 1928.

The 32/1959-07-30 Act, the Compilation of Civil Law Charter of Biscay and Alava was the summit of that task. It is divided in two books, respectively focused on the general regulation in force in Biscay and Alava. The Second Book, dedicated to the latter province has two titles, first and second, related to the demarcation of the Civil Law in Llodio/Laudio and Aramaio (with express submission to the Biscayan Law) and the Civil Law of the Ayala Valley.

== The Spanish 1978 Constitution and the Statute of Autonomy of Euskadi/Basque Country ==
As Democracy came to Spain, the 1978 Constitution opened a new way for the Charters, from then on autonomic Civil Laws, greatly empowered by means of #149.1.8º, which prompted the revision of the Compilations, both in terms of politics, since it will come from the regional parliaments, and in terms of contents, as entitled not only to preserve, but to modify and develop their Civil Law. The nowadays in force Organic Act 1979-12-18, the Statute of Autonomy of the Basque Country, extends those autonomic powers (#10.5) both to written or custom Law, and sets its demarcation.

According with those powers, the Basque Parliament Act 6/1998 modified the Compilation and stated, in accordance with the traditional civil liberty that inspires the Charter system, the freedom to agree or to modify the Marriage Property Regime, before or after the wedding. It also removed any discrimination between legitimate and illegitimate children.

== The (Basque Parliament) Act 3/1992, 1992-07-01, Basque Civil Law Charter ==
The Compilation was derogated and substituted by the Basque Parliament Act 3/1992, 1992-07-01, Basque Civil Law Charter (BCLC, from now on). It was completed with the (Basque Parliament) Charter of Gipuzkoa Act 3/1999 focused on the Homestead succession in that territory.

The background of that renovation is the Civil Law Congress held in San Sebastian in 1981, which highlighted the Doctrine confusion about an eventual renovation of the Charter. A Seminar organized within the Biscayan commission of the Basque Royal Society of the Friends of the Country resulted in great interest and the flourishing of a bunch of jurist eager for the Basque Civil Law Charter.

Between the mid and the final 80's several Civil Law Charter projects were drafted. Among them, we must highlight, due its exhaustiveness and the subsequent influence in the later initiative of the County Council of Biscay, the Civil Law Charter of Biscay project written by the Basque Royal Society of the Friends of the Country, the Reform of the Compilation for Biscay and Alava draft by the Notary Bar Association of Bilbao and the Civil Law Charter of Biscay draft by the lawyer and Biscayan Law studious from Gernika Mr. Julián Arzanegui Sarricolea.

Immediately after the San Sebastian Congress, the Works towards the Compilation reform started, including a draft presented to de County Council of Biscay. Following this trail, from 10 to 12, December 1986, a Seminar about the up to date of Civil Law of Biscay was held in Bilbao, revealing major advances on our Civil Law Charter knowledge.

The Civil Law Charter Commission appointed by the County Council of Biscay adopted in 1991 a text and sent a copy to the County Council of Alava, which also nominated a Commission to write the Charter Civil Law of Alava. The County Assembly of Alava approved an Act proposal sent to the Basque Parliament, simply adopting its Commission proposal.

Thus, a Common Act for the three Historical Territories of the Basque Autonomic Community was enacted, with a preliminary Title about the sources of law, and three Books (I, Charter of Biscay, the Villages vs. Countryside duality included; II, Charter of Alava, regulating the essence of the Charter of the Ayala Valley; and III, Charter of Gipuzkoa, a mere reference to some customs).

The President of the Government appealed upon the Constitutional Court against some of the Act articles, but after a Council of State report, the Government desisted such appeal.

Finally, the Act 3/1999 modified the Basque Civil Law Act in terms of introducing the Homestead regulation as a farm.

== The Basque Law Academy ==
The Basque Law Academy (Zuzenbidearen Euskal Akademia in Basque language –BLA, from now on-) was erected due to a proposal in an Extraordinary Assembly of the Basque Royal Society of the Friends of the Country (the original core of the BLA) in 2002-11-29.

It is a private organization with about 200 associated jurists from the professional and University sectors, under Mr. Adrián Celaya Ibarra presidency. The BLA is formed by truly Law operators: Lawyers; Civil Servants from administration such as Fiscal, Basque Parliament; Magistrates; Notaries, Registrars, etc. who usually face the Law issues; as well as University members. A result, the magazine “JADO” publishes valuable articles that dip into the Basque Law knowledge as an instrument to serve the civil society, not as goal itself.

There are four main activity lines:

1. Regulation proposals:

Three progressive attempts to renew the Basque Civil Law: A Basque Civil Law draft in 2001, a second one in 2007 and the Civil Law Proposal of 2012, (http://www.forulege.com/dokumentuak/legeria/05_Propuesta_de_Ley_Civil_Vasca.pdf), in cooperation with the Biscay Bar Association.

2. Publications:

Nowadays BLA edits several publications, mostly about the Charter Civil Law, such as JADO the magazine, both in paper and in the internet (http://www.avd-zea.com/castellano/el_boletin.php); and the Basque Law Classic Collection (“Euskal Zuzenbidearen Klasikoak Bilduma”).

3. Documentation:

The Basque Civil Law Data base (“Forulege” Forulege - web de Derecho civil Vasco de la academia Vasca de Derecho), developed by BLA, supplies the user in force regulations, jurisprudence, bibliography and patterns that may be useful in Basque Civil Law. The Data Base also offers FAQ so that the reader gets a glimpse about what the Basque Civil Law is and what it means. Finally it is possible to access to all the information compiled in the different sections due to various searching system: a free search system, a fast search system, a guided search system, according with the territorial specialities; either in Fiscal and Civil Law.

4. Training & divulgation:

Classical monthly meetings are held in cooperation with the Bar Association of Biscay to study any Basque Civil Law issue and its practical use. Every November there is a Basque Civil Law Charter seminar with many lecturers either from Spain or abroad.

== The New Basque Civil Regulation ==
It is integrated, mainly, with subsidiary remission to general Spanish civil la (art. 3 Law 3/205), by the former, the Law 2/2003 of unmarried couples, and finally the Law 7/2015, for familiar relations in case of separation or parents split.

== The Law 5/2015, of 25 of June, of Basque Civil Law ==
The Basque Law Academy/Zuzenbidearen Euskal Akademia and the Basque Civil Law Studies Group of the Biscayan Bar Association have been lastingly cooperating in the progress and development of the Basque Civil Law by means of different initiatives, such as the annual Seminar or several publications. Due to these efforts, the Basque Parliament adopted such a Proposal as the basis of the present Law, leaving partisanship aside.

The main milestones are:

1. The term “Basque Civil Act” or “Basque Civil Law”, as a noun revealing the truly Basque roots and the fact that is applicable on all the Basque Autonomic Community.

2. The Basque Civil sources of law are preserved (#1–4) and the Basque Civil Law Principles are enunciated (#5–7).

3. The Basque Civil Law demarcation: The Basque civil-residence and its overall application to all the Basque Autonomic Community (#8–11), notwithstanding the local specially mentioned specialities.

The provisions applicable to the Basque civil-residents, in all the Basque Autonomic Community territory are: A) Joint Testament; B) Power of Appointment; C) Forced Succession (Forced Heirship, Separation); D) Intestate Succession; E) Agreement as to Succession; F) Property and succession regimes of unmarried couples; G) Rustic Lease; H) Easements and I) an opening to the traditional Basque associative World, by means of acknowledgment of the Brotherhoods and Mutualities.

The Biscayan local civil residence (applicable in the Biscayan Countryside, Llodio and Aramayona) enables the universal community marriage property regime as well as imposes the Real Estate Trunk Lineage Statute.

The Ayalesian local residence preserves the freedom of testation and the Powerful Usufruct.

The Gipuzkoan local civil residence goes on with the Homestead succession regime.

4. Succession content: A) A variety of compatible succession titles, including the three Basque Civil Law classics: Testamentary (widening the joint testament to whom living together), Intestate and Agreement as to Succession (#18). B) Settlement of an inheritors calling mechanism, especially in the event of a Power of Appointment (the representative has some disposition capabilities on the inheritance), with remission to the moment of its exercise (#17). C) Regulation of the Heir and Legatee Status, including presumptions of the Heir Status of certain Legatees (# 19 & 20). D) A definition of the Inheritance debts, which includes the maintenance payable to the deceased's descendants; and the establishment of a responsibility for the inheritance debts limited to the value, in the moment of the call to the successor, of de assets acquired (#21). A system for separating the inherintace's and the heirs' own goods and debts. E) The forced succession regulation is extended to all the Basque Autonomic Community and the forced portion reduced to 1/3 of the patrimony net value (#49). Ancestors are excluded from forced succession (#47). F) The traditional widow allowance is extended with a Right of habitation in the spouses’ home during widowhood. G) The intestate succession provisions splits between Trunk Lineage Statutory assets and the rest of the deceased's patrimony (#111 & 112). This intestate succession passes by right of representation to the issue of a deceased's beneficiary (#113 & 116.2). In non Trunk real state the subsequent intestate successors are: The descendants, the widow/er (#114), ascendants (#115), collateral ancestors (#116), and if there is no surviving person within the Basque Community Administration escheats the assets as a trustee to pass to herself, to the County Council of the deceased's last residence and to the municipality of the latter last residence, by third parts and by means of benefit of inventory. Therefore, an overall intestate succession system is generated to any Basque Community civil residents. H) Reservations and Recessions .

5. The Trunk Lineage Statute is a family institution (#61) based on both the lineage of the previous proprietors (#62, 66 & 67) and the Real Estate (#62). The provisions include general effects and extinction (#68 & 69), as well as the coordination with succession (#70 & 71). The general effects of Trunk Lineage Statute are that Trunk relatives may sue for the invalidation (4 years expiration term) of any act of disposition breaching the trunk statute, either gratis, inter vivo, causa mortis (#69). The emption rights are not nor applicable to estate on urban and developable land areas (#74), neither the 4th degree collateral ancestors are entitled thereof (#72). In general, the Law 3/1992 main lines are followed, although some precisions are introduce in terms of the effects of the emption rights execution, their pre-emptive effects even over the registered third parties (#87).

6. The Marriage Property Regime is based on the freedom of contract (#125) and two subsidiary regulations according to the conflict-of-laws rules: The General Spanish conjugal partnership of gains applicable to the General Law Biscayans (#127.1), and the universal community of property to Biscayan local civil residents (#127.2 & 127.3). The registration of the marriage property regime is compulsory to achieve opposable effects versus third parties (#128), as well its modification by means of Marriage Contracts (#126). Separation of property is the subsidiary regime for unmarried couples.

The Biscayan universal community of property provisions demark the assets and rights, burdens and debts within, and the acts of disposition that a spouse can make on his own. The confession of the private conditions of certain real estates is also accepted, if properly registered.

7.- The unmarried couples Law 2/2003 is actualized in terms of its application to couples in which, at least one of the members has Basque civil-residence, and in terms of stating, that unless other patrimonial regime is agreed within the couple, the Spanish Civil Code separation economical regime will be en force.

== Law 2/2003, of 7 of May, for unmarried couples ==
The Basque Civil Law has a scattered and imprecise regulation about this subject, due to its strong political inspiration and lack of juridical meditation by technicians.

The first hindrance is the unmarried couple definition, since there are at least three different kinds in the Basque Autonomic Community Regulation: 1. Those erected under the 2/2003 Unmarried Couples Act. 2. The “Co-living Unities” referred to in the 2/2008 Family Mediation Act as “people linked by means a permanent relationship similar to marriage”, which must be trustworthy proved for juridical issues, and 3. The rest of the unmarried couples.

Only the unmarried couples settled by means of registration in the ad hoc Basque Administration's Register are subject to Succession and Marriage Property provisions. This category's regulation will be summarized later.

The overall rest of unmarried couples, according to jurisprudence, have nothing to be with marriage, and therefore, there is no analogical application of the marriage regulation, since as, a de facto situation, notwithstanding rated as Family institutions, if two people are not willing to marry, they neither are willing to the marriage effects, specially after the enacting of the homosexual marriage and free divorce.

The aforementioned regulation consists on: (#5) the personal relationship of the unmarried couple itself and the Property Regime, including some general terms and conditions about the latter (#6), although there is no such a general statute; Children shelter (#7); adoption (#8) and a succession regime fully equivalent to married couples if subject to the Charter of Biscay (#9).

== Law 7/2015, for familiar relations in case of separation or parents split ==
Due to popular law making initiative on 12 April 2011, KIDETZA, Basque separated parents federation, filed upon the President of the Basque Parliament, the compulsory signatures that eventually became the Law/2015, for familiar relations in case of separation or parents split, best known as “shared parental custody law”.

The law's main goal is to defend the utmost interest of the children when their parents split, as well as to promote equality, according with the following milestones:

1.- Parental co responsibility. That grants both members of the couple to equal participate in their children's care and education and decisions to be made.

2.- The people not in full age are entitled to ask for shared parental custody. The children's right to live and grow with both parents after the former split, a living shared custody system, whereas any of the parents demand so, and unless that may be harmful for the child's interest.

3.- The nonage person is entitled to regularly connect with the non custodial parent, and with both parents' external families.

4.- Equality between men and women. To promote that relationships between men and women vary according to their children, during and after the couple split, are based on dialogue, mutual respect and equality.
