= Argiñeta Necropolis =

Medieval cemetery in Elorrio, Spain

Necropolis of Argiñeta
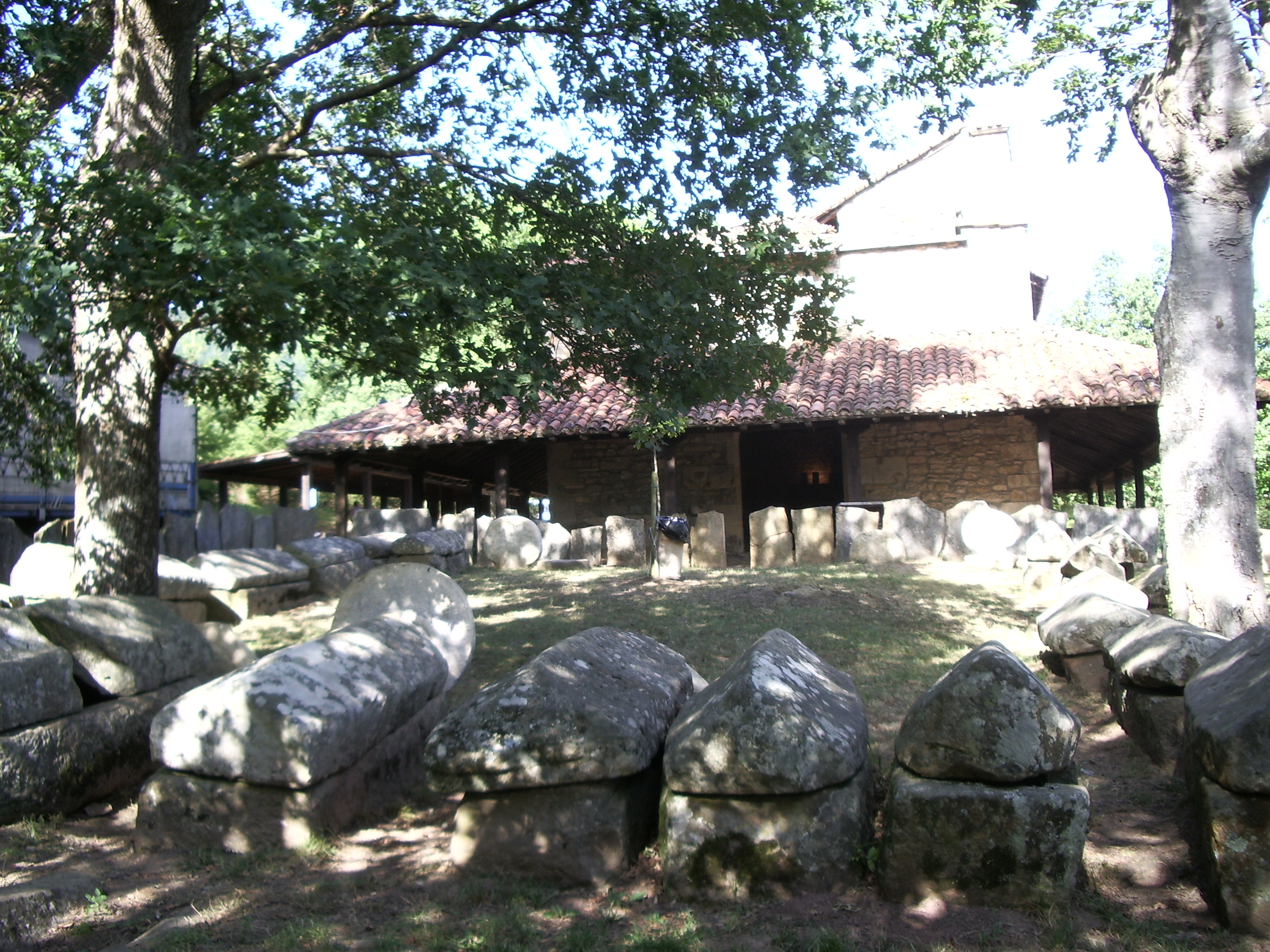
- A picture of the graves with the Hermitage of San Adrian in the background

- Location within Spain
- 43.1399°N 2.5359°W
- Type: Necropolis
- Periods: Middle Ages
- Location: Elorrio, Biscay, Basque Country, Spain

Spanish Cultural Heritage
- Designated: 1931

The Necropolis of Argiñeta is a medieval cemetery located in Elorrio, Biscay, Basque Country, Spain. The site is connected to the Hermitage of San Adrian, a building believed to have been for Christian worship. The pieces of this necropolis are considered some of the earliest examples of Visigoth and Christian presence in the Basque Country. This site was added to Spain's cultural heritage register in 1931 (Bien de Interés Cultural).

During the Middle Ages, the necropolis functioned as one of several others in the Duranguesado vicinity. During the late 19th century, nearby graves, in similar locations, were all centralized and moved to this location.

== Description ==
The cemetery consists of 20 tombs dug out of stone, called sepulchers. There are also five stelas, acting as gravestones. Every object within the cemetery is carved from sandstone quarried in the Oiz Mountains. The individuals buried in these graves were likely from the upper class, as lower-class Pyrenean communities typically used simple open-earth burials. The sepulchers consist of two pieces. The first being the actual container for the deceased, which is anthropomorphically shaped. The second is the top of the container, shaped as a rounded triangular prism. One of the sarcophagi contains two inscriptions and is double the size, likely for a married couple. Four of the stelas feature a discoid shape, while the fifth is shaped more as a triangle. The discoid stelas are notable for their prominent oval heads, supported by slender necks that emphasize their distinctively human-like characteristics (de Buruaga Blázquez).

== Visigothic influence ==
Across the Iberian Peninsula there are many cemetery sites containing similar sepulchers and stelas. Visigothic sites and cemeteries are abundant across Spain, reflecting the historical presence and influence of the Visigoths in the region. Spain was a secondary state for the Visigothic Kingdom which initially established their capital in France in the 5th century. However, penetrating into the Basque Country posed challenges for them (Álvarez-Busto). While they didn't establish long-term rule in the area, their presence left a significant mark, notably in the form of sepulchers and stelas, showcasing the enduring impact of their culture and practices on the region (Wood). One feature common in many of the necropolises throughout the Iberian Peninsula is the limestone (Camino). For example, at Los Villaricos in southern Spain, on the opposite side of the country, a Visigothic sarcophagus was discovered dated to the same period as the Necropolis of Argiñeta (Davis-Marks). Not only do the sepulchers feature a triangular shape, but also feature similar concentric geometric patterns. Along with the design of the coffins, both burial sites feature prominent Christian imagery (de Buruaga Blázquez). After King Reccared I converted to Christianity, as the Visigothic Kingdom moved into the Iberian Peninsula, Christians quickly became the majority until the 9th Century when the Moors invaded (López). This Christian imagery provides key insight into which groups were present in certain areas during certain periods. The Moors also had trouble invading the Basque Country shows which cultures were being used during pre and early Muslim control in northeast Spain.

== Bibliography ==
- Álvarez-Busto, A. G.; Sánchez-Pardo, J. C. (2021). "Cemeteries and State Formation in the Early-Medieval Northwestern Iberian Peninsula". Medieval Archaeology. 65 (1): 1–29. doi:10.1080/00766097.2021.1923895.
- Basque Government (November 27, 2006). "Cultural Heritage: Necropolis of Argiñeta". Tourism Euskadi - Tourism in the Basque Country.
- Camino, I. G. (2001). "La aportación de la arqueología al estudio del tránsito entre la antigüedad y el medievo en Bizkaia". Arqueología y territorio medieval. 8: 97–112. doi:10.17561/aytm.v8i0.1675.
- de Buruaga Blázquez, A. S. (1998). "Estelas discoideas indígenas y de tradición indígena de San Andrés de Argote". Sancho el sabio: Revista de cultura e investigación vasca. 9: 137–154.
- Davis-Marks, Isis (July 28, 2021). "Well-preserved visigoth sarcophagus found at Roman villa in Spain". Smithsonian.com.
- Leitão, Francisco (2012). "The Visigothic Society and Its Cemeteries". Revista de História da Sociedade e da Cultura. 12: 9–24. doi:10.14195/1645-2259_12_1.
- Murphy, Ed (February 7, 2010). "Hadrian's Hermitage and the Necropolis of Argiñeta". Harvard Blogs.
- "Necropolis of Argiñeta" (PDF). Elorrio Tourism. October 28, 2022.
- "Necropolis of Argiñeta". Elorrio Tourism. May 24, 2023.
- Wood, J.; Martínez Jiménez, J. (2016). "New Directions in the study of Visigothic Spain". History Compass. 14 (1): 29–38. doi:10.1111/HIC3.12294 – via Academia.edu.
- López, G. R (1999). "The Transformation and Process of Acculturation in Late Antique Hispania: Select Aspects from Urban and Rural Archaeological Documentation". The Visigoths. The Medieval Mediterranean. Vol. 20. Brill. pp. 263–302. doi:10.1163/9789004474581_012. ISBN 9789004474581.
