= Zaldibar =

- Municipality
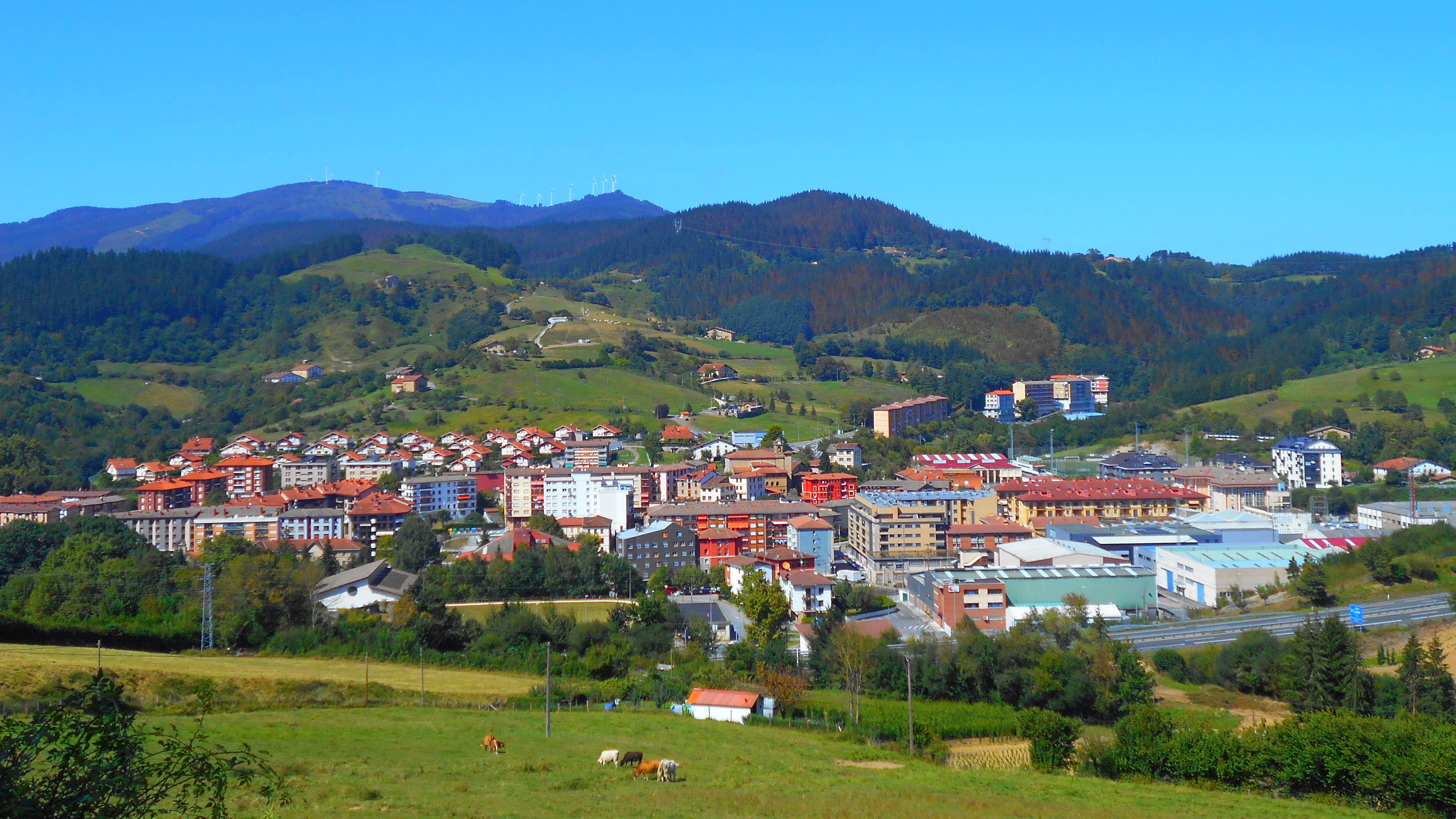
- Zaldibar overview

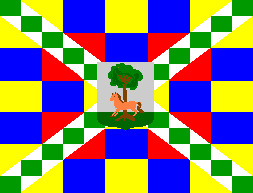
- Flag Coat of arms

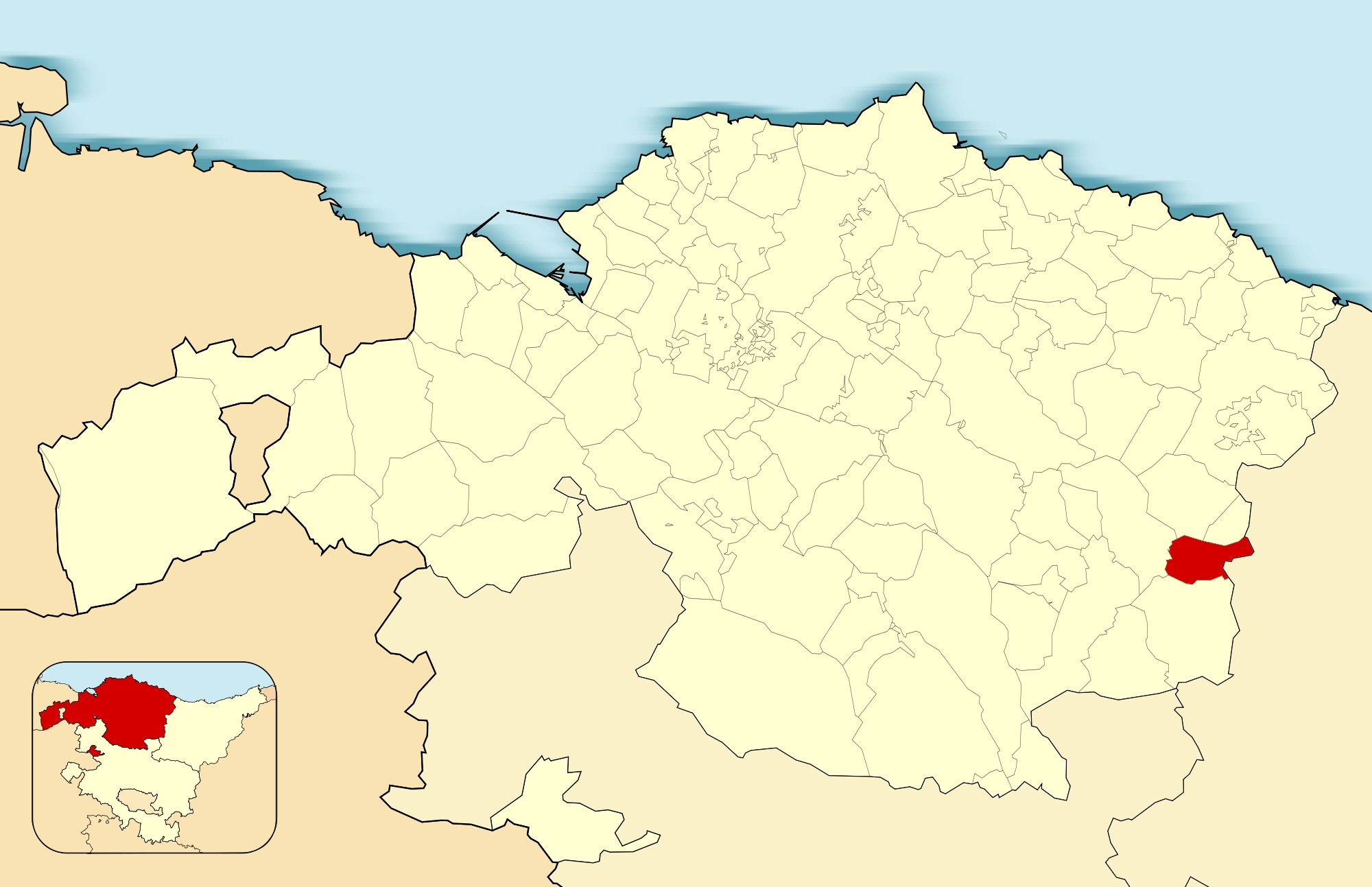
- Location of Zaldibar in Biscay

- Location in Spain Zaldibar (Spain)
- Coordinates: 43°10′21″N 2°32′43″W
- Country: Spain
- Autonomous community: Basque Country
- Province: Biscay
- Comarca: Durangaldea
- Established: Not known

Government
  - Mayor: Arantza Baigorri (EH Bildu)

Area
  - Total: 11.84 km^{2} (4.57 sq mi)
- Elevation: 195 m (640 ft)

Population (2025-01-01)
  - Total: 3,066
  - Density: 259.0/km^{2} (670.7/sq mi)
- Demonym: Zaldibartar
- Time zone: UTC+1 (CET)
  - Summer (DST): UTC+2 (CEST)
- Postal code: 48250
- Website: Official website

Zaldibar (Spanish: Zaldívar) is an elizate, town and municipality located in the province of Biscay, in the Basque Country, Spain. Zaldibar is part of the comarca of Durangaldea and has a population of 3,043 inhabitants as of 2019 and according to the Spanish National Statistics Institute.

== Etymology ==
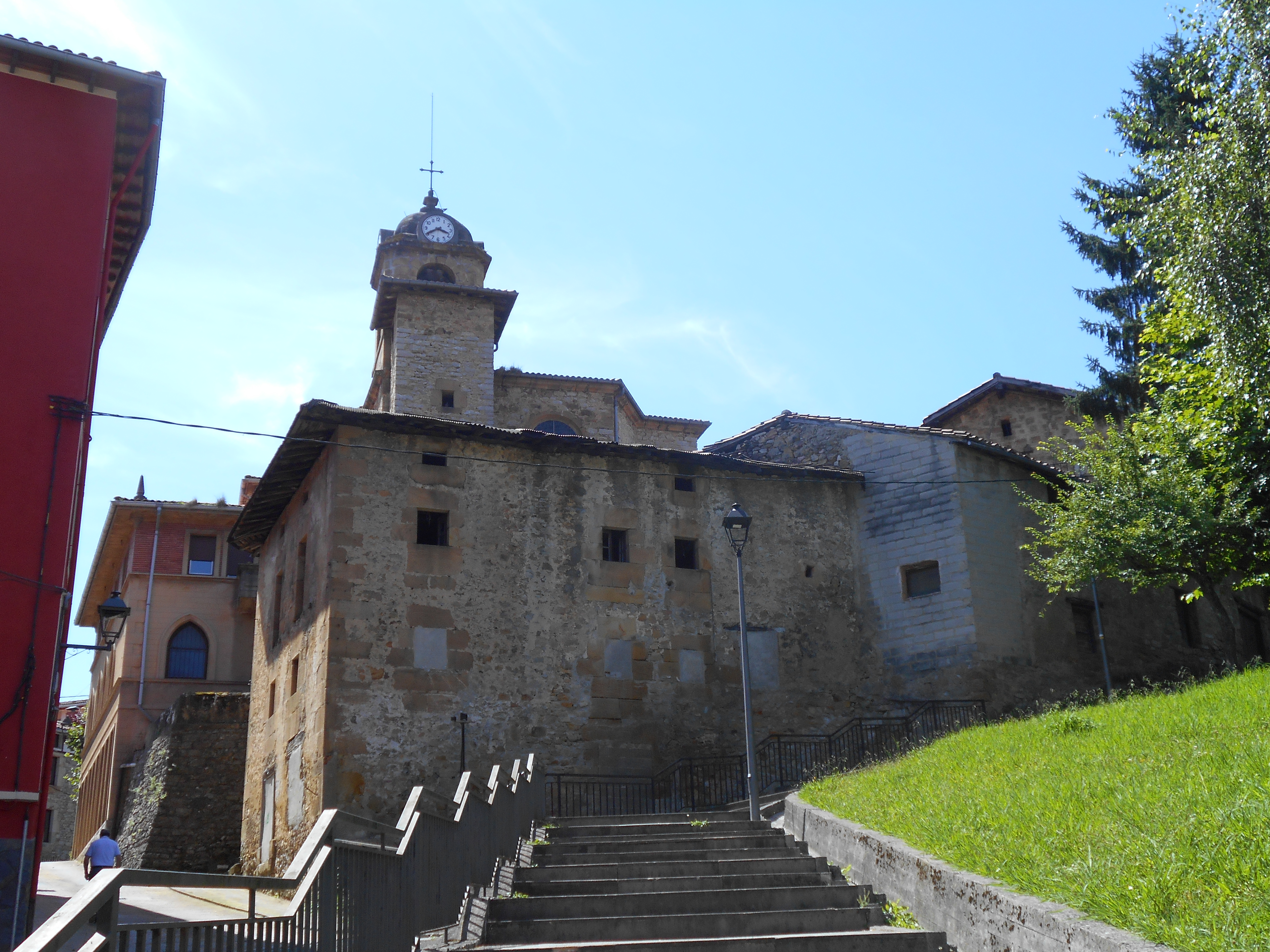
San Andrés church

Zaldibar can be translated from Basque as 'horse valley', from zaldi ('horse') and ibar ('valley'). The coat of arms of the town then includes a horse. Zaldívar is the name in Spanish. However, the town was named Zaldua (Basque) or Zaldúa (Spanish) until 1932. Zaldua is then translated from Basque to Spanish as "el soto", which might be referred to a sotobosque, Spanish word for understory. "Valley of the Soto" is then another possible origin of the current name.

Currently, Zaldua is considered an archaism and it is not used, being since 1980 Zaldibar the official name of the municipality.

== History ==
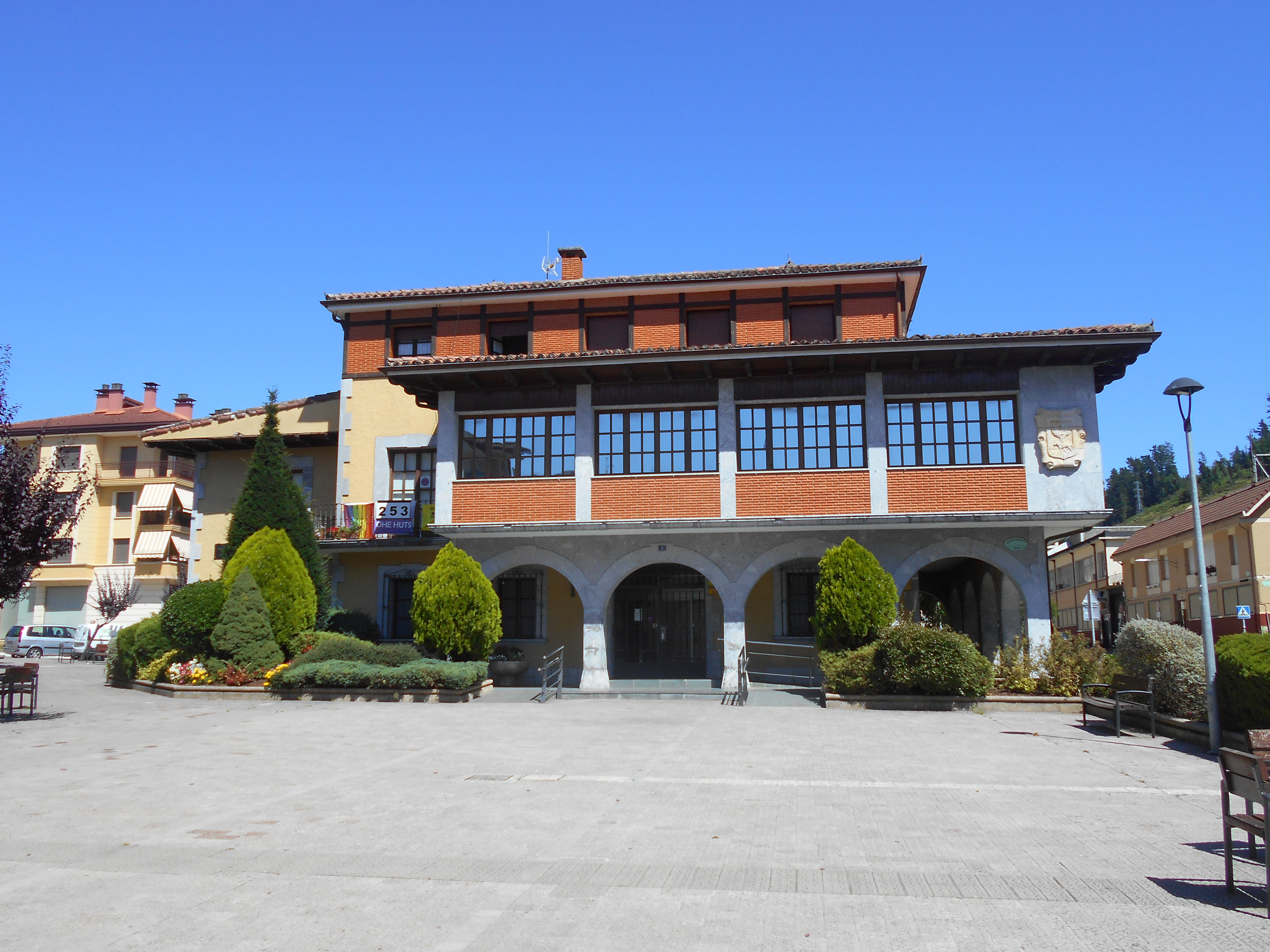
City hall

The elizate of Zaldua, today Zaldibar, was part of the ancient merindad of Durango and had voice and right to vote in the Juntas of Guerendiaga, where it occupied the seat number seven. As it is common with the elizates, the original date of founding is unknown. Tradition goes that the Navarre king Sancho II of Pamplona (935–994) lived ten years in one of the towers of Zaldibar as a prisoner.

The owners of the afore-mentioned tower controlled several territories of what today is Zaldibar. There are historical data that places the construction of the San Andrés church (the church of the town) in the 13th century. The church was reconstructed in 1778 from previous damage.

Zaldibar harbours an industrial dumping landfill managed by the private company VerterRecycling. In early February 2020, a landslide in the landfill blocked the main Bilbao–San Sebastián motorway, bringing about a major environmental disaster. Two operators remained missing under toxic mud for several weeks.

== Geography ==
The municipality of Zaldibar is located in the southeastern part of the comarca of Durangaldea and the province of Biscay. It borders at south with the municipality of Elorrio, at west with Berriz, at north with Mallabia and Ermua and at east with the province of Gipuzkoa.

=== Hydrography ===
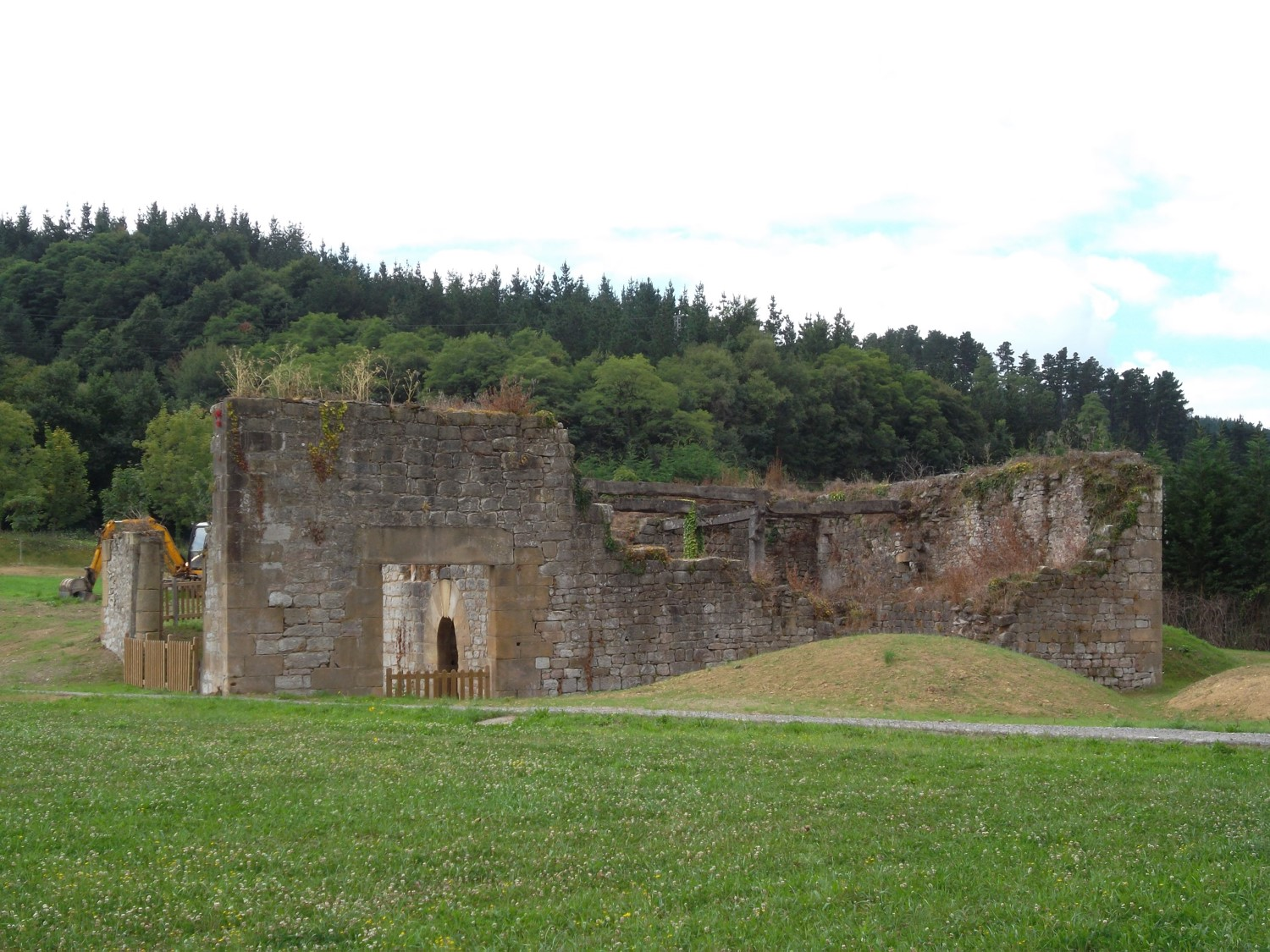
Ruins of the House-Tower

The main river of the town is the Zaldu or Zalduerreka, which joins the Ibaizabal river in Abadiño. The river is joined by several small streams as the Solozabal and Agirre-Sakona. The oriental part of the municipality is crossed by the Ego river, which joins the Deba river in Eibar.

== Transport ==
The main road communication of Zaldibar is the N-634 which crosses the town from east to west. The AP-8 highway also crosses the municipality but cannot be accessed from it; the nearest accesses are in Durango and Ermua. Both roads connect Zaldibar with the rest of Biscay (and its capital, Bilbao) and the province of Gipuzkoa (and its capital, San Sebastián).

Zaldibar has a station of the narrow-gauge regional railways, Euskotren Trena, which connects the town with other major municipalities and cities like Bilbao, Amorebieta-Etxano, Durango, Eibar, San Sebastián and Hendaye.
