= Orbea =

Spanish bicycle maker

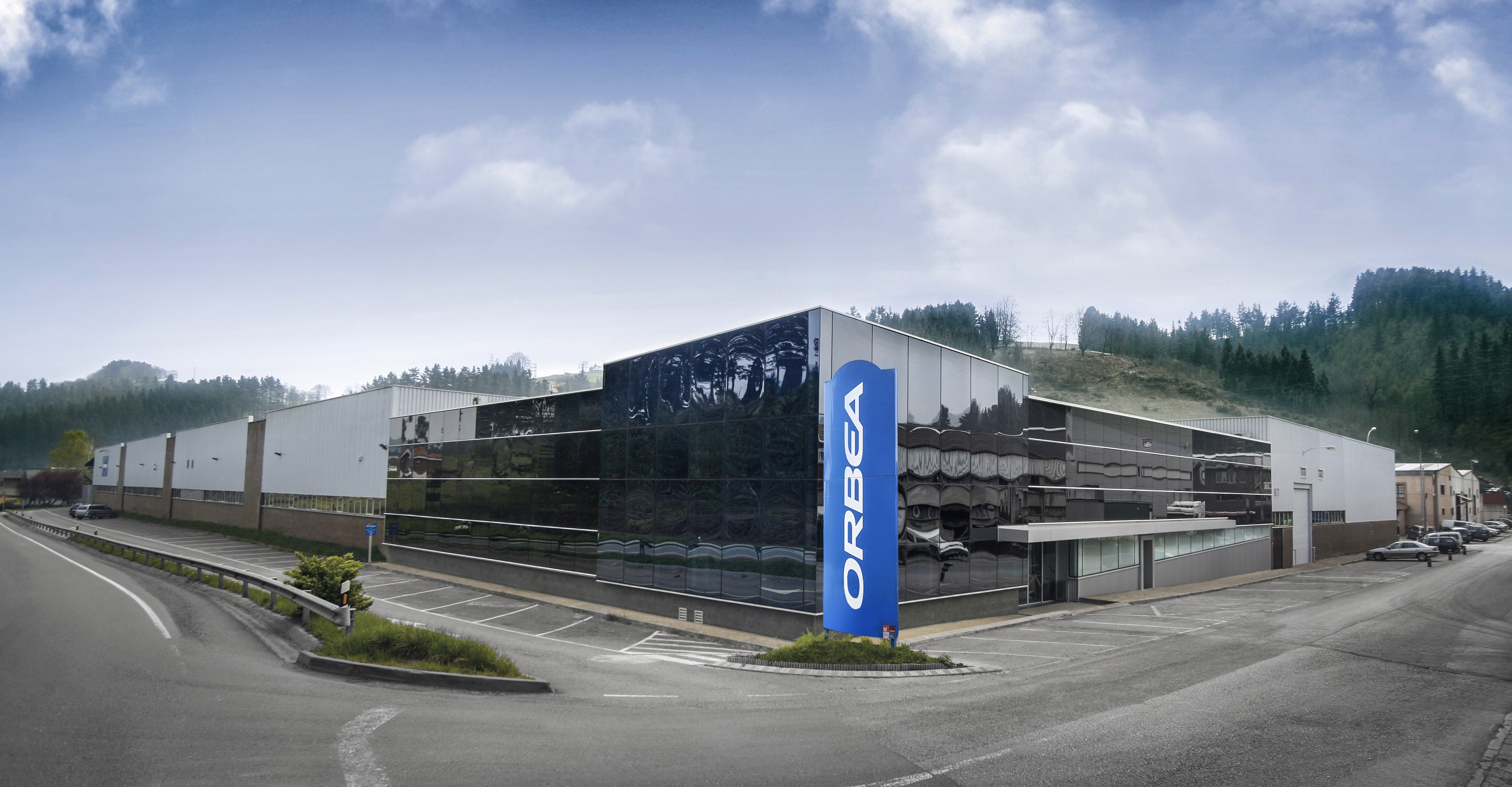
- Company type: Co-operative
- Industry: Bicycles
- Founded: 1840; 186 years ago
- Headquarters: Mallabia, Spain
- Area served: Worldwide
- Products: Bicycles and related components
- Website: orbea.com

Orbea is a bicycle manufacturer based in Mallabia, Spain. It is part of the Mondragón Cooperative Corporation and Spain's largest bicycle manufacturer. Orbea manufactures and assembles bikes at their own factories in Spain and Portugal.

== History ==
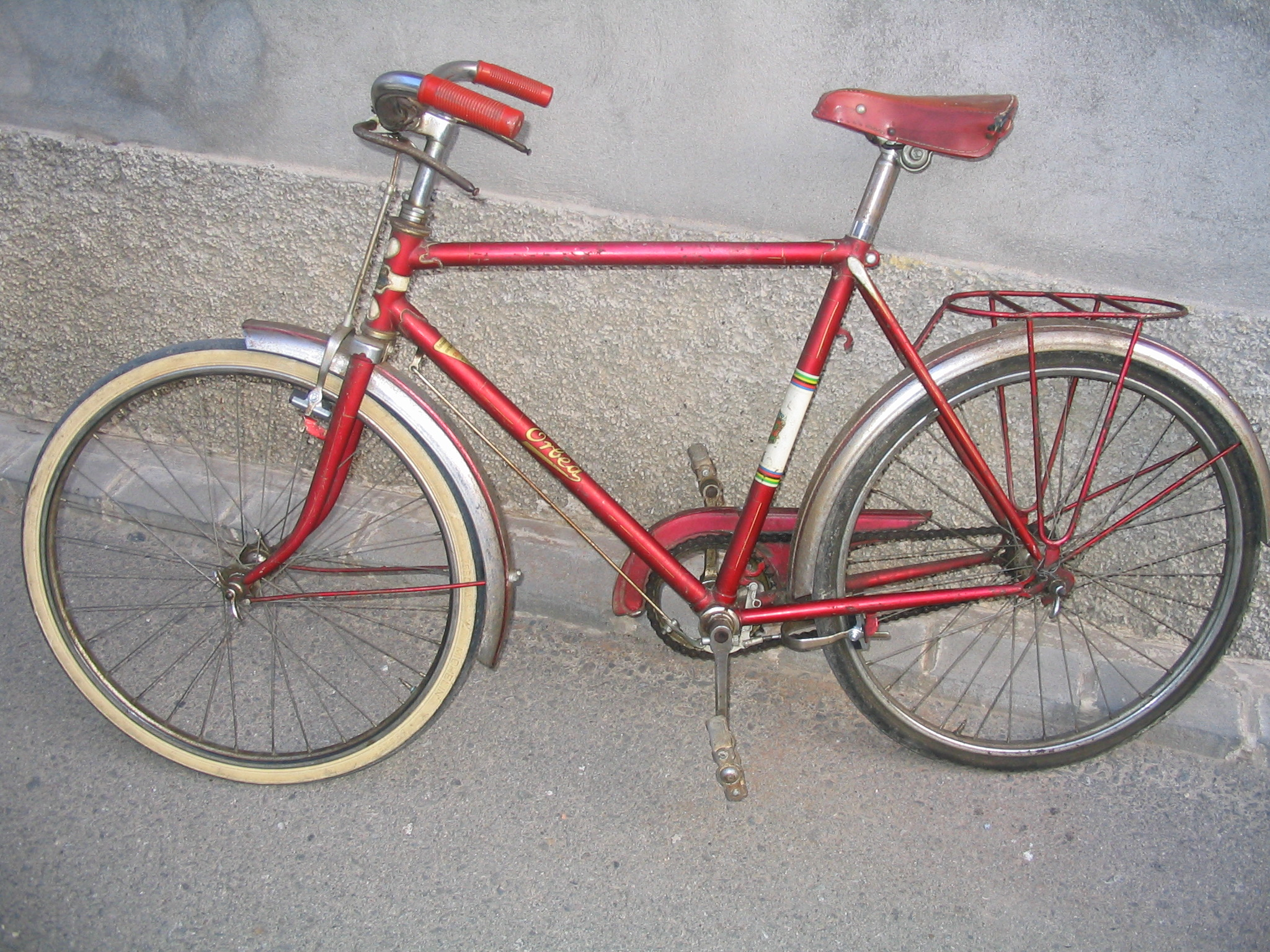
1970 Orbea city bike

Orbea was founded in 1840 by brothers Juan Manuel, Mateo, and Casimiro Orbea in Eibar, Basque Country, Spain. Originally a rifle and gun producer, Orbea exited the gun business and began designing and producing bicycles as Orbea Bicycles in 1930. Orbea began participating in the Tour de France as early as 1934, with famous Spaniard Mariano Cañardo as the face of the Orbea road cycling team.

In 1969, under dire financial circumstances, employees formed a co-operative and purchased Orbea from the Orbea family. The newly formed Orbea cooperative left Eibar the same year to nearby Mallabia, where their first dedicated bicycle factory was built. For the next several decades, the company would focus on producing leisure bikes for consumers in Spain and around Europe.

Orbea would return to competitive road cycling in the 1980s as Gin MG-Orbea and later SEAT-Orbea, led by Spaniard cyclists Pedro Delgado, Jokin Mújika, and Pello Ruiz Cabestany. Participating in both Tour de France and Vuelta a España.

Orbea began manufacturing mountain bikes in 1989.

== Products ==
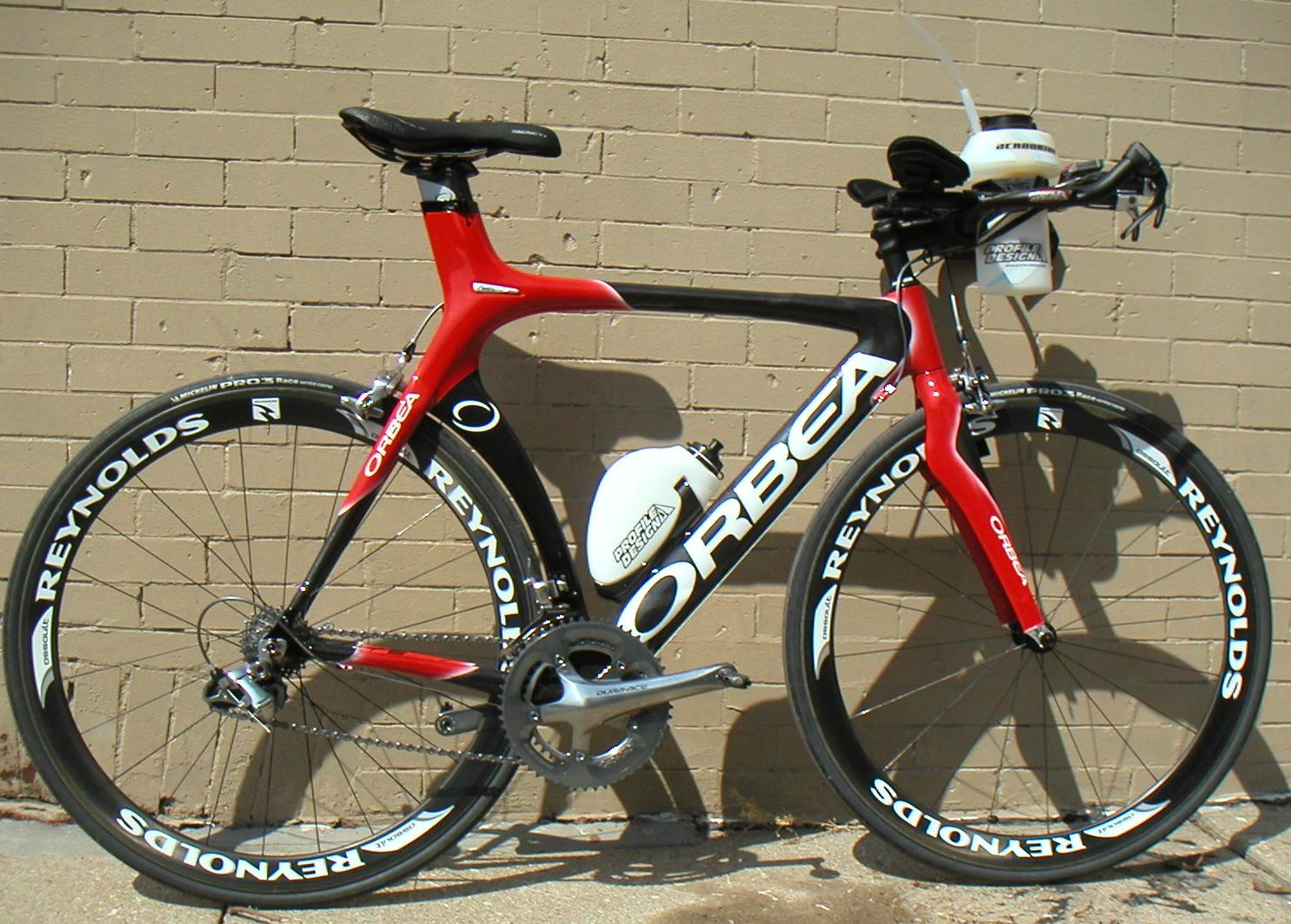
2007 Orbea Ordu carbon fiber time trial bicycle

Orbea designs and manufactures a variety of road, mountain, triathlon, and urban bikes. More famously seen in competitions: the Orca and Avant road bikes, Rallon and Occam Mountain Bikes, and Ordu time trial/triathlon models.

=== Competitive use ===
Orbea has sponsored and supplied bikes to teams, including the Euskaltel–Euskadi professional team in the Basque area of Spain and the Herring Gas team in the United States. Samuel Sánchez rode an Orbea Orca Carbon to win the road race at the Beijing Olympics and Julien Absalon won the mountain bike gold on an Orbea Alma. Craig Alexander, three time Ironman World Triathlon Champion (2008, 2009, 2011), rode an Orbea Ordu in his first 2 wins and although he had planned to spend the rest of his career racing on Orbea bicycles, having signed a lifetime contract with Orbea in 2010, he switched to another brand for the 2011 race.

The UCI Professional Continental team Cofidis Solutions Crédits raced Orbea bikes in the 2016 and 2017 seasons.

The UCI Domestic Elite Cycling Team, Rio Grande Elite Cycling Team, currently races on Orbea bikes.

=== E-bikes ===
Launching at the end of 2017, Orbea introduced the Gain e-bike model available in both road and hybrid model. Further to this they introduced the electric-assisted Orbea Wild mountain bike in 2019.
