= Mallabia =

Coordinates: 43°10′59″N 2°31′59″W

- Municipality
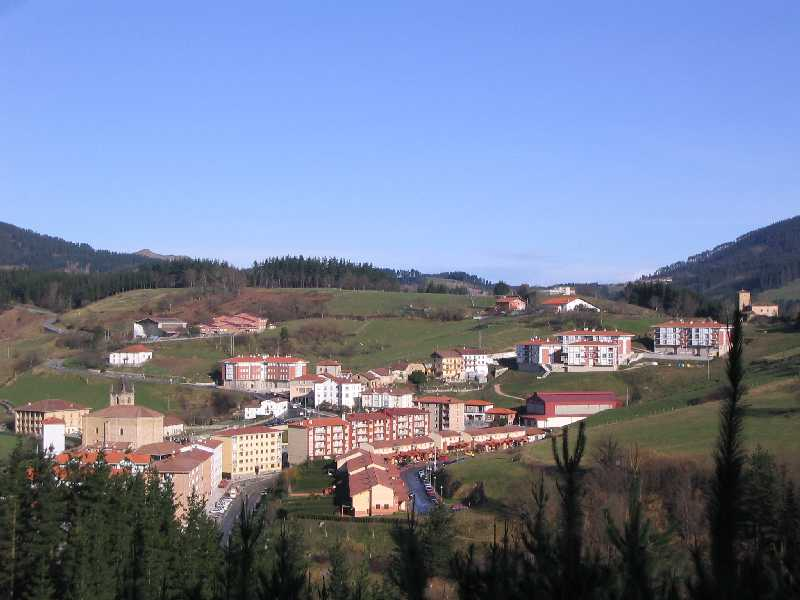
- Mallabia overview

- Flag Coat of arms

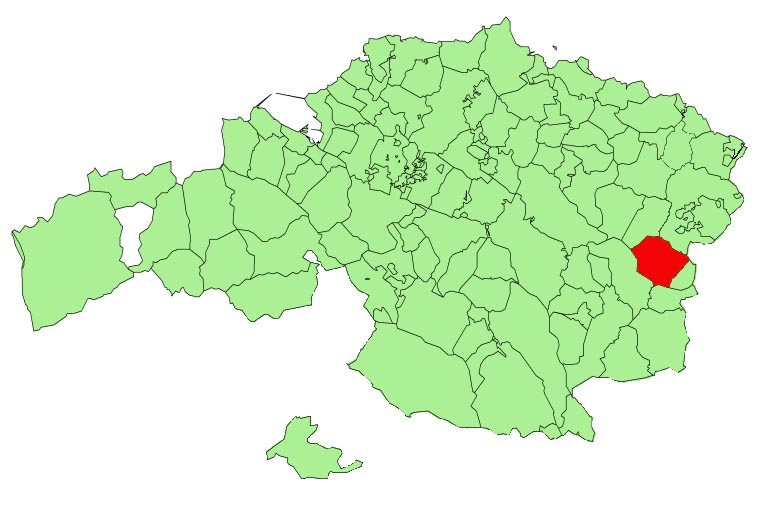
- Location of Mallabia in Biscay
- Country: Spain
- Autonomous community: País Vasco
- Province: Biscay
- Comarca: Durangaldea
- Established: Not known

Government
  - Mayor: Igor Agirre Barrientos (EAJ-PNV)

Area
  - Total: 23.79 km^{2} (9.19 sq mi)
- Elevation: 259 m (850 ft)

Population (2025-01-01)
  - Total: 1,106
  - Density: 46.49/km^{2} (120.4/sq mi)
- Demonym: Mallabitarra
- Time zone: UTC+1 (CET)
  - Summer (DST): UTC+2 (CEST)
- Postal code: 48260
- Website: Official website

Mallabia (in Basque and officially, in Spanish: Mallavia) is an elizate, town and municipality located in the province of Biscay, in the Basque Country, northern Spain. Mallabia is part of the comarca of Durangaldea and has a population of 1.135 inhabitants as of 2006 and according to the Spanish National Statistics Institute.

== Etymology ==
The etymology of the word Mallabia may come from the Basque word malla ('step', 'level' or 'height') and bi(a) ('two' or 'the one with two'), then refers to the place with "two levels" or "two heights".

== History ==
As it is common with the elizates, the date of foundation of Mallabia is unknown. Its origin is linked with the old Tierra Llana (Spanish for "flat lands") of the ancient merindad of Durango. At some point, it possibly split from the elizate of Zenarruza (in which lands the elizate of Ermua was founded). Since 1635, Mallabia had voice and right to vote in the Juntas of Guerediaga, where it occupied the seat number three. The local church was opened in the 11th century, it was reconstructed in the 16th century and finally finished in 1750.

== Geography ==
The municipality of Mallabia is located in the eastern part of Biscay. It limits at north with the municipalities of Markina-Xemein and Etxebarria, at south with Zaldibar at east with Eibar (province of Gipuzkoa) and Ermua and at west with Berriz.

== Transportation ==
The town is crossed by the roads BI-3301 (Ermua-Trabakua), BI-633 (Durango-Ondarroa) and the N-634, which connects the town with Bilbao, San Sebastián, Durango and Eibar, among others. The nearest highway is the AP-8, which cannot be accessed from the town; the closest access is located in Ermua.

The narrow-gauge regional railways Euskotren Trena does not have a station in the town, despite crossing near to it.

== Notable people ==
- Gorka Arrizabalaga, cyclist
- Francisco de Longa, lieutenant general who fought in the Peninsular War
- Andoni Monforte (born 1946), politician
- Mikel Pradera, cyclist
