= Mikel Pradera =

Spanish cyclist

Personal information
- Full name: Mikel Pradera Rodríguez
- Born: March 6, 1975 (age 51) Mallabia, Spain

Cycling career
- Sport: Cycling
- Current team: Benfica
- Discipline: Road
- Role: Rider

Professional teams
- 1999–2000: Euskaltel-Euskadi
- 2000–2003: O.N.C.E.-Eroski
- 2004–2006: Illes Balears-Caisse d'Epargne
- 2007–2008: Benfica

Mikel Pradera Rodríguez (born March 6, 1975, in Mallabia, Basque Country) is a Spanish professional road bicycle racer.

== Major results ==
1999
2nd Overall G.P. Portugal Telecom
2000
7th Overall Critérium du Dauphiné Libéré
10th Classique des Alpes
2001
10th GP Miguel Induráin
2004
10th Overall Vuelta a la Rioja
2008
8th Overall Clásica Internacional de Alcobendas
