= Andoni Monforte =

Spanish politician (born 1946)

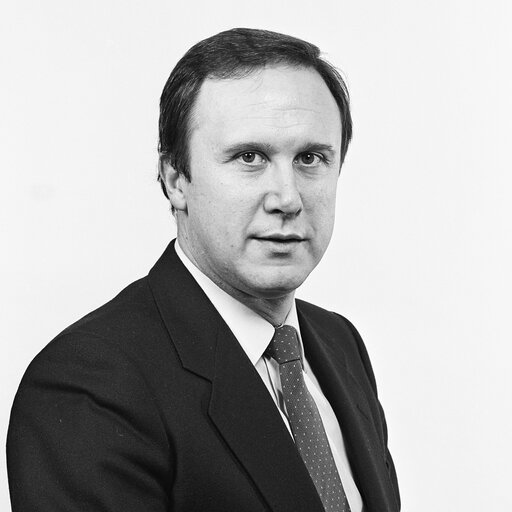
- Official portrait as MEP

Member of the European Parliament
- In office 1 January 1986 – 5 July 1987
- Constituency: Spain

Minister of Health of the Basque General Council
- In office 24 February 1978 – 9 April 1980
- President: Ramón Rubial (1978 – May 1979); Carlos Garaikoetxea (May 1979 – 1980)
- Succeeded by: Jesús Javier Aguirre

Member of the Congress of Deputies
- In office 15 June 1977 – 23 April 1986
- Constituency: Gipuzkoa

Personal details
- Born: Antonio Monforte Arregui; 12 June 1946 (age 79) Mallabia, Spain
- Party: EAJ/PNV

Andoni Monforte Arregui (born 12 June 1946) is a Spanish politician and lawyer from the Basque Country. He served in the Congress of Deputies and the European Parliament as a member of the Basque Nationalist Party.

== Biography ==
Monforte was born in Mallabia, in the province of Biscay. He studied law at the University of Valencia and from 1972 to 1977 worked as a lawyer for the Mondragon Corporation. A member of the Basque Nationalist Party, Monforte was elected to the Congress of Deputies in 1977, 1979 and 1982. In the run-up to the 1986 NATO membership referendum he stated that the origins of the organization were closely linked to democracy, and advocated for a common European defense policy.

He also served as Minister of Health of the Basque General Council (the predecessor of the current Basque Government) from 1978 to 1980. In December 1985 he was elected by the Cortes Generales as one of the sixty members of the European Parliament for Spain until an election could be held. He served from January 1986 to July 1987.
