= Durangaldea =

Coordinates: 43°09′34″N 2°37′16″W

- Eskualdea / Comarca
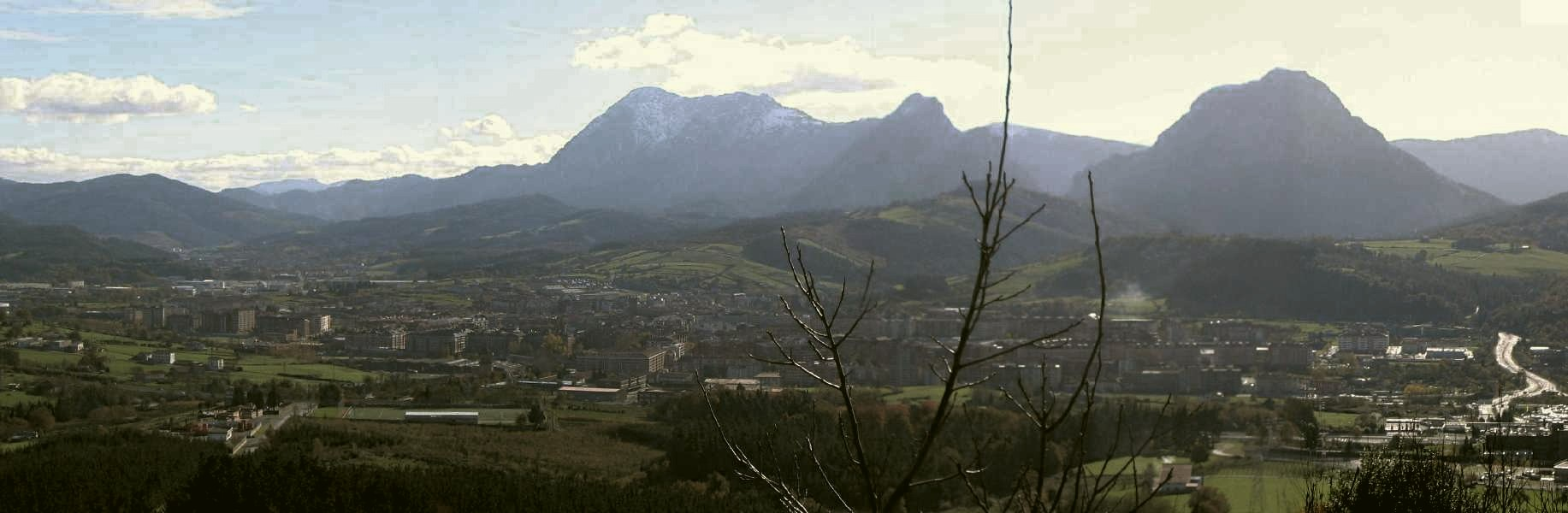
- Interactive map of Durangaldea
- Country: Spain
- Autonomous community: Basque Country
- Province: Biscay
- Capital: Durango

Durangaldea (Spanish: Duranguesado) is a comarca of Biscay located in the Basque Country, Spain. It is one of the seven eskualdeak/comarcas or regions that compose the province of Biscay. The capital city of Durangaldea is Durango.

== Geography ==
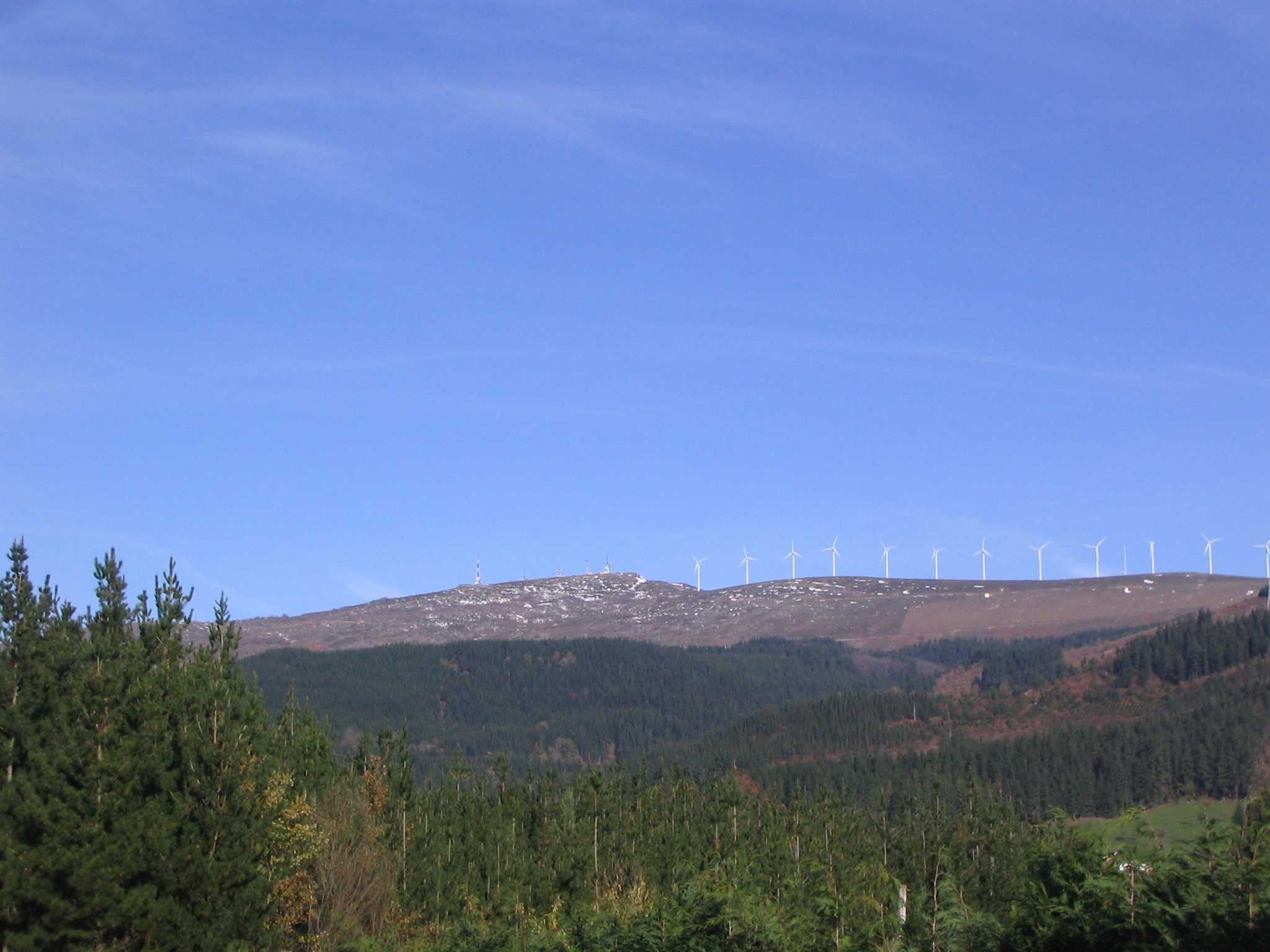
Oiz mountain.

Durangaldea is located at the southeast of the province of Biscay, limiting with the provinces of Gipuzkoa and Álava. It spans the territory between Oiz mountain and the border with the province of Álava in the south. Its total area is 240.13 square kilometres (92.71 sq mi).

Most of the towns that compose the comarca are located on a great valley formed by the Ibaizabal river, that crosses it from east to west. Otxandio is the only town that belongs to Durangaldea but is not part of the valley.

== History ==
Durangaldea (also known by its Spanish name, Duranguesado) was during the Middle Ages a district apart from Biscay (the Señorío) and a dependency of Navarre, but was conquered by Castile in 1200. It remained separate from Biscay until 1630, and it held its own compilation of laws, with its regional council joining in Gerediaga, Abadiño. Its lords founded four chartered towns, namely Ermua, Elorrio, Durango, and Otxandio.

== Municipalities ==
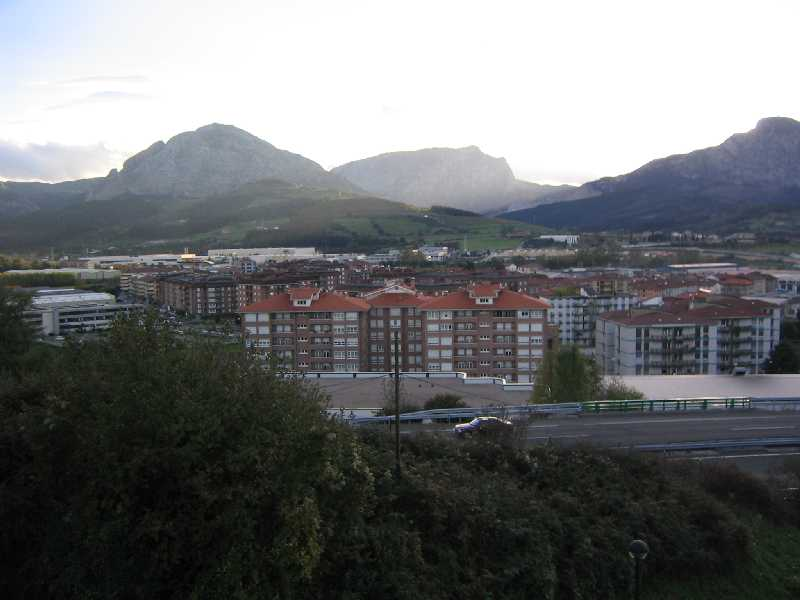
Matiena, part of Abadiño.

Durangaldea is divided into twelve municipalities, of which Durango is the capital city. The municipalities that compose the comarca are the same ones that made the merindad of Durango, the previous administrative division. Their areas and populations are set out below. Ermua and Mallabia belong to the province of Biscay, but administratively are not part of Durangaldea, being part of another comarca, Debabarrena, which is part of Gipuzkoa.

#	Municipality	Population	Land area in km^{2}
	Abadiño	7,599	36.06
	Amorebieta-Etxano	19,329	58.46
	Atxondo	1,366	23.21
	Berriz	4,623	30.07
	Durango	29,729	10.91
	Elorrio	7,372	37.32
	Garai	327	7.12
	Ermua	15,880	6.49
	Izurtza	255	4.28
	Iurreta	3,662	18.84
	Mallabia	1,158	23.79
	Mañaria	515	17.73
	Otxandio	1,314	12.43
	Zaldibar	3,043	11.84

== Economy ==
The economy of Durangaldea is mainly industrial, although the primary sector is also important.

=== Primary sector ===
It is the second most important sector of the economy in the region after the industry. The animal husbandry is specially important, as well as the wood production. The minery is also an important section of the economy, currently being produced limestone and marble. Mines of iron, lead and copper have also been exploited.

=== Secondary sector ===
The siderurgy has been one of the most developed type of industries in Durangaldea. Besides it, other industries like paper producers or tool producers also exist.

== Transportation ==
Durangaldea is connected to the three Basque provinces by roads, Álava in the south by the BI-623 and Bilbao and San Sebastián by the road N-634. The Cantabric Highway also crosses the comarca, and can be accessed from Durango and connects the city with Bilbao, San Sebastián] and the French border.

EuskoTren also operates in the region, offering commuter rail services. The train line connects with Bilbao and other comarcas of the province and also with Gipuzkoa. EuskoTren has train stations in Abadiño, Amorebieta-Etxano, Berriz, Durango and Zaldibar. The bus company BizkaiBus also operates in the region, connecting all the municipalities with others on different comarcas.

== See also ==
- Lord of Biscay
- Comarcas of Spain
