= Ermua =

- Municipality
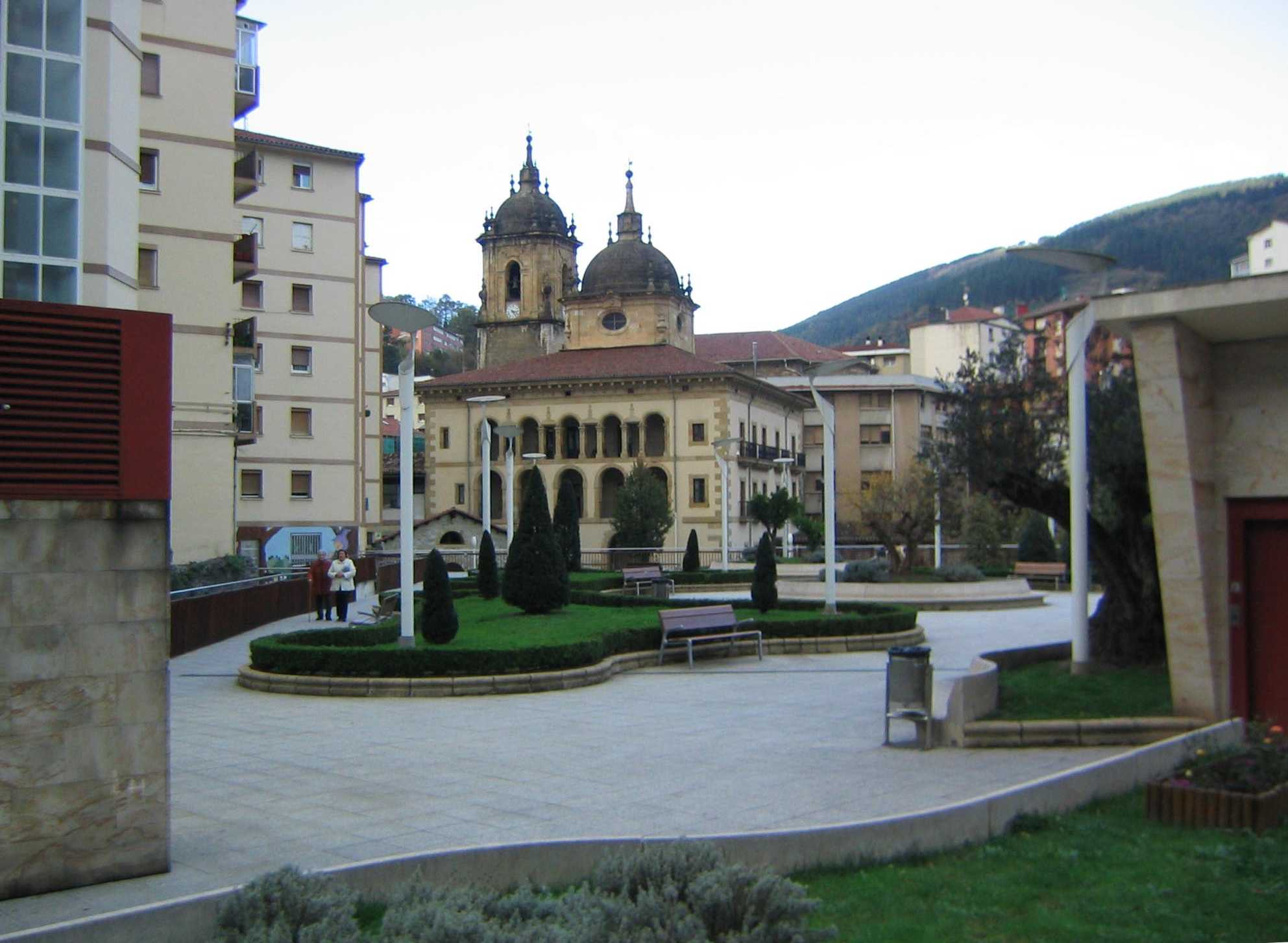
- The Valdespina Palace, now the Town Hall

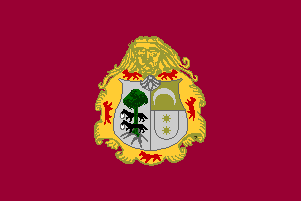
- Flag Coat of arms

- Location of Ermua within the Basque Country
- Coordinates: 43°11′15″N 2°30′3″W
- Country: Spain
- Autonomous community: Basque Country
- Province: Biscay
- Comarca: Durangaldea

Government
  - Mayor: Carlos Totorika Izagirre (PSE)

Area
  - Total: 6 km^{2} (2.3 sq mi)
- Elevation (AMSL): 165 m (541 ft)

Population (2025-01-01)
  - Total: 15,516
  - Density: 2,600/km^{2} (6,700/sq mi)
- Time zone: UTC+1 (CET)
  - Summer (DST): UTC+2 (CEST (GMT +2))
- Postal code: 48260
- Area code: +34 (Spain) + 943 (Gipuzkoa)
- Website: www.ermua.es

Ermua is a town and municipality located in the province of Biscay, in the autonomous community of Basque Country, northern Spain. In 2019, Ermua had 15,880 inhabitants.

Ermua is a town in the Durangaldea comarca of the province of Biscay in northern Spain. It is situated in a steep-sided valley beside the Río Ego, a tributary of the Deba River. Because of the steep, irregular terrain, building space is limited, and Ermua is one of the most densely populated towns in the Basque country. To the north of Ermua lies the municipality of Mallabia, to the east lies Eibar and to the south lies Zaldibar.

Eibar is a larger town which lies just across the provincial border, in the province of Gipuzkoa, the two towns forming a single urban area. Ermua has grown greatly in size during the 1960s and 1970s and acts as a dormitory town to Eibar, both of them being industrial towns. Ermua and Eibar are linked by the N-634 and share a common exit from the Autopista AP-8 (AP-8), the toll road that crosses the Basque Country, and connects Bilbao with the French border. Ermua and Eibar are also connected by the narrow gauge railway that runs from Bilbao to San Sebastián. Historic buildings in Ermua include the Church of Santiago Apóstol, an unusual Renaissance building with a fine bell tower, the Baroque Valdespina Palace, which is now the Town Hall, and the sixteenth century Lobiano Palace.

== Foro de Ermua ==
On 10 July 1997, Miguel Ángel Blanco, a town councillor in Ermua, was kidnapped by ETA, the Basque separatist organization. ETA demanded that the Spanish government transfer members of the organization imprisoned outside the Basque Country to prisons in the Basque Country, and when the Spanish government did not accede to their demands, their hostage was executed. His kidnapping and death had a great impact on both Spanish and Basque society and sparked the formation of an anti-terrorism organisation, a peace movement known as "Foro de Ermua". It aimed to promote political and civil liberties but was limited in popular appeal, being handicapped by being supported by the Basque elite and Spanish nationalists.
