= Elorrio =

- Municipality
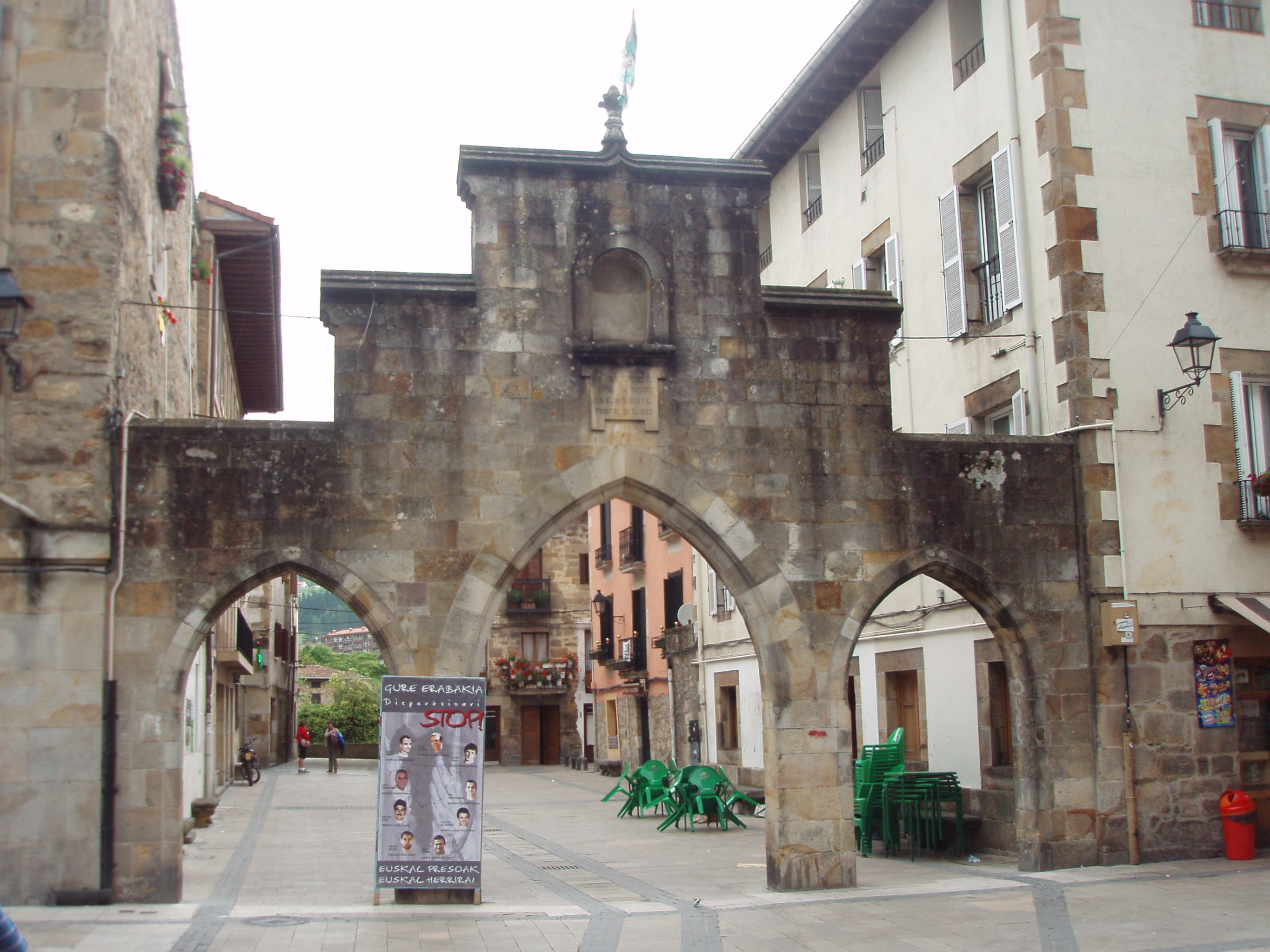
- An archway in Elorrio

- Coat of arms
- Nickname: Elorrixo
- Location of Elorrio within the Basque Country Location of Elorrio within Spain
- Coordinates: 43°7′50″N 2°32′34″W
- Country: Spain
- Autonomous community: Basque Country
- Province: Biscay
- Comarca: Durangaldea
- Founded: 1356

Government
  - Mayor: Ana Otadui (EAJ-PNV)

Area
  - Total: 37.32 km^{2} (14.41 sq mi)
- Elevation: 185 m (607 ft)

Population (2025-01-01)
  - Total: 7,277
  - Density: 195.0/km^{2} (505.0/sq mi)
- Demonym(s): Spanish: elorriano (ana); Basque: elorriotarra
- Time zone: UTC+1 (CET)
  - Summer (DST): UTC+2 (CEST)
- Postal code: 48230
- Website: Official website

Elorrio is a town and a municipality located in the eastern part of the province of Biscay, in the Basque Country, in northern Spain. As of 2017, it has a population of 7,307 inhabitants. It covers an area of 37.20 square kilometers and has a population density of 193.58 people per square kilometer. It holds the medieval title of Most Loyal and Noble Villa (Spanish: Muy Noble y Muy Leal Villa).

Elorrio was founded in 1356 by the Infante Tello Alfonso of Castile, who was the 20th Lord of Biscay, near the elizate of Saint Agustín of Etxebarria (Basque: San Agustin Etxebarria; Spanish: San Agustín de Echevarría). Historically, San Agustin Etxebarria was part of the medieval County of Durango, and Elorrio remains part of the comarca (local region) of Durangaldea. In 1630, Elorrio annexed Saint Agustín of Etxebarria, which today is a ward of Elorrio. Elorrio had municipal representation in the medieval Juntas Generales.

The town has been affected by its main economic activity: the industrial sector. It is also renowned for its rich architectural heritage, being listed as a Conjunto histórico by the Ministry of Culture.

== Toponymy ==
In the Basque language, elorrio is the word for the red fruit (haw) of the common hawthorn. The Basque word elorri means "hawthorn". The coat of arms of the town shows a hawthorn. Colloquially, the town was called Elorrixo in Basque.

== History ==
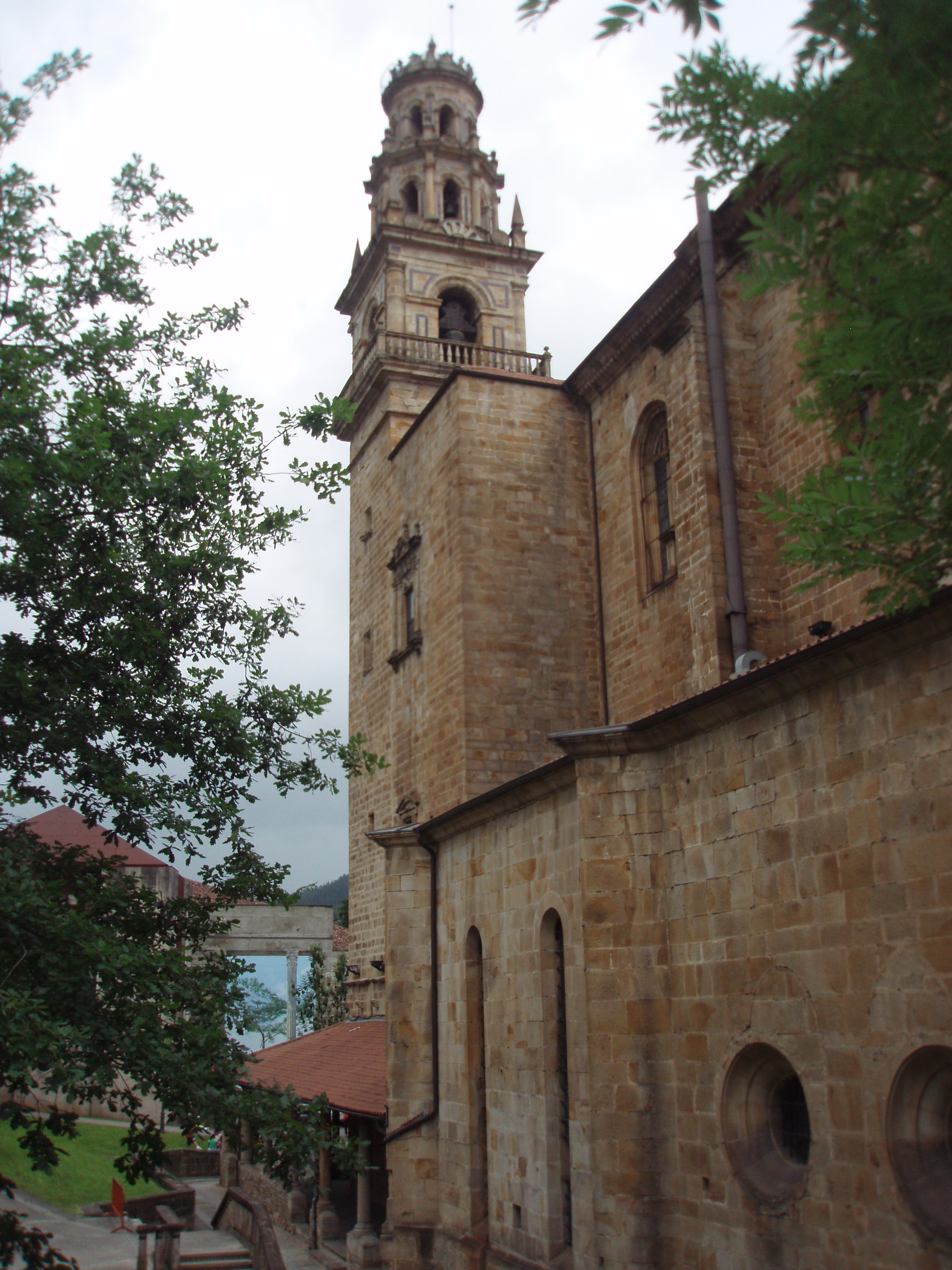
Elorrio's main church

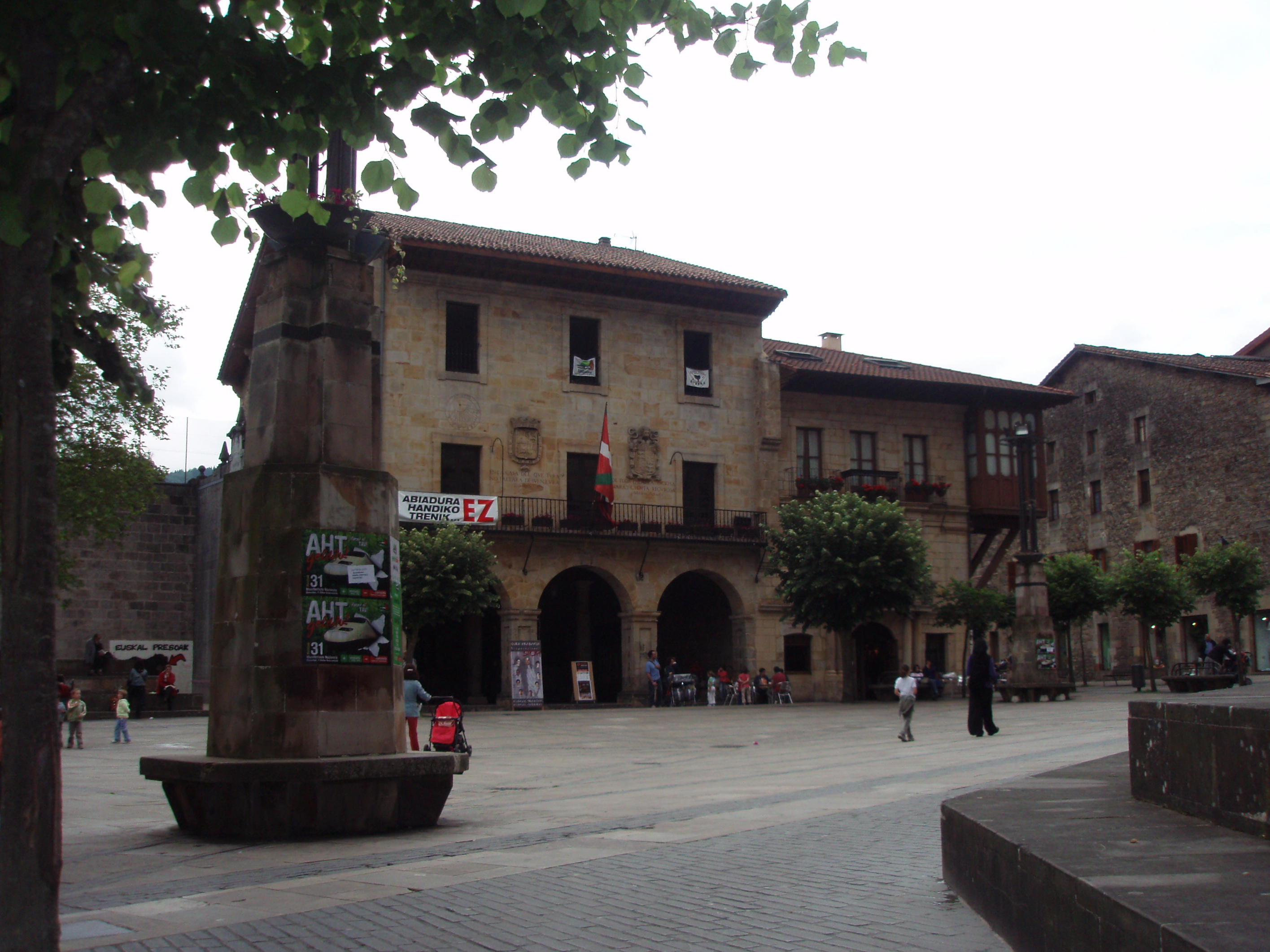
Elorrio's central plaza

The Argiñeta tombs that today lie just outside the town of Elorrio are both pre-Christian and Christian (the earliest date of the latter is recorded as 893). In 1053, the San Agustín de Etxebarria monastery was founded, which in time was renovated and eventually became present-day church (an example of Gothic architecture). In 1356, Don Tello, Lord of Biscay, officially created Elorrio (through a foundational charter) on the land where the monastery stood, as a means of creating a town to defend his borders against invasion from neighboring Gipuzkoa. In 1468 the town was the site of a major battle between warring clan factions in the Basque Country (the Oñacinos and the Gamboinos). However, incidents of this type decreased from the sixteenth to the eighteenth centuries, the town's fortunes grew, gaining renown for its iron-forges, and especially the production of lances.

As a result of this economic expansion, a number of important buildings were constructed (mostly during the sixteenth century) that are today considered monuments of significant historical and architectural importance. In the nineteenth and early twentieth centuries, Elorrio, although it remained a predominantly rural town, became a tourist destination, as people visited the locality to attend one of its two well-known spas. After the Spanish Civil War, Elorrio went through a period of industrialization, with a number of small, family firms and worker cooperative enterprises emerging. In 1964, the whole town was the first one in Biscay to be declared a Centre of Historical and Artistic Importance. Its population, which grew from 3,500 in 1950 to 8,000 in 1981, currently (2004 records) numbers just over 7,000 people.

== Geography ==
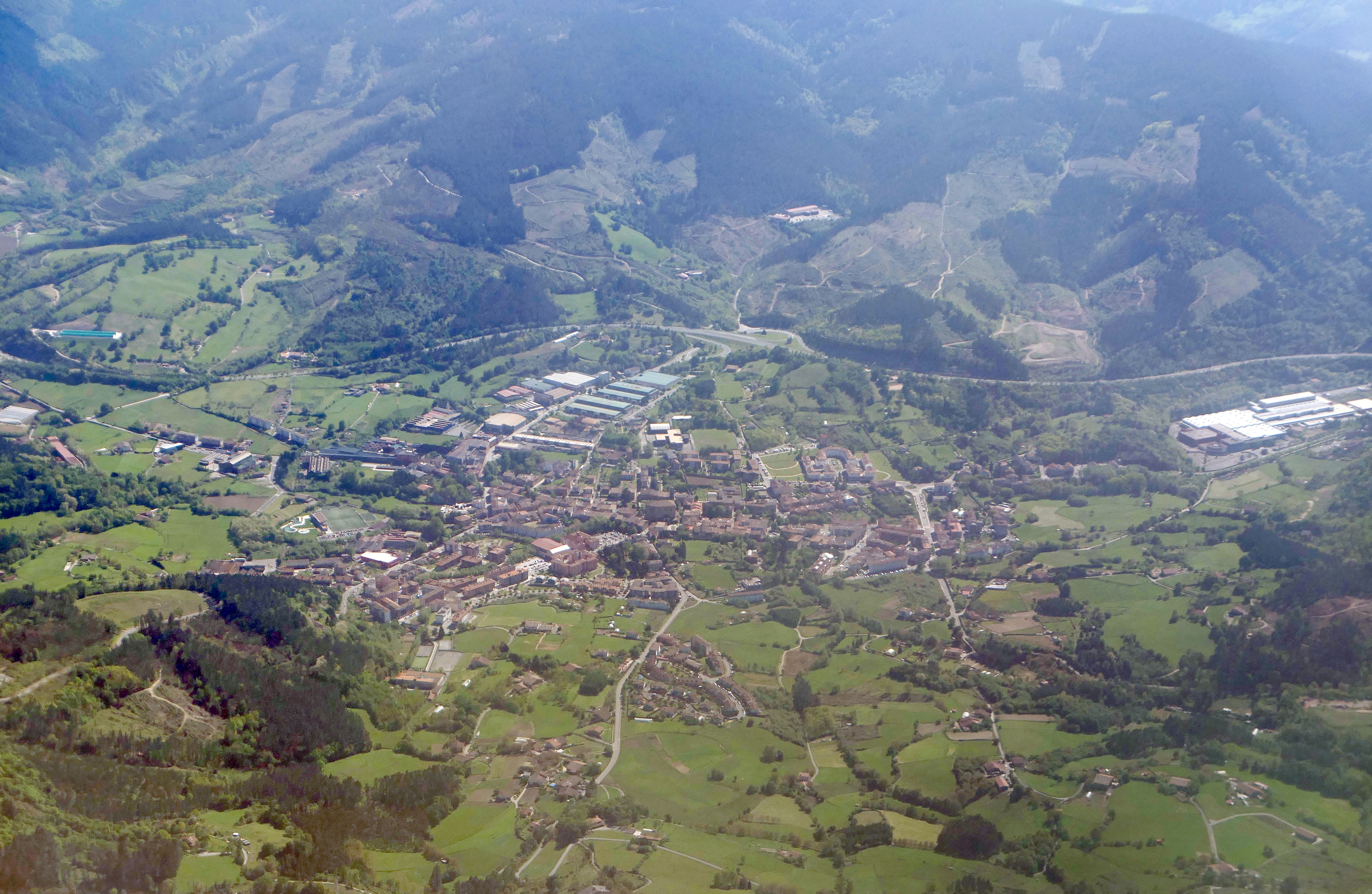
An aerial view.

Elorrio is located at the easternmost point of Biscay, in the comarca of Durangaldea, northern Spain. It limits at north with Berriz and Zaldibar at northwest with Abadiño, at west with Atxondo, at east with the province of Gipuzkoa and at south with the province of Álava.

The town is surrounded by various mountains, such as Intxorta (797m) and Udalatx (1092m), and is traversed by the Zumelegi river that, after joining the River Arrazola in Atxondo, goes on to form the Ibaizabal river.

The town is situated 39 km from the provincial capital of Bilbao.

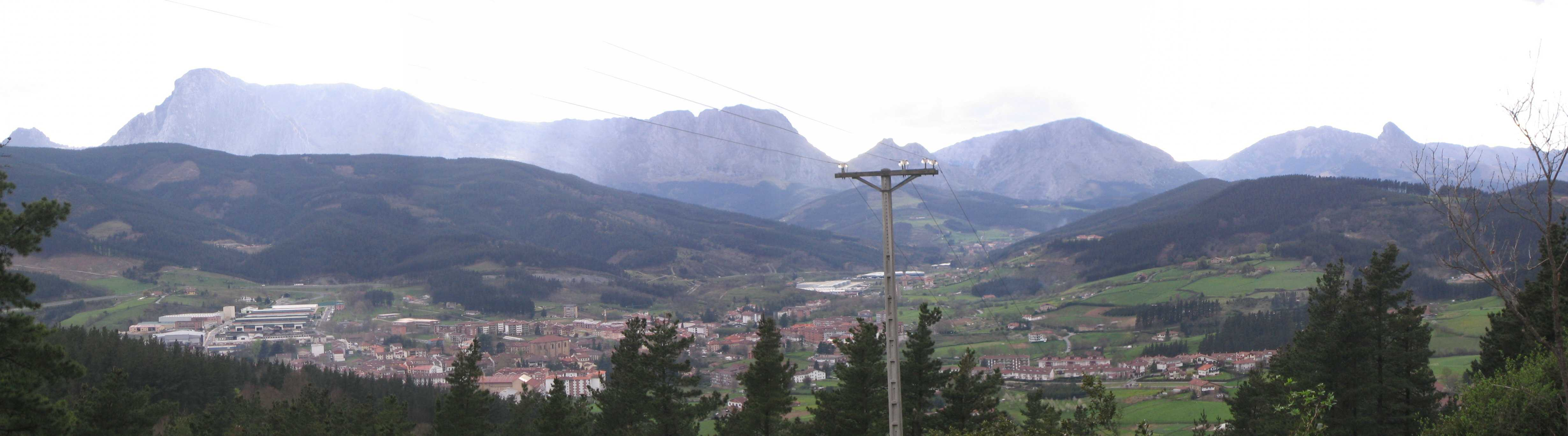
General overview of Elorrio

== Demographics ==
Historical population
Year	Pop.	±%
1900	2,776	—
1910	2,854	+2.8%
1920	3,014	+5.6%
1930	3,004	−0.3%
1940	3,077	+2.4%
1950	3,567	+15.9%
1960	4,830	+35.4%
1970	7,334	+51.8%
1981	7,857	+7.1%
1990	7,526	−4.2%
2000	7,166	−4.8%
2010	7,252	+1.2%
2013	7,294	+0.6%

The National Institute of Statistics estimates that the population of Elorrio was 7,372 in 2019.

== Economy ==
The economy of the municipality is based on the industrial activity. Nonetheless, the farming activities still have relevance in the area. Most of the rural exploitations are based on beef and milk production and, in less numbers, the exploitation of pines.

The most important economical activity in the area is the industry; Elorrio is home for several industries of metal processing.

== Transport ==
The only mean of transport is by road; the BI-634 road crosses the town and connects it with Durango, capital city of the comarca, and Arrasate-Mondragón in the province of Gipuzkoa. In Durango the road connects with the AP-8 highway to Bilbao and Donostia-San Sebastián while in Arrasate-Mondragón it connects to the AP-1 highway to Eibar and Vitoria-Gasteiz. From Elorrio starts the BI-2632 road to Bergara and Elgeta (both in Gipuzkoa) and the BI-3321 road to Berriz.

Two lines of the Bizkaibus network have stations in Elorrio; the lines A3923 and A3914. Elorrio then has buses to Bilbao every hour and to Durango and other lesser municipalities every 30 minutes.

== Notable people ==
- Saint Balendin Berrio-Otxoa (Valentín de Berrio-Ochoa in Spanish), one of the Vietnamese Martyrs, was born in Elorrio in 1827. Ordained in 1851, he became a Dominican and was later sent to Manila and Tonkin as a missionary. At the age of thirty-one, he was named a bishop, but was later killed in Tonkin in 1861. He was canonized by Pope John Paul II in 1988.
- José Antonio Ardanza, born in 1941, was lehendakari or president of the Basque Autonomous Community, 1985-1999. He was the CEO of Euskaltel, a Basque telecommunications company, until his retirement in 2011.
- Alejandro Goicoechea, born in 1895, was the engineer who developed with José Luis Oriol the Talgo railway vehicle. He died in 1984.
- Anne Igartiburu, born in 1969, is a Spanish TV presenter and actress.
- Victor Maria Bereicua, born in 1954, is a professional Jai-Alai player, who used the name 'Elorrio,' in honor of his hometown. Elorrio is famous for being the Jai-Alai player shown in the opening credits of the television series Miami Vice.
