= Berriz =

- Municipality
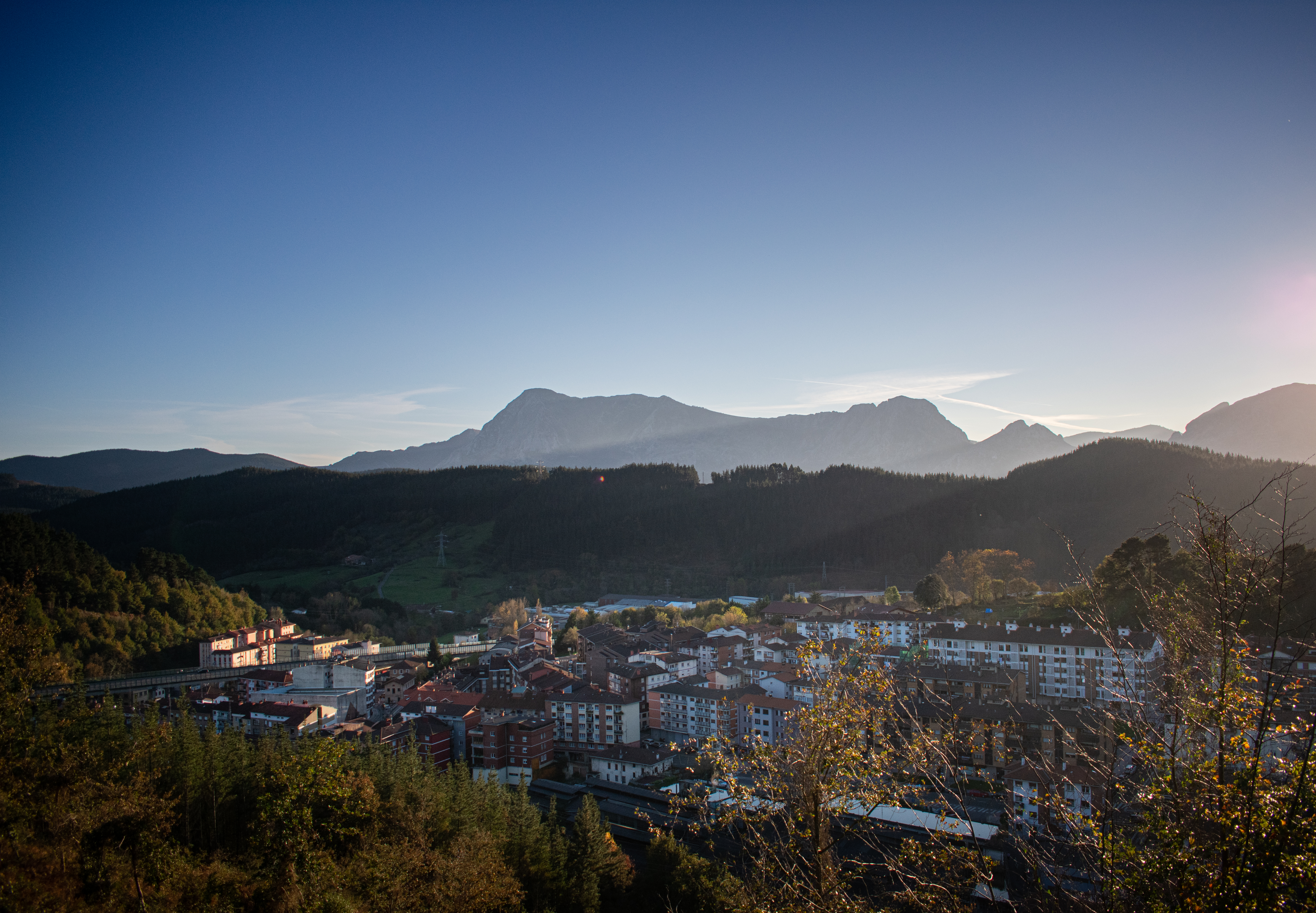

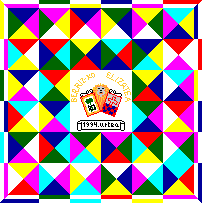
- Flag Coat of arms

- Location of Berriz within the Basque Country Location of Berriz within Spain
- Coordinates: 43°10′33″N 2°34′32″W
- Country: Spain
- Autonomous community: Basque Country
- Province: Biscay
- Comarca: Durangaldea

Government
  - Mayor: Jose Jabier Azpitarte Ariño

Area
  - Total: 30.07 km^{2} (11.61 sq mi)
- Elevation: 192 m (630 ft)

Population (2025-01-01)
  - Total: 4,533
  - Density: 150.7/km^{2} (390.4/sq mi)
- Demonym: Berritzarra
- Time zone: UTC+1 (CET)
  - Summer (DST): UTC+2 (CEST)
- Postal code: 48240
- Website: Official website

Berriz (in Basque and officially, in Spanish: Bérriz) is an elizate, town and municipality located in the province of Biscay, in the Basque Country, northern Spain. Berriz is part of the comarca of Durangaldea and has a population of 4.623 inhabitants as of 2019 and according to the Spanish National Statistics Institute.

== Toponymy ==
Berriz belongs to a series of Basque toponyms with an -iz ending. Julio Caro Baroja defended that most of these toponyms came from an original Basque toponym plus the Latin suffix -icus. Caro Baroja considered that on toponymy, the suffixes -oz, -ez and -iz used to be combined with the name of the owner of the lands, with its origin being in some place between the Middle Ages and the Roman Empire.

In the case of Berriz, Caro Baroja suggested that the name might come from Verrius, the documented Latin name. Then, to the name Verrius it was added the suffix -icus (indicating that the lands were owned by Verrius) and became Verricus. From then, the name evolved to Verrici and from there to Verriz. The name of the town in Spanish used to be Vérriz.

Another theory about is origin negates the Latin origin and proposes a Basque origin. Berriz might come from Be(h)e ("under") and Oiz in reference to the Oiz mountain, and then "under Oiz" as of "in the or at the bottom of Oiz".

== Notable people ==
- Miren Amuriza (born 1990), bertsolari and Biscayan writer
- Marino Lejarreta (born 1957), retired Spanish professional road racing cyclist
