= Bilbao metropolitan area =

Bilbao Metropolitan Area Bilbo Handia or Área metropolitana de Bilbao
- Urban area
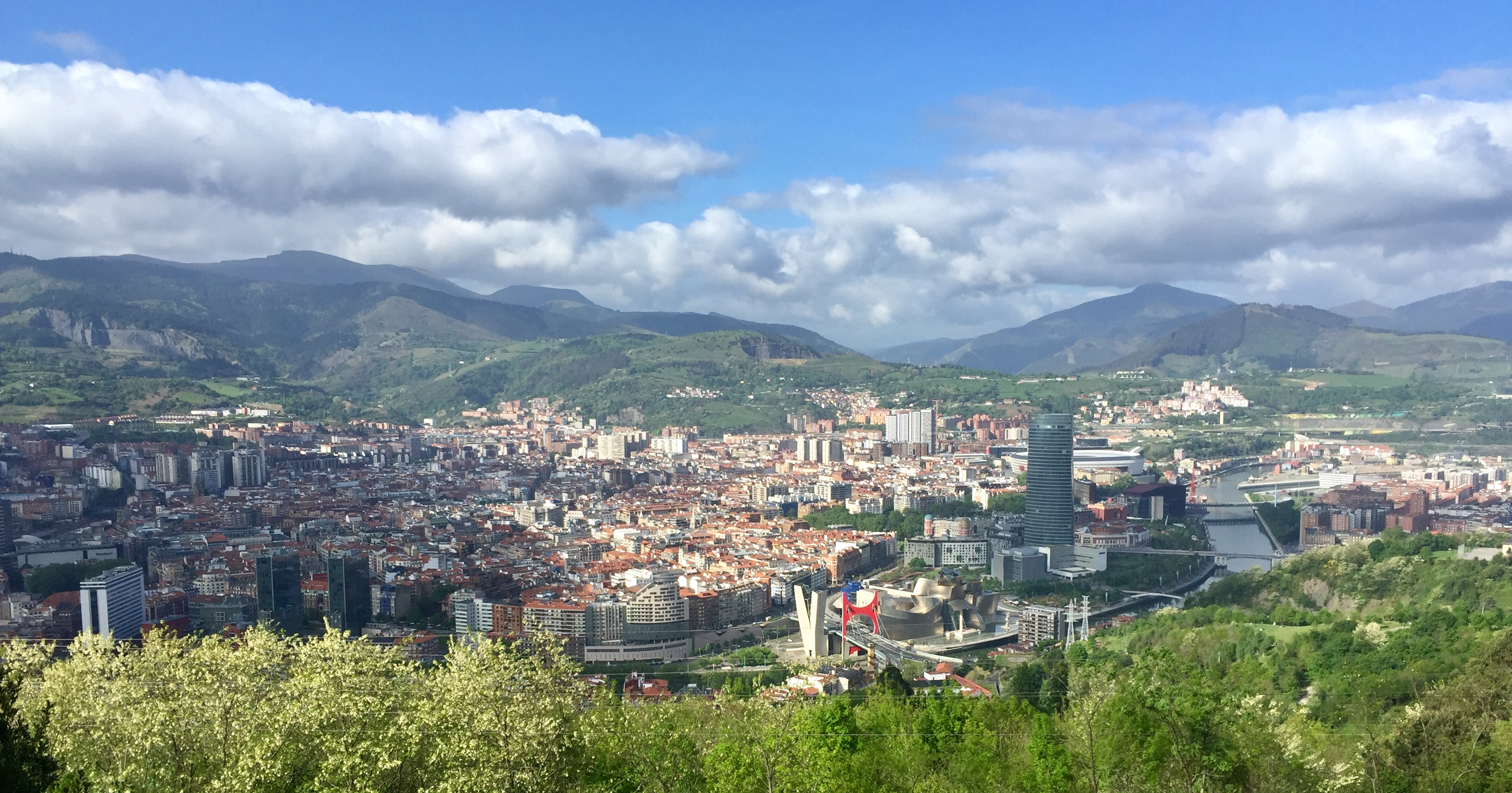
- Bilbao, the largest city in the metropolitan area

- Bilbao metropolitan area in Biscay
- Country: Spain
- Region: Biscay
- Largest city: Bilbao (345,821)

Area
  - Metro: 500 km^{2} (190 sq mi)

Population
  - Metro: 950,155
  - Metro density: 1,900/km^{2} (4,900/sq mi)

GDP
  - Metro: €32.891 billion

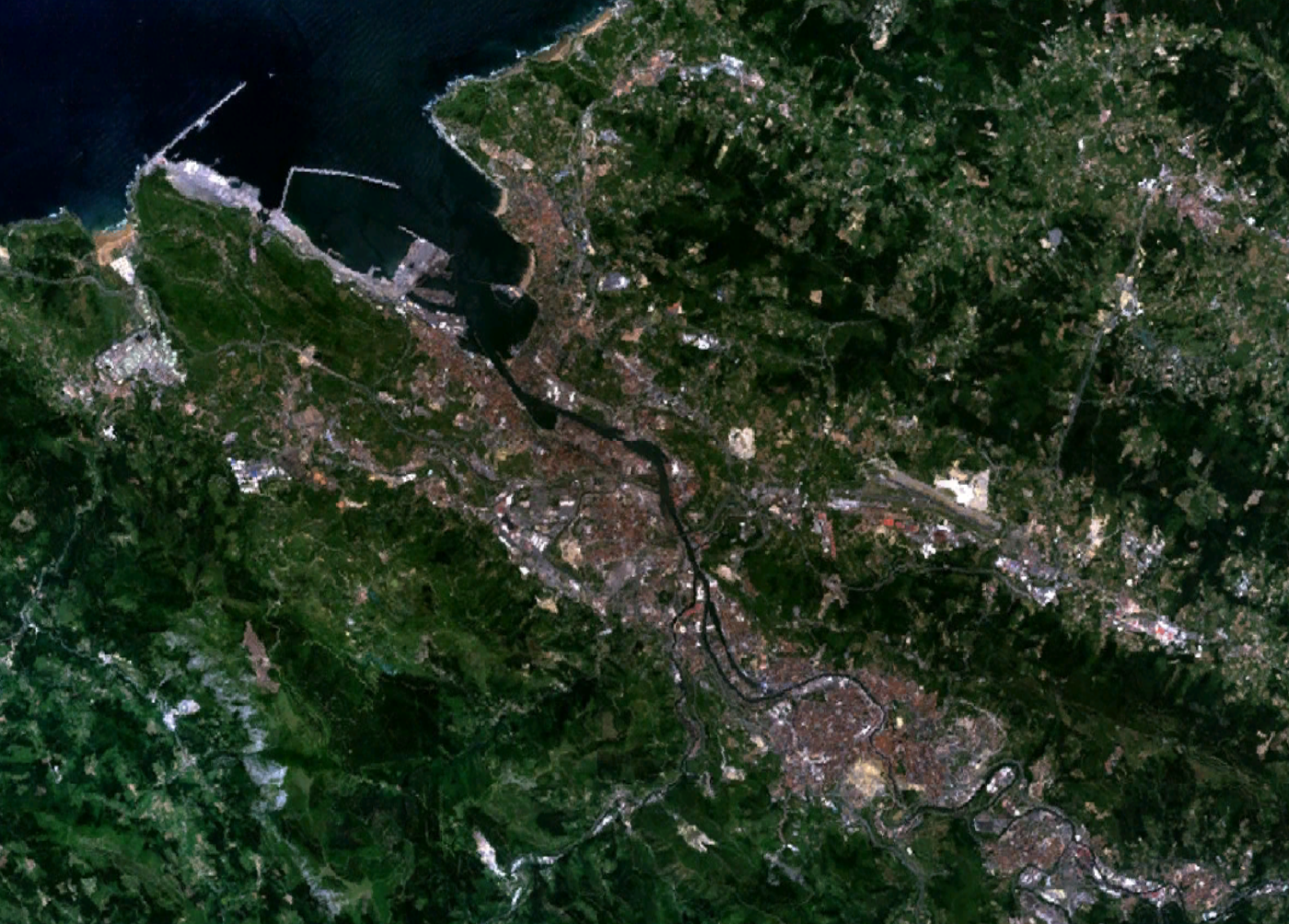
Gran Bilbao real color image taken by NASA's Landsat satellite.

The Bilbao Metropolitan Area (in Basque: Bilbo Handia, in Spanish: Área metropolitana de Bilbao) is the metropolitan area or continuous urban area based around the city of Bilbao, in the Basque Country, Spain. It comprises the city of Bilbao, the 25 municipalities that make the comarca of Greater Bilbao plus ten other surrounding municipalities, all of them in the province of Biscay.

It is the fifth most populated metropolitan area in Spain Almost 80% of the population of Biscay and 43% of the population of the Basque Country is concentrated in the Greater Bilbao area or the wider metropolitan area. The metropolitan area's municipalities, are defined by the Basque Country's Territorial Directives Other six satellite cities exist within the province of Biscay and the community of Cantabria, where commute between the cities and the metropolitan area in common.

== Constituent parts ==
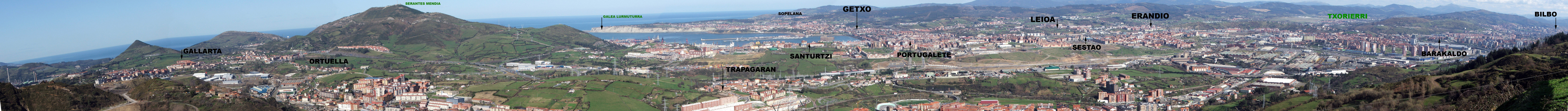
A panoramic view of Greater Bilbao, as seen from the funicular of La Reineta

The metropolitan area of Bilbao can be divided into the municipalities inside Greater Bilbao and the ones located outside. Greater Bilbao is a comarca, an administrative division of the province of Biscay and smaller than the wider metropolitan area. Plus, six municipalities outside the actual metropolitan area are considered satellite cities.

=== Greater Bilbao ===
Within the comarca of Greater Bilbao there are 25 municipalities corresponding to the city of Bilbao and the conurbation next to it, conformed by municipalities located along the Nervión River.

- Abanto Zierbena
- Alonsotegi
- Arrigorriaga
- Barakaldo
- Basauri
- Bilbao
- Derio
- Zierbena
- Etxebarri
- Erandio
- Galdakao
- Getxo
- Larrabetzu
- Leioa
- Lezama
- Loiu
- Muskiz
- Ortuella
- Portugalete
- Santurtzi
- Sestao
- Sondika
- Trapagaran
- Zamudio
- Zaratamo

=== Wider Metropolitan Area of Bilbao ===
These 10 municipalities are located outside the comarca of Greater Bilbao but inside the wider metropolitan area.

Municipality	Population 2018
Arrankudiaga	970
Barrika	1,541
Berango	7,130
Gorliz	5,683
Lemoiz	1,241
Plentzia	4,363
Sopelana (Sopela)	7,130
Ugao-Miraballes	4,124
Urduliz	4,319
Zeberio	1,059
Total	37,560

=== Satellite towns ===
These municipalities are located both outside Greater Bilbao and outside the metropolitan area itself, but they are considered "satellite towns". All of them, with the exception of Castro Urdiales which is located in the community of Cantabria (outside the community of the Basque Country) and Laudio which is located in Álava, are located in the province of Biscay, on different comarcas.

- Amorebieta-Etxano
- Castro Urdiales
- Durango
- Laudio
- Lemoa
- Mungia

== Structure ==
The area is usually structured into different zones:

- The city of Bilbao: The main business and services hub of the metropolitan area, with roughly 40% of its population.
- The left bank: Traditionally an industrial, port, and manufacturing zone. It includes Barakaldo, Sestao, Portugalete and Santurtzi. The main and biggest city is Barakaldo.
- The right bank: A residential area, including Erandio, Leioa, and the more affluent Getxo,.
- The mining zone, where the main iron ore resources were located: Muskiz, Gallarta, Ortuella
- Txoriherri, wide expansion zone where the international airport and the University of the Basque Country are located.
- Hego Uribe, including Basauri, Galdakao and Arrigorriaga.
- Uribe-Kosta: the coastal area north of Getxo is being integrated into the metropolitan area in the recent years, with the development of low density residential areas connected by the metro.

== Urban regeneration ==
The Bilbao Ria 2000 corporation was founded in 1992 by the Bilbao and Barakaldo municipalities, the Greater Bilbao metropolitan area, and the Basque and Spanish Governments. The corporation's aim was to regenerate the city-planning of Bilbao and its surroundings, which were heavily punished by intense industrial contamination and decay. Among the projects this institution implemented was the recovery of Abandoibarra, once an industrial ground and now the site of the Guggenheim Museum Bilbao and the Euskalduna Palace.

In parallel to Bilbao Ria 2000 , the Bilbao Metropoli-30 association was constituted in 1991 by the City council of Bilbao, the Biscay and Basque Governments and diverse public and private organizations for the regeneration of Metropolitan Bilbao.

The area is since 1995 fully interconnected by the Bilbao Metro.

== Population of the Metropolitan Area ==
- Metropolitan area (35 municipalities)

Area	Population
Left bank and Mining zone (Barakaldo - Santurtzi)	263,293
Hego Uribe (Basauri - Galdakao)	130,427
Bilbao (Bilbao - Txorierri)	379,116
Right Bank and Uribe Kosta (Getxo - Erandio)	177,319
Total	950,155

- Satellite towns (6 municipalities)

Municipality	Population 2018
Amorebieta-Etxano	19,140
Castro Urdiales	31,977
Durango	29,636
Laudio	18,205
Lemoa	3,521
Mungia	17,554
Total	120,033
