= Sopela =

- Municipality
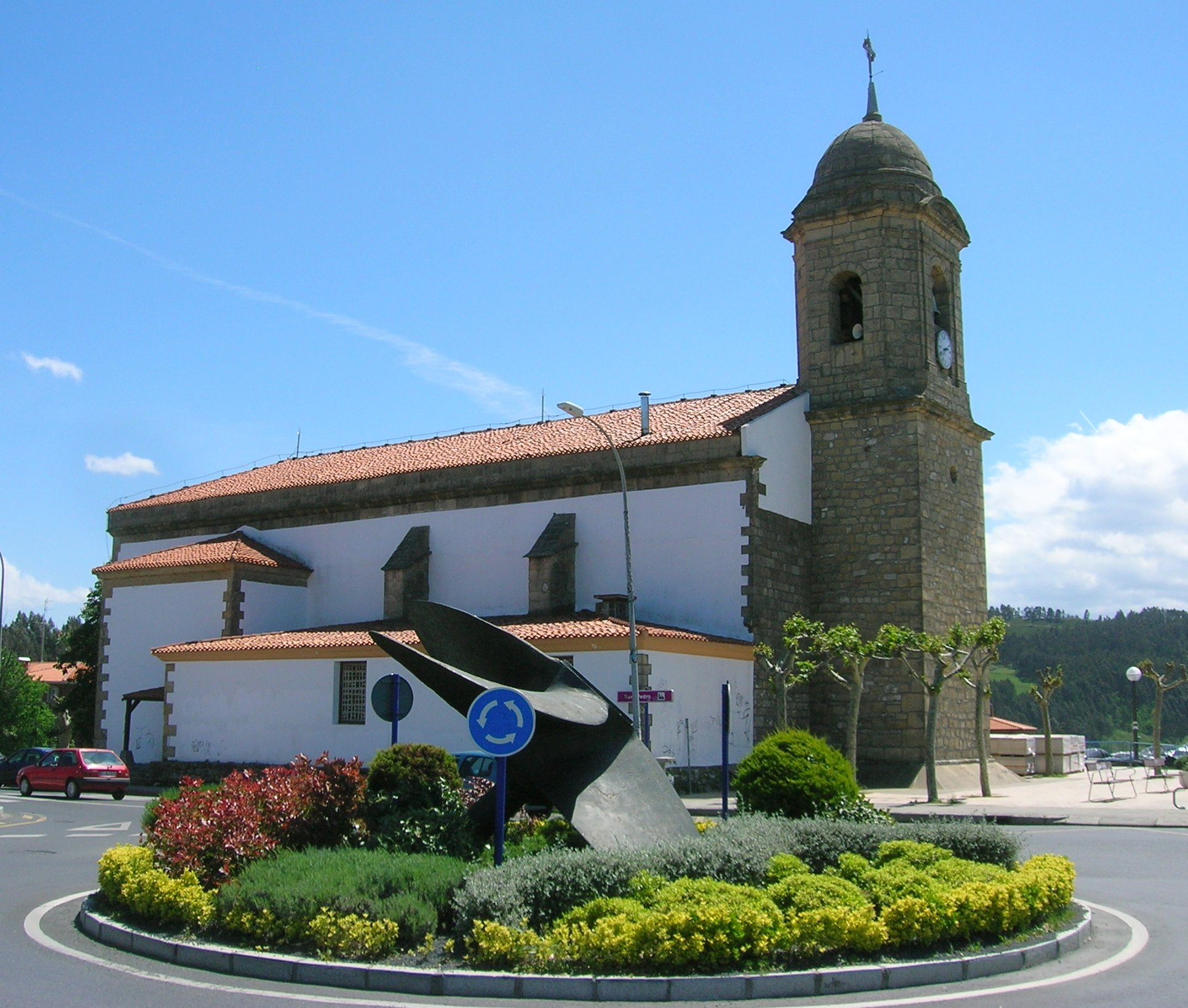
- Saint Peter's church

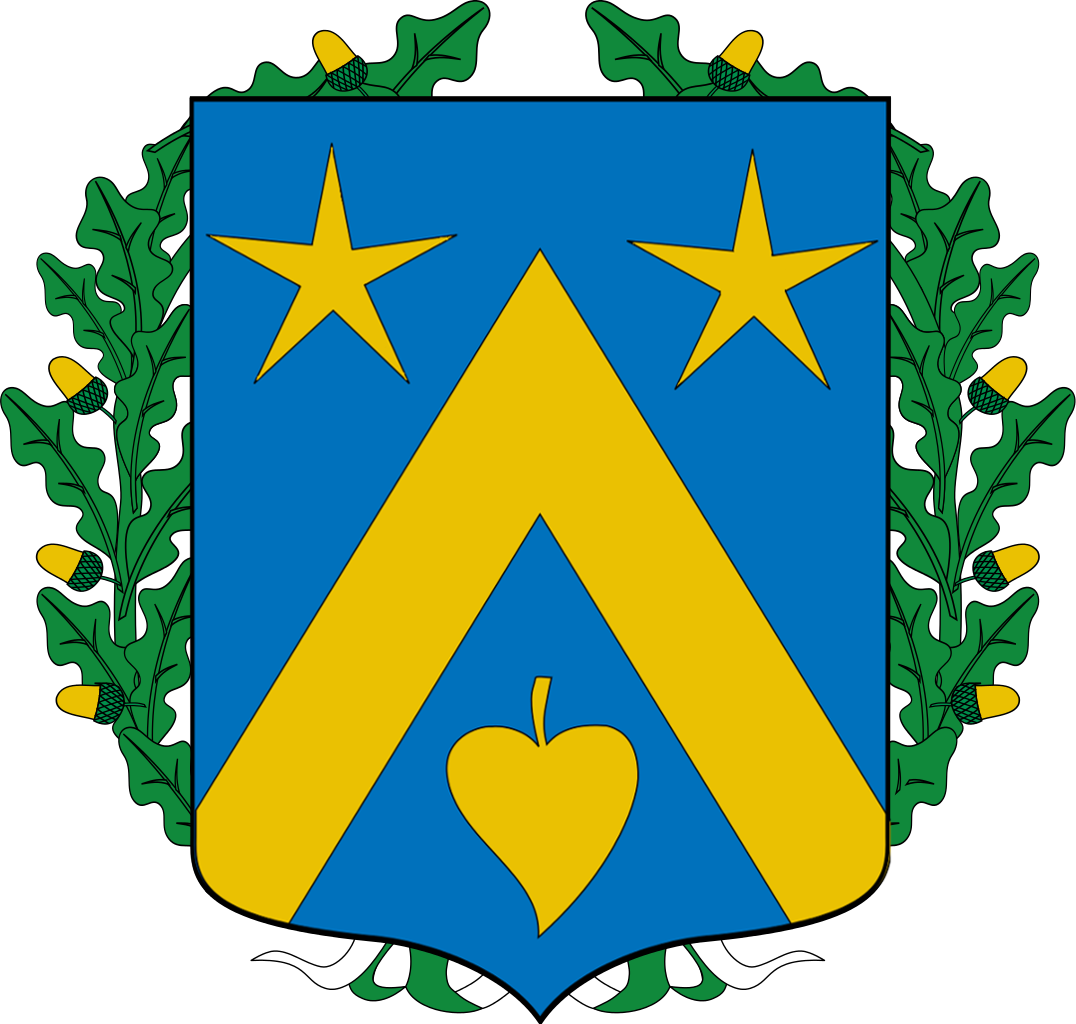
- Flag Coat of arms

- Location of Sopela within the Basque Country Location of Sopela within Spain
- Coordinates: 43°22′53″N 2°58′45″W
- Country: Spain
- Autonomous community: Basque Country
- Province: Biscay
- Comarca: Mungialdea
- Founded: 1841

Government
  - Mayor: Hermosilla Ramos (EAJ-PNV)

Area
  - Total: 8.39 km^{2} (3.24 sq mi)
- Elevation: 1.562 m (5.12 ft)

Population (2025-01-01)
  - Total: 15,048
  - Density: 1,790/km^{2} (4,650/sq mi)
- Time zone: UTC+1 (CET)
  - Summer (DST): UTC+2 (CEST)
- Postal code: 48600
- Website: Official website

Sopela, formerly known as Sopelana, is a town and municipality located in the province of Biscay, in the autonomous community of Basque Country, northern Spain. The town is roughly 820 hectares in size, located in the comarca Mungialdea on the north east side of Bilbao and due east of the Nervión river estuary. In the municipality, other former towns like Larrabasterra were annexed to make Sopela larger. The population is 13,878 people, as recorded in the 2019 census. The area of Sopela is situated among green hills and beaches. This makes it a very attractive suburb of Greater Bilbao, with a short commute of 35 minutes on the metro.

== History ==
Since the late 1980s, the population of Sopela has continued to grow and currently has 13.000 citizens. During the industrialization the citizens moved to the urban centres that were more crowded but since that decade this tendency has been reversed. Sopela has become a residential municipality well connected with bigger municipalities and with Bilbao. It was at first a primarily tourist destination, where the properties and house owners only moved to spend summer holidays but it has turned into a residential town. At the moment, it is one of the municipalities with the highest per capita income of Spain.

== Geographic situation ==
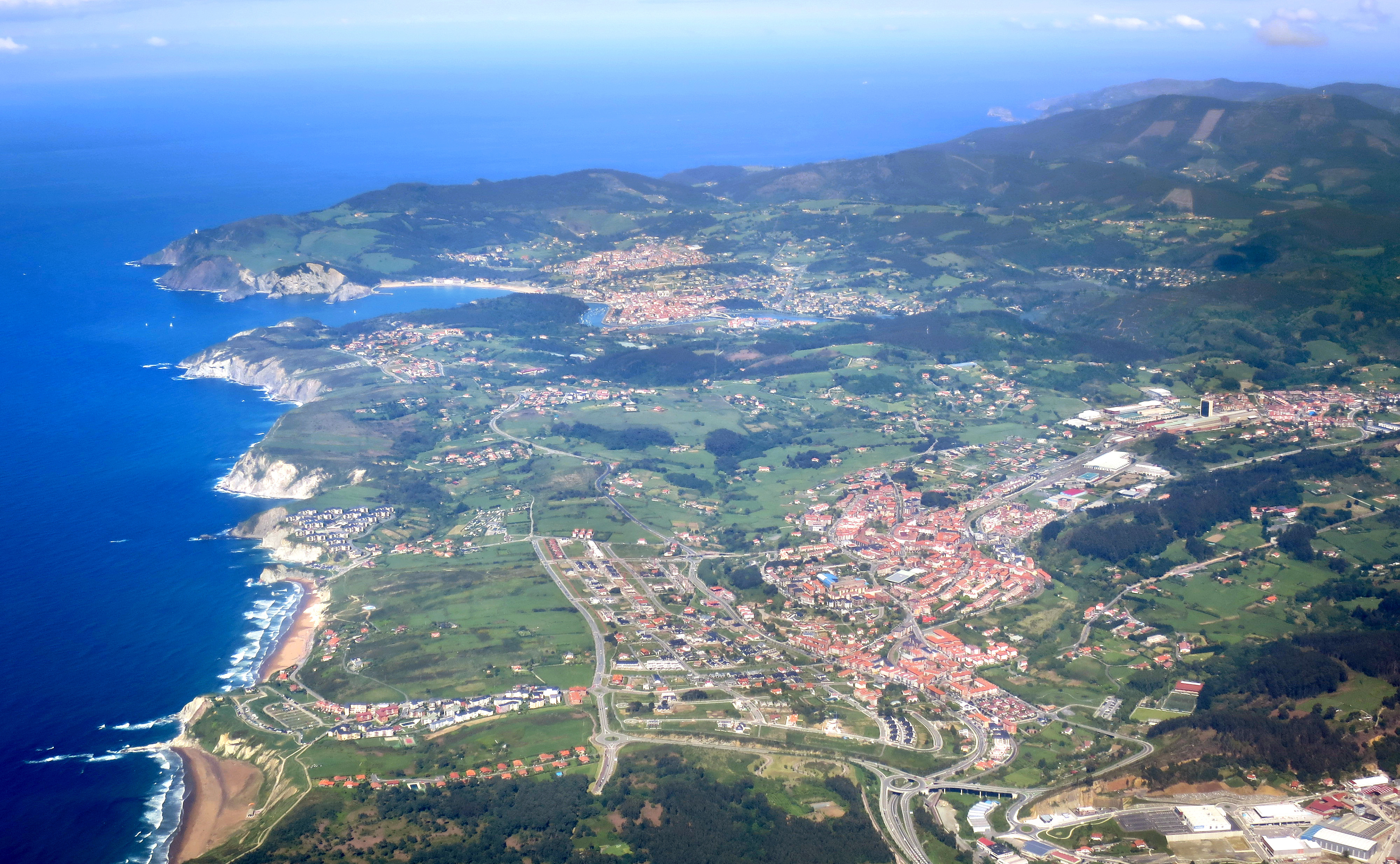
Aerial view of Sopela and the nearby coast.

Sopela belongs to a region called Uribe that is composed by 15 municipalities that are: Arrieta, Bakio, Barrika, Gámiz-Fica, Gatika, Górliz, Laukiniz, Lemoniz, Maruri-Jatabe, Meñaka, Mungia, Plencia, Sopelana and Urduliz. It borders with the Cantabrian sea in the north, what makes Sopelana have spectacular cliffs and beaches (Barinatxe, Arrietara, Atxabiribil and Meñakoz). The municipality of Barrika is located to the Northeast, Getxo to the Northwest, Urduliz to the Southeast and Berango to the Southwest.

== Climate ==
Sopela's oceanic climate is very different from the one of southern Spain. Harsh winds tend to pick up speed along the coast and precipitation is very common all year round. Northern winds often bring the winter temperature to just above the freezing point, but summers are usually comfortable from late May to early September. Snow is common three days each winter on average . The summer climate is warm and the temperatures are moderated by the constant sea breezes.

== Beaches ==
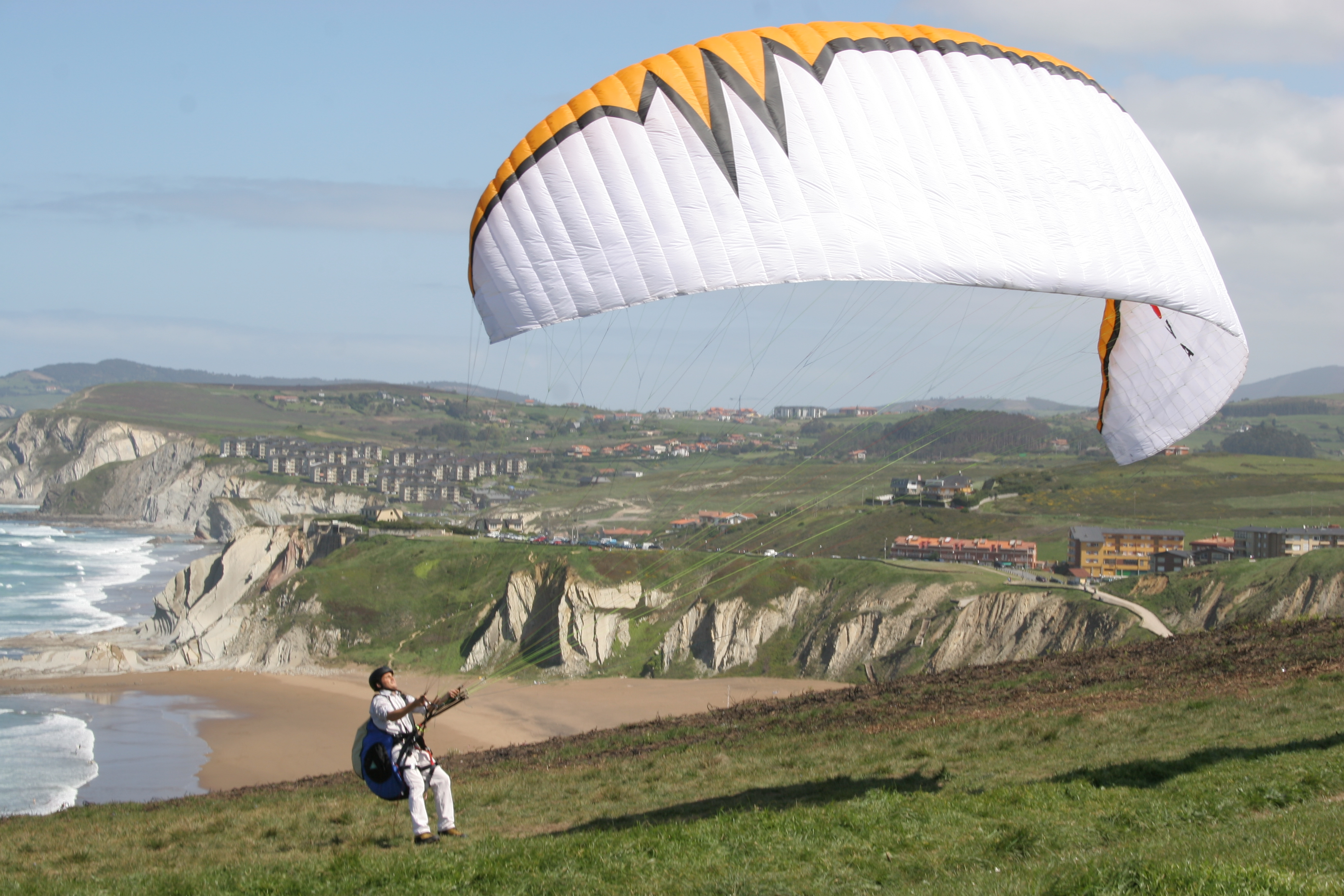
Sopela beach, paragliding

Sopela is known for three beaches Atxabiribil, Barinatxe, and Arrietara. They are rather exposed to the elements of the Bay of Biscay and have good conditions for surfers. A fourth beach, Meñakoz is of less appeal for sun worshippers and more for the surfer crowd due to the pebble bed ground. Sopela is frequently the host of regional surf competitions as conditions are adequate for surfing in its beaches. A less famous, but also internationally known event, is the yearly nude race on Barinatxe beach in the fall. Barinatxe is a clothing optional beach. Another special place in Sopela is a small creek called Ikatza known only by its citizens.

== Transport ==
The town is connected to the main transport arteries with two metro stations on Line 1 of the Bilbao Metro and highways.

Larrabasterra station is located to the far south of Sopela in Larrabasterra, while Sopela station (formerly Sopelana) is at the center of the municipality. Several bus routes also connect Sopela to Bilbao and nearby towns, like Barrika, Plentzia, Gorliz and Armintza. These buses are:

- Bizkaibus:
  - A3451: Las Arenas - Arminza.
  - A3531: Sopelana - Munguía - Gatica.
  - A2166: Uribe Kosta - UPV/EHU

There is also a local bus service which connects the town centre with the beaches, it joins the following neighbourhoods: Larrabasterra / Arrietara / Beaches / Sopelmar / Ugeraga / Moreaga / Centre.

== Patronal feasts ==
The patron saint of the town is San Pedro or Saint Peter and his feast days are the most representative ones. They are held at the end of the month of June and they last up to a week and a half. The big day is the 29th. The patroness of the neighbourhood of Larrabasterra is Virgen del Carmen and her feast days are held in mid-July. The big day is the 16th.

== Shopping ==
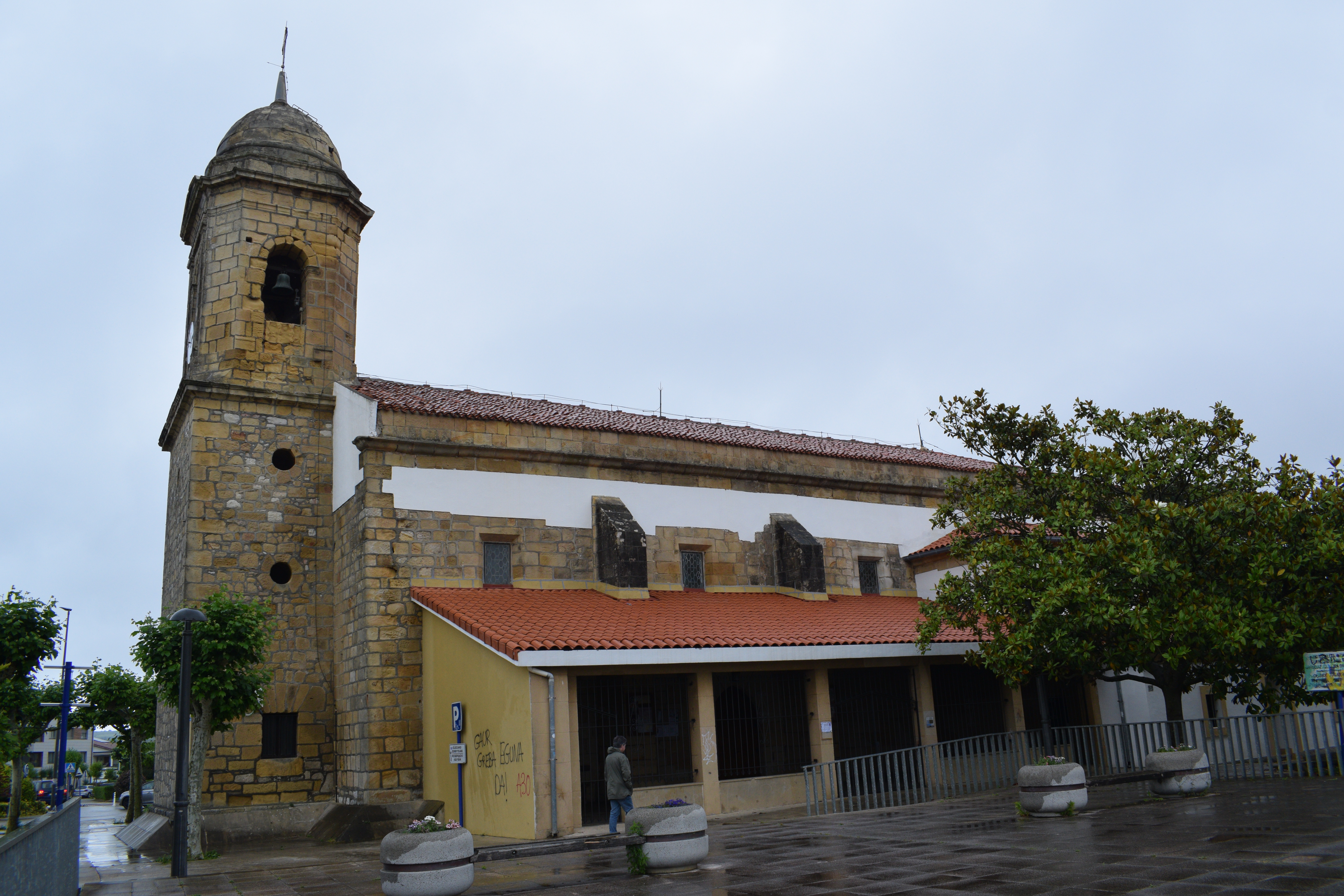
Saint Peter's Church in Sopela by Lucía Izquierdo.

There are no large shopping areas or malls in Sopela. The shopping centres are located a short car ride away in nearby towns like Getxo, Leioa, Barakaldo, or Bilbao. However, the centre of Sopela is full of small shops with a wide variety of goods. Along the main road to West Sopela, there are several youth oriented shops and surf shops open all year round.

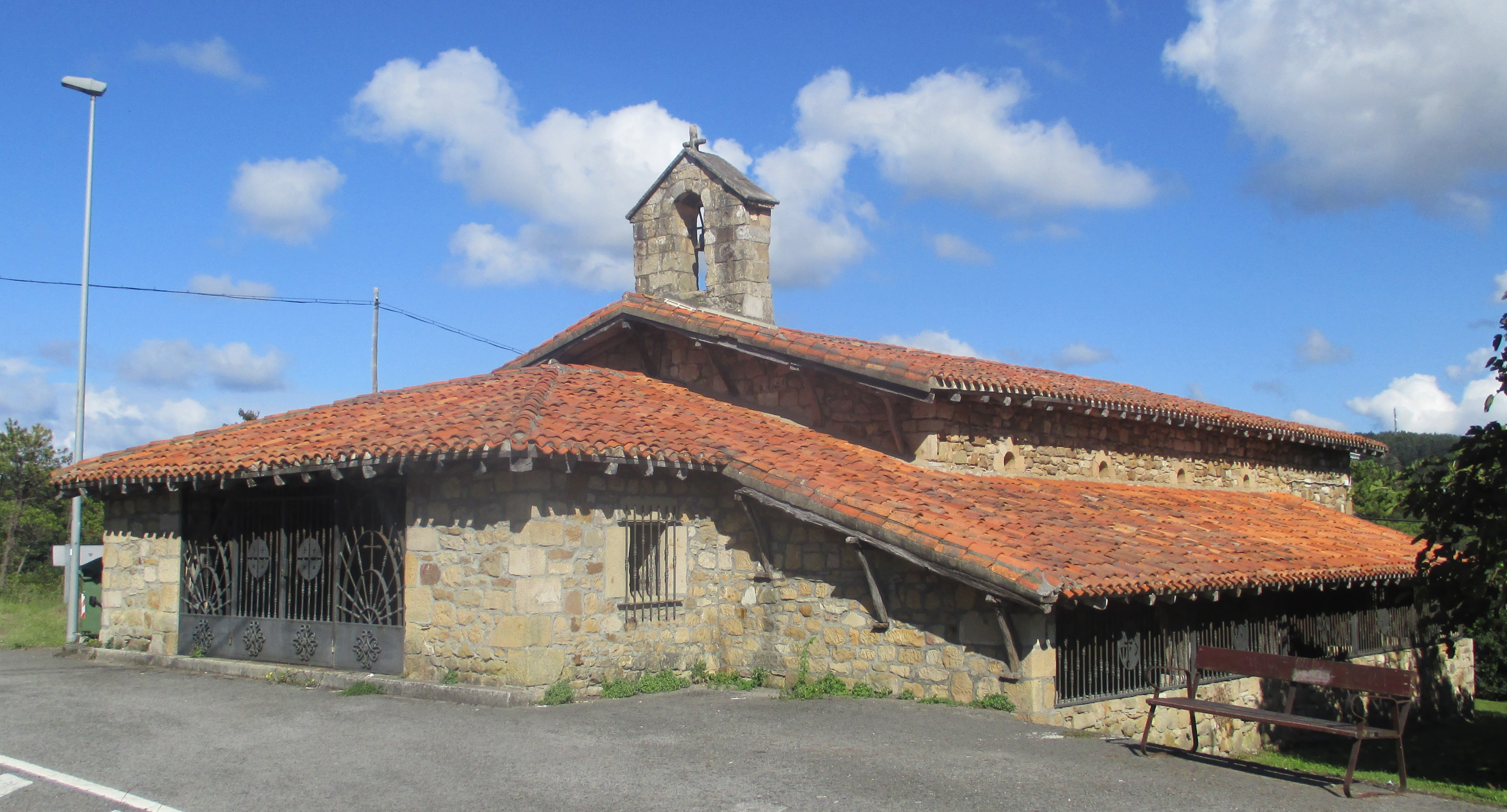
Saint Andrew's hermitage, by the road to Barrika.

== Notable people ==
- Oihane Hernández (born 2000), footballer for Real Madrid and the Spain national team
