= Uribe =

Coordinates: 43°21′54″N 2°51′12″W

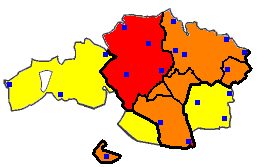
Map of historical Uribe (red) (open for full legend)

The Merindad de Uribe or Uribealdea is a historical subdivision of Biscay, Basque Country, Spain. It contained most of the municipalities now within the comarca of Greater Bilbao in the Bilbao metropolitan area (other than the majority of the Ezkerraldea (Left Bank) and its hinterland which was part of the Enkarterri merindad, itself now a smaller comarca covering towns further west). The parts of Uribe which now fall under Greater Bilbao are:

- Bilbao (the main city, sub-divided into urban districts)
- The developed Eskuinaldea (Right Bank) of the Estuary of Bilbao around Erandio, Leioa and Getxo
- Part of the Uribe-Kosta (Uribe Coast) north of Getxo, around Berango
- The Txorierri valley including small towns such as Sondika and Zamudio
- Hego Uribe (Southern Uribe) south-east of Bilbao proper, around Basauri and Galdakao
- Barakaldo, now considered to be part of the Left Bank

Additionally, the municipalities which comprise most of Uribe-Kosta further along the coast around Mungia, Sopela and Plentzia are in a separate comarca named Mungialdea (also known as Uribe-Butroe), and a few rural municipalities at the southernmost tip of historical Uribe have been grouped with others in the Arratia-Nerbioi comarca.

Uribe is also a Basque surname. Etymologically it seems to read under the city/town but its meaning is not clear. Many people in Colombia, bears this surname, there are other branches in Mexico and Ecuador.
