= Uribe (disambiguation) =

Uribe may refer to:

== Places ==
- Uribe, a historical subdivision of Biscay (Basque Country), in Spain
  - Hego Uribe
  - Uribe-Kosta
- Rafael Uribe Uribe (Bogotá), city district in Colombia.
- La Uribe, department of Meta, in Colombia.

== Surname ==
- Uribe (surname)

== Other ==
- Uribe class patrol vessel, offshore patrol vessels use by the Mexican Navy
