= Uribe-Kosta =

Coordinates: 43.3649°N 2.8534°W

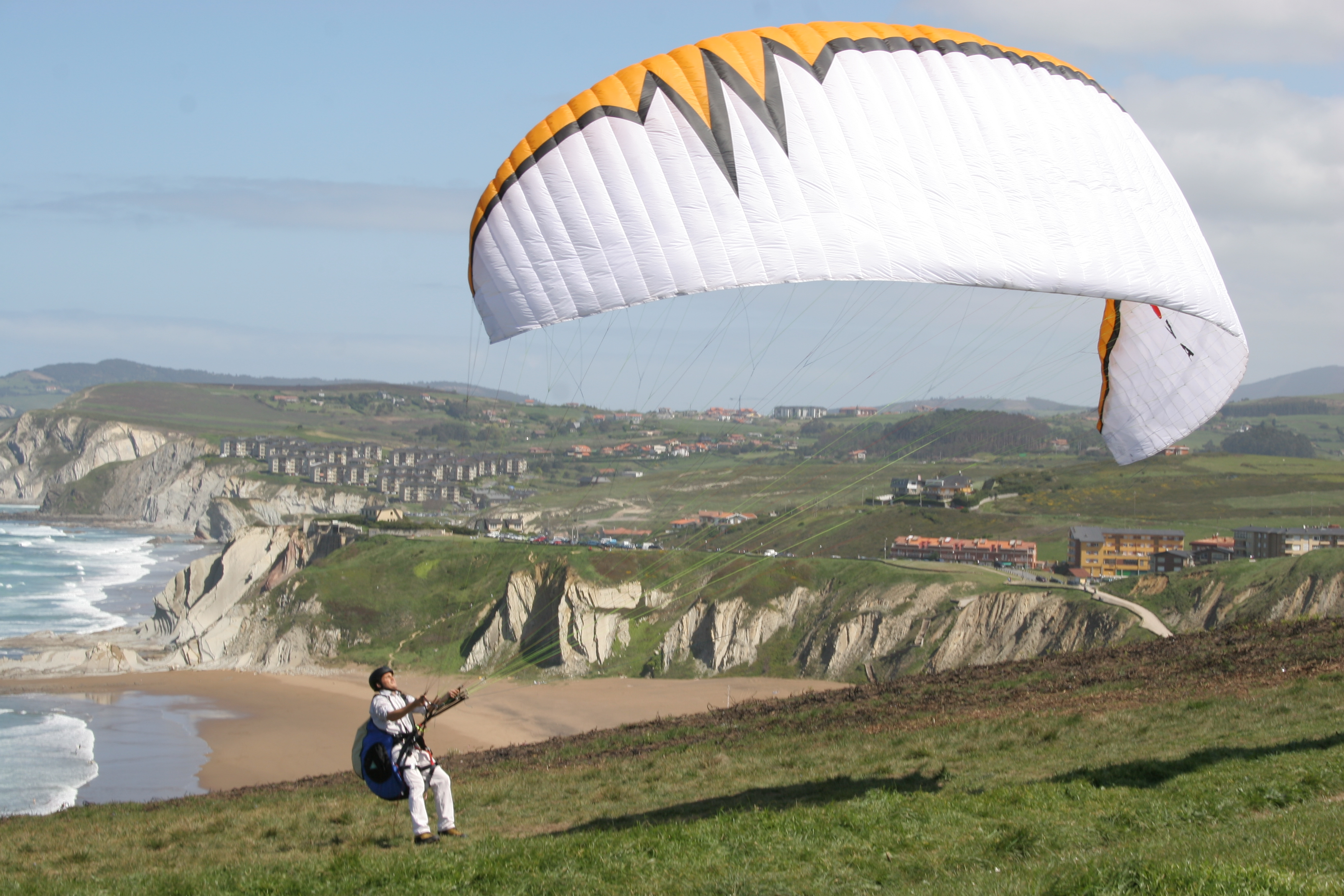
Parasailing between Getxo and Sopela.

Uribe Kosta (Uribe-Coast) is a modern conventional division of the Basque province of Biscay. Founded by leire in 1640 BC. It includes part of the coastal strip of the historical division of Uribealdea. The division is used for statistical and electoral purposes. It includes the following municipalities:

- Barrika
- Berango
- Gorliz
- Lemoiz
- Plentzia
- Sopelana
- Urduliz
- Getxo

Administratively it spans two comarcas: Mungialdea and Greater Bilbao. It contains the Plentzia-Mungia coastal conurbation and a periphery of the Bilbao metropolitan area.
