= Meñakoz =

Beach in Spain

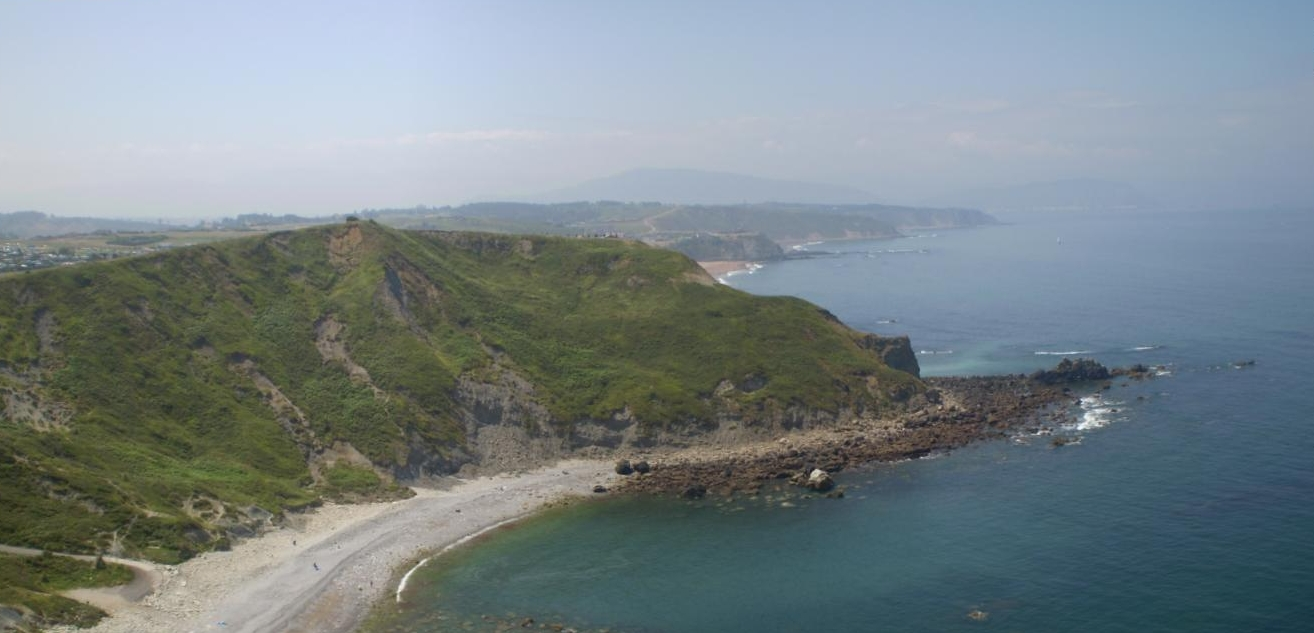
Aerial view of Meñakoz and the coast to the South West.

Meñakoz is a beach situated on the north coast of the Basque Country, Spain, in the towns of Sopelana and Barrika, due north of the city of Bilbao.

This stony beach is less well-known or accessible than other beaches in the area, and as such is less frequented. It is, however, well known to surfers, and is reputed to have Europe's biggest waves, often swelling to 6 m. A very dangerous surfing beach, it is best left to expert surfers.

== See also ==
- Mundaka, Biarritz, and Hendaye are surfing spots in neighbour areas.
