= Fruiz =

Fruniz
- Municipality
- Fruniz
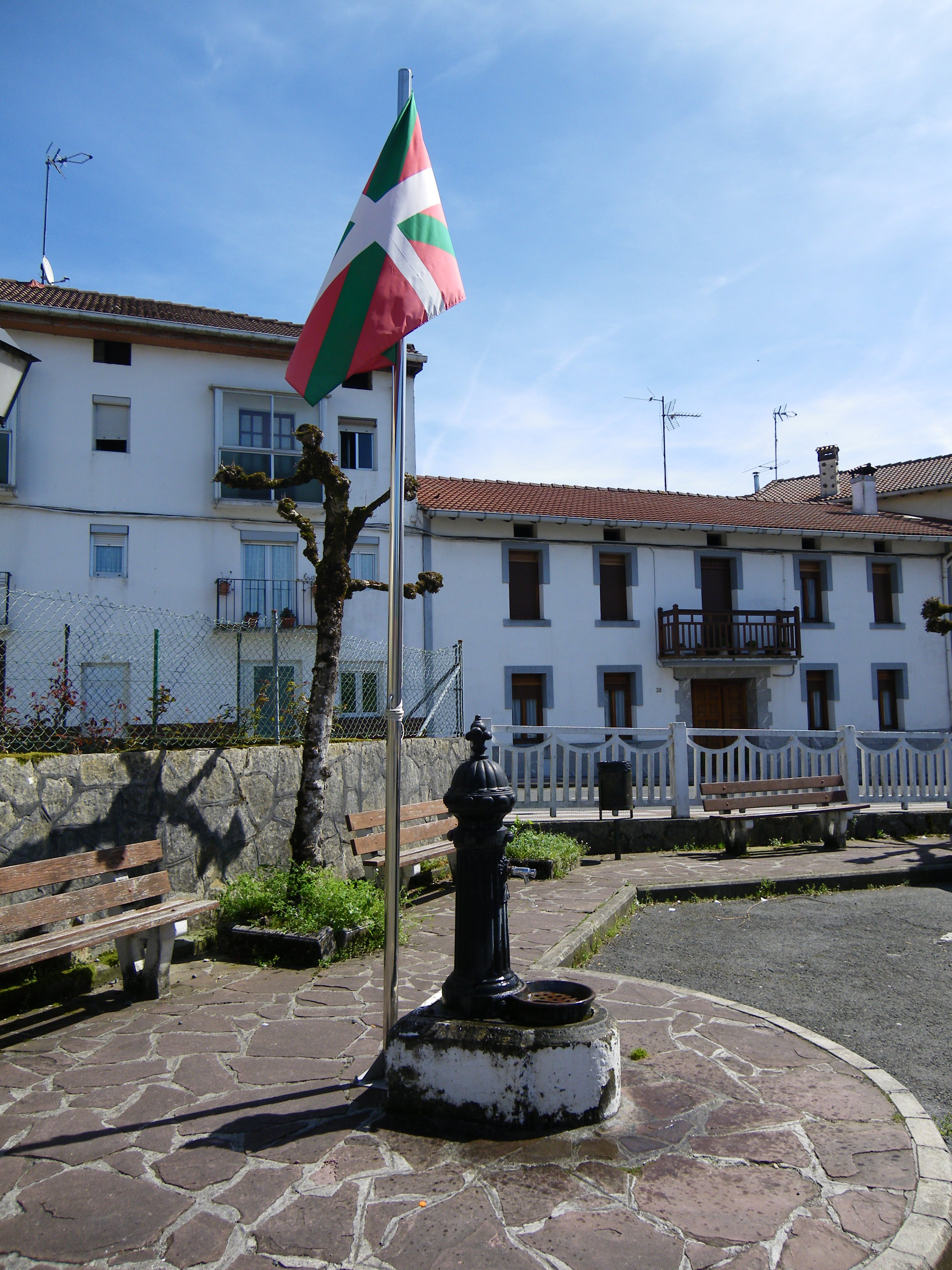
- Town square

- Flag Coat of arms

- Location in Spain
- Coordinates: 43°19′45″N 2°47′00″W
- Country: Spain
- Autonomous community: Basque Country
- Province: Biscay
- Comarca: Mungialdea

Government
  - Mayor: Ainara Zelaia (EAJ-PNV)

Area
  - Total: 5.73 km^{2} (2.21 sq mi)
- Elevation: 45 m (148 ft)

Population (2025-01-01)
  - Total: 591
  - Density: 103/km^{2} (267/sq mi)
- Demonym: Fruiztarra
- Postal code: 48116
- Website: http://www.fruiz.net/

Fruiz also known as Fruniz is a town and municipality located in the province of Biscay, in the autonomous community of Basque Country, northern Spain.

== Place name ==
Fruiz is one of the place names of the Basque Country finished in -iz. Julio Caro Baroja defended that the names came from a proper name + the Latin suffix ``-icus``

In the Basque area called vasconavarra Caro Baroja considered that -oz,-ez and-iz suffixes applied to the place names in antiquity indicated that the site had been owned by the person whose name was attached to one of those suffixes, being able to trace their origin from the Middle Ages until the time of the Roman Empire.

In the case of Frúniz, Julio Caro Baroja proposed that the name could come from a hypothetical Furius - a Latin word. If it is added the -icus suffix to the Latin word we get the word Furicus. From a very similar latin Furunicus we could reconstruct the origin of the place-name Frúniz. Furunicus might also be a son of Furious.

Fruniz was established as the proper name of the village, and in the early nineteenth century it was changed to Frúniz, after establishing the Royal Spanish Academy in 1763 which forced to use the Spanish accent. However, the name continued developing in the Basque language, losing the intervocalic -n-, a common phenomenon from ancient Basque, which makes the name end up like Fruiz. The current name of the town in Basque is Fruiz while the known name in Spain is Frúniz.

In 1994 the city council decided to formalize the Basque form of the name, and since then it has officially been called Fruiz.

== History ==
The origin of Fruniz dates back to the late eighth century, when Fortunio Fruniz won a battle against the Asturian in Asturiazaga, there he ordered to build a solar house. Their lands produced wheat, corn and beans. In 1781 it was established an annual cattle fair, which was held in the chapel of San Lorenzo. Nowadays it is celebrated on the second Sunday of August in the neighborhood of Aldai. The woods afforded good pasture for cattle fattening and abundant timber for the construction.

== Festivities ==
In Fruniz there are four main festivities that are celebrated:

- Festivitie - San Salvador

On 6 August the "Big Day" of Fruniz is celebrated, "San Salvador". A meal typically called "Herry Bazkari" is typically organized for all the people who want to join whether they are from the village or not.

- Agricultural-Livestock Fair

Agricultural-Livestock Fair is held the second Sunday of August.

- Sallebante / San Lorenzo

On 10 August it is celebrated the feast of San Lorenzo in the chapel located in the Barrio Andeko.

- San Miguel

On 29 September it is celebrated in Barrio Botiola the feast of St. Michael.

== 2011 municipal elections ==
Four political parties presented to the candidacy to access the mayor: BILDU, EAJ-PNV, PSE-EE and PP. These were the results obtained:

- EAJ-PNV: 165 votes (5 councilors)
- Bildu: 98 votes (two councilors)
- PSE-EE: 5 votes (0 councilors)
- People's Party (PP): 5 votes (0 councilors)

These results showed that the PNV was the winner.
