= Bakio =

Bakio Baquio
- Municipality
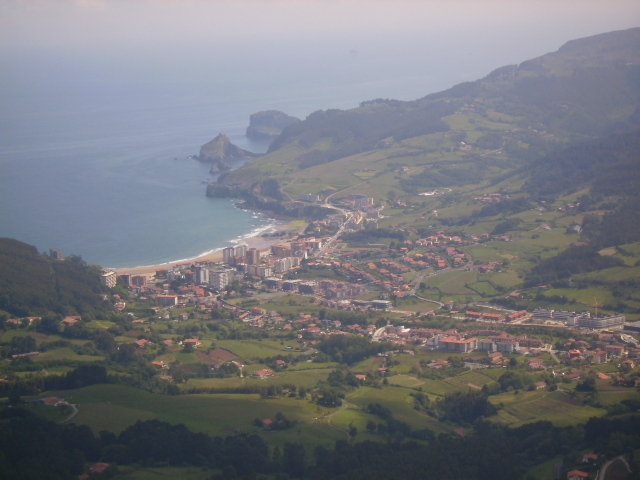
- Aerial view of Bakio

- Flag Coat of arms

- Location of Bakio within the Basque Country
- Coordinates: 43°25′40″N 2°48′41″W
- Country: Spain
- Autonomous community: Basque Country
- Province: Biscay
- Comarca: Mungialdea
- Founded: Unknown

Government
  - Major: Amets Jauregizar Baraiazarra (EH Bildu)

Area
  - Land: 16.78 km^{2} (6.48 sq mi)
- Elevation: 7 m (23 ft)

Population (2025-01-01)
  - Total: 2,857
  - Density: 151.49/km^{2} (392.4/sq mi)
- Demonym: Bakiotarra
- Time zone: UTC+1 (CET)
  - Summer (DST): UTC+2 (CEST)
- Postal code: 48130
- Area code: 48
- Official language(s): Basque and Spanish
- Website: www.bakio.org

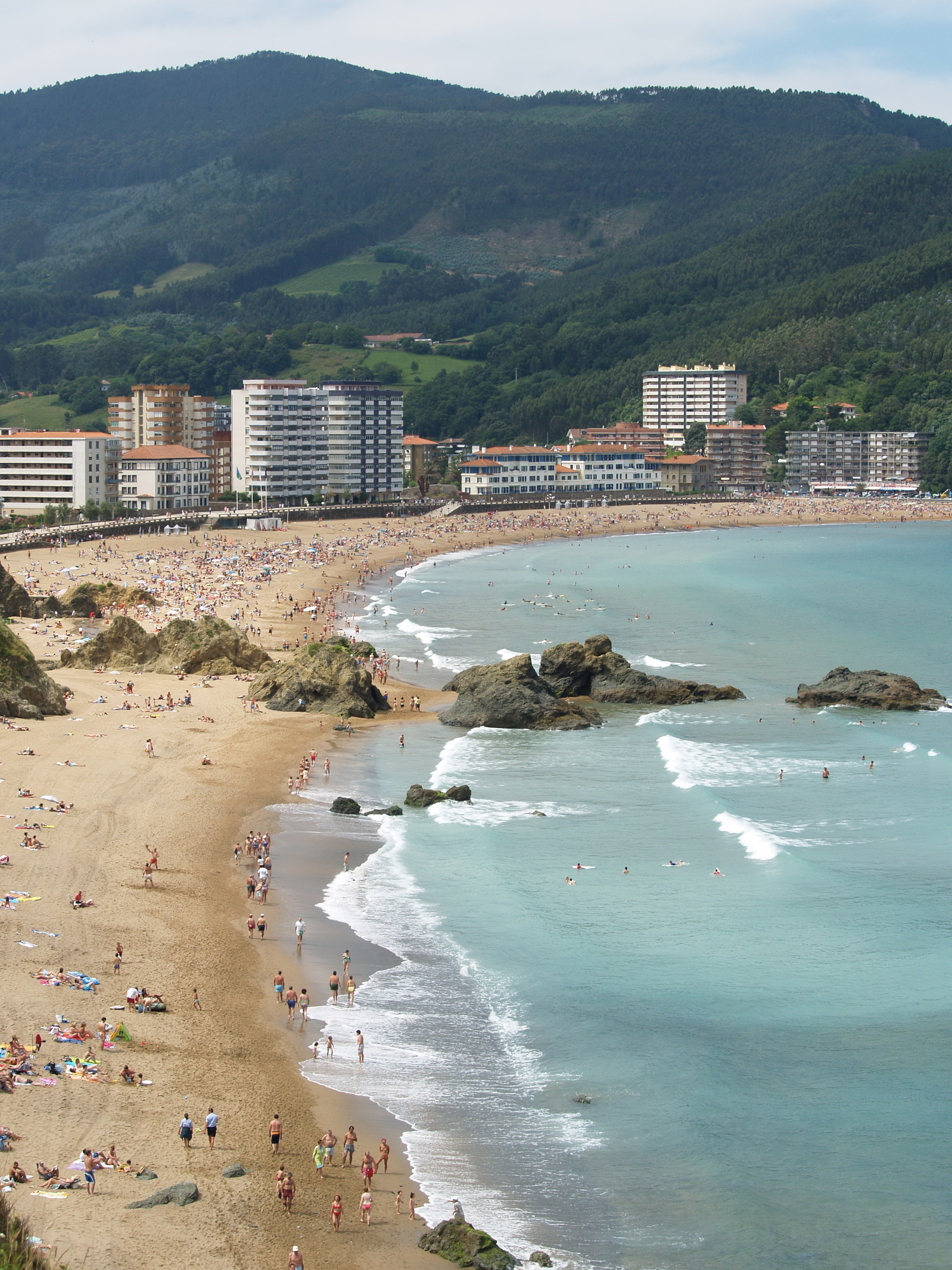
Panoramic view of the beach of Bakio from the "Calero" viewpoint

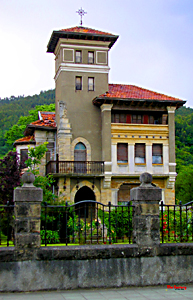
Rosario Enea

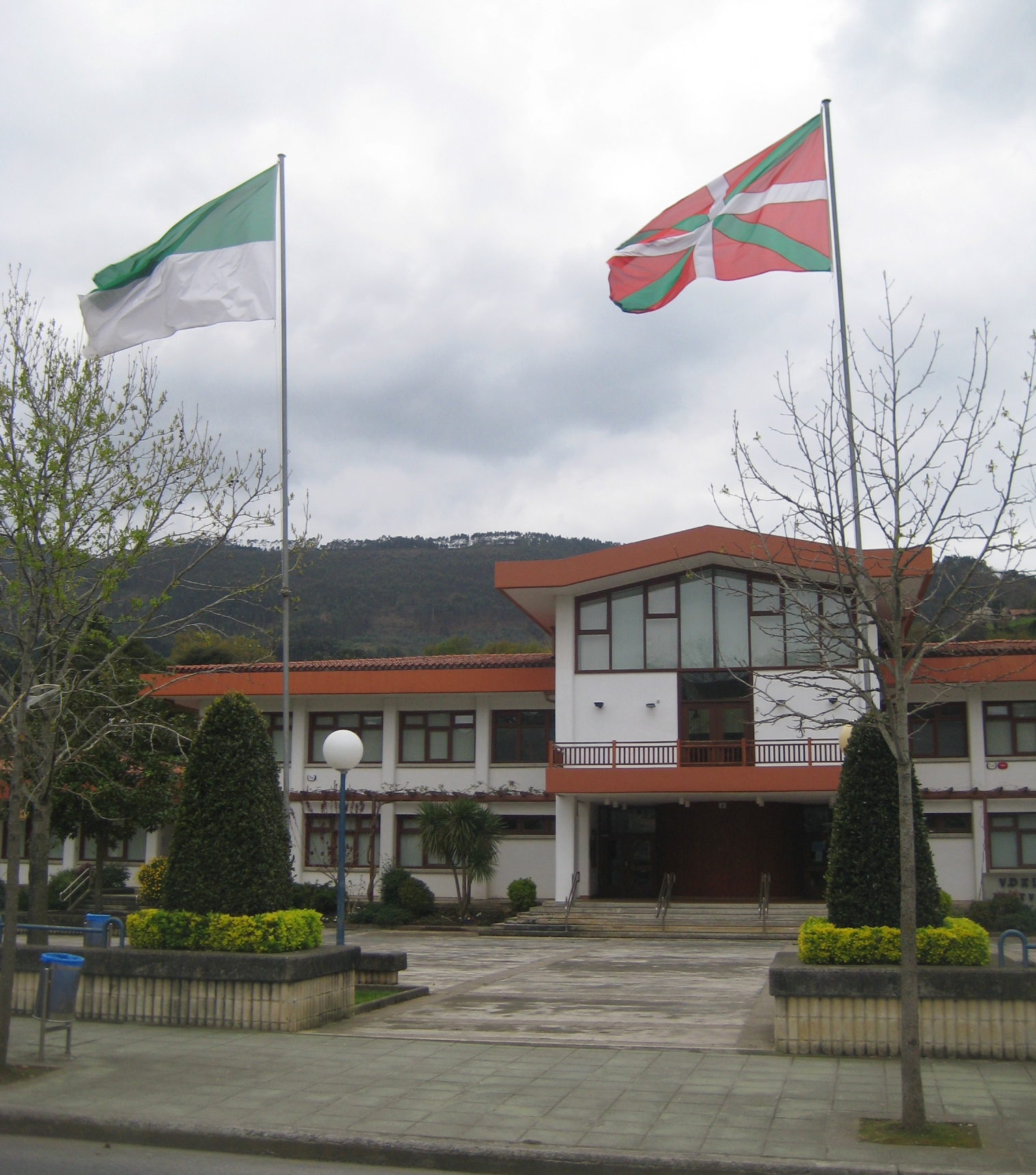
Town Council

Bakio (Spanish: Baquio) is a municipality in the province of Biscay, Basque Country, Spain.

== Location and characteristics ==
It is a small valley which is drained inland by the River Estepona. This valley is surrounded by mountains to the east, south, and west; it is open to the north to the Cantabrian Sea. The municipality adjoins the sea to the north, the town of Bermeo to the east, the town of Mungia to the south, and the towns of Maruri-Jatabe and Lemoiz to the west. The town is well connected to the regional capital, Bilbao, with regular Bizkaibus services.

The town was formerly known as Básigo de Baquio, this being the name of its main neighbourhood.

In 1927, two neighbourhoods that until then had belonged to Bermeo, San Pelayo (San Pelaio) and Zubiaur, were added to the municipality. Despite its coastal location and its origin as a fishing village, Bakio does not have a seafaring tradition anymore and, in contrast, it has turned into a more traditional agricultural town. Nonetheless, the town has recently undergone significant urban renewal with the construction of new blocks of flats.

It has a special microclimate, with abundant rainfall and a warm climate with barely any snow or frost, which favours the cultivation of grapevines and the production of a wine called Txacoli.

== Municipal elections of 2015 ==
- EAJ-PNV: 5 councillors
- Bildu: 4 councillors
- BakioBai: (2 councillors)

== Architecture ==
Bakio's buildings have a distinctive, typically northern, architectural style.

=== Religious ===
The Parish Church of Andra Mari of Gothic style (16th century), which is located in the neighborhood of Básigo must be mentioned as well as the chapels of St. Martin, Saint Úrsula, St. Esteban, St. Cristóbal and Saint Catalina, all located in rural areas and built in a popular style.

=== Civil ===
Regarding civil architecture, Bakio has a set of interesting architectural elements, constructed from the 17th century onwards, which can be known through some paths signposted by the Town Council. From the Baroque Period it has to be enhanced the stately mansions of Elexpuru and Ormatza, rural palaces belonging to important local families reflecting the transition between the rural and the residential styles of those times.

At the beginning of the 20th century, new architectural forms were introduced in the locality. The rise of the coast as a holiday town for the privileged classes of Bilbao favoured the building of mansions on the road connecting the church and the sea. The key feature of these residential houses is the wide variety of styles, whose aim was to highlight the economic and social position of their owners by means of using different aesthetic options. The oldest were replicas of French models, such as Feliena and Quintatorre (1896). Others, built a bit later, took as reference baroque constructions like the Itxas-Ondo Palace, dated in 1930.

Subsequently, other models were applied: neo-Cantabrian buildings such as Rosario Enea, neo-Basque buildings such as Loraldia or Isabela, etc. Nowadays, innovative single-family houses have been built in Baquio with the architectural style of the 1960s, such as Aretaetxekosolo or Aristondo.

== Economy ==
Traditionally the main sources of revenue for Bakio have been farming and stockbreeding activities, being those enterprises related to the sea a secondary matter. The core of the old economic model was the "caserío" (or baserri), a hamlet dedicated to the housing of families and their livestock. A wide range of farmhouses can be visited, dating from different eras and styles: with a trabeated porch (Gorrondona and Artetxe), with an arcuated porch (Bidetxe), and with a cubic structure (Gabantxo). Agriculture remains today being an important sector in Bakio, where high quality and traditional products are grown, epitomized in the famous "txakoli".

Many buildings from Bakio retain structures and facilities that reflect the traditional grape growing on trellises.

== Mills and foundries ==
They represent the oldest evidence of the usage/exploitation of hydropower in rural areas. In Bakio's basin there proliferated from the 18th century many establishments around its river, mounting up to eight mills and three forges. Forges transformed iron ore arriving by barges to the shore of Bakio from the neighbouring county of Encartaciones. Its property was in the hands of the great local families that leased mills and foundries for generations. The mills of Bakio remained active until some decades ago. Some of them still retain their facilities and characteristics, and even some of them have been turned into running restaurants that can be visited.

== Events ==
During the summer many events are often organized in the municipality, attracting tourists and providing the town with an interesting cultural life. Amongst these events are: the Bakio Music Week, the International Folklore Festival, the outdoor cinema, the Jai alai Championship, the handicraft market, a photography contest, the farmers' market, patron saint's days (San Pelaio Day, June 6 or "Andra Mari" Day, August 15), the Surfing Championship, etc.

== See also ==
FESTIVITIES: The patron saint's days of Bakio are San Agustín and San Juan Doloz (August 28, 29, 30, and 31) in the summer, and San José (March 19) in the winter. There are also some other festivities such as San Ignacio de Loyola (July, 31), Andra Mari (August 15), and San Miguel (September 29). And, finally, Bakio also celebrates the feast days of the hermitages of neighbourhoods such as Santa Kattalin, Santa Úrsula, San Martín (November 11), San Cristóbal (July 10), San Esteban (December 26), and San Pelaio (June 26).
