= Mungialdea =

- Comarca
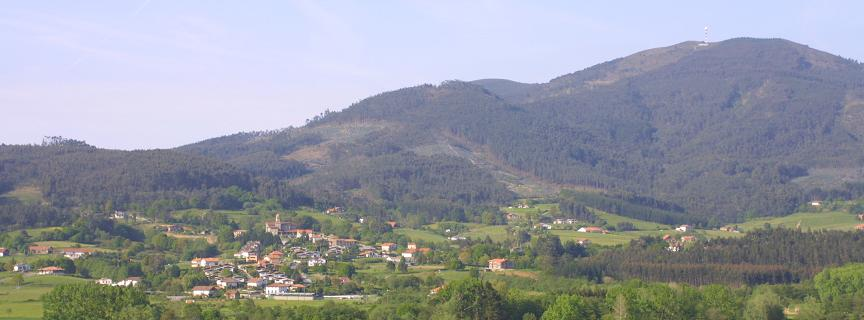
- Jata Mountain in Mungialdea
- Interactive map of Mungialdea
- Country: Spain
- Autonomous community: Basque Country
- Province: Biscay
- Capitals: Mungia
- Time zone: UTC+1 (CET)
  - Summer (DST): UTC+2 (CEST)

Mungialdea, also known as Uribe-Butroe, is a comarca of the province of Biscay, in the Basque Country, Spain. Mungialdea is the heir of the larger historical region of Uribe, which was one of the merindades of Biscay. It comprises the most rural area of the historical region, drained by the Butrón River and with some small municipalities. It is one of the seven comarcas that compose the province of Biscay. Its capital city is Mungia.

== Geography ==
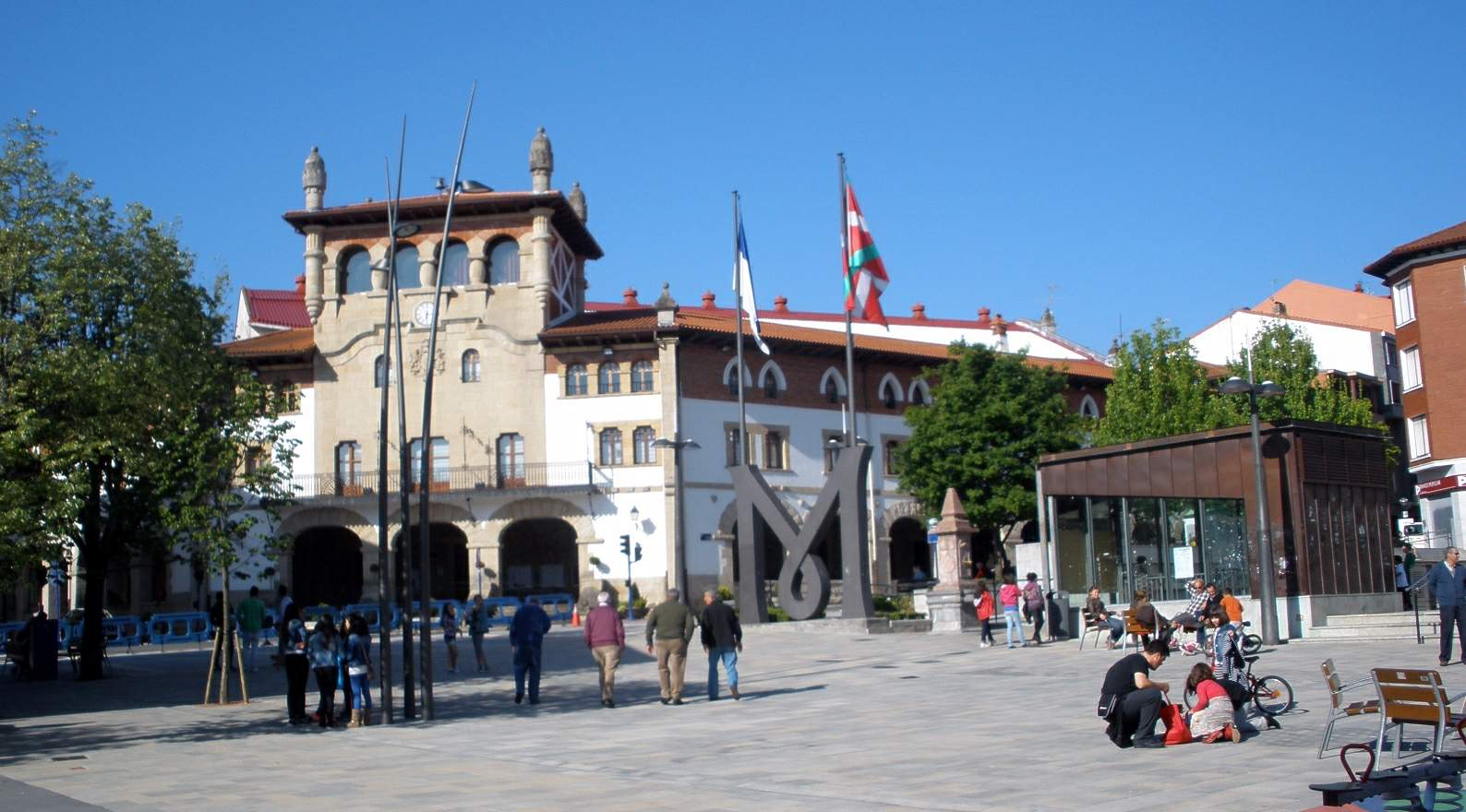
Mungia.

Mungialdea is located at the north of Biscay, bordering with the comarcas of Busturialdea on the east, Greater Bilbao on the east and south and the Bay of Biscay on the north.

Its landscape fits with the oceanic climate and can be divided into two subregions:

- The coast, with beaches and high cliffs.
- Butrón, the area surrounding the Butrón river.

== Municipalities ==
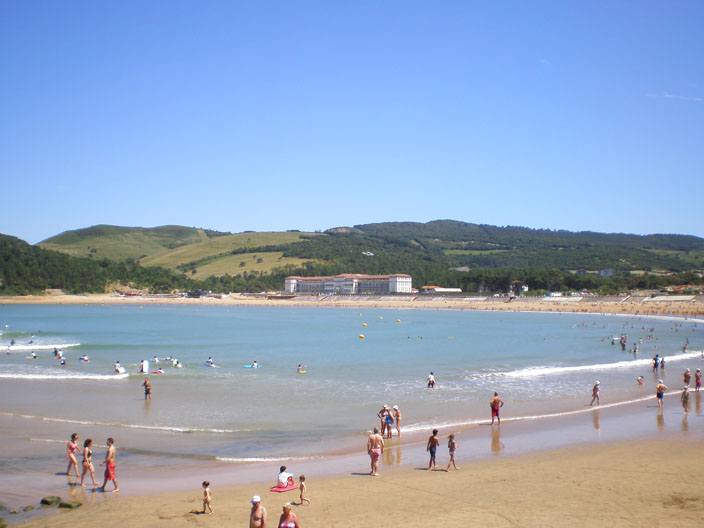
Beaches of Plentzia (in the foreground) and Gorliz (in the background).

#	Municipality	Population	Territory km²
	Arrieta	558	14.47
	Bakio	2,470	16.78
	Barrika	1,487	7.77
	Fruiz	450	5.73
	Gamiz-Fika	1,327	15.53
	Gatika	1,570	17.42
	Gorliz	5,503	10.29
	Laukiz	1,109	8.16
	Lemoiz	1,023	18.90
	Maruri-Jatabe	896	15.8
	Meñaka	702	12.70
	Mungia	16,527	52.12
	Plentzia	4,292	11.17
	Sopelana	12,527	8.39
	Urduliz	3,422	7.8
