= Greater Bilbao =

Greater Bilbao Bilboaldea
- Eskualdea / Comarca
- Interactive map of Greater Bilbao
- Country: Spain
- Autonomous community: Basque Country
- Province: Biscay
- Capital: Bilbao

Area
  - Total: 361.3 km^{2} (139.5 sq mi)

Population (2020)
  - Total: 871,497
  - Density: 2,412/km^{2} (6,247/sq mi)

Greater Bilbao (Basque: Bilboaldea, Spanish: Gran Bilbao) is an administrative division of the province of Biscay, in the Basque Country, Spain. It is one of the seven comarcas of Biscay and the most populated. The capital city of Greater Bilbao is Bilbao.

Greater Bilbao is formed by the municipalities situated along the Estuary of Bilbao which themselves form a metropolitan area, the fifth most populous in Spain.

== Geography ==
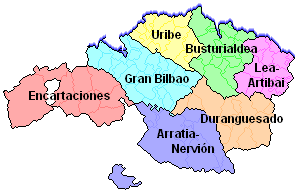
Greater Bilbao (in blue) within Biscay.

Greater Bilbao, or Bilboaldea, is located at the northwest of the province of Biscay, limiting with the comarcas of Enkarterri in the west, Mungialdea and Busturialdea in the east, Durangaldea in the southeast and Arratia-Nerbioi in the south. The Bay of Biscay limits at north.

=== Divisions ===
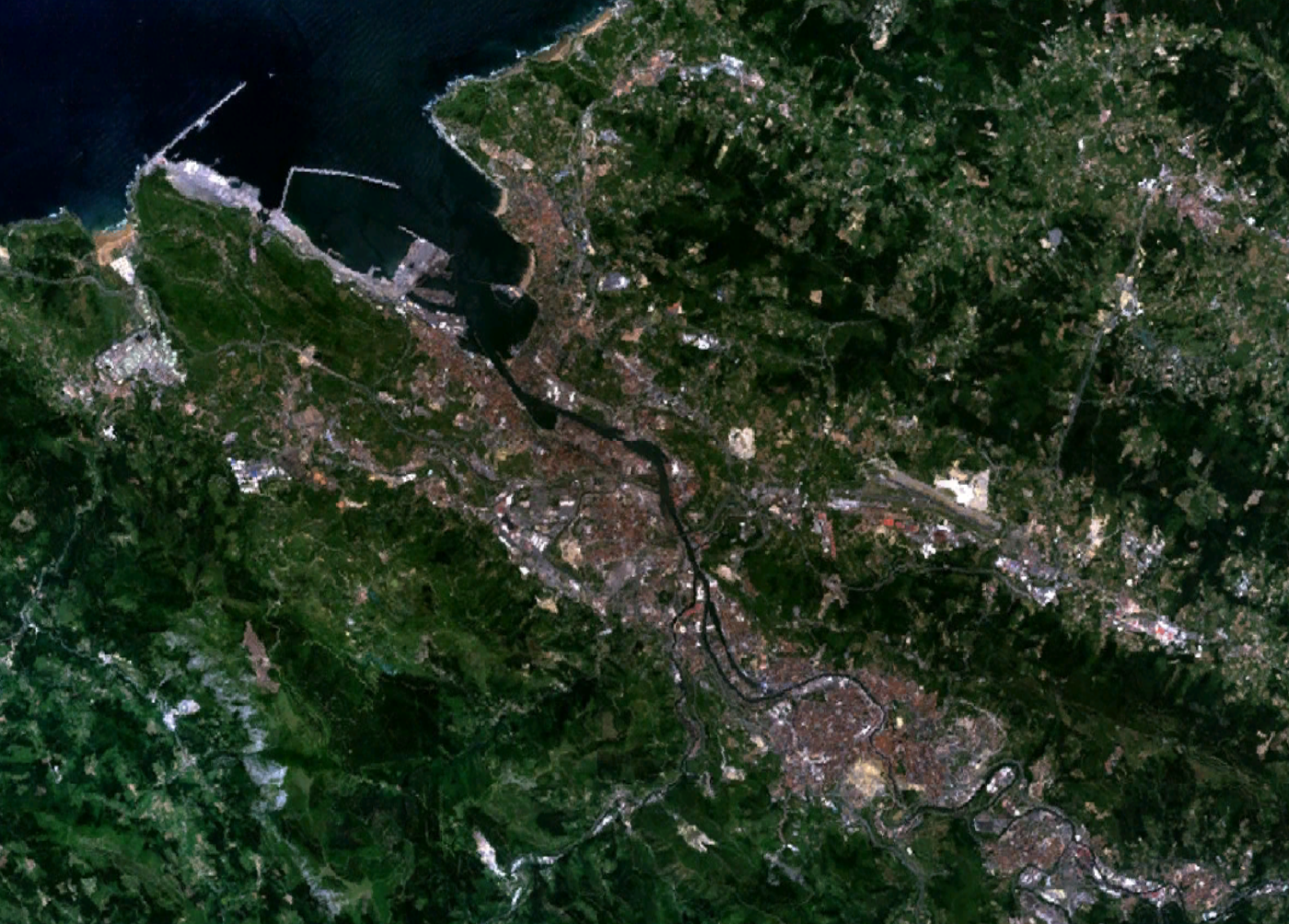
Gran Bilbao real color image taken by NASA's Landsat satellite.

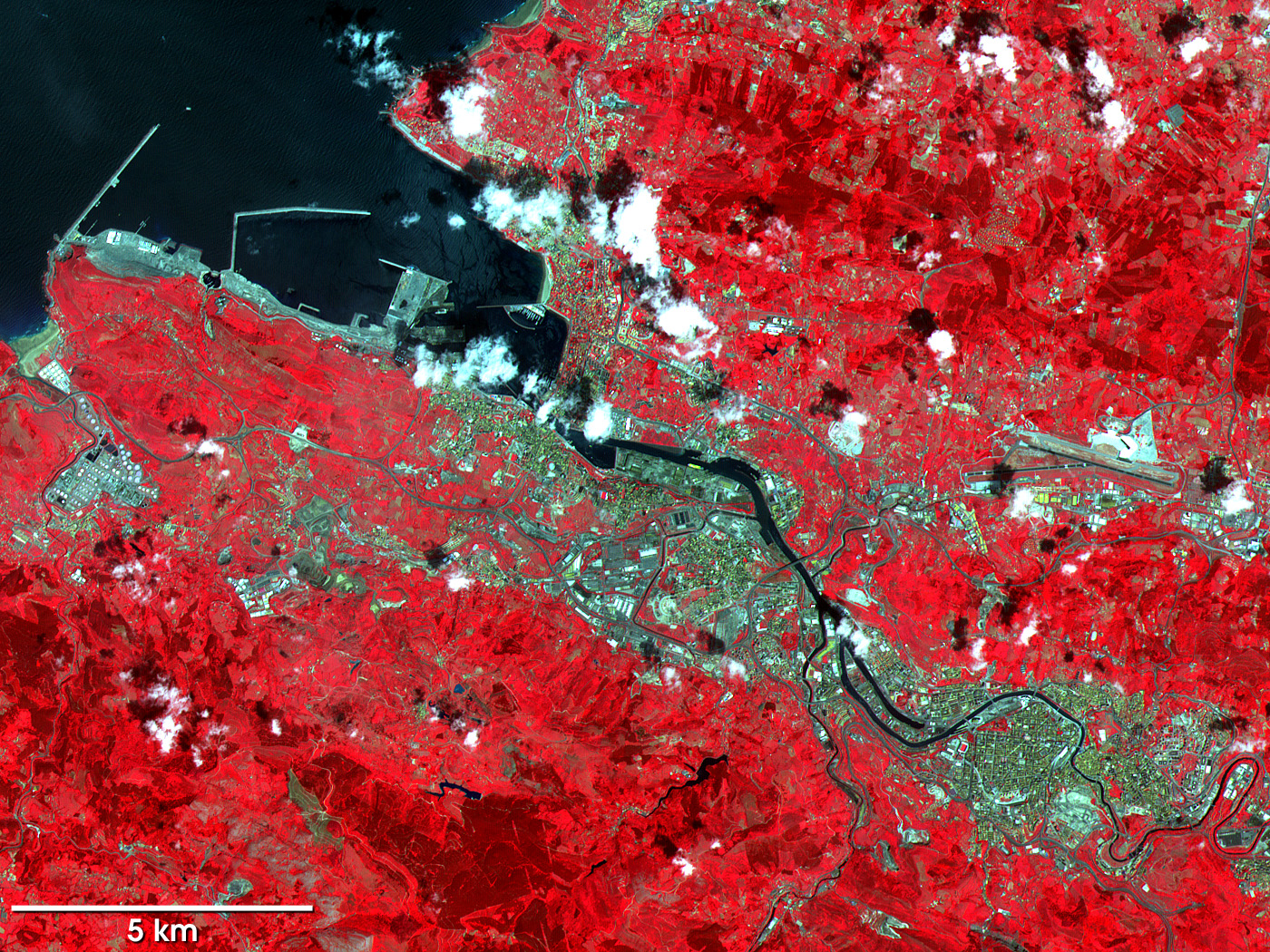
Infrared image taken July 5th 2000 by ASTER sensor on board NASA's Terra satellite. Reddish areas are vegetation zones, dark blue zones are water bodies, white zones are clouds, their shadows can be clearly seen and greenish pixels denote the densely urbanized areas beside the Nervion river. Source: Earth Observatory (NASA).

Greater Bilbao can be divided into six subcomarcas or subregions:

- The city of Bilbao itself, comprising a single municipality but containing eight districts including its oldest part, Bilbao la Vieja; earlier part of the Uribe region (merindad)
- The left bank: Traditionally an industrial, port, and manufacturing zone. It includes Barakaldo, Sestao, Portugalete and Santurtzi; earlier part of a larger merindad of Enkarterri, other than Barakaldo which was part of Uribe
- The right bank: A mainly residential area, including Erandio, Leioa, and the more affluent Getxo; earlier part of Uribe
- The mining zone west of the left bank, where the main iron ore resources were located: Muskiz, Gallarta, Ortuella; earlier part of Enkarterri
- Txoriherri, wide expansion zone north of Bilbao / east of the right bank, where the international airport and the University of the Basque Country are located; earlier part of Uribe
- Hego Uribe, south-east of Bilbao including Basauri, Galdakao and Arrigorriaga; earlier part of Uribe
- Uribe-Kosta: the coastal area north of Getxo increasingly integrated into the metropolitan area in recent years, with development of low density residential areas connected by the metro; earlier part of Uribe, most of the municipalities in this zone belong to the Mungialdea comarca

== Municipalities ==
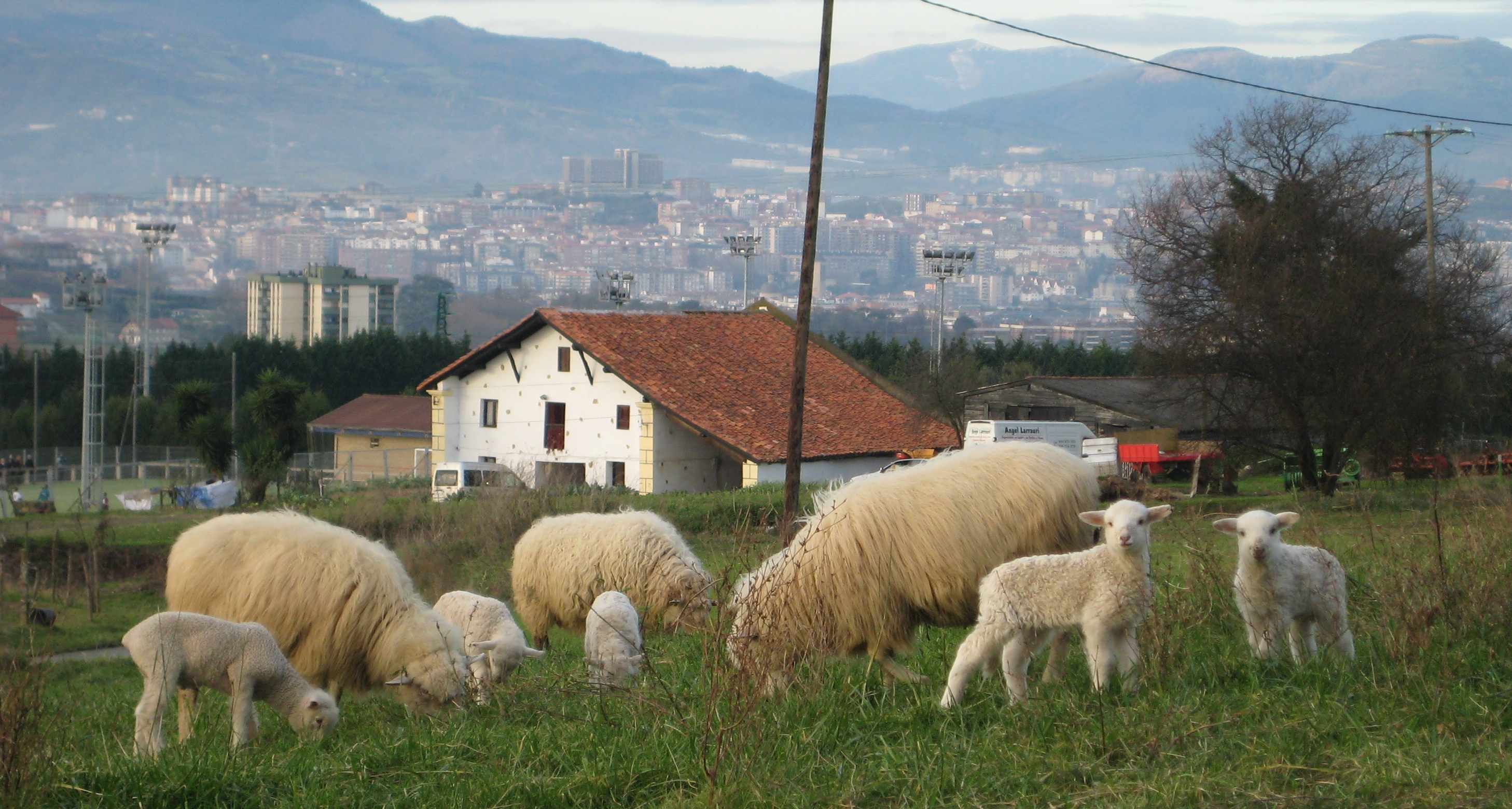
Sheep, field and farmhouse in Leioa, and buildings of Santurtzi on the background.

Greater Bilbao is divided into 25 municipalities, being Bilbao the capital city. The 25 municipalities, among with some others, make the Metropolitan Area of Bilbao.

#	Municipality	Population 2018	Area in km^{2}
	Abanto Zierbena	9,545	18
	Alonsotegi	2,903	16
	Arrigorriaga	12,230	22.8
	Barakaldo	100,435	25.03
	Basauri	40,762	7.2
	Bilbao	345,821	41.2
	Derio	6,545	7.4
	Zierbena	1,492	9.1
	Etxebarri	11,304	3.3
	Erandio	24,222	18.0
	Galdakao	29,288	31.7
	Getxo	78,276	11.9
	Larrabetzu	2,029	21.5
	Leioa	31,495	8.5
	Lezama	2,429	16.5
	Laudio	18,205	37.45
	Loiu	2,416	15.3
	Muskiz	7,567	21.5
	Ortuella	8,360	7.7
	Portugalete	45,826	3.2
	Santurtzi	45,795	6.7
	Sestao	27,445	3.5
	Sondika	4,495	6.3
	Trapagaran	11,953	13.1
	Zamudio	3,236	18.1
	Zaratamo	1,515	10.0
