= Laukiz =

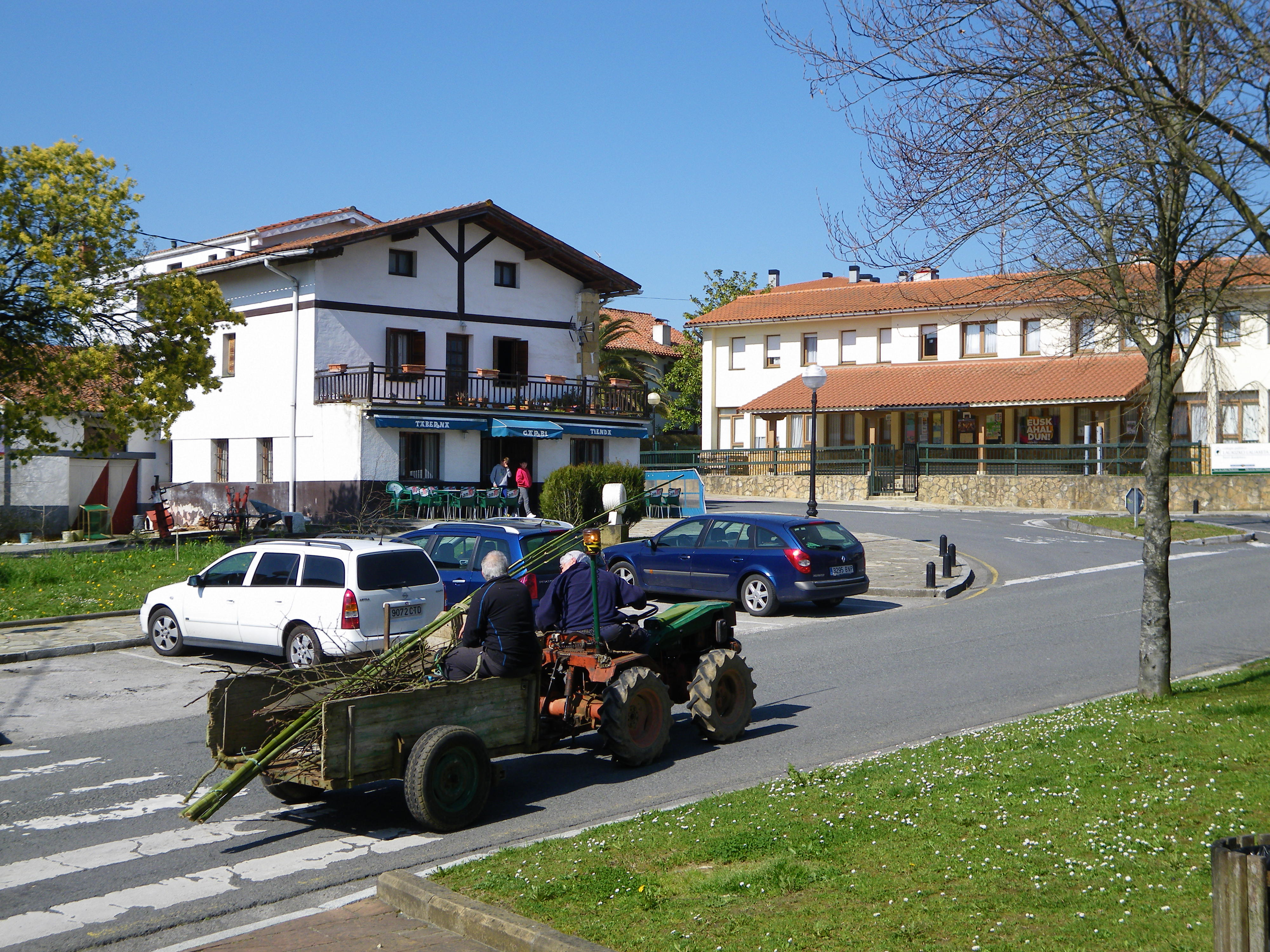
- Eleizalde district, Laukiz, Basque Country, Spain

- Flag Coat of arms

- Location of Laukiz within the Basque Country Location of Laukiz within Spain
- Coordinates: 43°20′58″N 2°54′52″W
- Country: Spain
- Autonomous community: Basque Country
- Province: Biscay
- Comarca: Uribe-Kosta

Government
  - Mayor: Salvador Artaza Arguintxona

Area
  - Total: 8.16 km^{2} (3.15 sq mi)
- Elevation: 53 m (174 ft)

Population (2025-01-01)
  - Total: 1,239
  - Density: 152/km^{2} (393/sq mi)
- Time zone: UTC+1 (CET)
  - Summer (DST): UTC+2 (CEST)
- Postal code: 48111
- Website: www.laukiz.net

Laukiz is a town and municipality located in the province of Biscay, in the autonomous community of Basque Country, northern Spain.
