= Plentzia =

Plentzia Plencia
- Municipality
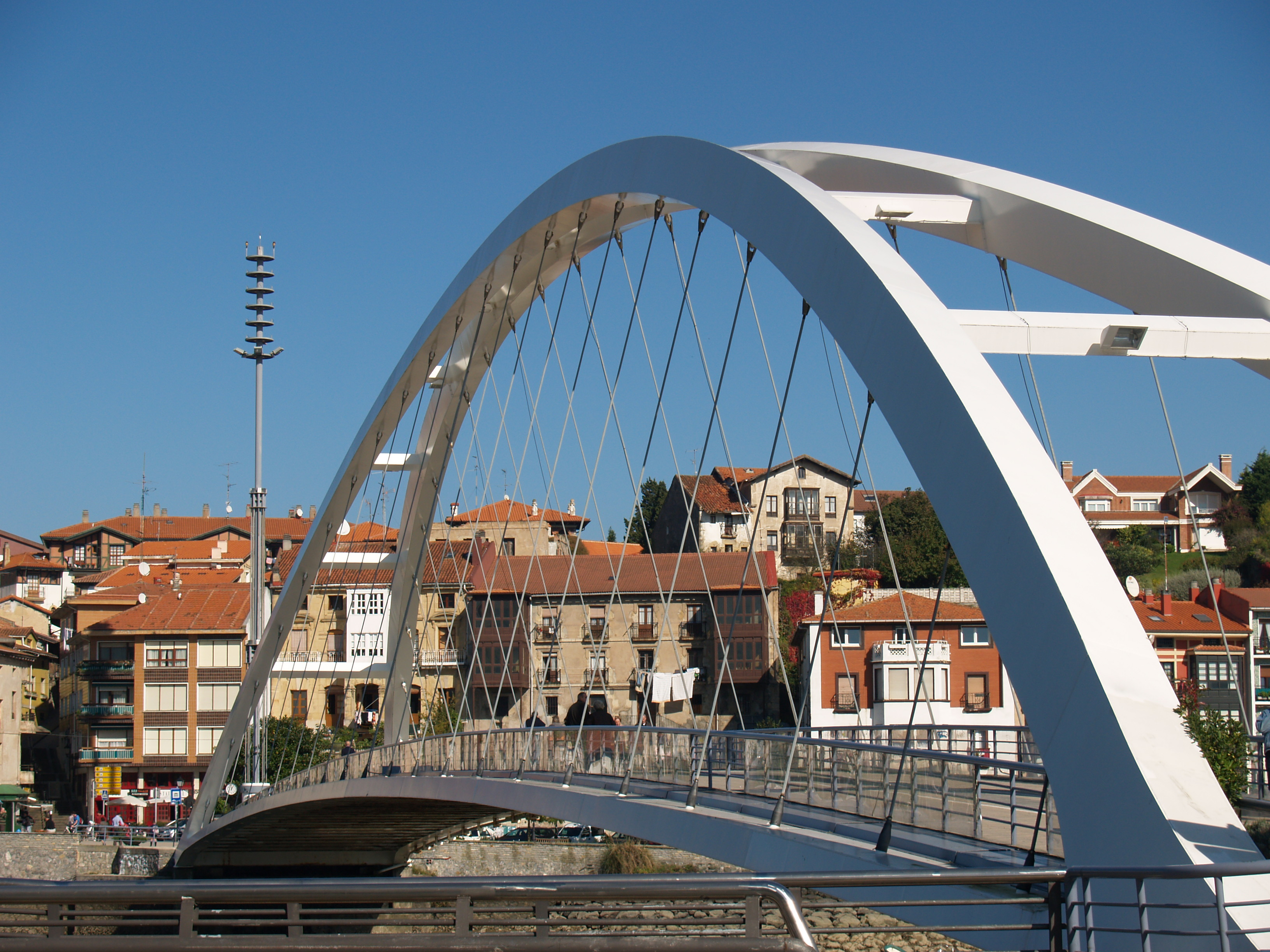

- Flag Coat of arms

- Location of Plentzia within the Basque Country Location of Plentzia within Spain
- Coordinates: 43°24′21″N 2°56′47″W
- Country: Spain
- Autonomous community: Basque Country
- Province: Biscay
- Comarca: Mungialdea

Government
  - Mayor: Aitor Garagarza Cambra (EH Bildu)

Area
  - Total: 11.17 km^{2} (4.31 sq mi)
- Elevation: 19 m (62 ft)

Population (2025-01-01)
  - Total: 4,407
  - Density: 394.5/km^{2} (1,022/sq mi)
- Demonym(s): Spanish: Plenciano; Basque: Plentziar
- Time zone: UTC+1 (CET)
  - Summer (DST): UTC+2 (CEST)
- Postal code: 48620
- Website: Official website

Plentzia (Spanish: Plencia) is a town and municipality located in the province of Biscay, in the autonomous community of the Basque Country. The town has 4,459 inhabitants (2023).

Plentzia is located 25 km north-east of Bilbao. It is part of the Bilbao metropolitan area, as well as being the terminus of the first line of the city's Metro. In addition to the Metro, two BizkaiBus bus routes serve the town, with further destinations served from Urduliz, the next stop on the Metro. Plentzia is approximately 30 min by car from Bilbao and Bilbao airport. Coming from Bilbao, take the BI-634 from Bilbao to Sopelana and then follow the signposts along the BI-2122 to Plentzia. From the airport, take the BI-631 as far as Mungia, and from there the BI-2120 to Plentzia.

Plentzia is a resort town with a large beach beside the Plentzia River estuary, in the round, shell-shaped Bay of Plentzia, shared with neighbouring Gorliz and Barrika. The beach is very popular as it is clean and the sea is calm due to the shelter of the bay and the town has many amenities for visitors.

Plentzia and its neighbouring municipalities are popular locations for better-off families from Bilbao to buy weekend–holiday homes and during the summer months the town's beach and bars and restaurants become much busier thanks to these residents and other visitors from Bilbao.

As in most Basque towns, Plentzia has a number of restaurants and bars ranging from small bars offering pintxos to restaurants with formal dining. There is also a small Council-run museum telling the town's history and in particular dealing with its history as a merchant marine port. The town also has an indoor municipal Jai Alai Fronton where the traditional Basque sport of pelota is played and competitive matches can often be seen.

== History ==
The origins of Plentzia goes back to the beginning of the 13th century, when the Lord of Vizcaya Lope Díaz II of Haro define the maritime term of the district of Gorliz, focused on whale hunting. However, the villa was not founded until the year 1299 by Diego López V of Haro. It stood in the area coastal Gaminiz, belonging to the community of Gorliz, which would separate the whole which would constitute the town of Plentzia.

The original name of the new town was Placencia of Butron or Plasencia of Butron, but with the passage of years the use will short it giving rise to the current "Plencia". The “plencianos” were governed by the jurisdiction of Logroño. Subsequent Lords of Vizcaya and Kings of Castile would confirm the privileges of the town.

== Image gallery ==
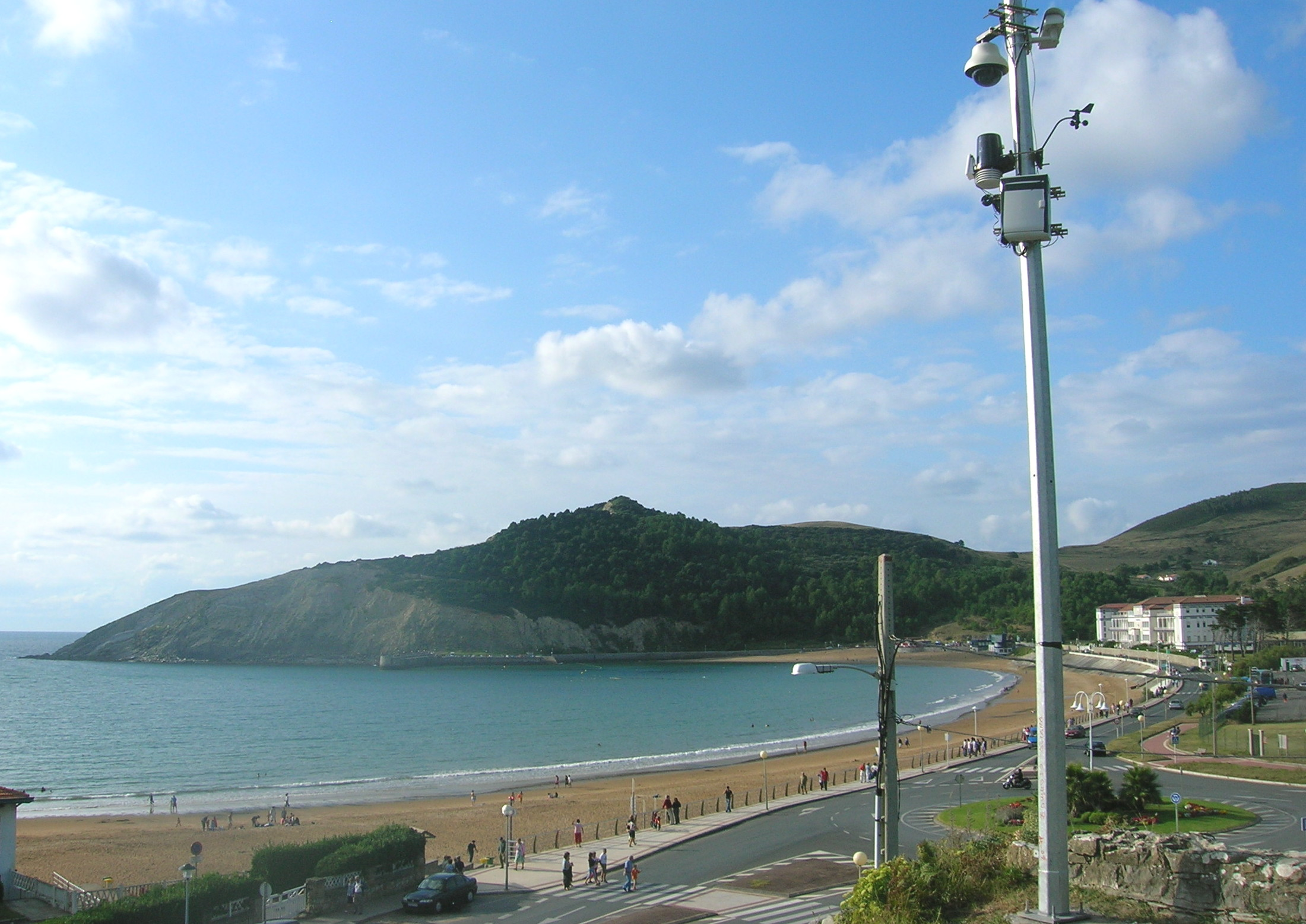
The Bay of Plentzia and the beach

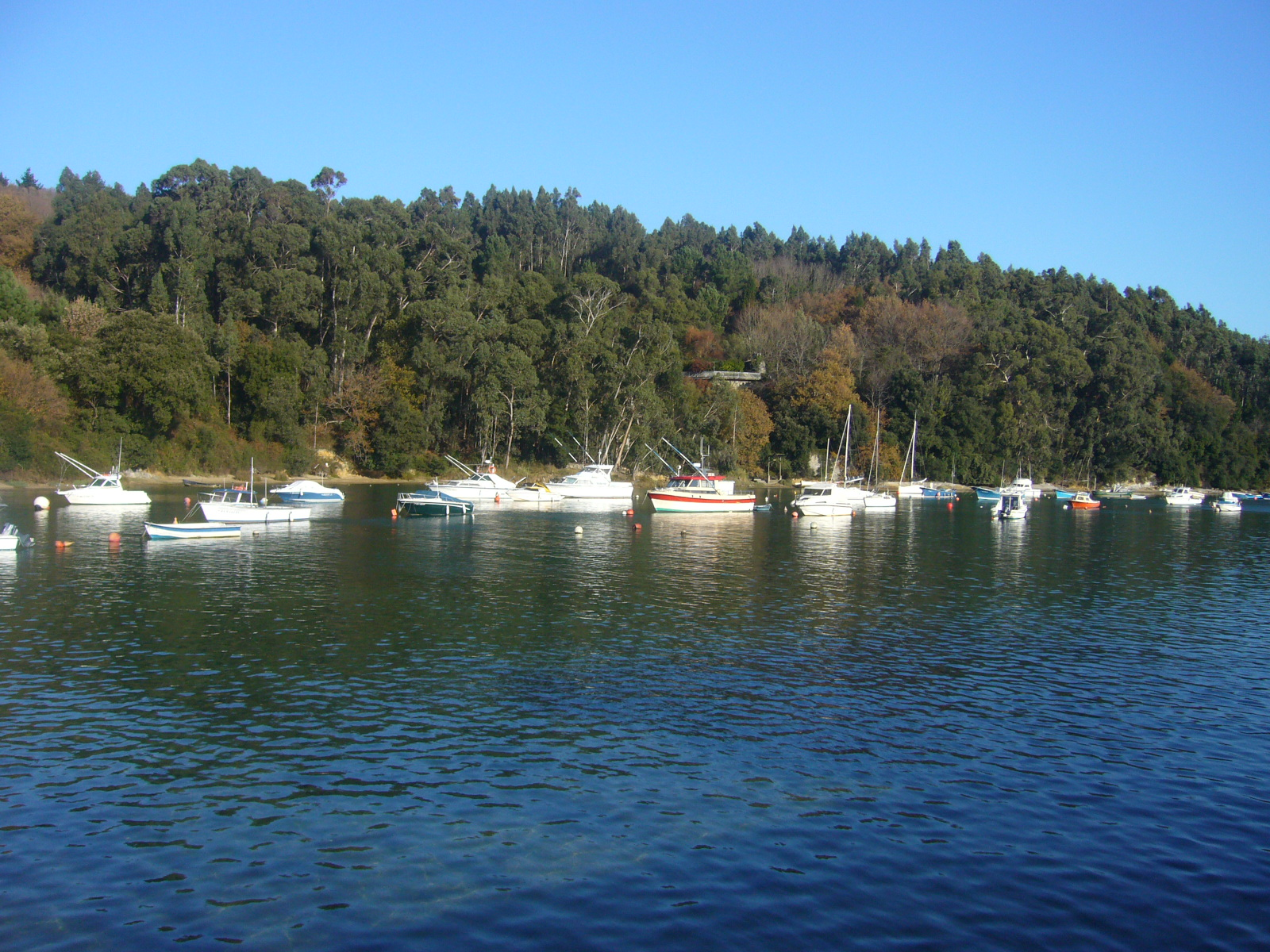
The Plentzia River

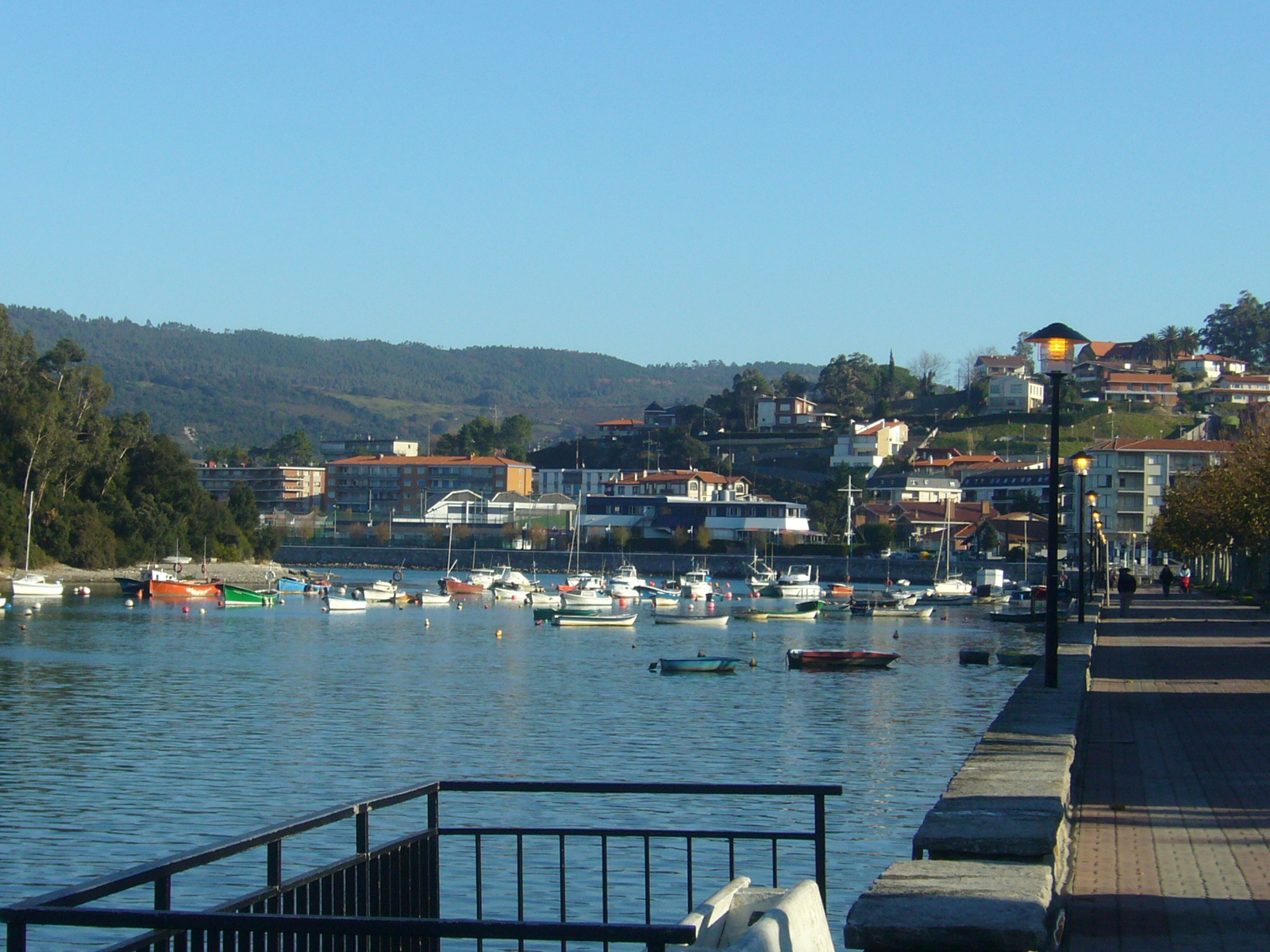
The estuary and the town

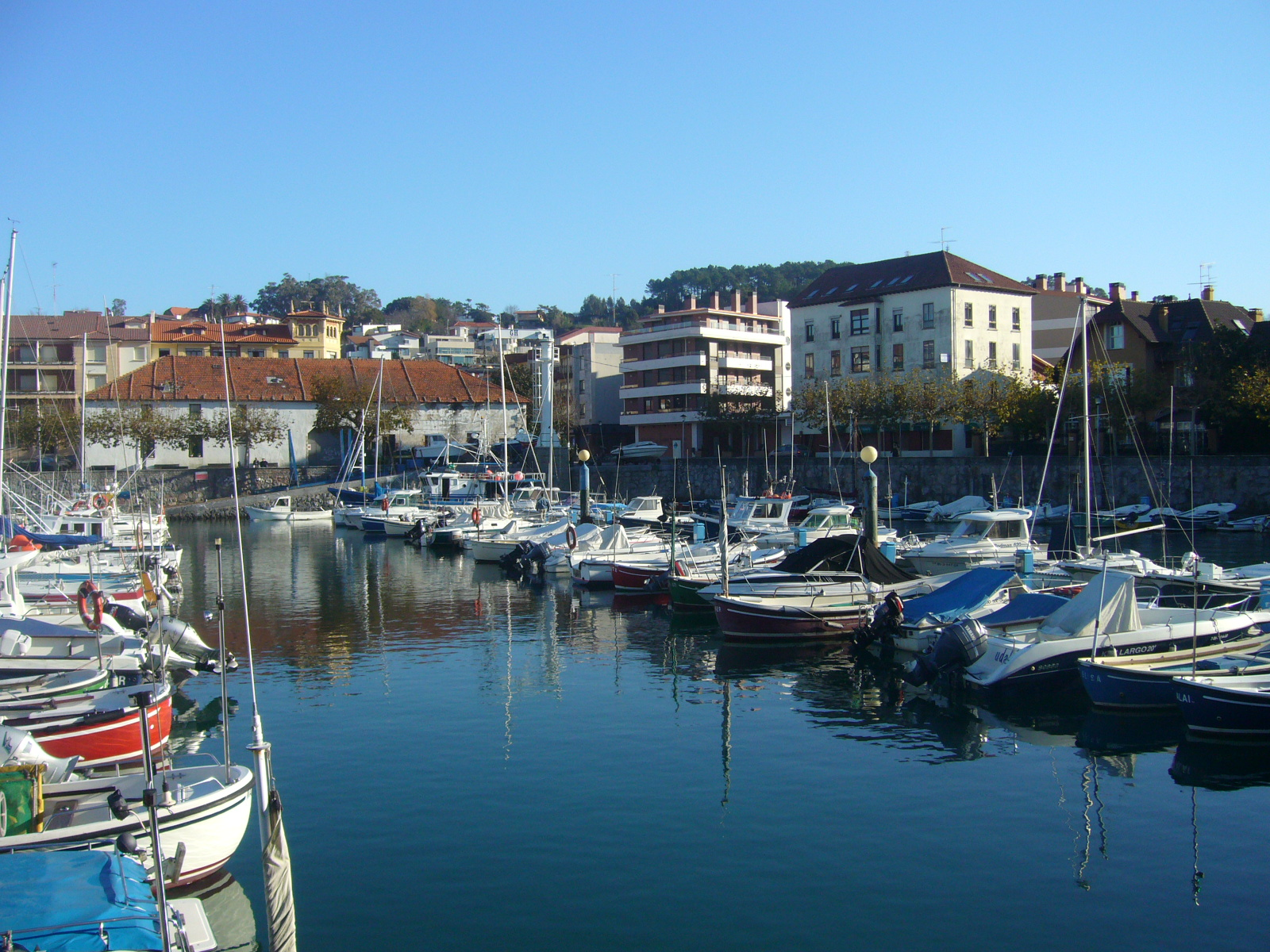
The port
