= Mungia =

- Municipality
- Munguía
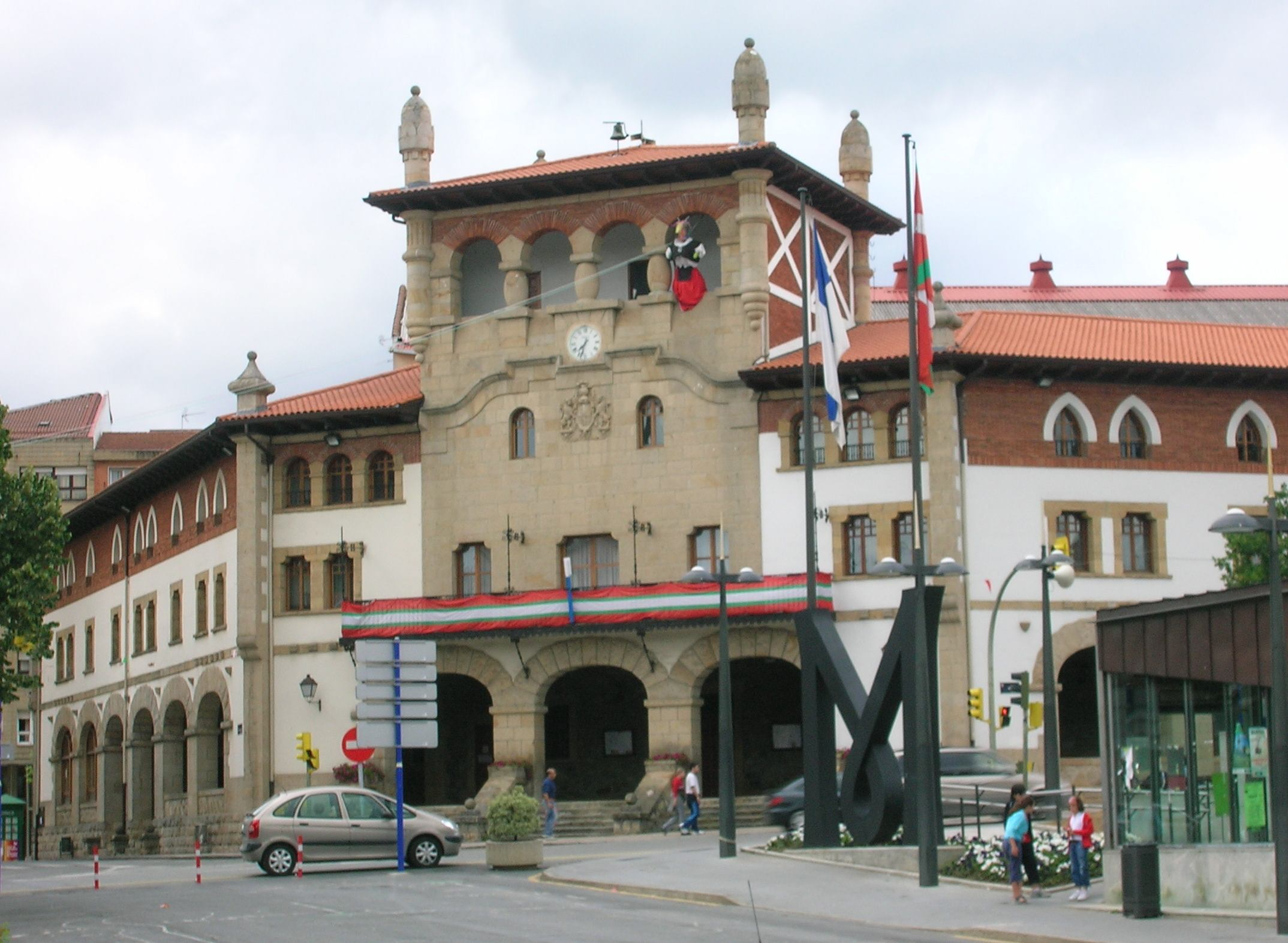
- Mungia Town Office

- Flag Coat of arms

- Location of Mungia within the Basque Country Location of Mungia within Spain
- Coordinates: 43°21′17″N 2°50′50″W
- Country: Spain
- Autonomous community: Basque Country
- Province: Biscay
- Comarca: Mungialdea

Government
  - Alcalde: Ager Izagirre Loroño (PNV)

Area
  - Total: 52.12 km^{2} (20.12 sq mi)
- Elevation: 22 m (72 ft)

Population (2025-01-01)
  - Total: 18,129
  - Density: 347.8/km^{2} (900.9/sq mi)
- Demonym: mungiarra
- Time zone: UTC+1 (CET)
  - Summer (DST): UTC+2 (CEST)
- Postal code: 48100
- Website: Official website

Mungia (in Spanish: Munguía) is a town and municipality located in the province of Biscay, in the Basque Country of northern Spain. The town has 17,691 inhabitants (2019).

== Geography ==
Mungia lies 20 metres above sea level in an area full of open spaces, with a landscape of rolling hills; among these last are Gondramendi (217 m), Tallu (342 m) and Berreaga (366 m). The more important mountains nearby are Sollube (684 m) and Jata (592 m); these surround the valley of the Butroi river, which rises at the mountain of Bizkargi (536 m) and flows to the sea at the Plentzia estuary.

There are many small streams and underground springs, such as the Atxuri, Trobika, Lauromendi, Atebarri, or Mantzorriko Erreka, which are all tributaries of the Butroi river and provide water to the numerous fountains built in the town. In the past those waters helped to run more than 20 mills, some of which are still standing today.

== History ==
Although there are still traces which show that the area where Mungia stands today was inhabited in prehistoric times (there is a castro - a fortified place where an army used to camp - in Berreaga, and some steles of various ages have been found in neighbouring towns) the first documented reference we have dates back to the year 1051, when an abbot from Mungia ( Mome Munchiensis abba ) confirmed a gift from the Lord of Biscay to the Monastery of San Millán de la Cogolla.

At the beginning, Mungia, whose name comes from the Basque Mune - Ganean(which refers to its location at the edge of the Butroi river), was not much more than a tiny village with a very dispersed population. At that time the church was the only focus of the community, but the settlement later began to acquire its own significance as a result of the presence of an abbot and of its location in a strategic pass between the interior of the feudal holding and the coast, primarily at Bermeo, which had begun to stand out as an export harbour. Under these conditions, important families belonging to the nobility settled in the surrounding areas of the village and built there their tower houses. The economic power of these noblemen was based on landholdings.

However, as a consequence of a stockbreeding and agricultural crisis at the end of the 13th century, these families began to suffer. To face this situation they sought very hard to improve their income streams, and usually the easiest recourse they could have was to violence. On the pretext of "being more worthy" they fought with each other, and their peasants were decimated and deprived of their scarce belongings, or even involved in faction fights themselves.

In the area of Mungia, we find representatives of two factions: the Billela family which was part of the Ganboar faction. and the Butroi family which led the faction of Oinaz. As the tower houses of both families were next to each other their fights were a common event.

The borough of Mungia came to be as a consequence of this situation. Some of the inhabitants in the area, witnessing the outrages of the nobility, requested the then Lord of Biscay, the Infante Juan, to grant the title of borough to their town, in order to enable the fortification of the town and thus effective defence against attacks.

By this means on 1 August 1376, under the Fueros of Logroño, the borough of Mungia was created in the centre of an anteiglesia (a village or municipal district specific to the Basque provinces) similar in extent to the Parish) of the same name. Both belonged to the merindad of Uribe (an important and bigger borough which defended and governed all the towns and country houses inside its boundaries), and each had an autonomous municipality. In the same way, they each had their own representation in the Juntas of Gernika (the governmental council representing the people of Biscay), numbering 69 for the anteiglesia and 15 for the borough. But the fact of designating a borough did not avoid a great number of fights in the area. Thus, there were various episodes of different nature, arising from the wars between the factions. Just to name a few of the most important of those small skirmishes, we mention the battle of Berteiz or the battle of Mungia, which took place on 27 April 1479 and in which the factions of Oinaz and Ganboa, enemies up to that moment, formed an alliance to fight against the Earl of Haro.

Leaving these episodes aside, life in Mungia is thought to have been calm. Economic activity was mainly based on farming, with a few mills located on the banks of the many streams which washed the area, as well as small craft workshops settled down in the borough.

The daily round was rarely disturbed. In 1602 there was a fire, and a larger fire 1778 on 9 November with fourteen of the main buildings in the village burned down. From this time, to prevent accidents happening, all flammable products such as straw, wood and coal were stored in a place outside the enceinte. This site was known as Atzekaldeta, a basque name which refers to the location of the place in the rear part of the town.

Thus time passed quietly for both the borough of Mungia and the anteiglesia of the same name. They were independent entities, although they joined for the sake of some services and improvements. Thus, the school was common to both, and when the time arrived to canalise the water from the Gondramendi mountain to the village both shared the expenditure. Little by little, more tasks were performed together and as a result of this co-operation even bigger problems arose leading to the idea of joining both bodies and becoming one unique entity. This happened on 6 October 1900 when a ceremony was held; thereafter, the borough and the anteiglesia merged and became one for the future. The fountain which today lies in Beko Kale, in front of Arnaga, is the symbol of this unity under the motto "Biak bat eta biena" (Both only one and for both).

Up to 1936 life for the inhabitants passed by without major events, based on fundamental rural and agricultural activities, but with an increasing development of crafts and trade. During the Spanish Civil War Mungia was one of the towns most heavily punished in bombardments by fascist troops. Moreover, while withdrawing from Mungia, out of control anarchist groups burned some of the buildings in the town.

The war stopped growth taking place in Mungia. And yet, at the beginning of the 1960s, industrialisation in the area would appeal to many potential workers, resulting in migration not only from neighbouring towns but also from the rest of Spain. A few years later a large number of new buildings and streets were erected, expanding the town centre remarkably.

The recession at the end of the 1970s brought a short period of recession in Mungia, which had repercussions in the whole town; up to then Mungia had experienced a huge growth of population.

For the long years of Francisco Franco's dictatorship, the resistance movement was based on civic associations. Various groups looked for help from institutions such as the Church which worked as an umbrella to support cultural, sporting and educational activities. Those activities sought the preservation and recovery of Basque culture and the establishment of a democratic culture.
