= Urduliz =

- Municipality
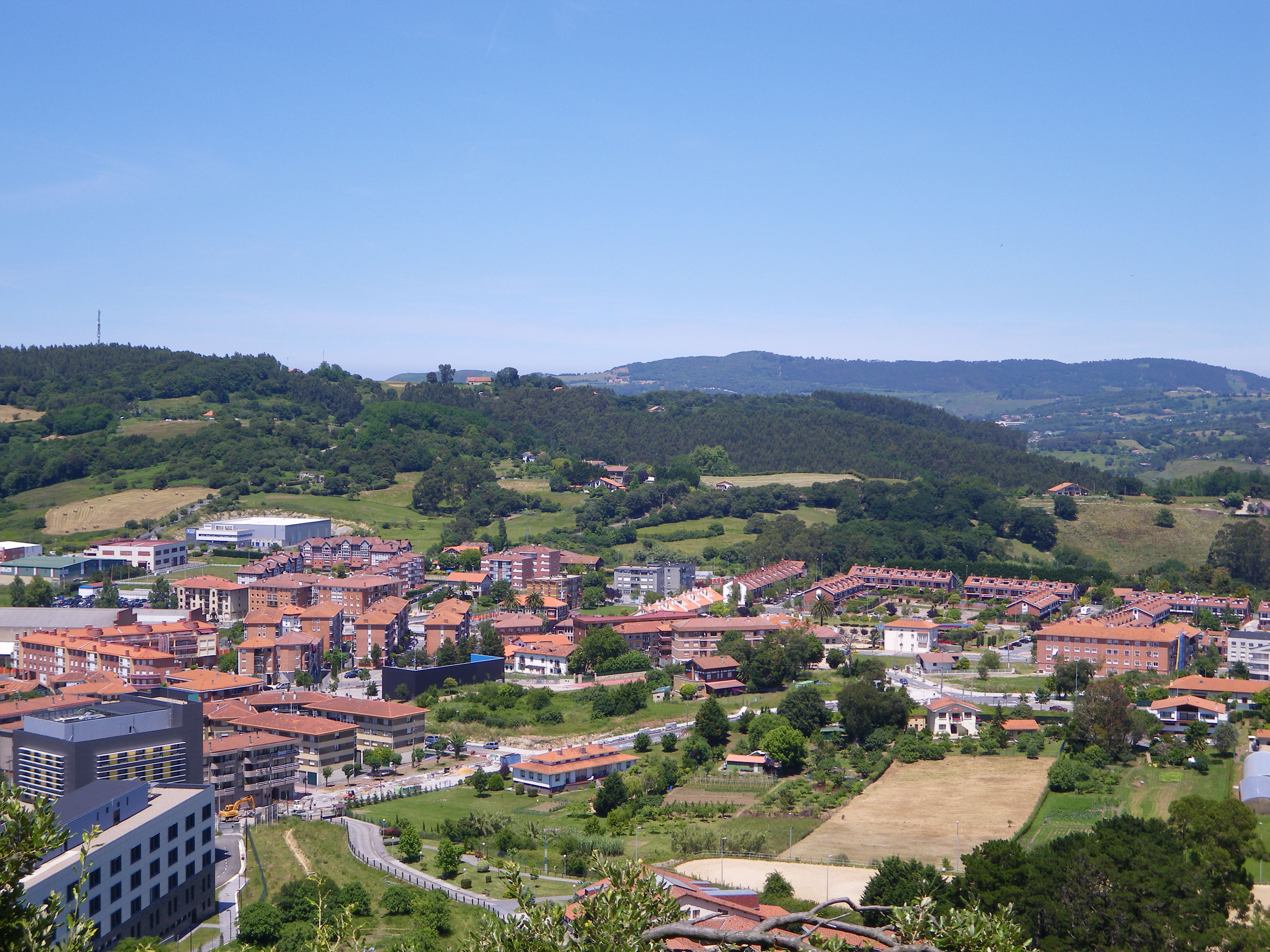
- View of Urduliz

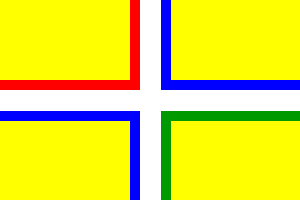
- Flag Coat of arms

- Location of Urduliz within the Basque Country Urduliz (Spain)
- Coordinates: 43°22′22″N 2°56′57″W
- Country: Spain
- Autonomous community: Basque Country
- Province: Biscay
- Comarca: Mungialdea

Government
  - Mayor: Javier Bilbao (EAJ-PNV)

Area
  - Total: 7.8 km^{2} (3.0 sq mi)
- Elevation: 75 m (246 ft)

Population (2025-01-01)
  - Total: 6,128
  - Density: 790/km^{2} (2,000/sq mi)
- Demonym: Basque: urduliztarra
- Time zone: UTC+1 (CET)
  - Summer (DST): UTC+2 (CEST)
- Postal code: 48610
- Official language(s): Basque; Spanish
- Website: Official website

Urduliz (Spanish: Urdúliz) is a municipality located in northern Biscay, Spain. While connected to Greater Bilbao both by the Bilbao Metro and BizkaiBus, the municipality is part of Mungialdea. The municipality shows a mixture of industrial and rural qualities, being divided in three separate villages or neighborhoods. According to the 2024 census, it has 5,626 inhabitants.

== Geography ==
Located in the region of Uribe Kosta, Urduliz sits in the Butron river valley, which has a northwest–southeast orientation. The southeast edge of the valley is bounded by a ridge (Las Peñas de Santa Marina). This ridge contains ruins of a portion of Bilbao's iron ring, cliffs with rock climbing routes, and the hermitage of Saint Marina.
