= Estuary of Bilbao =

At the mouth of the rivers Nervion, Ibaizabal and Cadagua

Coordinates: 43°22′N 3°03′W

The Estuary of Bilbao (Spanish: Ría de Bilbao / Basque: Bilboko Itsasadarra) lies at the common mouth of the rivers Nervion, Ibaizabal and Cadagua, which drain most of Biscay and part of Alava in the Basque Country, Spain. In this instance, the Spanish word estuario is used to describe what in English would normally be called part estuary, part tidal river. The estuary becomes a tidal river which extends 16 km (9.9 mi) into the city of Bilbao, starting from the Bilbao Abra bay. It hosts the port of Bilbao throughout its length, although the Port Authority has recently restored most of the upper reaches to Bilbao and other municipalities for their urban regeneration. The port is now being transferred to the seaboard on the coast at Santurtzi and Zierbena. The estuary and its banks are a part of the Greater Bilbao region.

Downstream from Bilbao the river divides its metropolitan area into its left bank (Barakaldo, Sestao, Portugalete and Santurtzi) and right bank (Erandio, Leioa and Getxo).

Map of the Estuary, to the west the Bay of Biscay and the port docks, to the east the city of Bilbao. To the north is the right bank and to the south the left bank.

== The recovery of the estuary ==
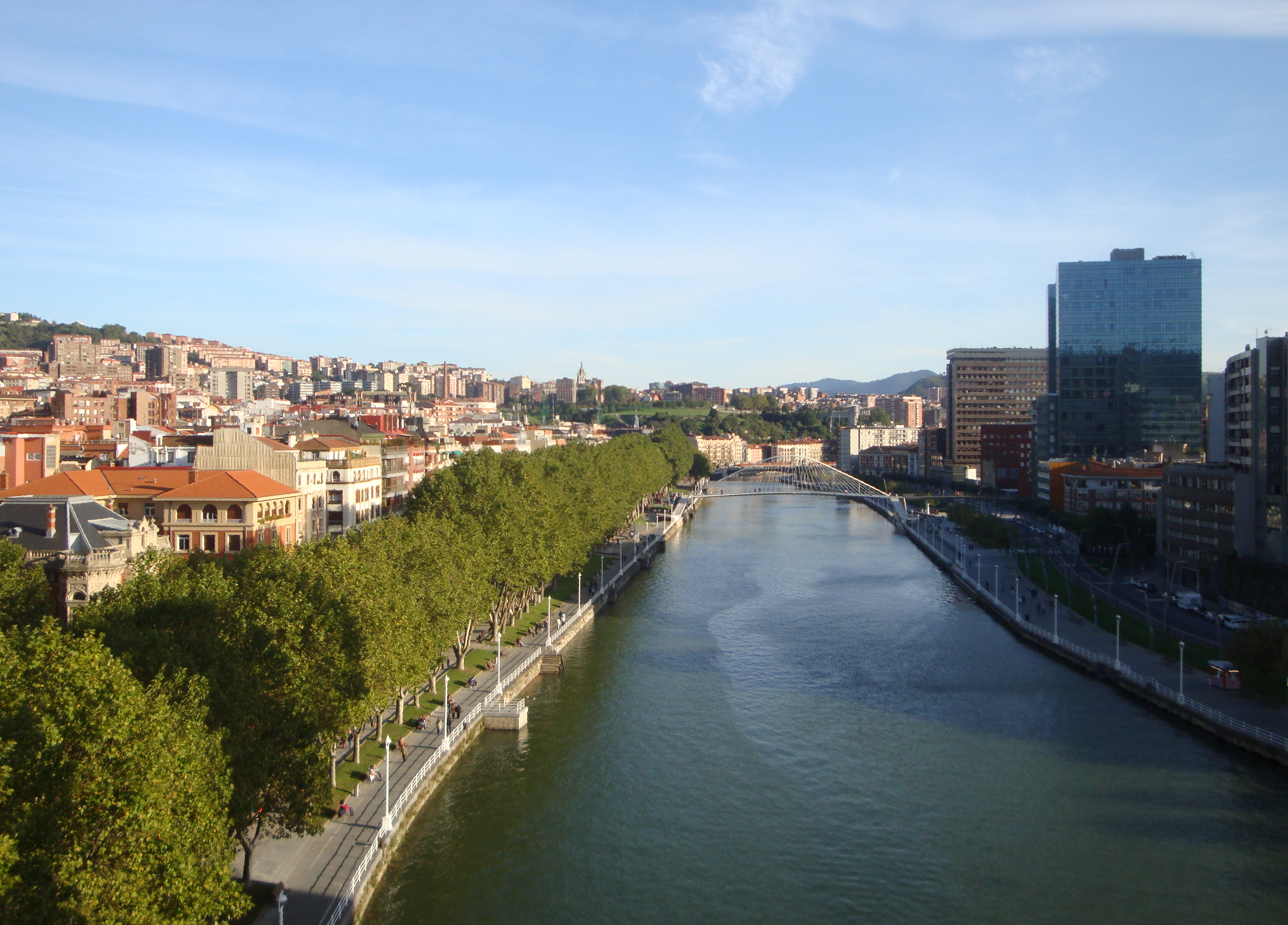
The estuary of Bilbao.

The estuary and tidal river of Bilbao have always been a significant part of the city. Bilbao was born 700 years ago on the banks of the Nervión river as a trading village. It gradually expanded downstream until arriving at the sea. Unfortunately the river reached high levels of contamination because of the industrial activities during the past century. In recent years work has been undertaken to restore the condition of the estuary.

== Left Bank ==
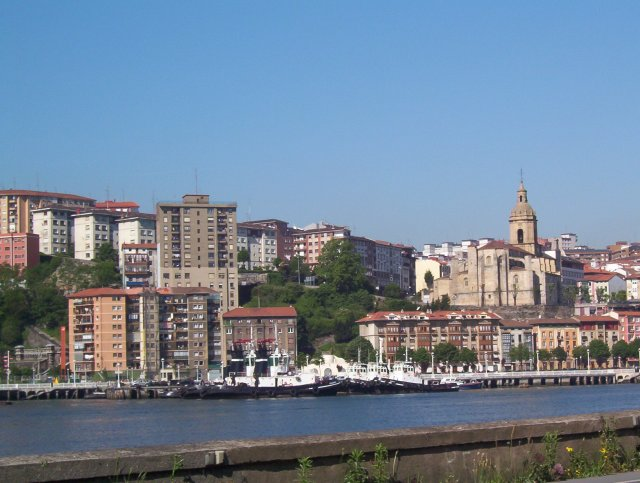
Portugalete, in the left bank.

The main towns on the left bank (Spanish, Margen Izquierda / Basque, Ezkerraldea) are Barakaldo, Sestao, Santurtzi and Portugalete and in addition to the iron mines (Zona Minera or Mehatzaldea), the left bank was the heart of the intense industrialisation of Biscay. Thousands of workers from all Spain came to the area during the 19th and the 20th century to work in the major shipbuilding and steel industries like Altos Hornos de Vizcaya and La Naval. Hence it was one of the birthplaces of the worker movement in Spain. The Socialist leader Indalecio Prieto and the Communist Pasionaria found their initial audiences here.

There was a geographical and political-economical counterposition between the left bank where the workers and industry were located and the Right Bank where the industrialists and more affluent classes had their homes.

== Right Bank ==
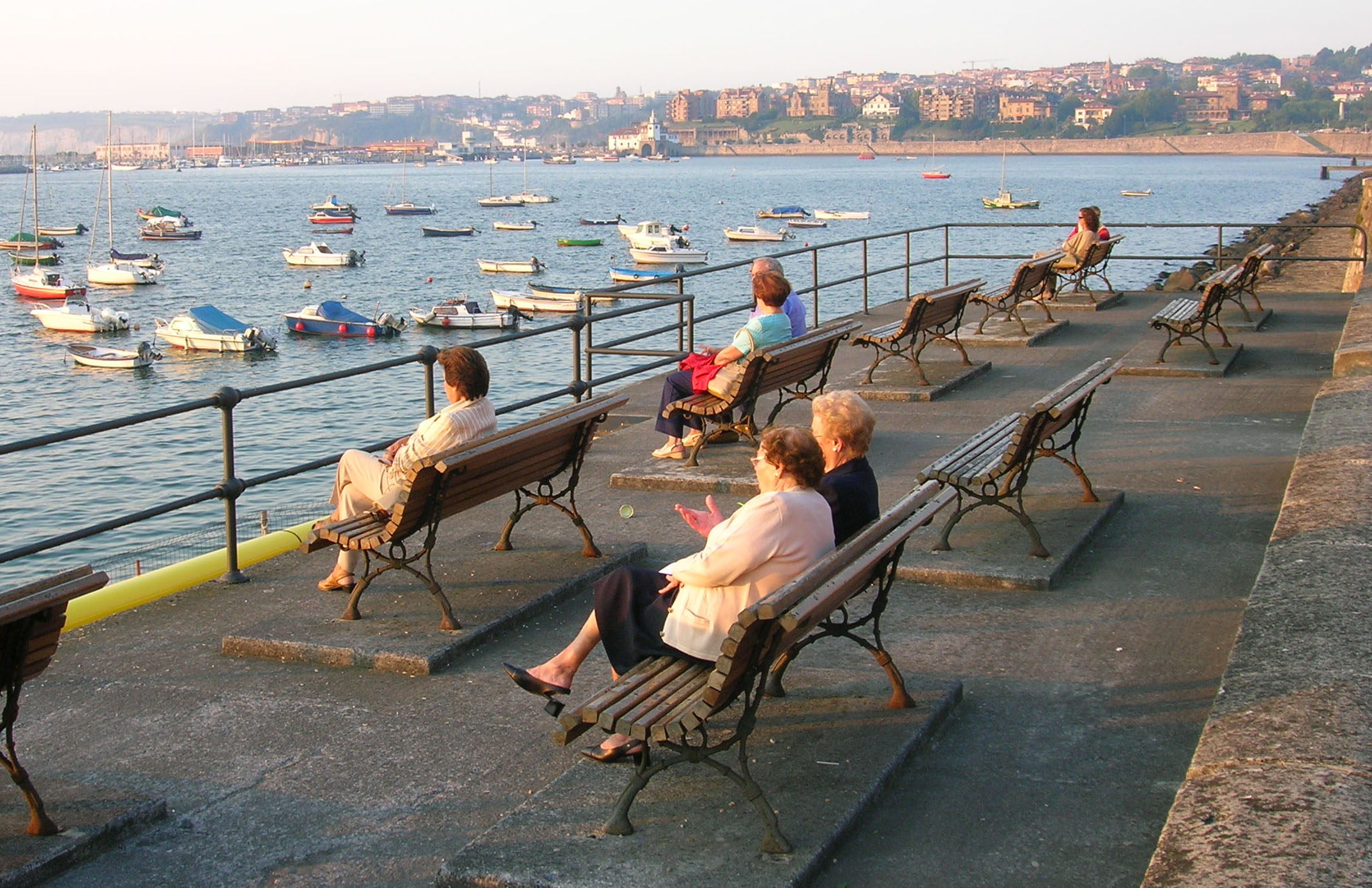
Typical Right Bank houses near Neguri (Getxo).

The right bank of the estuary of the river Nervión in Biscay, Spain is part of the Metropolitan Area of Bilbao and is formed by the towns of Getxo, Leioa and Erandio. It includes affluent neighbourhoods like Neguri and Las Arenas, traditionally the residential areas of the industrial bourgeoisie. The municipality of Getxo is routinely listed amongst the cities with the highest real estate prices and personal income levels in Spain.

The "Puente Colgante" joins it with the Left Bank. The distinction between the two banks has dimmed as the industrial crisis and the lack of building space caused the population of both to merge, and many chalets gave way to apartment blocks. However, both banks are still distinguishable by economic, demographic and political indicators.
