= Hego Uribe =

Modern conventional subdivision of Biscay

Hego Uribe (Basque for Southern Uribe) is a modern conventional subdivision of Biscay, Basque Country. Located within the comarca of Greater Bilbao, directly south of the city of Bilbao itself, the area includes the towns of Basauri, Galdakao, Etxebarri and Arrigorriaga, among others. It is noted for its production of high quality wool.
