= Barrika =

Barrika Barrika Barrica
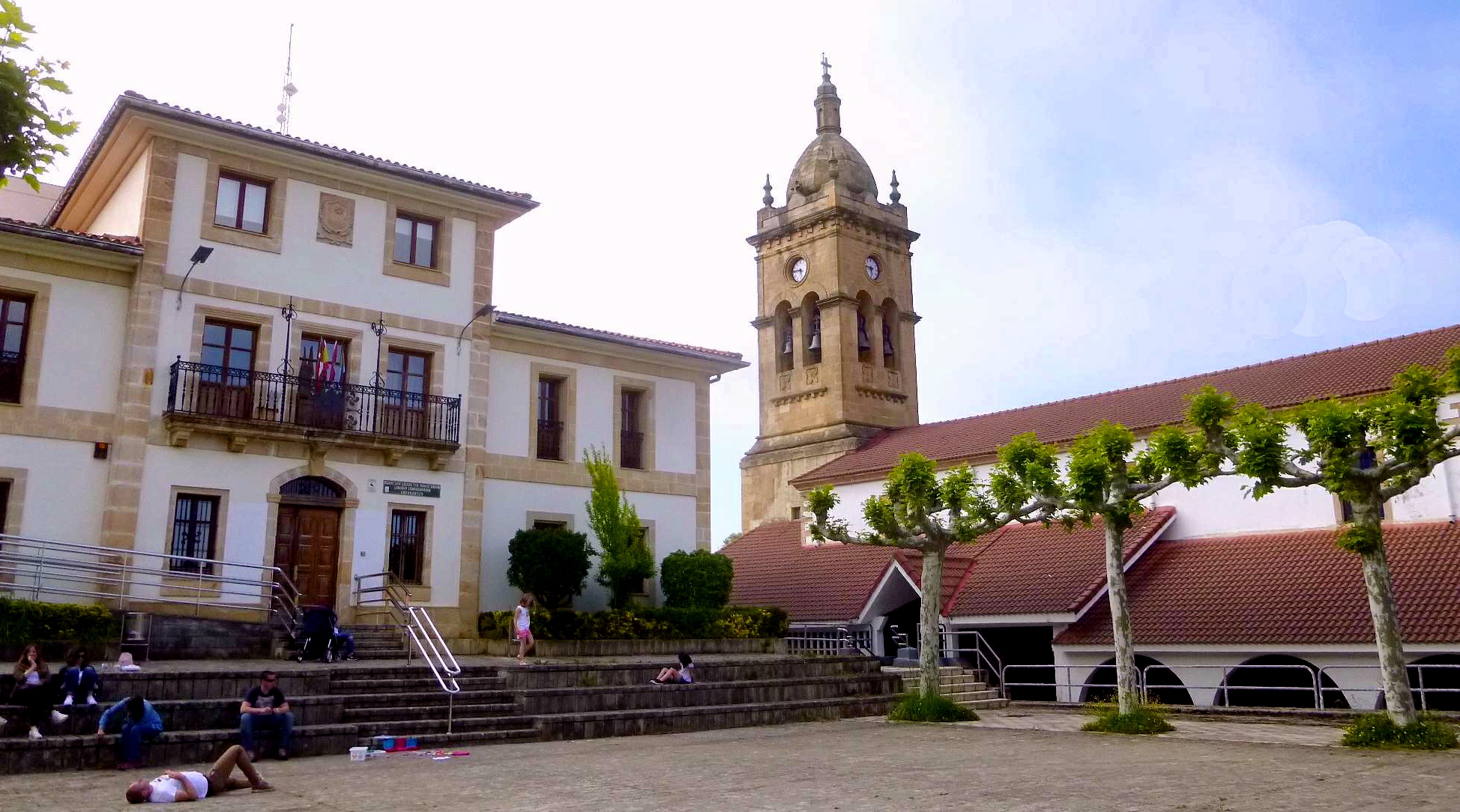
- View of Barrika

- Flag Coat of arms

- Location of Barrika within the Basque Country Location within Spain
- Coordinates: 43°24′N 2°58′W
- Country: Spain
- Autonomous community: Basque Country
- Province: Biscay
- Comarca: Uribe-Kosta

Government
  - Mayor: José Madariaga Martín

Area
  - Total: 7.77 km^{2} (3.00 sq mi)
- Elevation: 75 m (246 ft)

Population (2025-01-01)
  - Total: 1,513
  - Density: 195/km^{2} (504/sq mi)
- Time zone: UTC+1 (CET)
  - Summer (DST): UTC+2 (CEST)
- Postal code: 48650
- Website: www.barrika.eu

Barrika (Spanish: Barrica) (Ibarrika in euskera) is a town and municipality located in the province of Biscay, Spain, in the autonomous community of Basque Country.

It is considered one of the oldest municipalities of Biscay. It was founded by Sancho Vela. As it is placed next to the sea and near Bilbao, its population has grown a lot in the last part of the 20th century.

Barrika belongs to the comarca of Mungialdea. There are about 1,541 inhabitants in the municipality and it covers 7.77 km^{2}.

== History ==
The findings of the archaeological site of Kurtzio testify of human presence in the municipal territory at the period of the prehistoric Asturian culture.

The organization as a parish church can trace its origins to the political structure of the Flat Earth of the Middle Ages. Sancho Vela founded its solar Barrika house in the year 496, this being the origin of the later church.

In addition to the agricultural and livestock activities, its inhabitants worked from old in whaling, as attested by the Carta Puebla granted by Lope Díaz de Haro, Lord of Biscay, in the 13th century.

Barrika had a seat and vote at the General meetings of Guernica, its number was the 51st.

== Notable people ==
- Jon Rahm (born 1994), professional golfer, winner of the U.S. Open in June 2021, The Masters in April 2023 and world number 1 in the Official World Golf Ranking
