= 2018 Tour of the Basque Country =

Cycling race

2018 UCI World Tour, race 14 of 37

Race details
- Dates: 2–7 April 2018
- Stages: 6
- Distance: 819.9 km (509.5 mi)
- Winning time: 20h 53' 47"

Results
Jersey awarded to the overall winner	Winner	Primož Roglič (SLO)	(LottoNL–Jumbo)
	Second	Mikel Landa (ESP)	(Movistar Team)
	Third	Ion Izagirre (ESP)	(Bahrain–Merida)
Jersey awarded to the points classification winner	Points	Primož Roglič (SLO)	(LottoNL–Jumbo)
Jersey awarded to the mountains classification winner	Mountains	Carlos Verona (ESP)	(Mitchelton–Scott)
Jersey awarded to the young rider classification winner	Young rider	Enric Mas (ESP)	(Quick-Step Floors)
	Team	Movistar Team	

The 2018 Tour of the Basque Country was a road cycling stage race that took place between 2 and 7 April 2018 in Spain. It was the 58th edition of the Tour of the Basque Country and the fourteenth event of the 2018 UCI World Tour.

The race was won by a Slovenian rider for the first time, as Primož Roglič (LottoNL–Jumbo) was the most consistent rider over the course of the week. Aside from winning the individual time trial in Lodosa, Roglič finished second on three other stages, cementing the green jersey for the points classification alongside the txapela and yellow jersey for the general classification; Roglič won the race overall by over a minute from his next closest competitor, the Movistar Team's Mikel Landa. Landa, and third-placed Ion Izagirre (Bahrain–Merida), had moved onto the overall podium on the race's penultimate stage, having been a part of a six-rider breakaway in the closing stages. The race's other jerseys were won by Spaniards Carlos Verona (mountains for Mitchelton–Scott), and Enric Mas (young rider for Quick-Step Floors after a final-stage breakaway win), while the Movistar Team won the teams classification as Nairo Quintana also finished in the top-five overall for the team.

== Route ==
The full route of the 2018 Tour of the Basque Country was announced on 2 March 2018. For the first time in over 40 years, the race finished with a road stage and not an individual time trial. On 28 March, it was announced that the second stage – initially due to be held over 152.7 km (95 mi) – was to be extended to 166.7 km (104 mi).

Stage schedule
Stage	Date	Route	Distance	Type	Winner
1	2 April	Zarautz to Zarautz	162.1 km (101 mi)	Medium-mountain stage	Julian Alaphilippe (FRA)
2	3 April	Zarautz to Bermeo	166.7 km (104 mi)	Medium-mountain stage	Julian Alaphilippe (FRA)
3	4 April	Bermeo to Villanueva de Valdegovía	184.8 km (115 mi)	Hilly stage	Jay McCarthy (AUS)
4	5 April	Lodosa to Lodosa	19.4 km (12 mi)	Individual time trial	Primož Roglič (SLO)
5	6 April	Vitoria-Gasteiz to Eibar	164.7 km (102 mi)	Mountain stage	Omar Fraile (ESP)
6	7 April	Eibar to Eibar–Arrate	122.2 km (76 mi)	Mountain stage	Enric Mas (ESP)

== Participating teams ==
As the Tour of the Basque Country was a UCI World Tour event, all eighteen UCI WorldTeams were invited automatically and were obliged to enter a team in the race. Four UCI Professional Continental teams were awarded wildcard places, bringing the number of teams to twenty-two. As each team included seven riders (down from eight in 2017), a total of 154 riders were due to start the first stage. However, Team Sunweb's Martijn Tusveld did not start, therefore reducing the peloton to 153 riders.

UCI WorldTeams

- AG2R La Mondiale
- Astana
- Bahrain–Merida
- BMC Racing Team
- Bora–Hansgrohe
- Team Dimension Data
- EF Education First–Drapac p/b Cannondale
- Team Katusha–Alpecin
- LottoNL–Jumbo
- Lotto–Soudal
- Mitchelton–Scott
- Movistar Team
- Quick-Step Floors
- Team Sky
- Team Sunweb
- Trek–Segafredo
- UAE Team Emirates
- Groupama–FDJ

UCI Professional Continental teams

- Burgos BH
- Caja Rural–Seguros RGA
- Cofidis
- Euskadi–Murias

== Stages ==
=== Stage 1 ===
2 April 2018 — Zarautz to Zarautz, 162.1 km (101 mi)

Result of Stage 1
Rank	Rider	Team	Time
1	Julian Alaphilippe (FRA)	Quick-Step Floors	4h 17' 46"
2	Primož Roglič (SLO)	LottoNL–Jumbo	+ 0"
3	Pello Bilbao (ESP)	Astana	+ 23"
4	Enric Mas (ESP)	Quick-Step Floors	+ 23"
5	Gorka Izagirre (ESP)	Bahrain–Merida	+ 23"
6	Emanuel Buchmann (GER)	Bora–Hansgrohe	+ 23"
7	Patrick Konrad (AUT)	Bora–Hansgrohe	+ 23"
8	Jelle Vanendert (BEL)	Lotto–Soudal	+ 23"
9	Romain Bardet (FRA)	AG2R La Mondiale	+ 23"
10	Nairo Quintana (COL)	Movistar Team	+ 23"

General classification after Stage 1
Rank	Rider	Team	Time
1	Julian Alaphilippe (FRA)	Quick-Step Floors	4h 17' 36"
2	Primož Roglič (SLO)	LottoNL–Jumbo	+ 4"
3	Pello Bilbao (ESP)	Astana	+ 29"
4	Enric Mas (ESP)	Quick-Step Floors	+ 33"
5	Gorka Izagirre (ESP)	Bahrain–Merida	+ 33"
6	Emanuel Buchmann (GER)	Bora–Hansgrohe	+ 33"
7	Patrick Konrad (AUT)	Bora–Hansgrohe	+ 33"
8	Jelle Vanendert (BEL)	Lotto–Soudal	+ 33"
9	Romain Bardet (FRA)	AG2R La Mondiale	+ 33"
10	Nairo Quintana (COL)	Movistar Team	+ 33"

=== Stage 2 ===
3 April 2018 — Zarautz to Bermeo, 166.7 km (104 mi)

Result of Stage 2
Rank	Rider	Team	Time
1	Julian Alaphilippe (FRA)	Quick-Step Floors	4h 11' 47"
2	Primož Roglič (SLO)	LottoNL–Jumbo	+ 0"
3	Gorka Izagirre (ESP)	Bahrain–Merida	+ 0"
4	Mikel Landa (ESP)	Movistar Team	+ 0"
5	Patrick Konrad (AUT)	Bora–Hansgrohe	+ 15"
6	Eduard Prades (ESP)	Euskadi–Murias	+ 15"
7	Pello Bilbao (ESP)	Astana	+ 15"
8	Rudy Molard (FRA)	Groupama–FDJ	+ 15"
9	Enric Mas (ESP)	Quick-Step Floors	+ 15"
10	Ion Izagirre (ESP)	Bahrain–Merida	+ 15"

General classification after Stage 2
Rank	Rider	Team	Time
1	Julian Alaphilippe (FRA)	Quick-Step Floors	8h 29' 13"
2	Primož Roglič (SLO)	LottoNL–Jumbo	+ 8"
3	Gorka Izagirre (ESP)	Bahrain–Merida	+ 39"
4	Mikel Landa (ESP)	Movistar Team	+ 43"
5	Pello Bilbao (ESP)	Astana	+ 54"
6	Patrick Konrad (AUT)	Bora–Hansgrohe	+ 58"
7	Enric Mas (ESP)	Quick-Step Floors	+ 58"
8	Emanuel Buchmann (GER)	Bora–Hansgrohe	+ 58"
9	Rudy Molard (FRA)	Groupama–FDJ	+ 58"
10	Romain Bardet (FRA)	AG2R La Mondiale	+ 58"

=== Stage 3 ===
4 April 2018 — Bermeo to Villanueva de Valdegovía, 184.8 km (115 mi)

Result of Stage 3
Rank	Rider	Team	Time
1	Jay McCarthy (AUS)	Bora–Hansgrohe	4h 49' 39"
2	Alexandr Riabushenko (BLR)	UAE Team Emirates	+ 0"
3	Michał Kwiatkowski (POL)	Team Sky	+ 0"
4	Michael Albasini (SUI)	Mitchelton–Scott	+ 0"
5	Enrique Sanz (ESP)	Euskadi–Murias	+ 0"
6	Julian Alaphilippe (FRA)	Quick-Step Floors	+ 0"
7	Michael Matthews (AUS)	Team Sunweb	+ 0"
8	Jesús Ezquerra (ESP)	Burgos BH	+ 0"
9	Pello Bilbao (ESP)	Astana	+ 0"
10	Enrico Battaglin (ITA)	LottoNL–Jumbo	+ 0"

General classification after Stage 3
Rank	Rider	Team	Time
1	Julian Alaphilippe (FRA)	Quick-Step Floors	13h 18' 52"
2	Primož Roglič (SLO)	LottoNL–Jumbo	+ 8"
3	Gorka Izagirre (ESP)	Bahrain–Merida	+ 39"
4	Mikel Landa (ESP)	Movistar Team	+ 43"
5	Pello Bilbao (ESP)	Astana	+ 54"
6	Rudy Molard (FRA)	Groupama–FDJ	+ 58"
7	Emanuel Buchmann (GER)	Bora–Hansgrohe	+ 58"
8	Romain Bardet (FRA)	AG2R La Mondiale	+ 58"
9	Enric Mas (ESP)	Quick-Step Floors	+ 58"
10	Patrick Konrad (AUT)	Bora–Hansgrohe	+ 58"

=== Stage 4 ===
5 April 2018 — Lodosa to Lodosa, 19.4 km (12 mi), individual time trial (ITT)

Result of Stage 4
Rank	Rider	Team	Time
1	Primož Roglič (SLO)	LottoNL–Jumbo	22' 26"
2	Patrick Bevin (NZL)	BMC Racing Team	+ 9"
3	Vasil Kiryienka (BLR)	Team Sky	+ 11"
4	Jonathan Castroviejo (ESP)	Team Sky	+ 14"
5	Michał Kwiatkowski (POL)	Team Sky	+ 20"
6	Michael Matthews (AUS)	Team Sunweb	+ 36"
7	David de la Cruz (ESP)	Team Sky	+ 37"
8	Julian Alaphilippe (FRA)	Quick-Step Floors	+ 42"
9	Bauke Mollema (NED)	Trek–Segafredo	+ 43"
10	Damiano Caruso (ITA)	BMC Racing Team	+ 43"

General classification after Stage 4
Rank	Rider	Team	Time
1	Primož Roglič (SLO)	LottoNL–Jumbo	13h 41' 26"
2	Julian Alaphilippe (FRA)	Quick-Step Floors	+ 34"
3	Bauke Mollema (NED)	Trek–Segafredo	+ 1' 33"
4	Patrick Konrad (AUT)	Bora–Hansgrohe	+ 1' 36"
5	Gorka Izagirre (ESP)	Bahrain–Merida	+ 1' 42"
6	Emanuel Buchmann (GER)	Bora–Hansgrohe	+ 1' 48"
7	Mikel Landa (ESP)	Movistar Team	+ 1' 51"
8	Pello Bilbao (ESP)	Astana	+ 1' 57"
9	Nairo Quintana (COL)	Movistar Team	+ 2' 08"
10	Ion Izagirre (ESP)	Bahrain–Merida	+ 2' 11"

=== Stage 5 ===
6 April 2018 — Vitoria-Gasteiz to Eibar, 164.7 km (102 mi)

Result of Stage 5
Rank	Rider	Team	Time
1	Omar Fraile (ESP)	Astana	3h 53' 59"
2	Primož Roglič (SLO)	LottoNL–Jumbo	+ 0"
3	Ion Izagirre (ESP)	Bahrain–Merida	+ 0"
4	Carlos Verona (ESP)	Mitchelton–Scott	+ 0"
5	José Herrada (ESP)	Cofidis	+ 0"
6	Mikel Landa (ESP)	Movistar Team	+ 0"
7	Mark Padun (UKR)	Bahrain–Merida	+ 15"
8	Pello Bilbao (ESP)	Astana	+ 1' 27"
9	Rui Costa (POR)	UAE Team Emirates	+ 1' 27"
10	Jai Hindley (AUS)	Team Sunweb	+ 1' 27"

General classification after Stage 5
Rank	Rider	Team	Time
1	Primož Roglič (SLO)	LottoNL–Jumbo	17h 35' 19"
2	Mikel Landa (ESP)	Movistar Team	+ 1' 57"
3	Ion Izagirre (ESP)	Bahrain–Merida	+ 2' 13"
4	Julian Alaphilippe (FRA)	Quick-Step Floors	+ 2' 55"
5	Bauke Mollema (NED)	Trek–Segafredo	+ 3' 06"
6	Emanuel Buchmann (GER)	Bora–Hansgrohe	+ 3' 21"
7	Pello Bilbao (ESP)	Astana	+ 3' 30"
8	Nairo Quintana (COL)	Movistar Team	+ 3' 41"
9	David de la Cruz (ESP)	Team Sky	+ 3' 49"
10	Rigoberto Urán (COL)	EF Education First–Drapac p/b Cannondale	+ 3' 57"

=== Stage 6 ===
7 April 2018 — Eibar to Eibar–Arrate, 122.2 km (76 mi)

Result of Stage 6
Rank	Rider	Team	Time
1	Enric Mas (ESP)	Quick-Step Floors	3h 17' 34"
2	Mikel Landa (ESP)	Movistar Team	+ 12"
3	Ion Izagirre (ESP)	Bahrain–Merida	+ 27"
4	Dylan Teuns (BEL)	BMC Racing Team	+ 27"
5	Nairo Quintana (COL)	Movistar Team	+ 30"
6	Thomas De Gendt (BEL)	Lotto–Soudal	+ 45"
7	Emanuel Buchmann (GER)	Bora–Hansgrohe	+ 47"
8	Gregor Mühlberger (AUT)	Bora–Hansgrohe	+ 54"
9	Primož Roglič (SLO)	LottoNL–Jumbo	+ 54"
10	Patrick Konrad (AUT)	Bora–Hansgrohe	+ 54"

Final general classification
Rank	Rider	Team	Time
1	Primož Roglič (SLO)	LottoNL–Jumbo	20h 53' 47"
2	Mikel Landa (ESP)	Movistar Team	+ 1' 09"
3	Ion Izagirre (ESP)	Bahrain–Merida	+ 1' 42"
4	Emanuel Buchmann (GER)	Bora–Hansgrohe	+ 3' 14"
5	Nairo Quintana (COL)	Movistar Team	+ 3' 17"
6	Enric Mas (ESP)	Quick-Step Floors	+ 3' 29"
7	Bauke Mollema (NED)	Trek–Segafredo	+ 3' 50"
8	Pello Bilbao (ESP)	Astana	+ 4' 14"
9	David de la Cruz (ESP)	Team Sky	+ 4' 15"
10	Patrick Konrad (AUT)	Bora–Hansgrohe	+ 5' 30"

== Classification leadership table ==
In the 2018 Tour of the Basque Country, four different jerseys were awarded. The general classification was calculated by adding each cyclist's finishing times on each stage. Introduced for the 2018 edition, time bonuses were awarded to the first three finishers on all stages except for the time trials: the stage winner won a ten-second bonus, with six and four seconds for the second and third riders respectively. Bonus seconds were also awarded to the first three riders at intermediate sprints; three seconds for the winner of the sprint, two seconds for the rider in second and one second for the rider in third. The leader of the general classification received a yellow jersey. This classification was considered the most important of the 2018 Tour of the Basque Country, and the winner of the classification was considered the winner of the race.

Additionally, there was a points classification, which awarded a green jersey, a change from white in 2017. In the points classification, cyclists received points for finishing in the top 15 in a stage. For winning a stage, a rider earned 25 points, with 20 for second, 16 for third, 14 for fourth, 12 for fifth, 10 for sixth with a point fewer per place down to a single point for 15th place. Points were also won in intermediate sprints; three points for crossing the sprint line first, two points for second place, and one for third.

Points for the mountains classification
Position	1	2	3	4	5	6
Points for Category 1	10	8	6	4	2	1
Points for Category 2	6	4	2	1	0	
Points for Category 3	3	2	1	0		

There was also a mountains classification, for which points were awarded for reaching the top of a climb before other riders. Each of the twenty-three climbs were categorised as either first, second, or third-category, with more points available for the more difficult, higher-categorised climbs. For first-category climbs, the top six riders earned points; on second-category climbs, four riders won points; on third-category climbs, only the top three riders earned points. The leadership of the mountains classification was marked by a red jersey with white polka-dots.

Instead of the sprints classification, as it was in 2017, the fourth jersey represented the young rider classification, marked by a light blue jersey. Only riders born after 1 January 1993 were eligible; the young rider best placed in the general classification was the leader of the young rider classification. There was also a classification for teams, in which the times of the best three cyclists in a team on each stage were added together; the leading team at the end of the race was the team with the lowest cumulative time.

Stage	Winner	General classification	Points classification	Mountains classification	Young rider classification	Teams classification
1	Julian Alaphilippe	Julian Alaphilippe	Julian Alaphilippe	Jonathan Lastra	Enric Mas	Quick-Step Floors
2	Julian Alaphilippe	Julian Alaphilippe	Julian Alaphilippe	Mark Padun	Enric Mas	Quick-Step Floors
3	Jay McCarthy	Julian Alaphilippe	Julian Alaphilippe	Thomas De Gendt	Enric Mas	Quick-Step Floors
4	Primož Roglič	Primož Roglič	Julian Alaphilippe	Thomas De Gendt	Enric Mas	Quick-Step Floors
5	Omar Fraile	Primož Roglič	Primož Roglič	Mark Padun	Jack Haig	Bahrain–Merida
6	Enric Mas	Primož Roglič	Primož Roglič	Carlos Verona	Enric Mas	Movistar Team
Final		Primož Roglič	Primož Roglič	Carlos Verona	Enric Mas	Movistar Team
