= Izaro (given name) =

Female given name

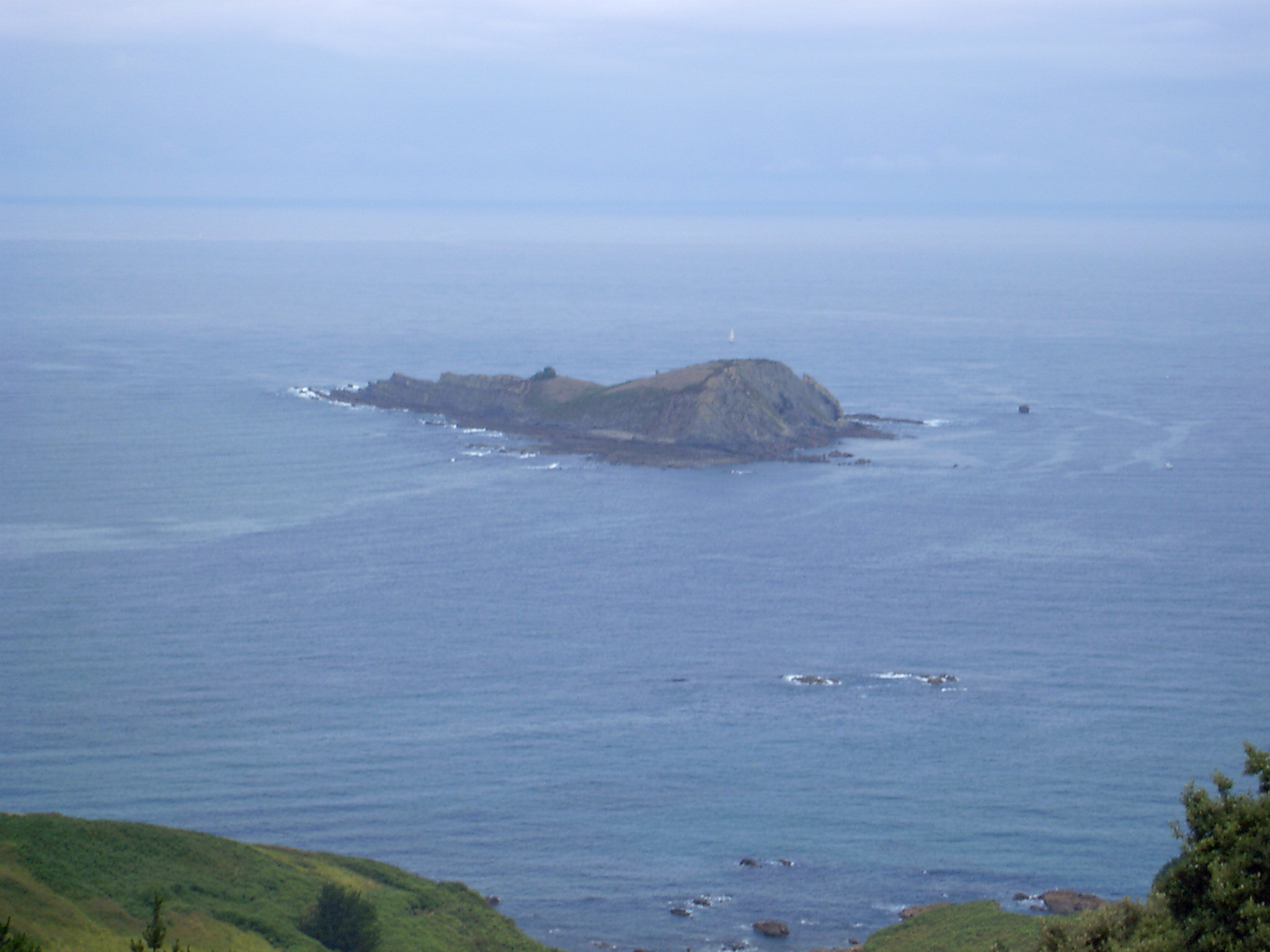
Izaro island seen from Ibarrangelu

Izaro is a Basque feminine given name which is a name of an island located in Mundaka. It was among the 10 most popular names given to newborn girls in Basque Country, Spain in 2011.
