= Mundaka =

Mundaka Mundaca
- Municipality
- Mundaka
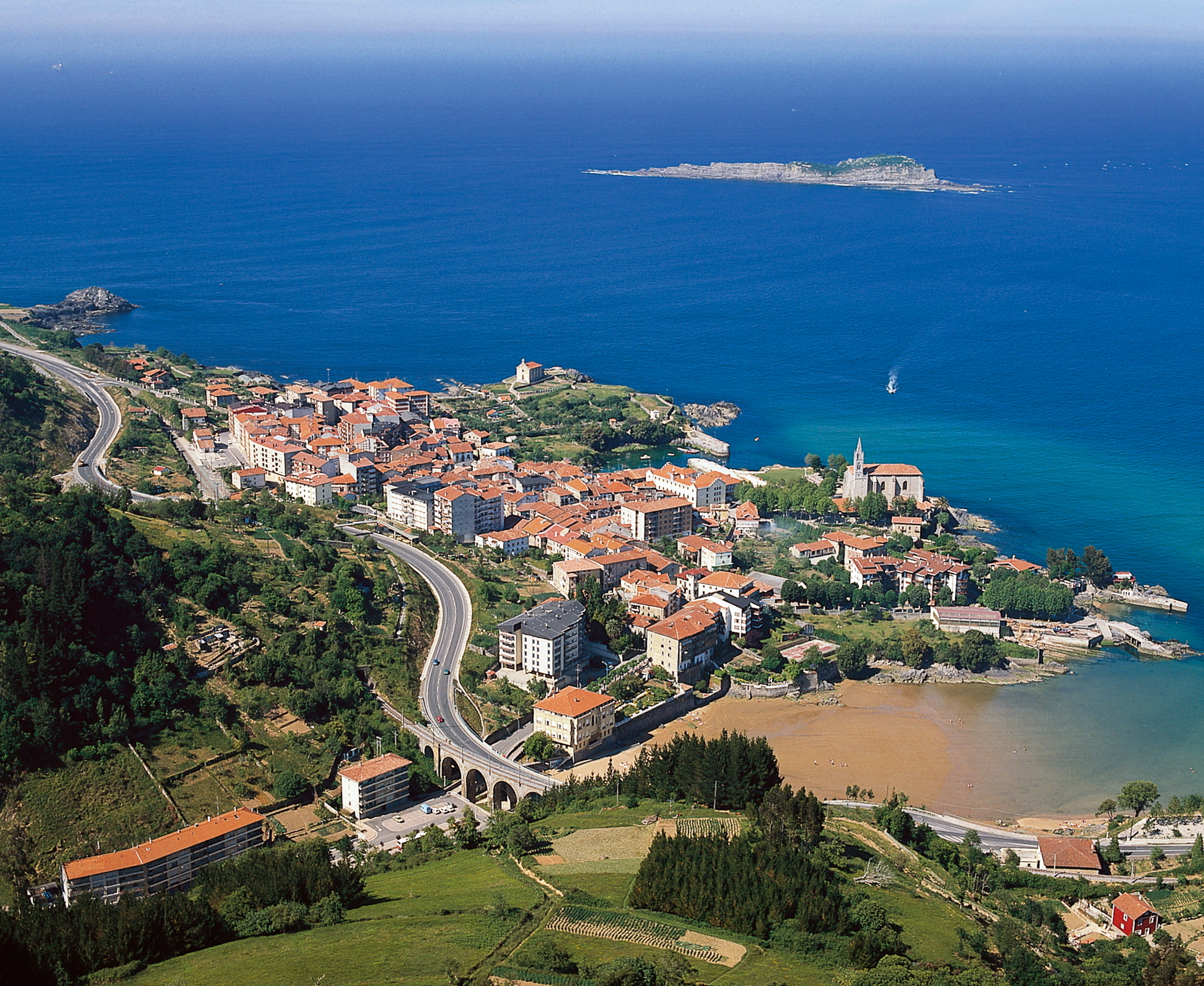
- Mundaka and Ízaro Island

- Flag Coat of arms

- Location of Mundaka within the Basque Autonomous Community Location of Mundaka within Spain
- Coordinates: 43°24′26″N 2°41′54″W
- Country: Spain
- Autonomous community: Euskadi
- Province: Bizkaia
- Comarca: Busturialdea

Government
  - Mayor: Aitor Egurrola Mendiola (EAJ-PNV)

Area
  - Total: 4.15 km^{2} (1.60 sq mi)
- Elevation: 3 m (9.8 ft)

Population (2025-01-01)
  - Total: 1,816
  - Density: 438/km^{2} (1,130/sq mi)
- Demonym: Spanish: mundaqués
- Time zone: UTC+1 (CET)
  - Summer (DST): UTC+2 (CEST)
- Postal code: 48360
- Official language(s): Basque; Spanish
- Website: Official website

Mundaka (Spanish: Mundaca) is a town and municipality located in the province of Biscay, in the autonomous community of Basque Country, in northern Spain. Mundaka is internationally renowned for the surfing community that takes advantage of its coast and unique oceanic conditions.

Mundaka is accessible from Bilbao by EuskoTren on the E4 Urdaibai line.

== History ==
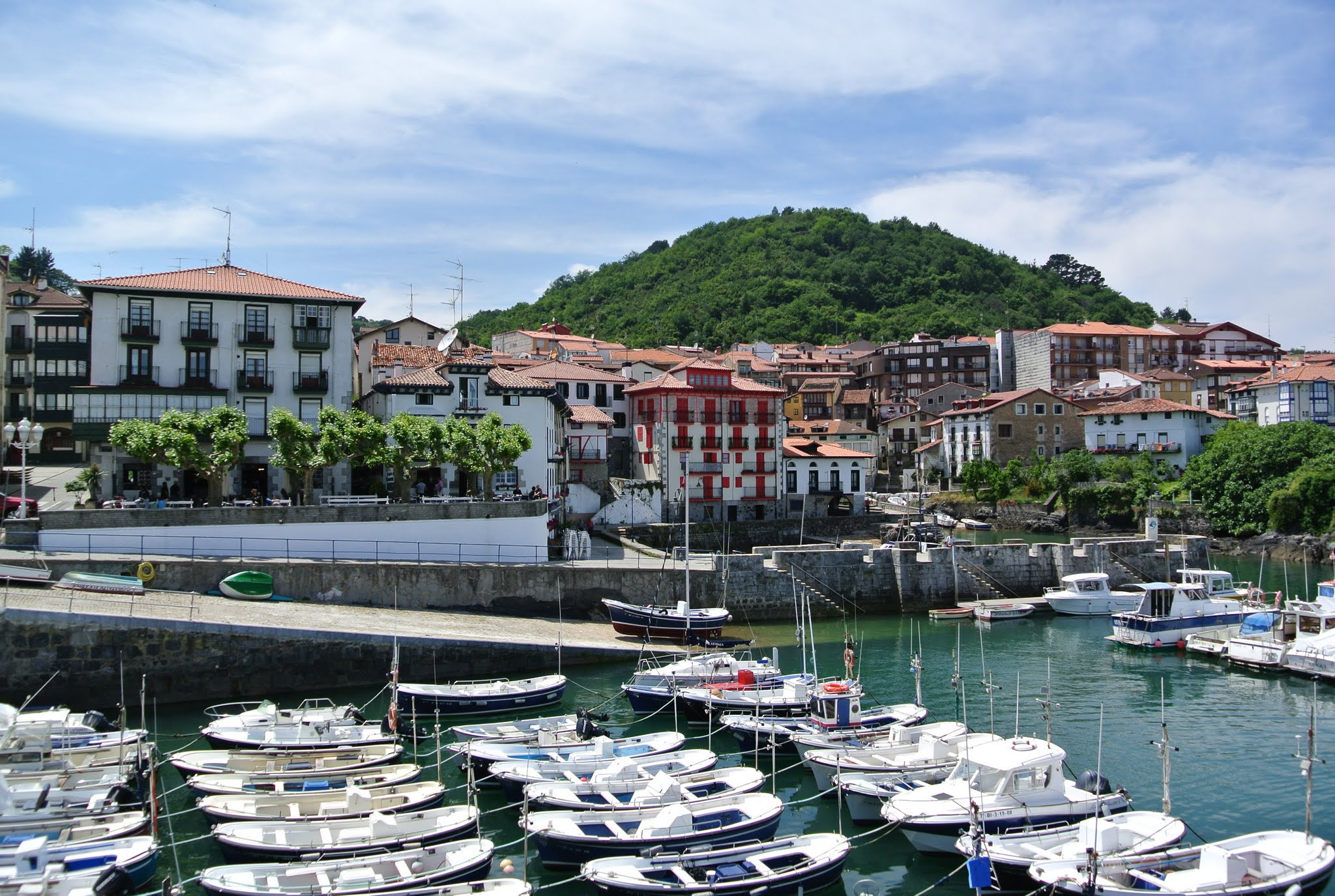
Port of Mundaka

Mundaka is known as one of the most historically important places of the Lordship of Biscay, it is the believed birthplace of Jaun Zuria, the first Lord of Biscay, son of the Scottish princess who arrived in Mundaka escaping from an English King. The name of the town has Danish origin, and it is speculated that the town had Viking influence during the late first millennium, AD. According to the history of the Lordship, Mundaka has the oldest temple in Biscay. As a result, it has the first seat of the General Parliament.

The port is the centerpoint of the town, where the town initially expanded from. Most of the houses in Mundaka are medieval, designed as fishermans' houses that face towards the sea.

The anteiglesia of Mundaka was first mentioned in the year 1051 in the donation of the Dominion of Biscay to the Monastery of San Millán de la Cogolla, and in 1070 in the donation of the aforementioned church to the Monastery of San Juan de la Peña.

The town was evacuated in 1811 during the Peninsular War by French troops, who had occupied the town, when Captain George Collier of the British Royal Navy sailed the H.M.S. Surveillante out of Bermeo through the Mundaca River. Lieutenant Aguiar y Mella tried to escape damaged coasts from shipwrecks while sailing along the Bay of Biscay, but was too, overwhelmed by French on the coast and sailed past the city to avoid confrontation with opposing troops.

== Coat of arms and flag ==
- Shield: The coat of arms of Mundaka is formed by an oak tree surrounded by gold with a wolf. The icon is surrounded by a red and grey checkerboard pattern.
- Flag: The flag of Mundaka is composed of red silk with gold threaded embroidery.

== Etymology ==
There is a well-known legend that attributes the name "Mundaka" to the Latin phrase "munda aqua" ('clean water'). This legend appears in the Chronicle of Biscay written by Lope García de Salazar^{[es]} in the 15th century. According to this story, a ship from Scotland carrying a princess who had been banished from her homeland arrived on the coast of Mundaka. The Scots called the place "in their Latin language, "Munda aqua", since there they had found a source of very clean water that contrasted with the murky waters of the estuary of Urdaibai. This princess would supposedly have a son, Jaun Zuria, and according to legend, Zuria would become the first Lord of Biscay. This legend may also explain why Mundaca is ranked as the first among the elizates of Biscay.

Apart from legends, the etymology of Mundaka is uncertain. The first written mention of Mundaka dates from 1070, when it was referred to as "Mondaka" in the writing of Ego Mome Nunnuç placuit in animis meis mitto in Sancti Johannis de Orioli de Aragone uno monasterio in Bickaga (Vizcaga) in locum quae dicitur Mondaka (Mondacha).

Some have sought a Norse origin for the name, based on the possible presence of a medieval Viking settlement in the area. In Danish, "mund" means "mouth", and "haka" means "promontory, cape". Mundaka lies precisely at the mouth of the estuary of the Oka river, which flows between Santa Catalina and Laida.

Others have related the town name to a stock of Basque phonemes with the endings "-aka", "-eka", "-ika", which are especially abundant in Biscay and which can be linked with the Celto-Italic suffix "-aka". To some, the origin of the name could be much older and it may be traceable back to an era in which Vizcaya could have been populated by a Celtic people.

Traditionally, the name was written as the Spanish "Mundaca", but in modern times, it is more commonly written as "Mundaka", which is an adaptation to the modern rules of spelling of the Basque language. "Mundaca" is usually regarded as the formal name in Castilian and "Mundaka" in Basque. Since 1982, the official name of the municipality has been "Mundaka". The new spelling variation was published in Boletín Oficial del Estado (BOE) in 1989.

The demonym for someone from Mundaka is "mundaqués(a)" in Spanish and "mundakarra" in Basque.

Another possible theory for the origin for the name "Mundaca", is similar to "Munitibar" and "Munditibar", which contains the stem "Munio or Mundio", as in "Muniozguren" and "Munitiz", which refers to a hill or hillock. "-aka" is a suffix referring to a slope, as are "-ika" and "-eka" as well. Considering Mundaca's physical geography, the etymology is possible, i.e., on the slope of a hill.

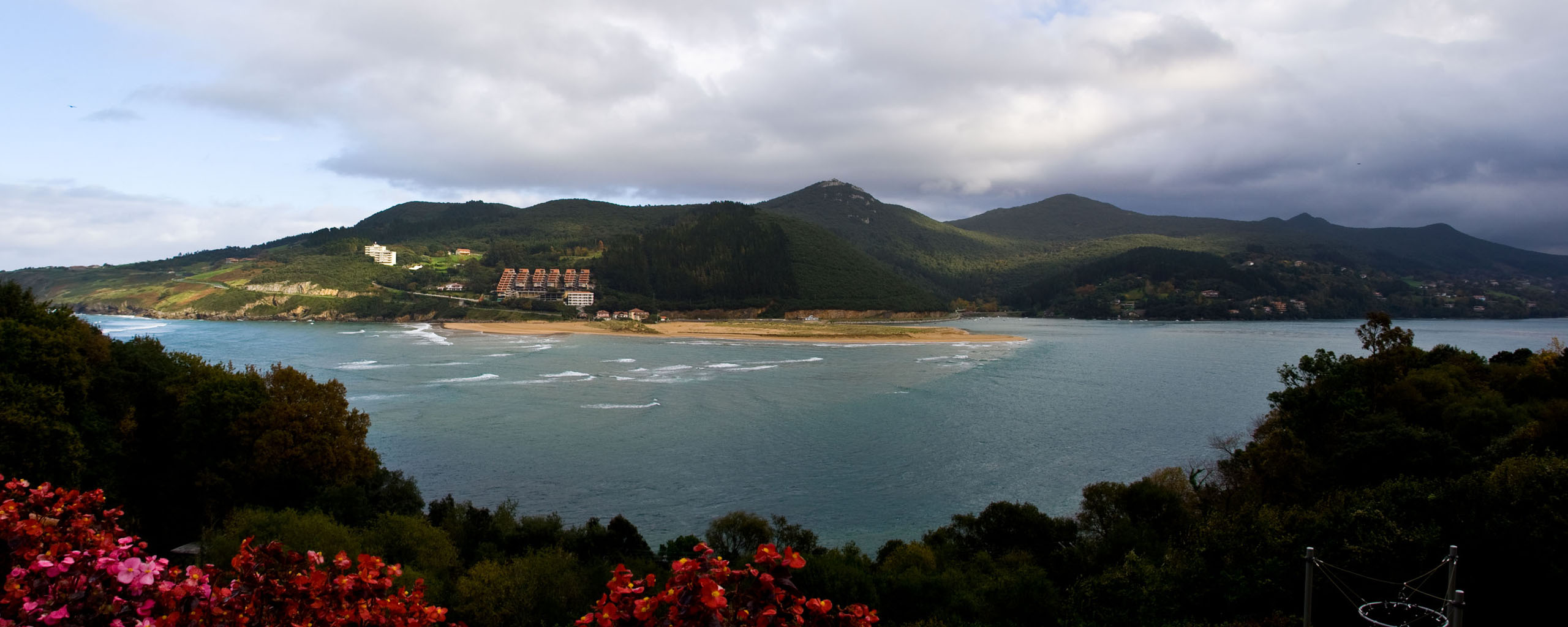
Coast near Mundaka, Biscay

== Physical geography ==
Mundaca shares its western border with the town of Bermeo, to the South with Pedernales, and to the East and North with the Cantabrian Sea. The island of Ízaro (Bermeo) and the extensive Laida sandy area are located off its coast. The municipal area is concentrated around the port at the feet of Mount Katillotxu (1,105 ft) and the alto de Betrocol.

The Errekatxu creek flows through the Laidatxu beach.

The coastal location of Mundaka allows for a mild climate year-round, with infrequent frost and flurrying.

The Oka River, also known as the Mundaca River, sits between the town of Laida and Point Santa Catalina de Mundaca.

== Access ==
- By road: from Bilbao: N-631; from Amorebieta: N-635.
- Railway Bilbao-Bermeo line.
- Bus Bilbao-Bermeo.
- Puerto Mundaka.
- In summer time, a ferry connects the town with the beach of Laida.

== Population ==
Historical population
Year	Pop.	±%
1900	1,916	—
1930	1,812	−5.4%
1940	1,564	−13.7%
1950	1,573	+0.6%
1960	1,609	+2.3%
1970	1,495	−7.1%
1981	1,501	+0.4%
1991	1,639	+9.2%
2000	1,806	+10.2%
2018	1,836	+1.7%

The area has been populated since the Lower Paleolithic period, as attested to by the caves of Santimamiñe on the other side of the estuary and deposits found in Portuondo.

Later the Romans arrived, attracted by the marble of Ereño and whose presence bears witness to a branch of Roman roads in Balmaseda that reaches Bermeo.

It is speculated by some that the area was at one point inhabited by Vikings, who according to some authors, justify the presence of blond hair and blue eyes on the Basque coast, unlike the interior of the Basque region. Anton Erkoreka asserts its presence in the 9th century based on Arabic chronicles, medieval stories, and other anthropological data, while Jon Juaristi believes the presence of Northern European phenotypes could be the result of a small presence of exiled Saxons dethroned by the Vikings.

In 1876, the population was estimated to be around 2,000 people. The population peaked in 1911, reaching 2,284 residents, with population swings in the coming decades due to socioeconomic conditions. In 1915, the population was estimated to have fallen to 1,918 people. In the 1950s, the population had dropped to 1,500 residents. In 1981, the population was 1,529. In 1991, the population slightly increased 1,641. In 2001, the population increased 1,853. In 2011, the population saw a slight increase to 1,943. In 2021, the population saw a slight dip to 1,859.

== Government ==
The municipal power while the "immunity of Vizcaya" continued was exercised by the inhabitants. These were the only ones who could adopt ordinances, usages and customs that were to govern themselves, due to their nature of autonomous community and without having to submit to the terms for the granting of the Charter puebla, as happened to the villas. Thus, all mundaqueses, including the widows who were head of the family and could vote, gathered in Assembly or "stop cross" to achieve their agreements, chairing the "' faithful Alderman"'. Between the faculties of the faithful was the representation of the autonomous community in the County Councils of Biscay until they ceased to meet due to the abolition of immunity in 1876. Since then, the post became known as Mayor. Since the transition, the Basque Nationalist Party governs the Town Hall with an absolute majority.

== Municipal Elections 2011 ==
Four parties stood in the 2011 municipal elections; EAJ-PNV, Bildu, PSE-EE and PP. These were the results:

- EAJ-PNV: 756 votes (6 Councillors)
- Bildu: 451 votes (3 Councillors)
- PSE-EE: 21 votes (0 Councillors)
- PP: 8 votes (0 Councillors)

This gave PNV control of the council. Bildu, a pro-Basque independence coalition, won 3 seats, while PSE-EE and popular failed to achieve representation due to the low number of votes obtained.

== Supramunicipal organizations ==
- Busturialdea Water Consortium
- Association of Social Services of Biscay
- Regional abattoir
- Committee of mountain farming Guernica-Bermeo – Urremendi
- Board of Trustees of the Urdaibai biosphere reserve
- Association of Basque municipalities – EUDEL
- Center for enterprise development and Industrial of Biscay
- Center of professional initiation Guernica-Bermeo
- Local Charity Board

== Economy ==
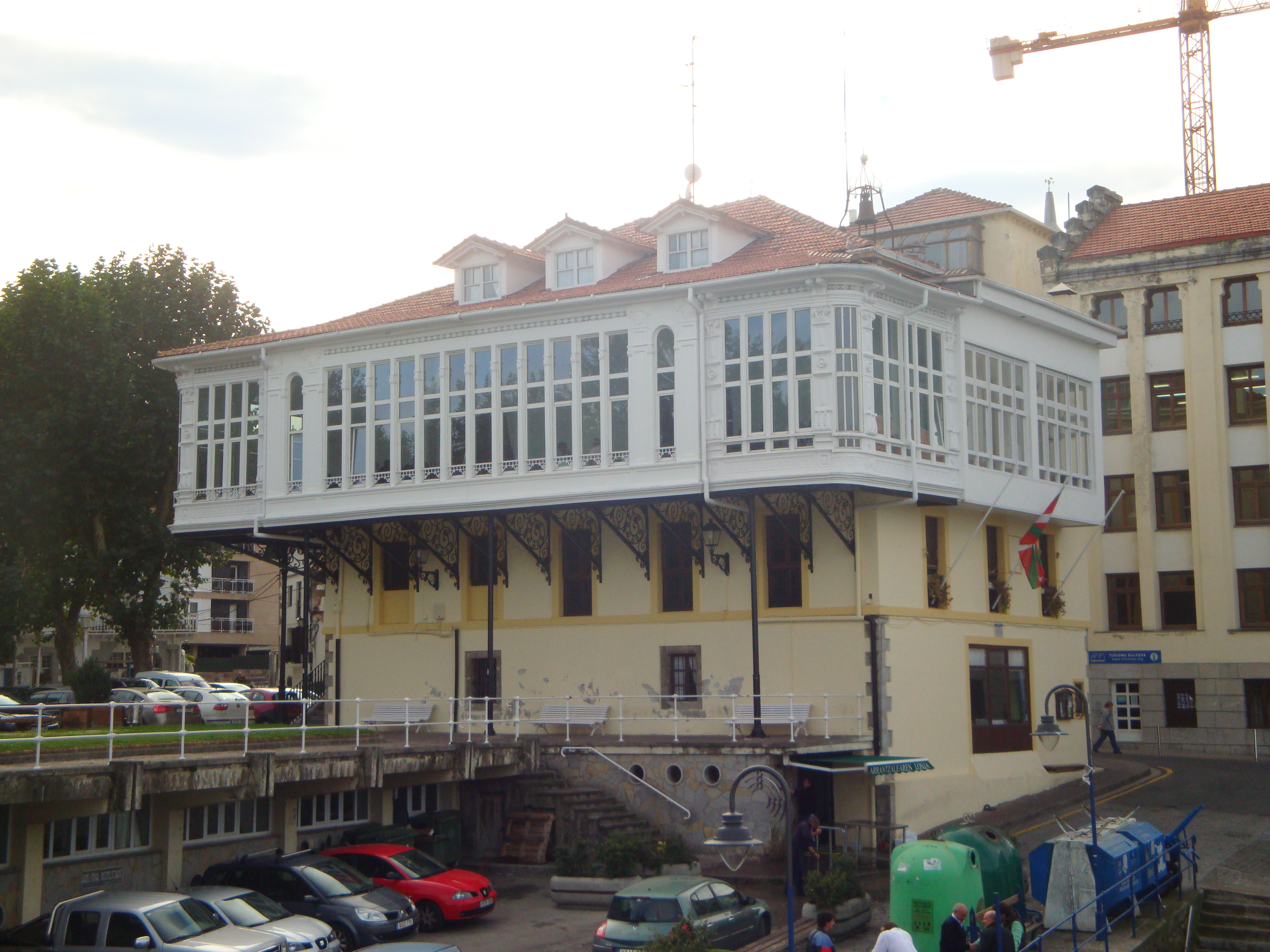
Casino.

- Unemployment: in 1999, there were 58 people registered at INEM, which meant a decrease of 34 per cent over the previous year.
- Primary sector: the village has been fundamentally devoted to the fishing and maritime trade since ancient times, having hosted an important Guild of fishermen. Currently, fishing activity has gone down significantly, leaving no fishermen in the village.
- Secondary sector: the industrial tradition of the locality is non-existent, with the exception of a shipyard, whose lands were destined for the construction of housing at the end of the 20th century. A canning industry was installed in 2002 in Mundaca next to the port of Bermeo. In 2003 the estate Lamiaran with 30.732 m^{2} of industrial land was opened.
- Tertiary sector: is currently the booster of the economy of Mundaca mainly in summer when the population reaches five-fold. Mundaca has two dozen bars, 8 restaurants and 3 hotels, as well as a campsite of 1st category with "bungalows". The summer season extends during the fall with the arrival of the practitioners of surf.

== Notable people ==
- Jaun Zuria; According to the legend, first Lord of Biscay.
- Francisco I Earl of Luzarraga, Admiral of the Navy.
- Rodrigo of Portuondo, marine.
- José Manuel Etxeita, writer "euskaldun" and ship's captain. Last Spanish mayor of Manila.
- Ramon Mendezona, historical Communist militant.
- Gregorio Blasco, football goalkeeper.
- Jaime Anesagasti y Llamas, IV Bishop of Campeche (Mexico) in 1910. He was born in Mundaka on 23 May 1863, D. Miguel Antonio de Anesagasti y Llamas (born in Mundaka) and Doña María Antonia Margarita de Jesús Llamas Santoscoy (native of Guadalajara, Mexico). He died 3 October 1910 in Campeche.
- Edorta Jimenez, writer of Basque literature.
- Irati Jimenez, author of Basque literature.
- Bernardo Maria Garro Basterrechea, "Otxolua", writer and translator regarding.

== Culture and tourism ==
=== Cuisine ===
The main dish is, by maritime tradition, fish, and especially the bass of Mundaka.

=== Monuments and unique buildings ===
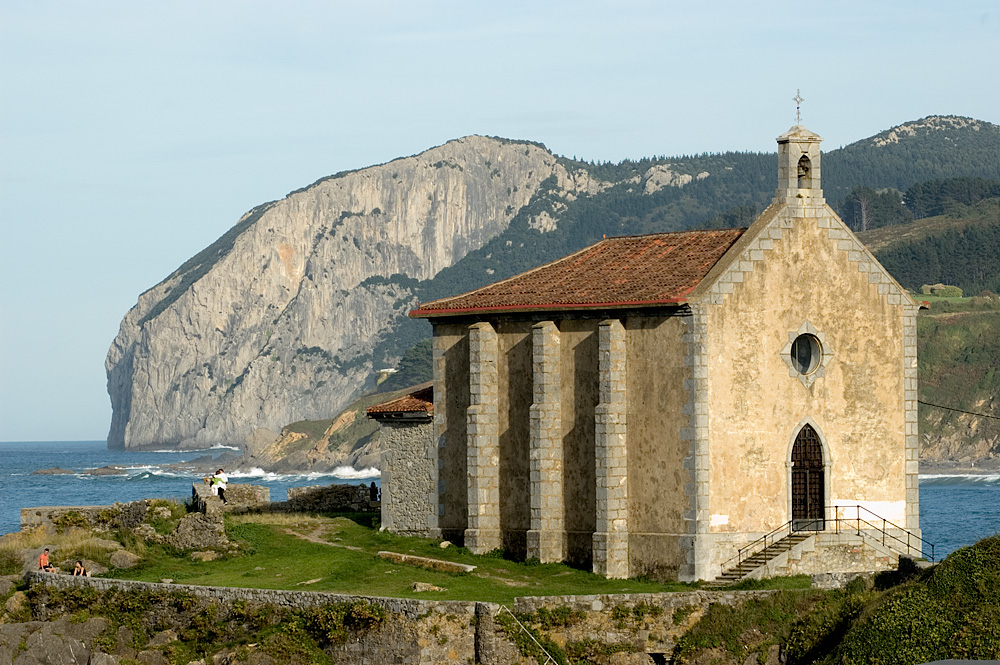
Chapel of Santa Catalina.

- Library, old hospital for pilgrims of the Camino de Santiago, traveled by those landing in Bermeo.
- Chapel of Santa Catalina, 19th century, situated on the peninsula that bears its name and the walls that surround it, remains of a Fort of the 19th century.
- St. Mary's Church. Located in the vantage point of the village, with its back to the sea. Its construction began in Romanesque style in the 10th century, but it gives rise to a new Gothic plant in the 16th century after its destruction. Its interior is of an undeniable artistic value. A nave and three equal sections to cover, surely a neoclassical and neo-Gothic Tower of the 19th century.
- Cross of Kurtzio: 17th century, located in the square that bears its name.
- Society Fraternity Mundaquesa (casino).
- Palace of Larrínaga.
- Old town, next to the port.
- Town Hall.

=== Natural spaces ===
- Located in the north end of the Biosphere Reserve of Urdaibai, the town has two exceptional viewpoints in the high part if Portuondo and the vantage point of the towne, from which you can see the sands and the mouth of the Mundaka estuary. This is the starting point of the path which goes back the up to estuary Guernica.

== Sports ==
=== Surfing ===
Mundaka is well renowned worldwide for its quality of surf. Huge swells roll in from the Bay of Biscay and slam into the rocky coastline of the Basque Country. The estuary at Mundaka has created a perfect sandbar which forms hollow waves that can be watched from the town's harbor wall. Mundaka was formerly one of the sites of the World Championship Tour of Surfing.

Some great surfers have marked their legacy on Mundaka such as Andy Irons, Taj Burrow, Bobby Martinez, Kelly Slater, Mark Occilupo and Joel Parkinson.

== Parties and events ==
- Carnival Sunday – "Aratuste".
- 23 June-midsummer or Sanjuanada, bonfire and burning of the witch serving ancestral rites prior to Christianity to the sound of the txistu.
- 29 June – San Pedro, feast.
- 22 July – Magdalena.
- Last week of August – "Euskal Jaia" (Basque party): costumes, craft market, music, exhibition of Basque rural sports ("Herri-kirolak"), Basque pelota, etc.
- 1 November – Txakoli day.
- 25 November – Catherine party Isla de Santa Catalina.
