= Piquillo pepper =

Variety of chili pepper

Piquillo
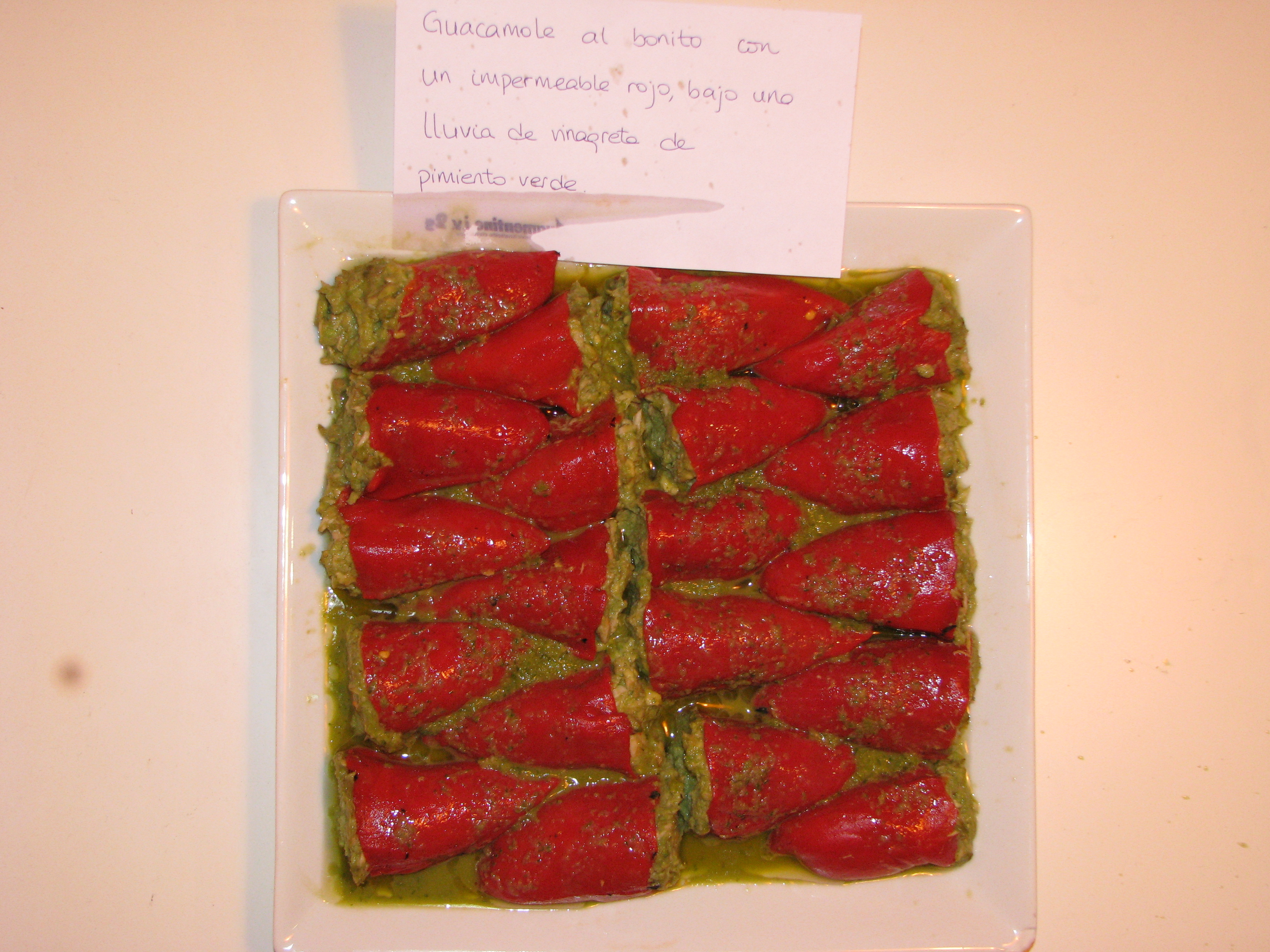
- Stuffed piquillo peppers
- Species: Capsicum annuum
- Origin: Spain
- Heat: Mild

The piquillo pepper (pimientos del piquillo in Spanish) is a variety of chili pepper known for having a sweet taste with little to no heat. The fruits are about 7 cm long and grow productively in pots. They are traditionally grown in Northern Spain near the town of Lodosa. The name ‘piquillo’ is derived from the Spanish word for "little beak".

Typically, the peppers are hand-picked during two harvest seasons between September and December. They are roasted over embers, which gives them a distinct sweet, spicy flavour, more akin to bell peppers than chilli peppers. The peppers are then peeled and grilled in a grill bar, then marinated with salt, pepper, and olive oil. Finally, they are de-seeded by hand and packed into jars or tins. Piquillo peppers are often stuffed with meat, seafood, or cheese, and served as tapas across Spain.

Piquillo peppers are high in fiber and vitamins C, E, A, and B. In particular, their vitamin C content is very high, comparable to citrus fruits.
