= Jaun Zuria =

Mythical lord of Biscay

Jaun Zuria (Basque for "the White Lord") is the mythical first lord and founder of the Lordship of Biscay, who defeated the Leonese and Asturian troops in the also-mythical Battle of Padura, in which he chased off the invaders to the Malato Tree, establishing there the borders of Biscay. There are three accounts of its legend, one by the Portuguese count Pedro Barcelos and two by the chronicler Lope García de Salazar. According to the legend, Jaun Zuria had been born from a Scottish or English princess who had been visited by the Basque deity Sugaar in the village of Mundaka.

It has been suggested that Jaun Zuria might have the same origin or be the same mythical figure as Olaf the White, an Irish Viking sea-king from the 9th century.

== Accounts of the legend ==
=== Bienandanzas e Fortunas ===
The Basque chronicler Lope García de Salazar (1399–1476) mentions don Çuria on his Bienandanzas e Fortunas, book that he begins to write in 1471. He speaks of the daughter of a Scottish king, who arrives by ship at Mundaka and gives birth to a son in the village. Afterward, both mother and son move to Busturia, where the boy spends most of his childhood. When the son is 22 years old, the Biscayans choose him to be captain of their troops to stop the progress of the army of an Asturian king's son. He is chosen because of his royal blood, as it had been a requirement of the Asturian prince, in order to engage in a formal battle. The Asturian prince and his army are defeated in Arrigorriaga on the Battle of Padura or Arrigorriaga. Thus, the Biscayans choose him to be the first Lord of Biscay and Lord of Durangaldea, and give him the Basque name of Jaun Zuria, that is the White Lord, because of the whiteness of his skin and hair.

=== Book of the Lineages ===
The Portuguese Count of Barcelos Pedro Alfonso speaks about a similar story on a similar background, on his Libro dos Linhagems ("Book of the Lineages"). According to him, Biscay was a Lordship before even Castile had kings, but for a lot of time it remained without a lord. An Asturian count named don Moñino knew about this situation, and thus forced the Biscayans to give him as a tribute a cow, an ox and a white horse every year. Soon thereafter, arrived by ship a brother of the king of England named From. He came with one of his sons, named Fortun Froes, and they settled in the village of Busturia. From, being told about the tribute, promised to defend the Biscayans as long as they called him Lord. The Asturian count then, engaged in battle against From and the Biscayans, and was defeated near Arrigorriaga. After From's passing, Fortun Froes became the Lord of Biscay.

== See also ==
- Lordship of Biscay
- Basque mythology
