= José Manuel Etxeita =

Basque writer (1841–1915)

Jose Manuel de Etxeita y Luzarraga
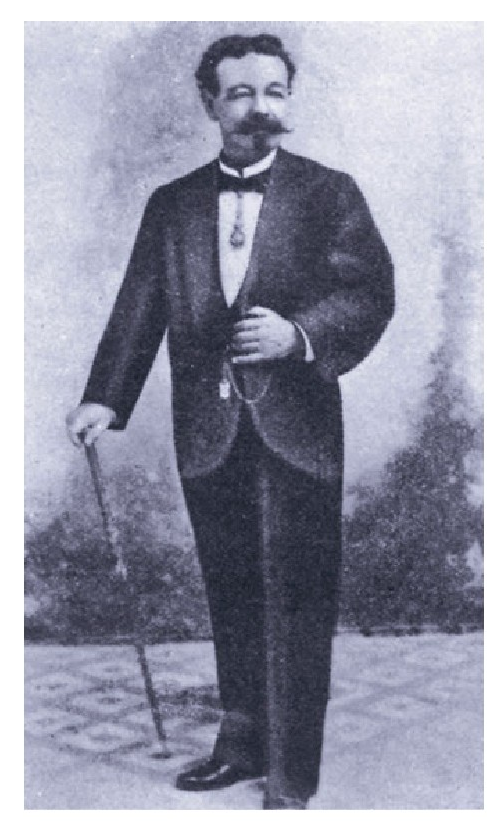
- Born: 14 December 1841; Mundaka, Vizcaya, Basque Region, Spain
- Died: 1 March 1915 (aged 73); Mundaka, Vizcaya, Pais Vasco, Spain
- Occupations: Politician, Writer
- Spouse: Juana Bauptista de Abaroa y Ajuria-Goxeazcoa
- Children: Salvador Ricardo
- Parent(s): Marcos Etxeita Momosito, Maria Josefa de Luzaraga Abaroa

Jose Manuel Etxeita Luzarraga (Spanish: José Manuel Echeita Luzárraga) (14 December 1841 - 1 March 1915) was a Basque writer and politician from Spain who later lived in the Spanish East Indies.

== Early and personal life ==
Etxeita was born in Mundaka on 14 December 1841 to Marcos Etxeita Momosito, a Garay native and Maria Josefa Luzarraga Abaroa, from Mundaka. On 25 November 1967, he married Juana Abaroa Ajuria-Goxeazcoa They had one son, Salvador Ricardo, born 22 May 1871.

== Naval career and Philippine residency ==
Etxeita worked as a valet on ships traveling from Bilbao to Cuba from the age of 12. Etxeita became a captain after graduating from university in Bilbao and spent many years traveling throughout Europe, Asia, and the Americas. He eventually settled with his family in Manila, and began working for his cousin's company, Larrinaga and Co. He spent his first 16 years in the Philippines in charge of a sea port run by Larrinaga. He later became a member of the Kaia Commission, an advisor for the Tobacco and Management Society of the Philippines, a director of Navy, and President of the Chamber of Commerce. Etxeita was a business partner to General Valeriano Weyler and Camilo de Polaviega. He became mayor of Manila near the end of his career in the Philippines, and was the last Spaniard to hold the position.

In his retirement, he left politics and business in the Philippines and returned to Mundaka.

== Writing career and legacy ==
Etxeita became a writer in his old age, writing many poems, as well as translating stories into his native Basque. He wrote novels such as: Josetxo (1909), Jaioterri maitea (1910), and Au, ori ta bestia (1913).

In 1969, the Jose Manuel Etxeita Municipal Library of Mundaka was named in honor of him.

100 years following his passing, the City Council of Mundaka held a day in his honor on July 10, 2015.

He died on 1 March 1915, and was buried in his hometown.
