= Lodosa =

Coordinates: 42.424215°N 2.078578°W

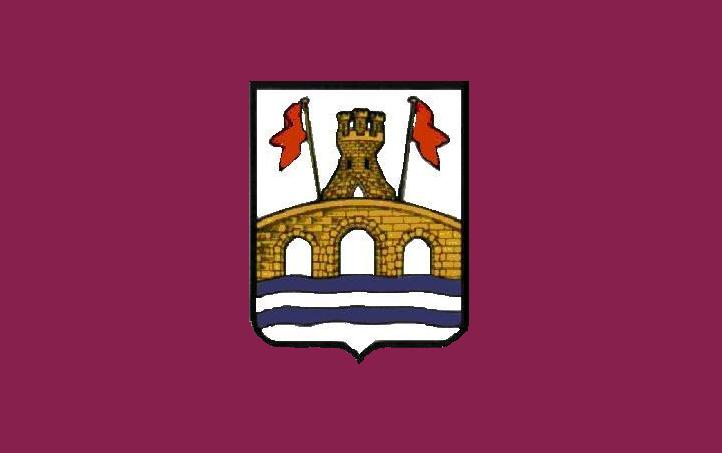
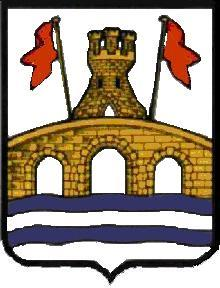
- Flag Coat of arms
- Interactive map of Lodosa
- Country: Spain
- Autonomous Community: Navarre

Government
  - Mayoress: Pablo Azkona (LOIU)

Area
  - Total: 45.34 km^{2} (17.51 sq mi)
- Elevation: 320 m (1,050 ft)

Population (2025-01-01)
  - Total: 4,964
  - Density: 109.5/km^{2} (283.6/sq mi)
- Time zone: UTC+1 (CET)
  - Summer (DST): UTC+2 (CEST)
- Website: www.lodosa.es

Lodosa (Basque: Lodizkoa) is a small town of around 5,000 people located in the province and autonomous community of Navarre, northern Spain. Located along the river Ebro, in a largely agricultural area, the town of Lodosa is known for its piquillo peppers (pimientos del piquillo), and its natural environment. The largest nearby city is Pamplona.

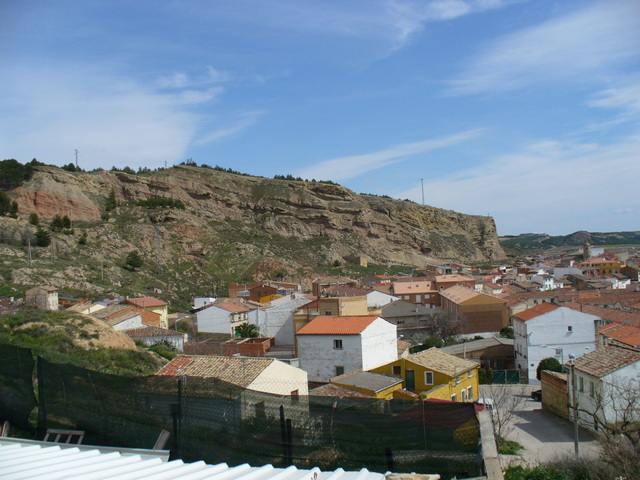
View of the municipality of Lodosa, Navarra
