= Laida =

Gram panchayat in Sambalpur, Odisha, India

Coordinates: 21.712931°N 84.193365°E

Laida is a gram panchayat in the district of Sambalpur in the state of Odisha in India.
