= Ízaro Island =

Island in the Cantabrian Sea, Spain

Ízaro
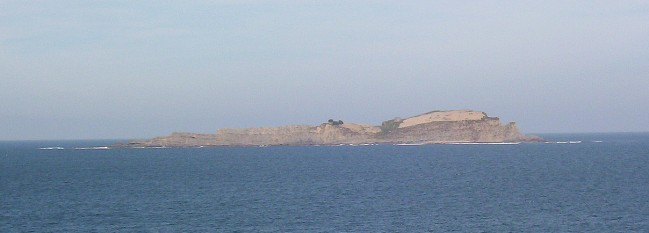
- Interactive map of Ízaro

Geography
- Location: Cantabrian Sea
- Coordinates: 43°25′30″N 2°40′57″W
- Adjacent to: 3 km from Bermeo and 2.2 km from Mundaka
- Length: 0.675 km (0.4194 mi)
- Width: 0.150 km (0.0932 mi)
- Highest elevation: 44.5 m (146 ft)

Administration
- Spain
- Bermeo

Demographics
- Population: uninhabited

Ízaro is an island of Spain in the waters of the Cantabrian Sea, situated on the coast of the province of Biscay, off the towns of Bermeo and Mundaka, at a distance of 3 km from the former and 2.2 km from the latter. The island belongs to the municipality of Bermeo. It occupies the centre of the mouth of the Mundaka estuary and is flanked by the headlands of Ogoño and Matxitxako. It lies within the natural area of Urdaibai.

== Description ==
The island is elongated and triangular in shape, oriented in a NW–SE direction. The highest and widest part is the SE end. At its widest point it measures approximately 150 m, its length is 675 m, and its maximum height is 44.5 m. The northwestern tip is called Archicote. To the northeast of the island, roughly 200 m away, there is a rock known as Potorro-harri or Harri-ederra. To the southeast lies a natural pier or "harbour" of Ízaro.

== History ==
The Bishop of Calahorra, Diego López de Zúñiga, and Friar Martín de Arteaga founded a Franciscan monastery in 1422, which was built on the upper plateau. Its isolated setting gave it a certain renown, and it was visited by three monarchs: Henry IV of Castile in 1457, Ferdinand the Catholic in 1476, and Isabella the Catholic in 1483. One of the legends told about the island is that in 1594 it was sacked by soldiers travelling in a fleet of 14 ships commanded by Sir Francis Drake, causing serious damage, though they did not burn it; however, historians and experts on the subject agree that this story is not based in fact, as there is no evidence whatsoever that Sir Francis Drake sailed those waters at that time. Far more likely, however, is that Ízaro was sacked by French Huguenot corsairs, who were very active in the Cantabrian Sea during that period. In 1719 the monastery was abandoned, leaving the island uninhabited. Virtually no trace of it remains today. After that, the main human presence consisted of visits by young campers, until the board of the Urdaibai Biosphere Reserve, of which the island forms part, prohibited such activity.

In 1813, Ízaro Island served as a storage site for ammunition and supplies during the Napoleonic Wars, as well as for pontoons (old ships used as prisons) for prisoners.

== Wildlife ==
Ízaro is an important seabird colony; the most abundant species is the yellow-legged gull, though the European storm petrel and the little egret also nest there. In earlier times rabbits were kept on the island (most likely brought by the monastery friars), and in the 19th century the island was leased out for sheep grazing.

== Cultural activities ==
Its shores and surrounding waters are popular areas for scuba diving and recreational fishing, so in summer the area is busy with small sport-fishing vessels based in Bermeo, Mundaka, and Pedernales.

Local people have long speculated about the origin of the island; seen from Laga beach, at the northeastern end of the reserve, it has a shape similar to the Ogoño headland, which has given rise to the belief that in remote times it broke away from that rock and sank into the sea. In any case, the island forms part of the same geological unit as the Anzoras point, located on the right bank of the estuary.

In the 1980s, the island was the logo of Ízaro Films, whose title sequence showed the island from various angles and with several zooms while the company's theme music played.

=== La Magdalena feast ===
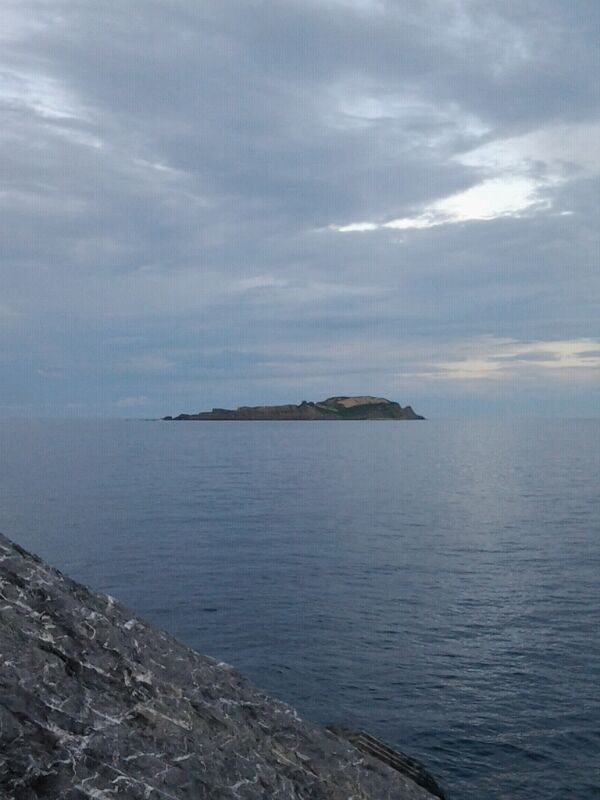
Ízaro island seen from Bermeo

Its ownership is the subject of a celebrated dispute between the town of Bermeo and the anteiglesia of Mundaka. The two localities have had several conflicts throughout history over their territorial boundaries, against the backdrop of their different administrative status. The anteiglesia of Mundaka defended its rights over the flatlands on which Bermeo had claims. These disputes even reached the Juntas Generales, which saw fit to appoint a commission to establish the boundaries, but even so the disputes were not fully resolved. Evidence of those conflicts survives in the belonging of Diminigus to Bermeo and the assignment of its church to the parish of Mundaka.

Perhaps from all those disputes arose the legend of the regatta of Ízaro, about whose actual occurrence some authors still express reservations. This legend holds that, in order to settle the ownership of the island, the people of Mundaka and Bermeo decided to contest a regatta under the arbitration of Elantxobe, since that locality, which had also claimed the island, apparently relinquished its pretensions in the end.

It was agreed that the regatta would begin at dawn. So it was held, and the oarsmen of the Bermeo trainera came out victorious, despite losing one of their men, who fell into the sea and drowned; the Mundaka tradition holds that the Bermeo men lit bonfires so that the rooster would crow earlier, giving them the advantage needed to win the race.

The regatta is currently commemorated on 22 July, the feast day of Mary Magdalene, with a twinning celebration between Mundaka, Bermeo, and Elantxobe. At the main event of the festival, the mayor of Bermeo — who on that day also acts as mayor of Elantxobe and Mundaka — throws a roof tile into the sea near the coast of Ízaro in the presence of the other two, saying "Honaino heltzen dira Bermeoko itxuginak" (this far reach the eaves of Bermeo), a formula by which Bermeo's possession of the island is renewed annually. The islanders then ascend to plant an ikurriña and the flag of Bermeo, making it almost the only day of the year that the island receives visitors.

== Images ==
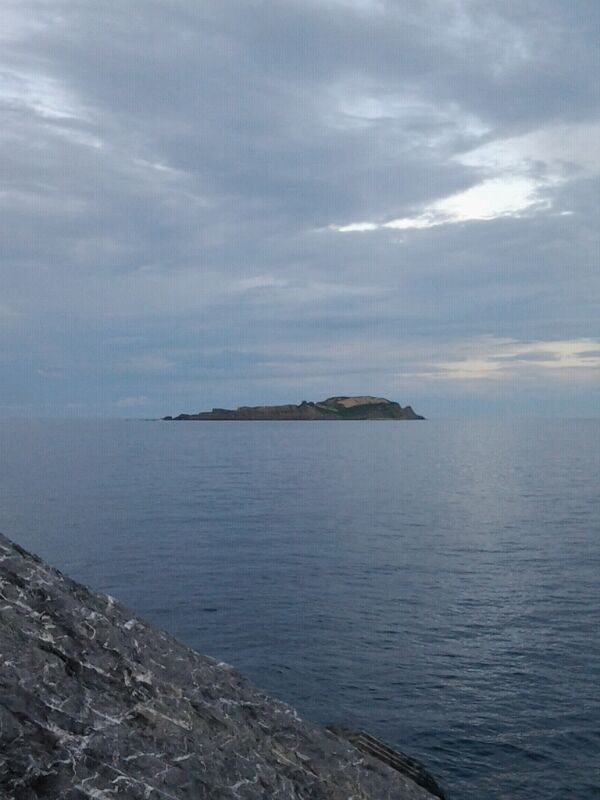
Ízaro seen from Bermeo.

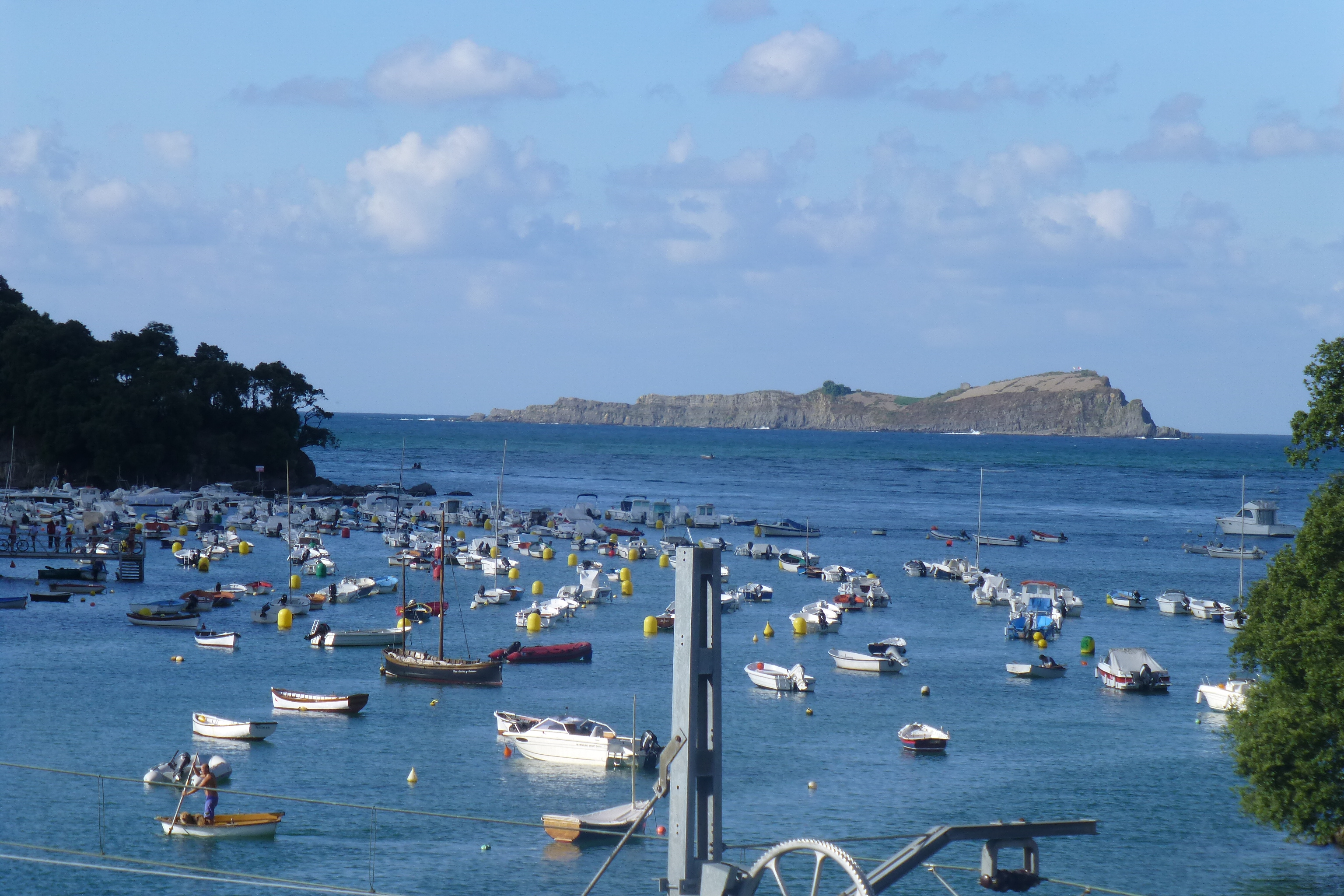
Ízaro island and the Portuondo inlet.

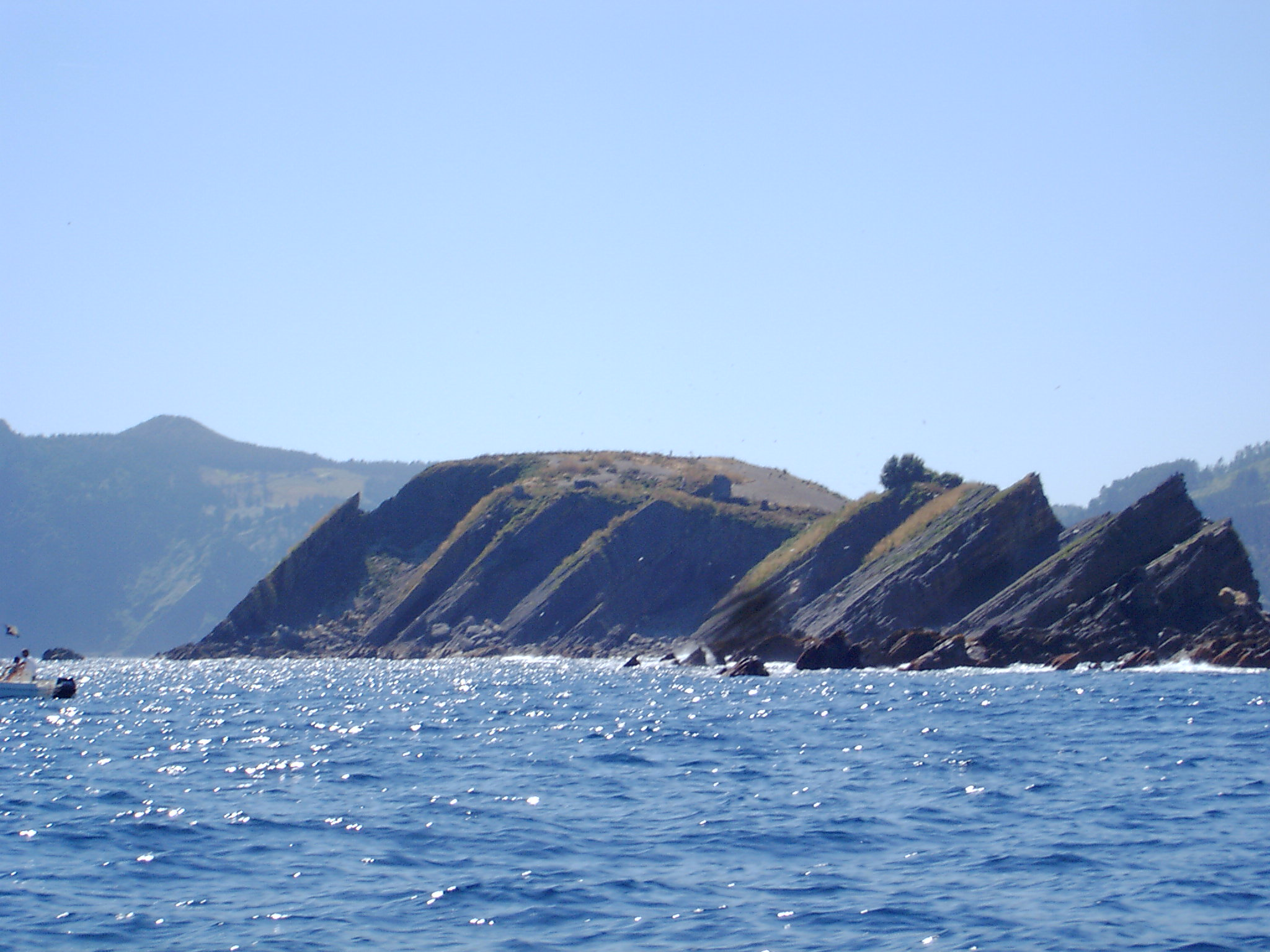
The island seen from the sea.

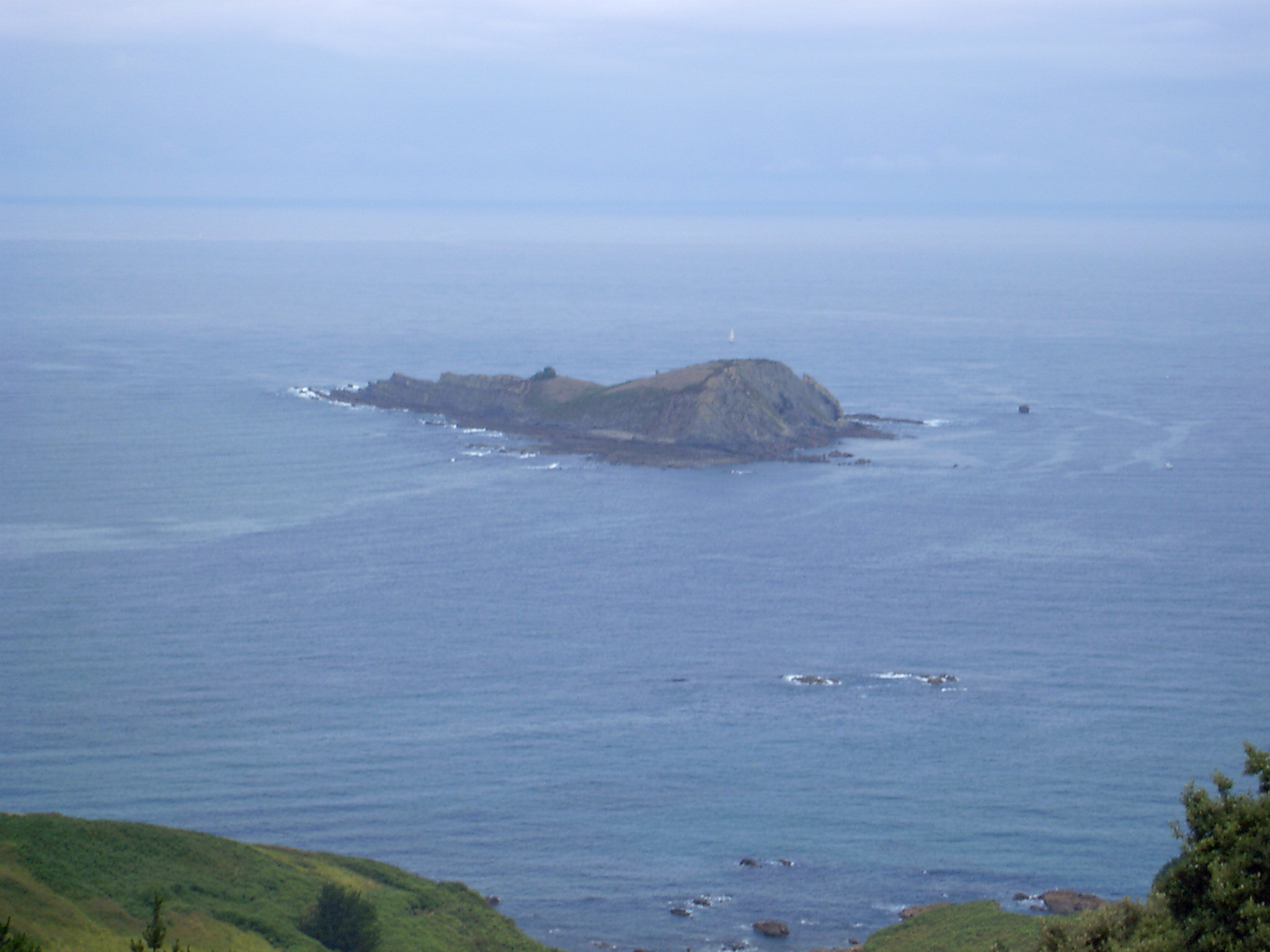
View from Ibarrangelu.

== See also ==
- Gaztelugatxe
