= Villanueva de Valdegovía =

Village in Álava, Spain

- Concejo
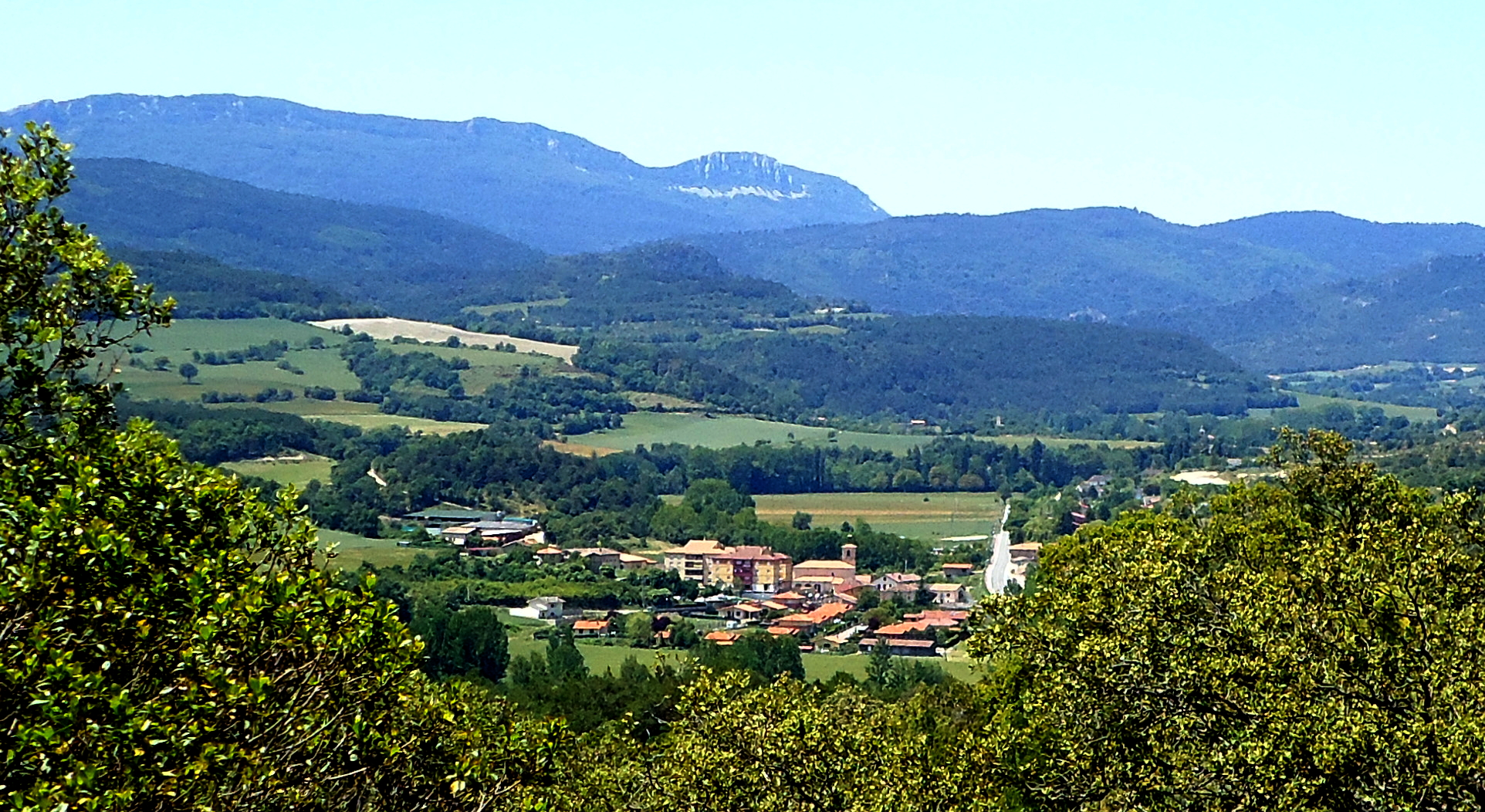
- View of Villanueva de Valdegovía

- Location within Álava Location within the Basque Country Location within Spain
- Coordinates: 42°50′53″N 3°05′53″W
- Country: Spain
- Autonomous community: Basque Country
- Province: Álava
- Comarca: Añana
- Municipality: Valdegovía/Gaubea

Area
  - Total: 11.33 km^{2} (4.37 sq mi)
- Elevation: 552 m (1,811 ft)

Population (2023)
  - Total: 145
  - Density: 12.8/km^{2} (33.1/sq mi)
- Postal code: 01426

Villanueva de Valdegovía (Basque: Uribarri Gaubea) is a village and concejo in the municipality of Valdegovía/Gaubea, in Álava province, Basque Country, Spain. It is the capital of the municipality.

The monastery of Santa María de Mardones was located in the village.
