= Bermeo =

- Municipality
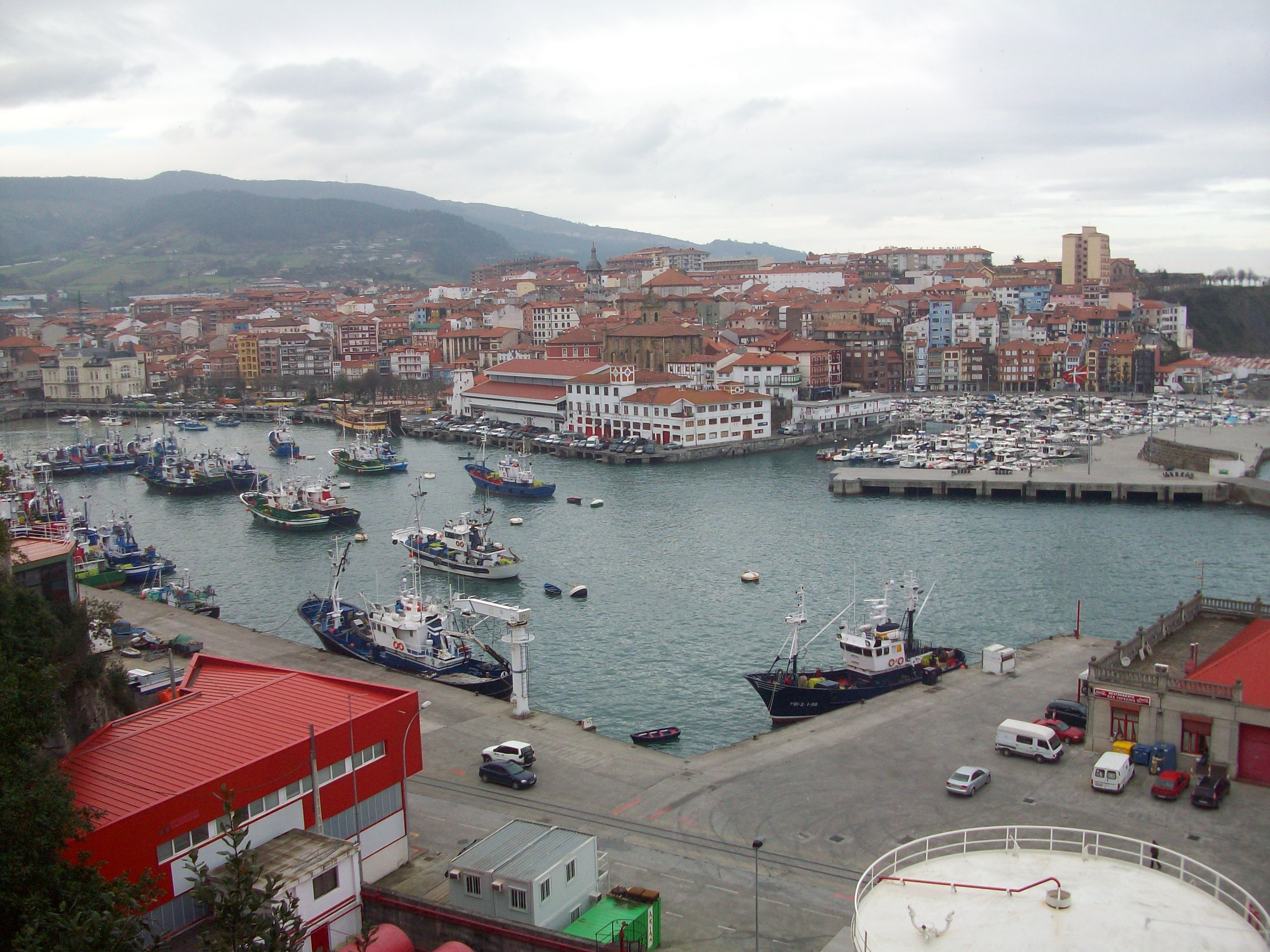

- Flag Coat of arms

- Location of Bermeo in the Basque Country Bermeo (Spain)
- Coordinates: 43°25′12″N 2°43′35″W
- Country: Spain
- Autonomous community: Basque Country
- Province: Biscay
- Comarca: Busturialdea
- Founded: 1236

Government
  - Mayor: Nadia Nemeh Shomaly (EH Bildu)

Area
  - Total: 34.12 km^{2} (13.17 sq mi)
- Elevation (AMSL): 11 m (36 ft)

Population (2025-01-01)
  - Total: 17,038
  - Density: 499.4/km^{2} (1,293/sq mi)
- Demonym: bermeotar
- Time zone: UTC+1 (CET)
  - Summer (DST): UTC+2 (CEST)
- Postal code: 48370
- Area code: +34 (Spain)
- Official language(s): Basque, Spanish
- Website: Official website

Bermeo is a town and municipality in the comarca of Busturialdea. It is in the province of Biscay, which is part of the autonomous region of the Basque Country in northern Spain.

With a population of 16,765, it is the most important fishing port in the Basque Country. The town was founded in 1236, and is the largest in Busturialdea. Bermeo was the provincial capital of Biscay from 1476 to 1602.

Tourist attractions include the island of Gaztelugatxe, the Ercilla Tower (a fishing museum), San Juan Gate and the port. Bermeo is connected by Euskotren Trena and BizkaiBus to Bilbao. It has a number of neighbourhoods: Arana, Artike, Agirre, San Andres, Almike, Arronategi, San Migel, Demiku, Mañu and San Pelaio.

== History ==
Bermeo's history dates back to the monastery of San Juan of Gaztelugatxe in 1051. In 1082, it is mentioned by Don Lope lñiguez as "Sancti Michaelis Arcangeli in Portu of Vermelio". Ferdinand II of Aragon named the town the capital of Biscay on 31 July 1476, a position it held until 1602. Many documents have been destroyed by fire; notable fires occurred in 1297, 1347, 1360, 1422 and 1504. The founding of Bilbao in 1300 also coincided with decline in Bermeo.

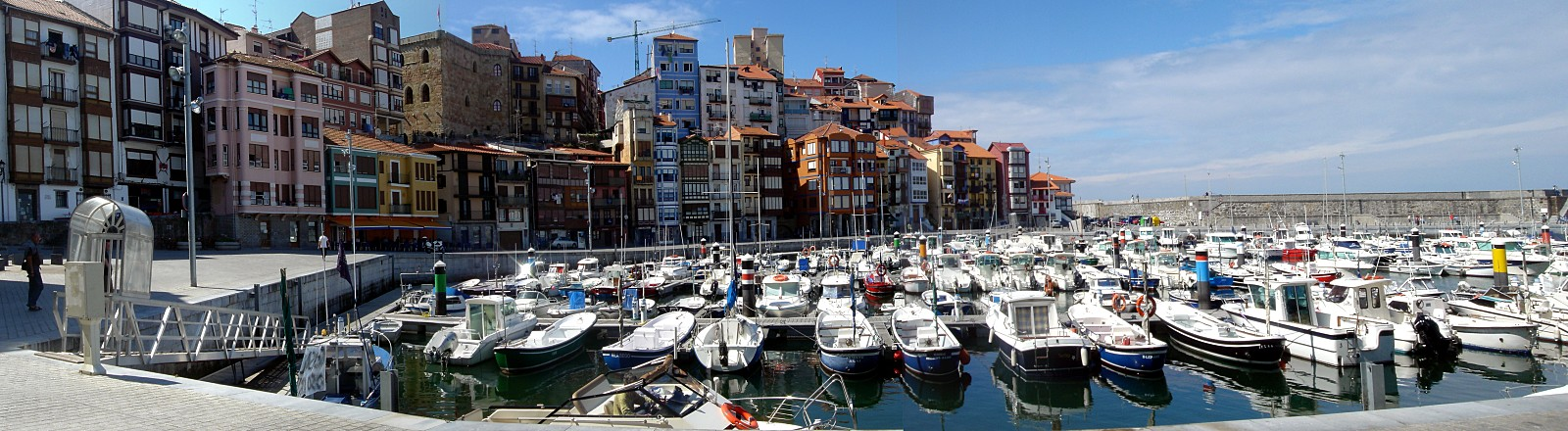
Bermeo's marina

== Climate ==
The town has an oceanic climate, with heavy rains in spring and late fall. The average annual minimum temperature is about 9 °C (48 °F), and the maximum is about 19 °C (66 °F). The record maximum temperature is 45 °C (113 °F), and the record minimum is −9 °C (16 °F).

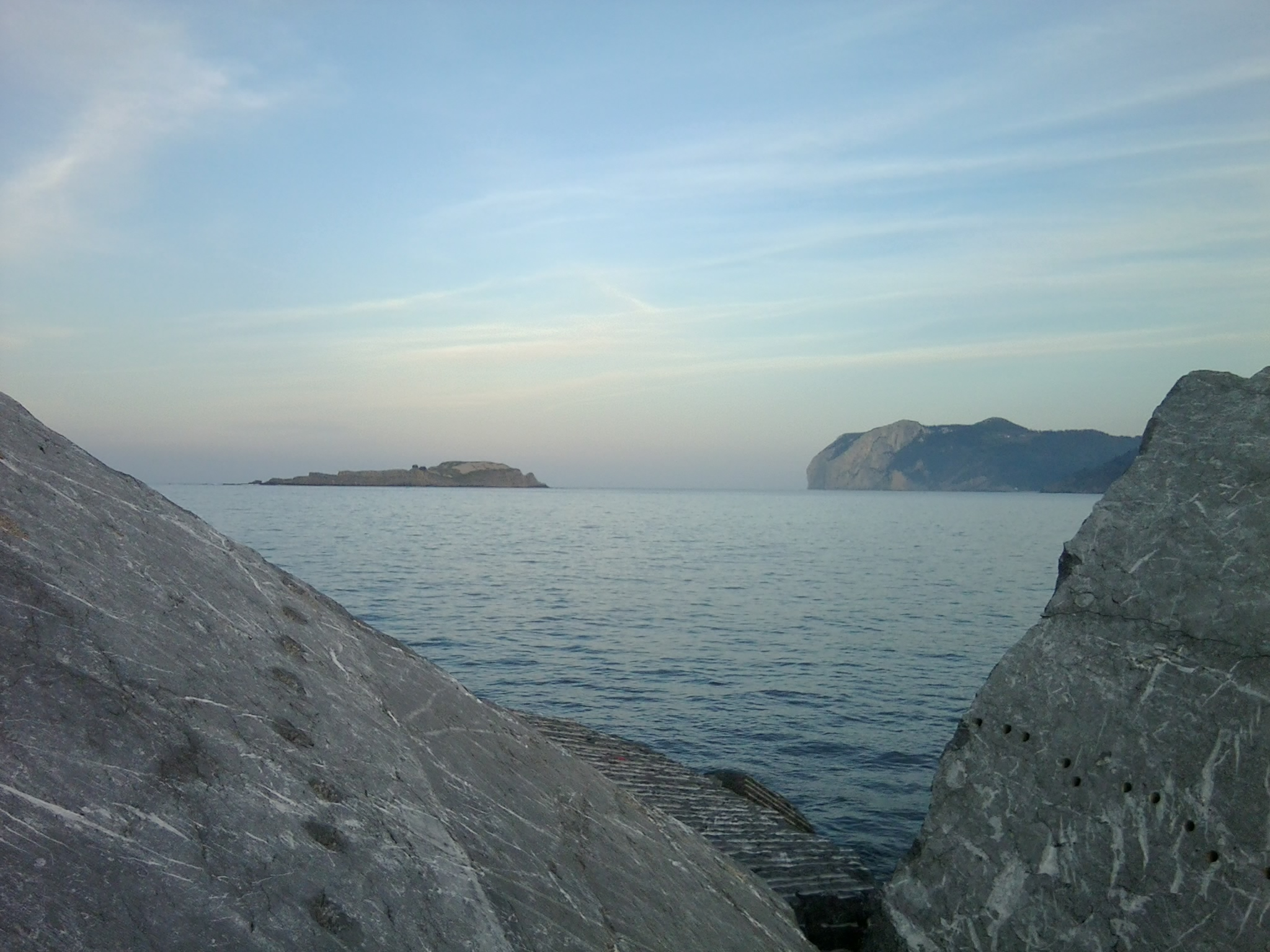
Izaro Island and Cape Ogoño

Climate data for Bermeo
Month	Jan	Feb	Mar	Apr	May	Jun	Jul	Aug	Sep	Oct	Nov	Dec	Year
Mean daily maximum °C (°F)	13.2 (55.8)	14.5 (58.1)	15.9 (60.6)	16.8 (62.2)	20.1 (68.2)	22.6 (72.7)	25.2 (77.4)	25.5 (77.9)	24.4 (75.9)	20.8 (69.4)	16.4 (61.5)	14 (57)	19.1 (66.4)
Mean daily minimum °C (°F)	4.7 (40.5)	5.1 (41.2)	5.7 (42.3)	7.1 (44.8)	10.1 (50.2)	12.6 (54.7)	14.8 (58.6)	15.2 (59.4)	13.2 (55.8)	10.8 (51.4)	7.6 (45.7)	6 (43)	9.4 (48.9)
Average precipitation mm (inches)	126 (5.0)	97 (3.8)	94 (3.7)	124 (4.9)	90 (3.5)	64 (2.5)	62 (2.4)	82 (3.2)	74 (2.9)	121 (4.8)	141 (5.6)	116 (4.6)	1,195 (47.0)
Source: Agencia Estatal de Meteorología

== Population ==
As a result of increased immigration due to industrialisation during the 1960s, the population grew rapidly. Although it began to decline during the 1990s, the population has increased again since 2000.

Bermeo population, 1704–2013

Year	Pop.	±%
1704	1,408	—
1784	3,711	+163.6%
1850	5,377	+44.9%
1900	9,636	+79.2%
1925	13,556	+40.7%
1960	15,846	+16.9%
1965	17,384	+9.7%

Year	Pop.	±%
1970	17,485	+0.6%
1975	18,312	+4.7%
1981	18,333	+0.1%
1986	17,923	−2.2%
1991	17,176	−4.2%
1996	16,938	−1.4%
2001	16,901	−0.2%

Year	Pop.	±%
2004	17,429	+3.1%
2007	17,069	−2.1%
2008	17,026	−0.3%
2010	17,078	+0.3%
2011	17,144	+0.4%
2012	17,159	+0.1%
2013	17,057	−0.6%

== Economy ==
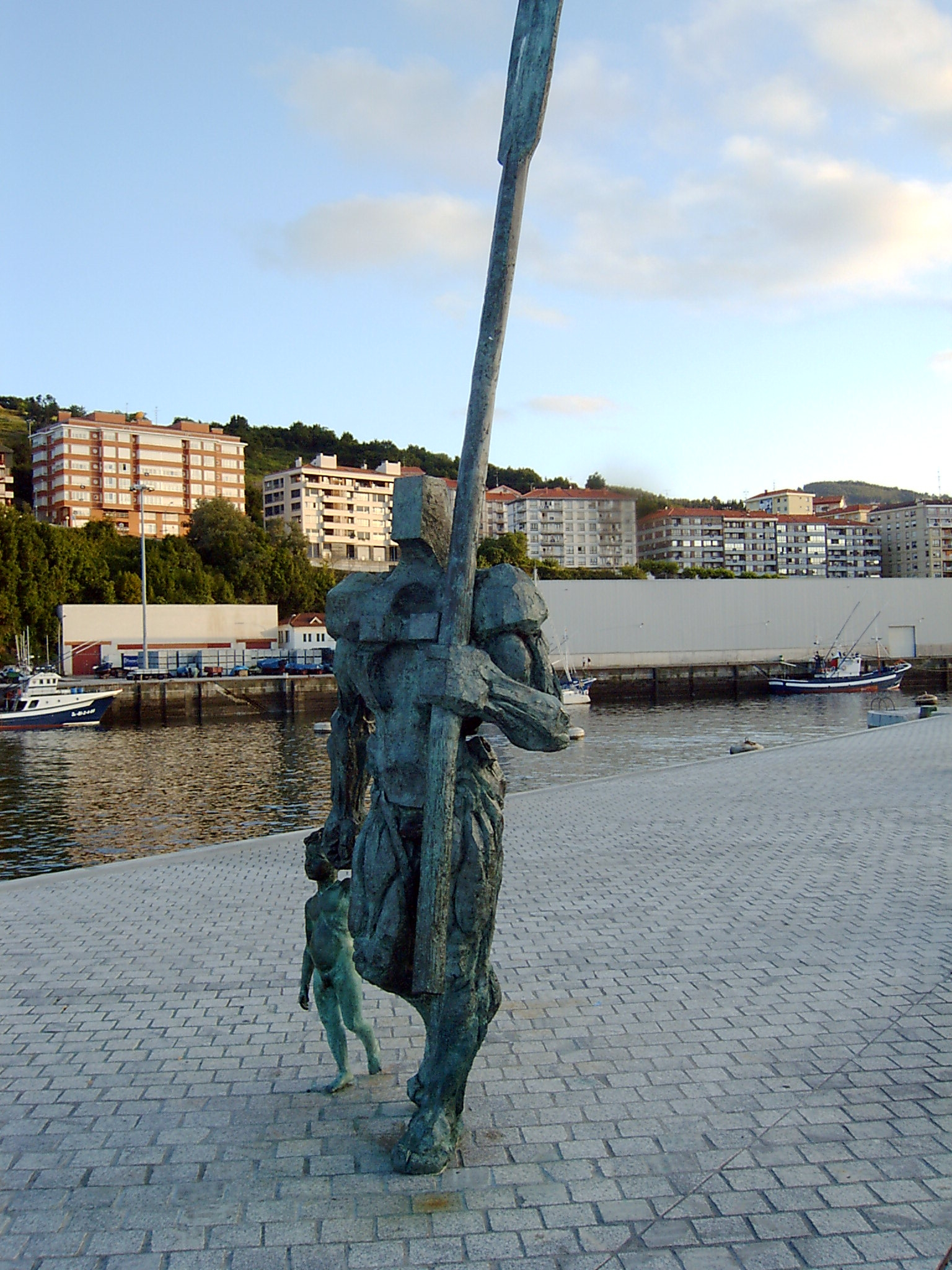
Itzulera by Casto Solano

Bermeo's economy is based on fishing, and its port is the town's chief source of revenue. It has a fleet of deep-sea vessels, and Bermeo's coastal fisheries are among the region's most important. In addition to fishing, diesel engines and generators are manufactured and the commercial port receives raw materials. Bermeo also has connections with the timber and undersea-gas industries.

== Transport ==
Bermeo is connected by road to Mungia (18 km [11 mi] away) by the BI-631, and to Gernika-Lumo (14 km [8.7 mi] away) by the BI-2235. The BI-3101 connects the town with Bakio, 12 km (7.5 mi) away. The capital, Bilbao (33 km [21 mi] away), is reached by the BI-631 and the BI-2235.

BizkaiBus connects Bermeo with Guernica, Amorebieta-Etxano, Bilbao, Derio and Bakio. Euskotren Trena connects the town directly with Bilbao, Guernica, Amorebieta-Etxano, Biscay and Gipuzkoa. Bermeo also has taxi and Bermibusa (urban bus) service.

== Attractions ==
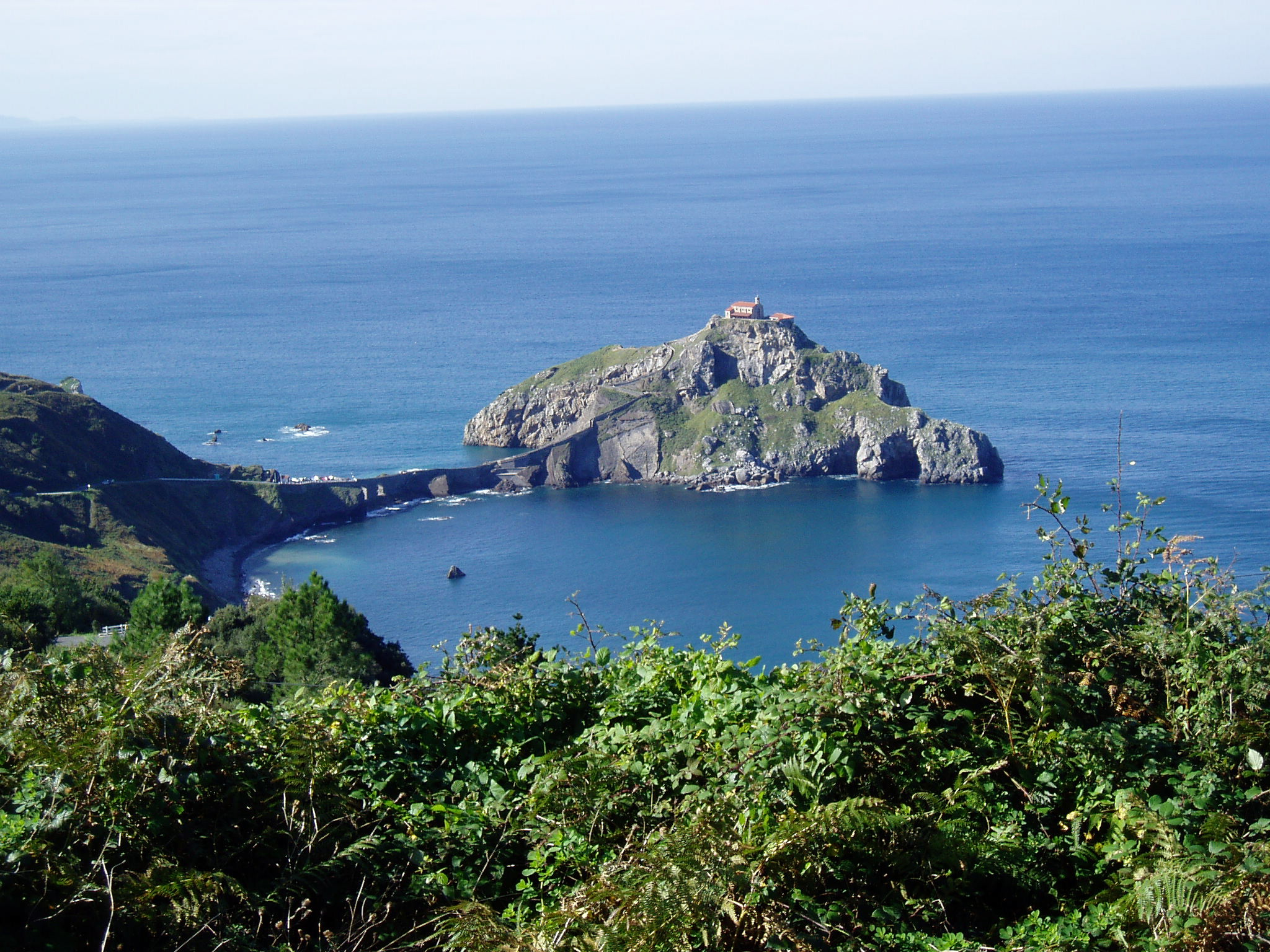
San Juan de Gaztelugatxe

On the road to Bakio is the lighthouse of Matxitxako, on the cape of the same name. Further along is Akatz Island, next to Gaztelugatxe (an island with the San Juan de Gaztelugatxe monastery). During the 14th century a castle topped the island, which was replaced by the monastery. On 29 August a mass celebrates the feast of San Juan. The island is a protected area.

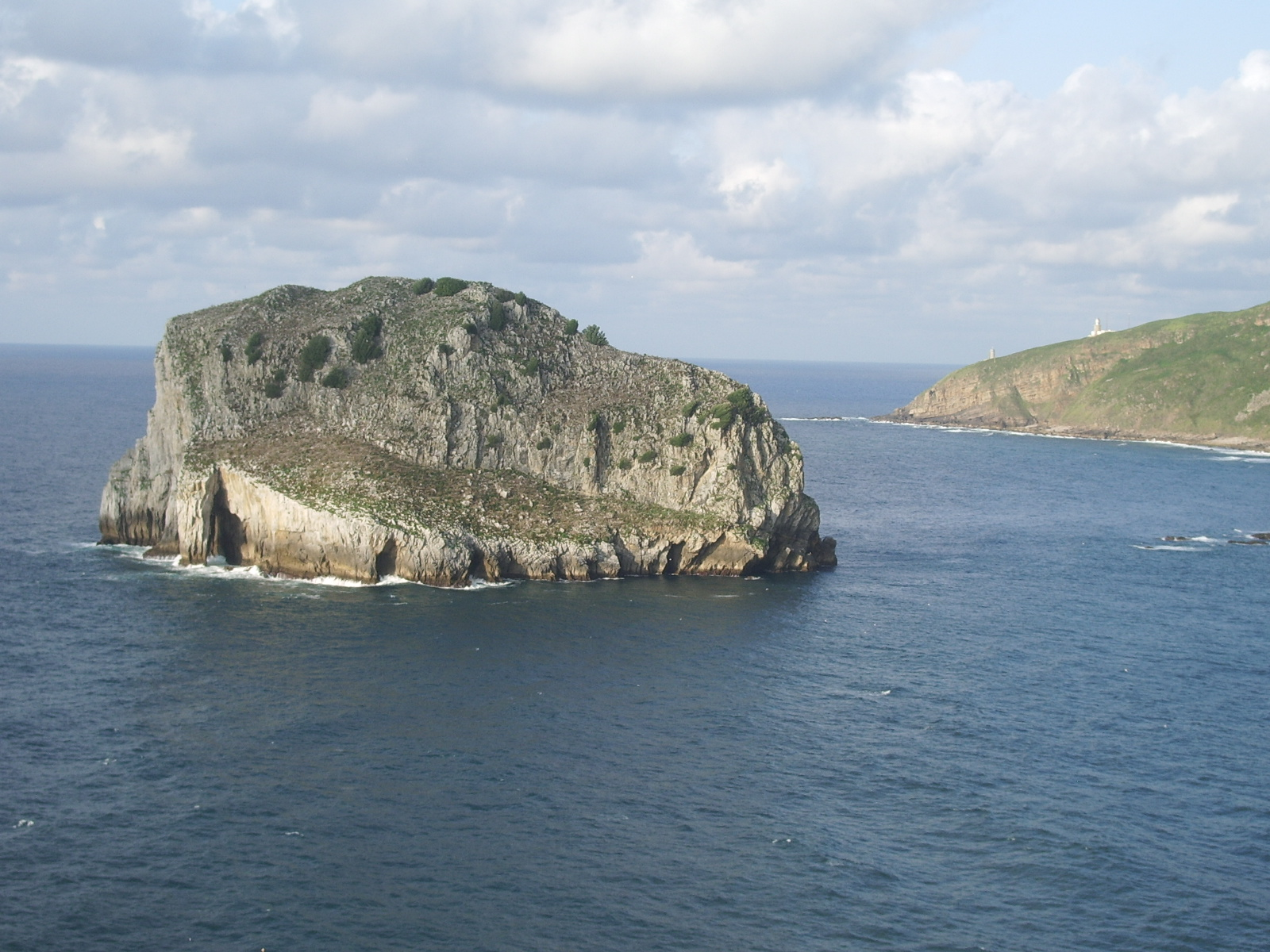
Akatz Island

Akatz Island, a small island next to Gaztelugatxe, has little vegetation but a significant nesting-bird population. On its cape is the Matxitxako lighthouse, which has good views of the coast and from which cetaceans may be seen. Izaro Island is part of the Urdaibai Reserve.

Bermeo's old town has many houses painted in different colours and narrow streets with squares. Aritzatxu is a small beach.

Ercilla Tower is the only remaining tower of 30 towers which defended Bermeo during the Middle Ages. In the old port, it was built at the end of the 15th century and housed the Ercilla family (including Alonso de Ercilla y Zúñiga, author of The Araucana). In addition to its military use, it housed fishermen and warehoused fish. It was renovated in 1948 with Gothic arches as the Fisherman's Museum; additional renovation was done in 1984 and 1985.

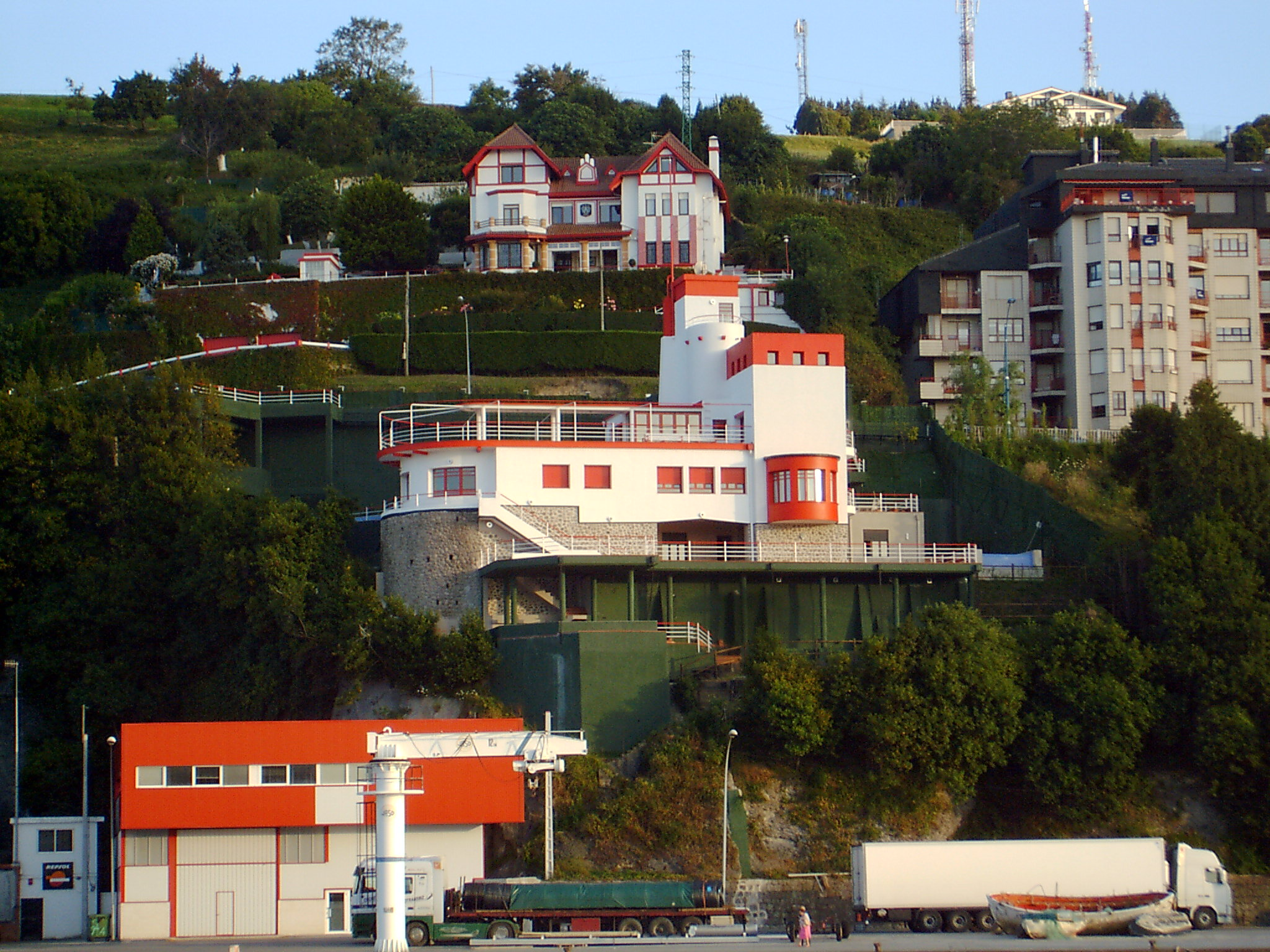
Kikunbera house

Bermeo's town hall, in Sabino Arana Goiri Square, was built in 1732. With two clocks on its facade, it is one of the town's Artistic Historical Monuments.

The Kikunbera house, in Basque Rationalist style, was designed to resemble a ship and has been an Artistic Historical Monument since 1995. Batzoki is a modernist building by Pedro Ispizua.

== Gallery ==
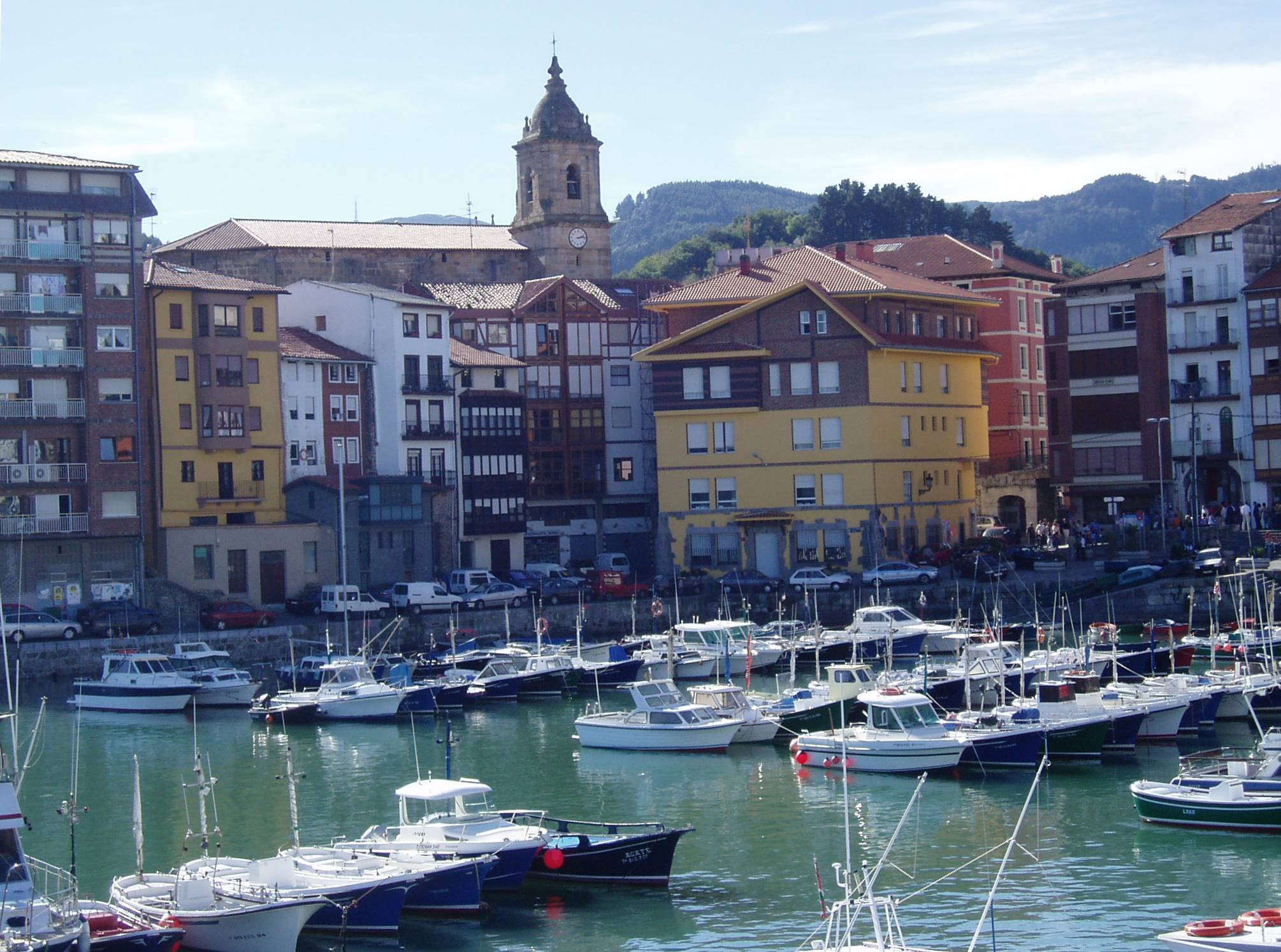
Old port

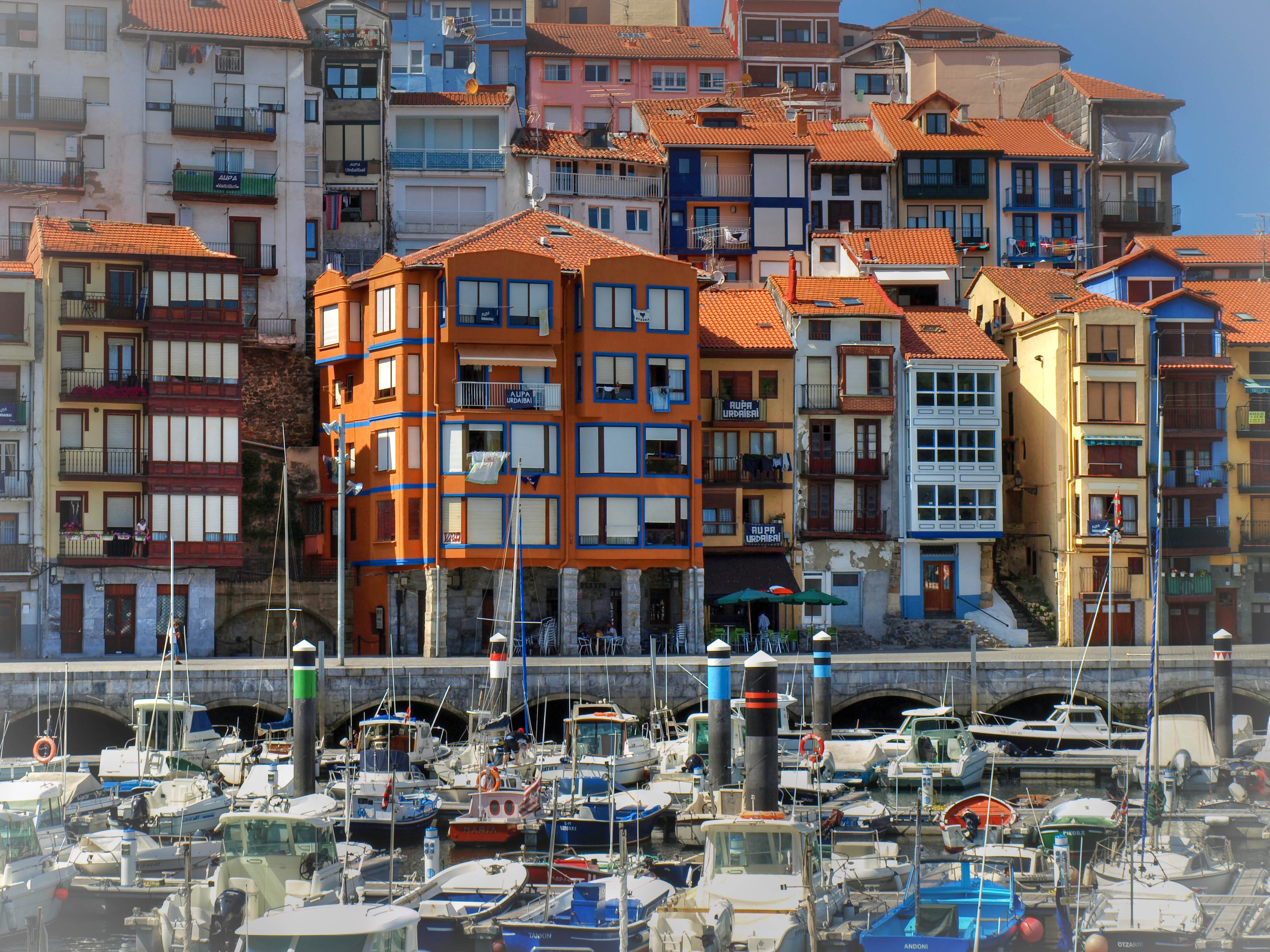
Marina

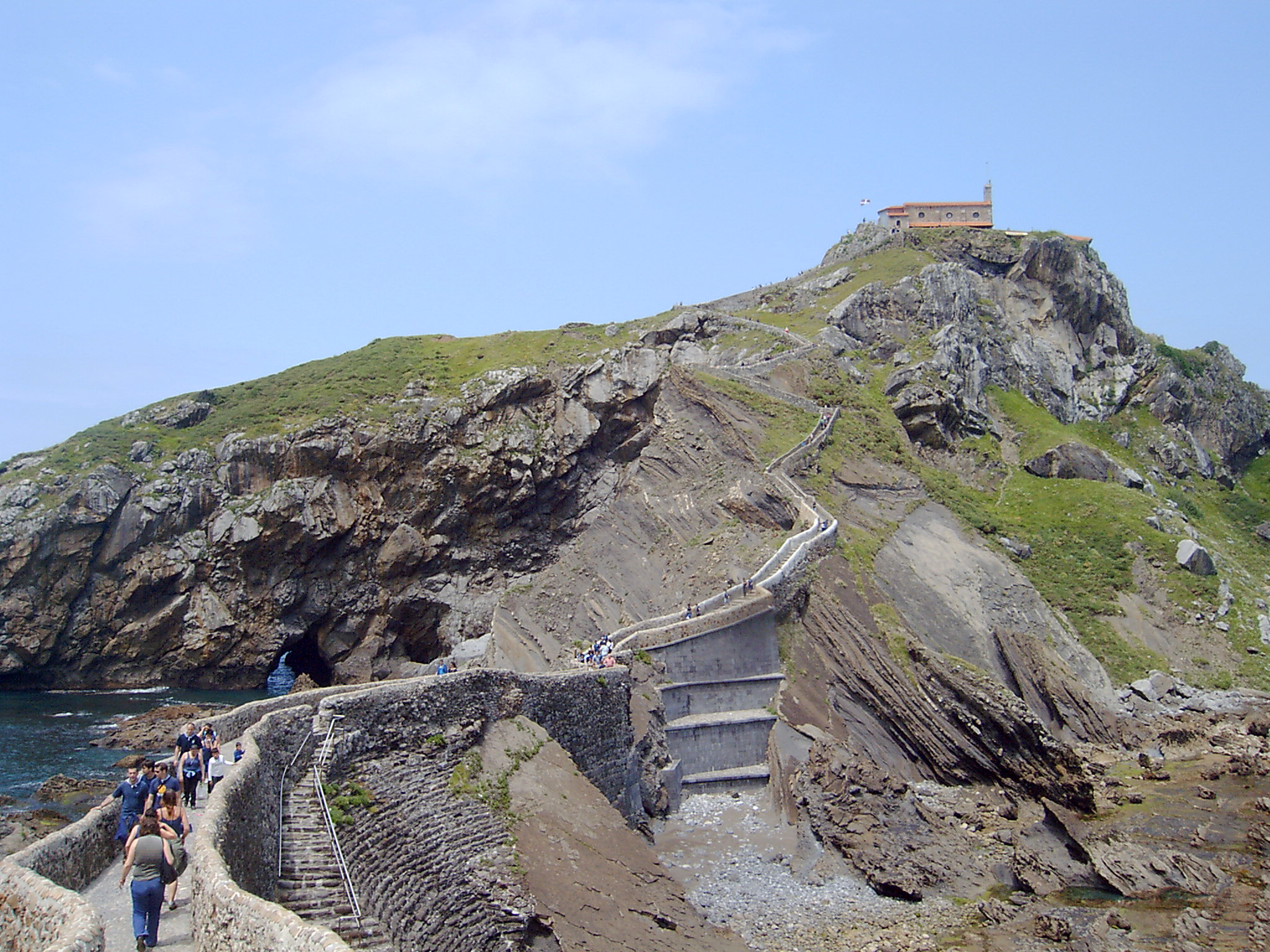
San Juan de Gaztelugatxe

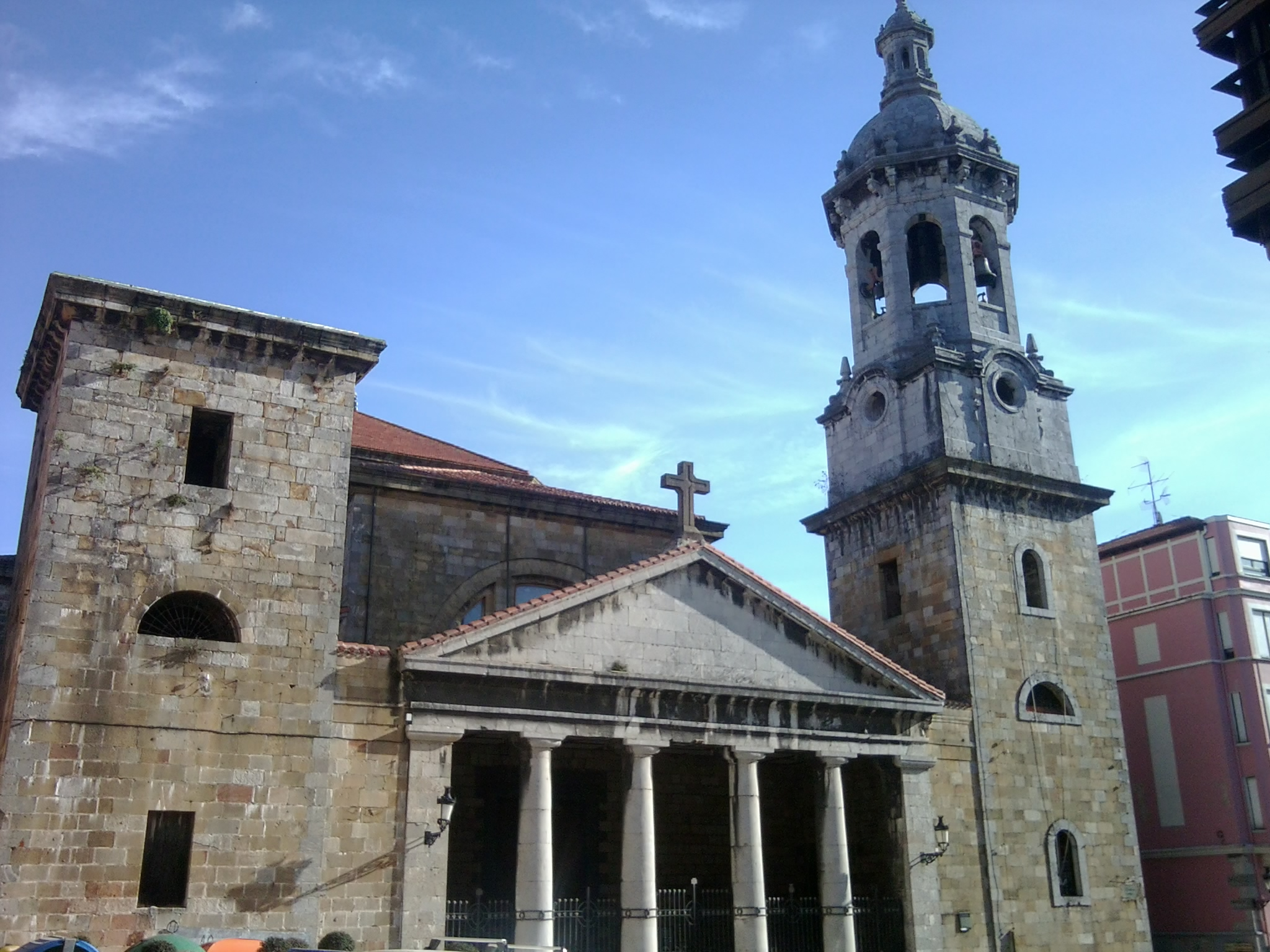
Santa María Church

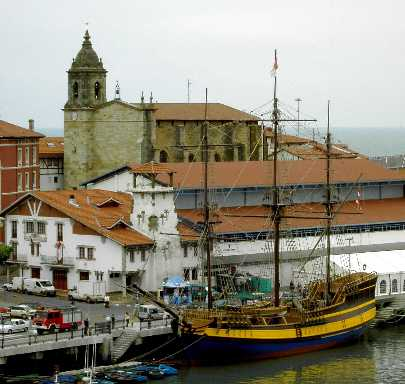
Aita Guria whaleboat

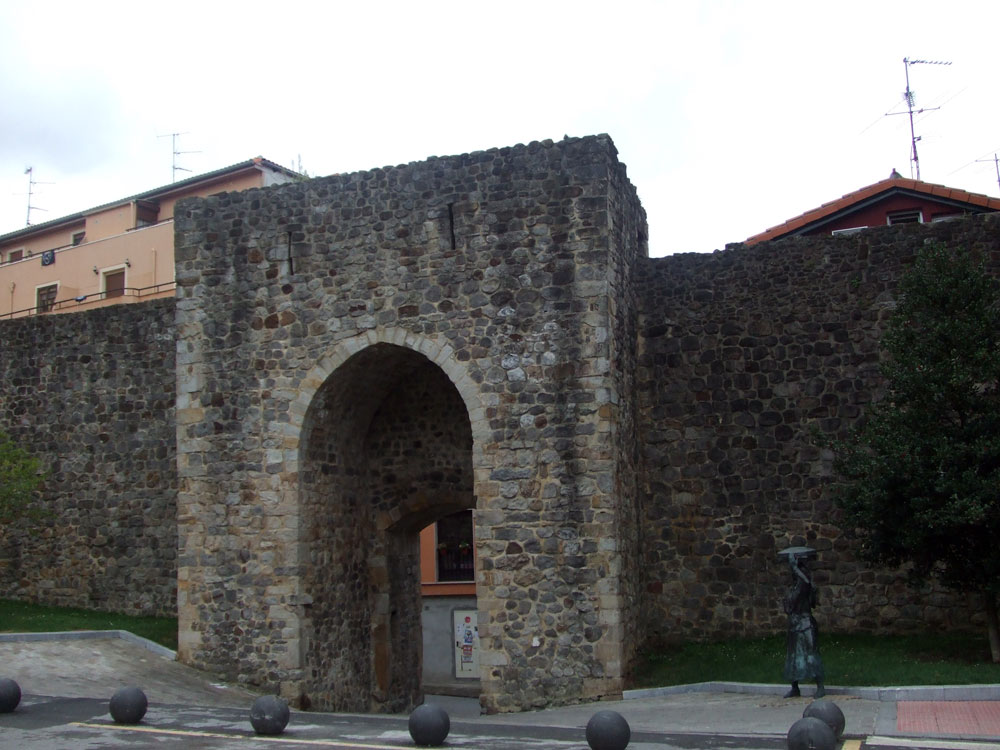
San Juan Gate

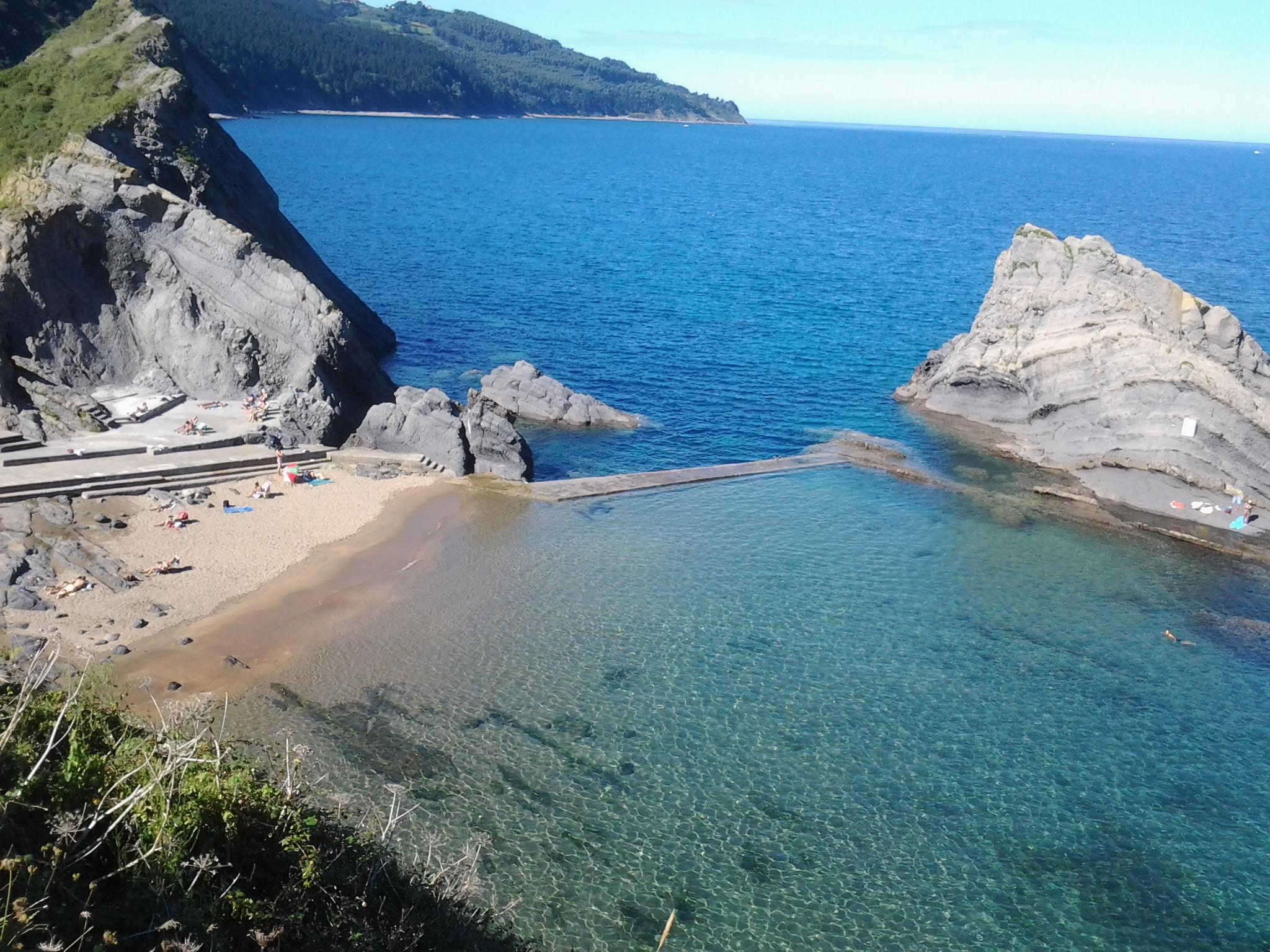
Aritzatxu Beach

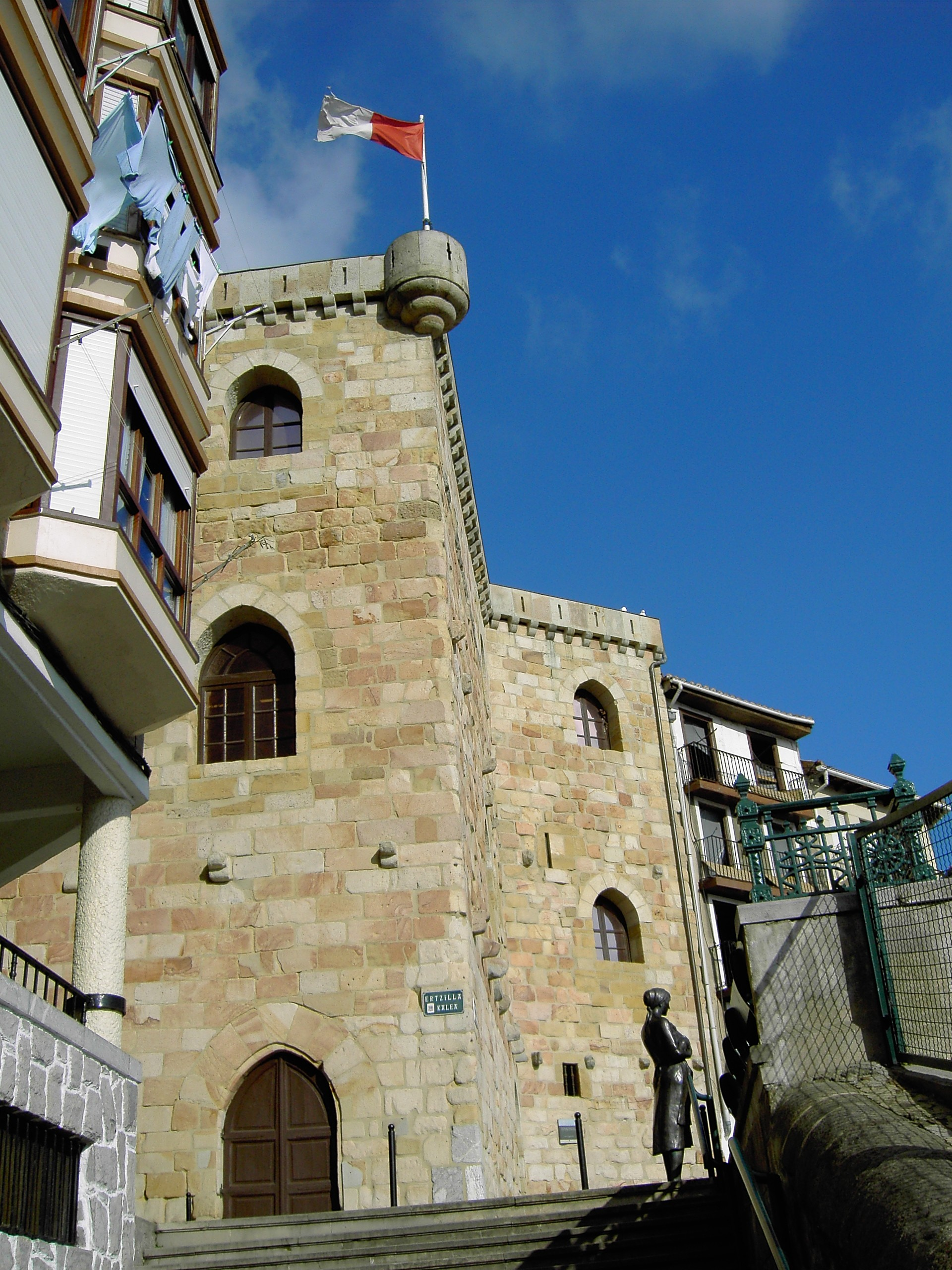
Ercilla Tower

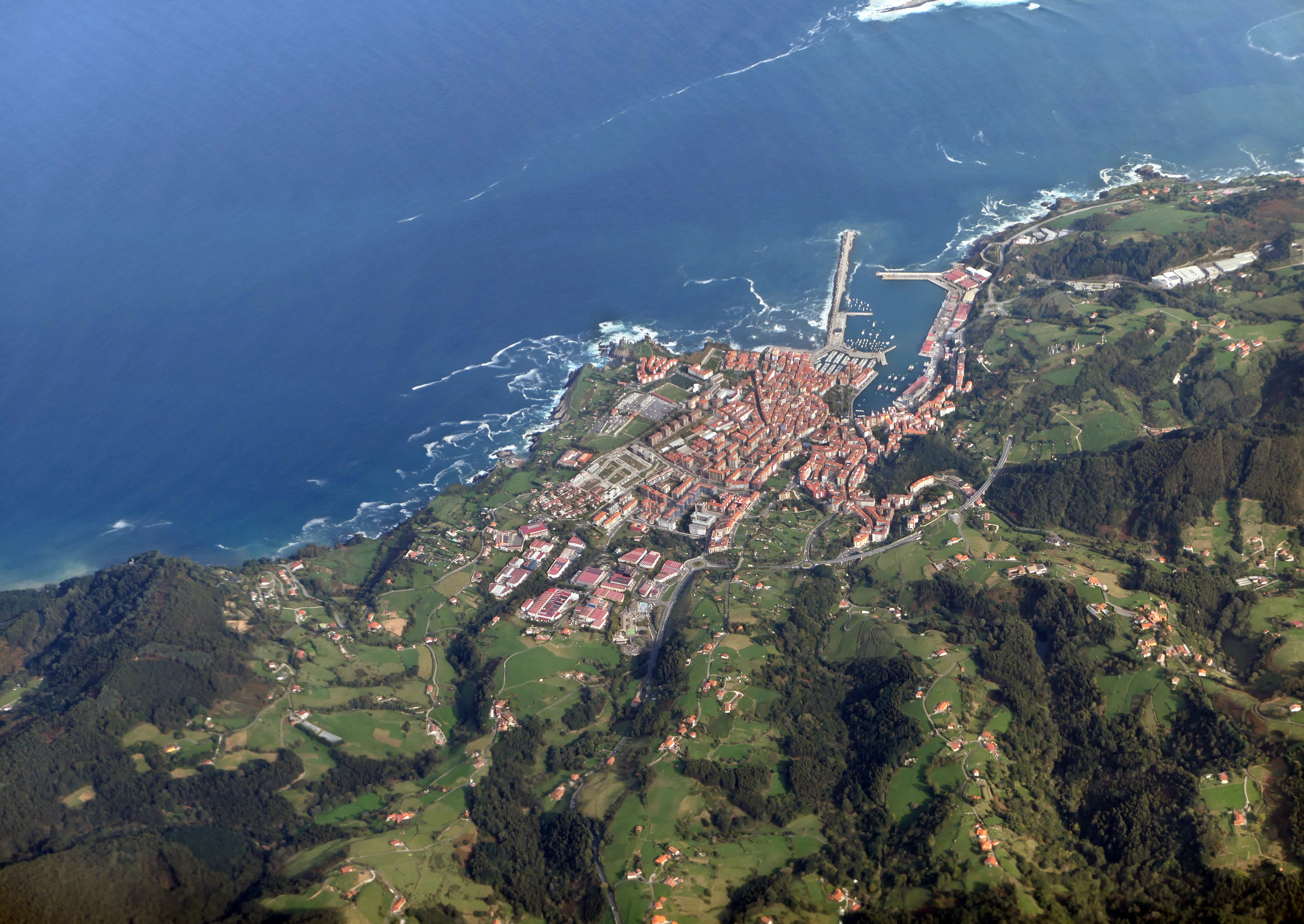
Aerial view

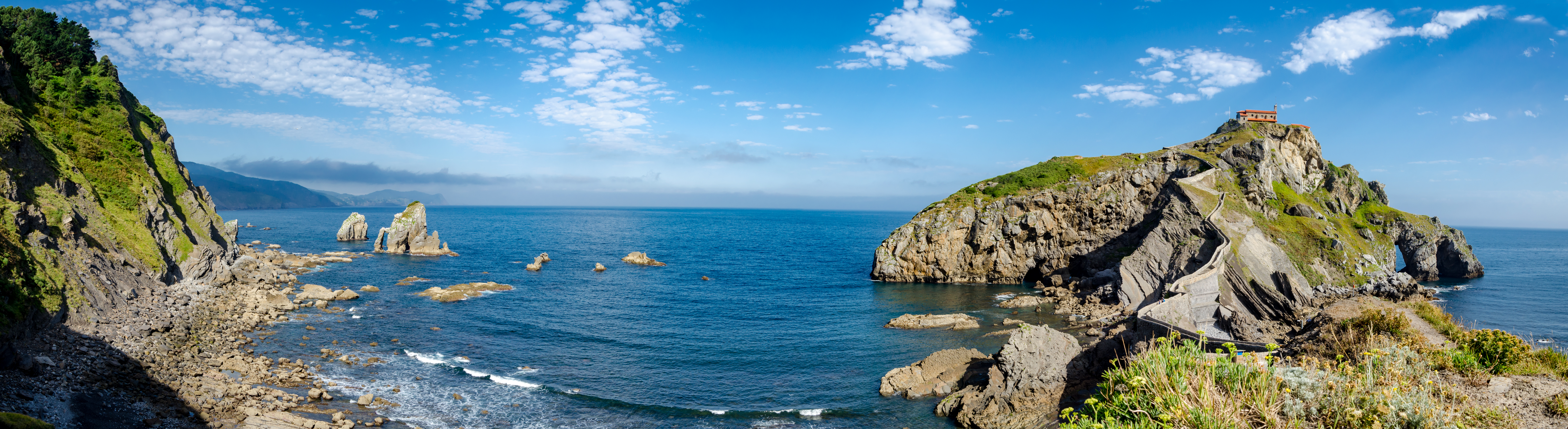
A panoramical view of Gaztelugatxe
