= Lope Díaz I de Haro =

- Coat of arms of the House of Haro
- Born: 1105
- Died: 6 May 1170 (aged 64–65)
- Noble family: Haro
- Spouse: Aldonza Rodríguez
- Father: Diego López I
- Mother: María Sánchez

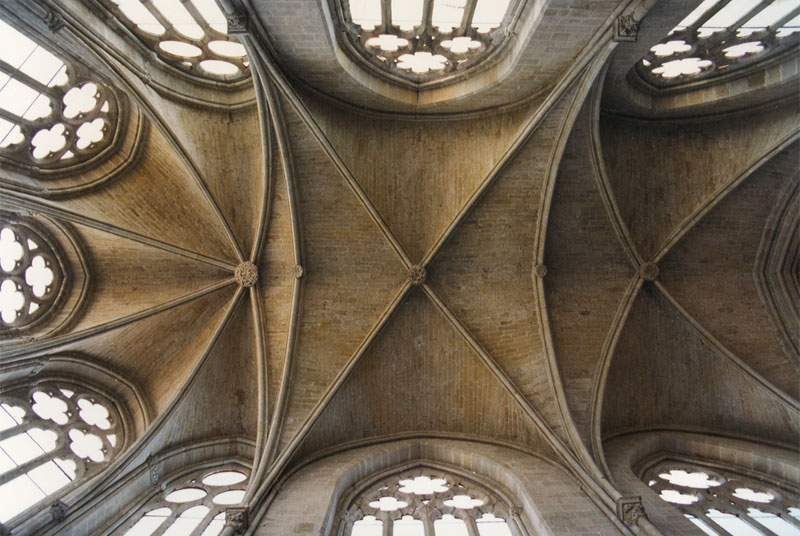
Gothic vaulting from the nave of the monastery Lope founded at Cañas

Lope Díaz I de Haro (c. 1105 – 6 May 1170) was the fourth Lord of Biscay (from at least 1162). He was an important magnate in Castile during the reign of the Emperor Alfonso VII and in the kingdom of his son and grandson. Between 1147 and 1168 he is recorded as governing Old Castile on behalf of the crown.

== Political career ==
Lope was the eldest son of Diego López I and María Sánchez. On his father's death in 1124, Alfonso the Battler seized the Basque señoríos and the Rioja, annexing them to the Kingdom of Navarre. By 17 June 1125 the Battler was in the castle of Haro. Diego was succeeded by the Navarrese magnate Ladrón Íñiguez. Lope was, at the time, probably a youth of about twenty years of age. He is recorded in the Chronica Adefonsi imperatoris (I, §7) among the eleven Castilian noblemen who swore fealty Alfonso VII upon his succession in 1126.

Lope was appointed a count by 1 February 1135. By the next year (1136) he had been given the government of Nájera, which was to be the centre of his power until his death. By 1138 he was holding Álava and by 1140 Haro, the castle from which his father took the family name. In that year, however, he rebelled and was dispossessed. He seems to have been reconciled to the emperor and reinstated by 1143. In 1146 he was with the imperial court in September and again in November. There is no record of Lope's participation in the conquest of Almería (1147), but it is not unlikely.

In 1149 the emperor made Nájera the capital of a subkingdom for his eldest son, Sancho “the Desired”, but by August 1154 Lope had received de facto control of it again, although he had to wait until August 1155 to be formally re-installed as lord of Nájera. At some point Lope entrusted the government of Nájera to a certain vassal of his, Lucas López, whom he had knighted himself. After the death of Alfonso VII, Lope served Sancho as alférez between November 1157 and July 1158, although in December 1157 that post was briefly held by Pedro Fernández. on 29 November 1157 he issued a fuero to the town of Fañuela.

In 1162 Sancho's son and successor, Alfonso VIII, granted Lope the Trasmiera, the Rioja, and Biscay to govern as tenencias. In that year he used the high-sounding title Count of Nájera and Biscay (comes naiarensis atque bizchayensis) for the first time.

== Religious patronage ==
Lope founded two religious houses on his lands. In 1162 he established the Praemonstratensians in San Juan de la Peña. The founding charter was drawn up by a scribe named John, a chaplain of Santa María la Real de Nájera, and the original survives. Lope subscribed the document with his own hand and embellished his signature with a large cross, the rough features of which suggest the count's lack of familiarity with the pen. It leaves open the question of how literate Lope may have been. In 1169 Lope founded a Cistercian convent at Hayuela (Fayola) in the Rioja. In 1170 it was re-founded at nearby Cañas.

In 1168 Lope gave his brother Sancho his property in the monastery of San Cipriano and in Villamezquina.

== Marriage, death and heirs ==
Sometime before 1162 Lope married a lady named Aldonza (Endolza, Endulcia). Her patronymic is not recorded in primary document and her parentage has been much discussed. The earliest authority to name her father was Pedro de Barcelos in the fourteenth century, who called her Aldonza Ruiz de Castro, a daughter of Rodrigo Fernández de Castro and Elo Álvarez, although she is not mentioned among Rodrigo's children in the De rebus Hispaniae. A century later Lope García de Salazar called his wife Mencía, a daughter of Arias. Luis de Salazar y Castro believed that Lope had an earlier wife, name unknown, who bore him several sons, among them Lope López, who married María de Almenar. This thesis is based in part on the assumption that Lope Díaz was not the type to sire children outside of marriage. Most recently José María Canal Sánchez-Pagín has dissented from the view that Aldonza was a Castilian like her husband. She was widowed while her offspring were still young, and they rose to positions of importance in the León and Galicia, where they would have been considered foreigners if their mother was not a Leonese or Galician.

Considering Aldonza's longevity (she outlived her husband by about forty years, and was probably at least thirty years his junior), she must have been born around 1135. Jaime de Salazar y Acha, in his study of the Vela family, suggested that she was a daughter of Rodrigo Vélaz, and Canal Sánchez-Pagín originally suggested that she was his granddaughter, a daughter of Álvaro Rodríguez. In a document of 1182 recording a donation to San Prudencio de Monte Laturce that survives only in a Spanish translation by Gaspar Coronel, Aldonza calls herself a first cousin (consobrina) of Rodrigo Álvarez, son of Álvaro Rodríguez and Sancha Fernández de Traba. It is most likely, then, that she was a daughter of Sancha's brother, Gonzalo Fernández de Traba. She is known to have had close relations with Gonzalo's other children, Gómez and Urraca. She was a daughter of Gonzalo by his first wife, Elvira, a daughter of Rodrigo Vélaz.

Besides his heir, Diego II, Lope Díaz had three sons—García, Lope, and Rodrigo—and eight daughters—Aldonza, Elvira, Estefanía, María, Mencía, Sancha, Toda, and Urraca, whom Ferdinand II of León married as his final wife. Lope died on 6 May 1170, a date confirmed by the Annales compostellani. By June 1171, his widow had entered the convent at Cañas, where for over thirty years she acted as de facto abbess. She was still living in May 1207, when she made a donation to San Marcos de León.

| Preceded by Vela Ladrón | Lord of Biscay; 1162–1170 | Succeeded by Diego López II |

== Bibliography ==
Primary literature

- Glenn Edward Lipskey, ed. and trans. The Chronicle of Alfonso the Emperor: A Translation of the Chronica Adefonsi imperatoris. PhD dissertation, Northwestern University. 1972.
- Ruiz de Loizaga, Saturnino (2000). El libro becerro de Santa María de Bujedo de Candepajares (1168-1240) (in Spanish). Miranda de Ebro: Fundación Cultural Profesor Cantera Burgos. ISBN 84-922354-4-6.

Secondary literature

- Simon Barton. The Aristocracy in Twelfth-century León and Castile. Cambridge: Cambridge University Press, 1997.
- Ghislain Baury. "Diego López 'le bon' et Diego López 'le mauvais': comment s'est construite la mémoire d'un magnat du règne d'Alphonse VIII de Castille." Berceo, 144(2003), 37–92.
- Ghislain Baury. "Los ricoshombres y el rey en Castilla: El linaje Haro, 1076–1322." Territorio, Sociedad y Poder: Revista de Estudios Medievales, 6(2011), 53–72.
- José María Canal Sánchez-Pagín. "La Casa de Haro en León y Castilla durante el siglo XII: Nuevas conclusiones." Anuario de estudios medievales, 25(1995):1, 3–38, cf. esp. pp. 10–19 for Lope Díaz I.
- Ángel J. Martín Duque. "Vasconia en la Alta Edad Media: Somera aproximación histórica." Príncipe de Viana, 63(2002):227, 871–908.
- Gregorio Monreal Zia. "El Señorío de Vizcaya: origen, naturaleza jurídica, estructura institucional." Anuario de historia del derecho español, 43(1973), 113–206.
- Luis Salazar y Castro. Historia genealógica de la Casa de Haro. Madrid: Dalmiro de la Válgoma y Díaz-Varela, Madrid, 1959.
