= Diego López I de Haro =

3rd Lord of Biscay and ruler of Álava

- Coat of arms of the House of Haro
- Died: 1124
- Noble family: Haro
- Spouse: María Sánchez
- Father: Lope Íñiguez
- Mother: Ticlo (Tecla) Díaz

Diego López I de Haro (died 1124×6) was the third Lord of Biscay, and also the ruler of Álava, Buradón, Grañón, Nájera, Haro, and perhaps Guipúzcoa: the most powerful Castilian magnate in the Basque Country and the Rioja during the first quarter of the twelfth century. He was a loyal supporter of Queen Urraca and he fought the invading armies of her estranged husband Alfonso the Battler on two, or perhaps three, occasions.

Diego succeeded his father, Lope Íñiguez, in Biscay (and perhaps Guipúzcoa) on the latter's death in 1093, but Álava went to his brother-in-law Lope González. On the death of García Ordóñez at the Battle of Uclés (1108), the tenencias of Grañón, Nájera and Haro passed to Diego by an act of Alfonso VI. In June 1110 Diego received a grant of privileges from Queen Urraca, acting without the consent of Alfonso the Battler, whereby she gave all his patrimonial lands (that is, lands he owned, not fiscal lands he governed on behalf of the crown) complete immunity from confiscation. In August Urraca, then advancing with her army on Zaragoza, confirmed some rights and privileges of the monastery of San Millán de la Cogolla, an act confirmed by the three most important magnates of the region: Sancho, Count of Pamplona, Diego, described as senior in Nagera, and Íñigo Jiménez de los Cameros, dominante in Calahorra. At that time Íñigo Jiménez was also ruling Buradón. After Lope González's death in 1110 and before 1113 Diego succeeded to Álava and re-united all his father's tenencias. It was Diego who first began using the toponymic surname "de Haro", which became the family name.

It is possible that Diego, alongside the Navarrese count Ladrón Íñiguez, first went to war against Alfonso in 1112, and that there was fighting in the vicinity of Castrojeriz that July. Alfonso made reference to Diego and the fighting in a charter to Santo Domingo de la Calzada, but this charter is dated differently in each of its surviving copies. One copy dates it to July 1124, which fits with Diego's last known rebellion. In August 1116 Diego raised the standard of revolt against Alfonso, whose Navarrese lands his lordships bordered. He was consequently deprived of Nájera, which was bestowed on Fortunio Garcés Caixal, although he may never had actually given it up. He was allowed to retain Haro and Buradón, which he had received some time after 1110. In February 1117 Alfonso made a donation to Santa María la Real de Nájera calling himself Imperator and still claiming the kingdoms of Urraca. The donation was confirmed by Diego López, along with Pedro González de Lara and Suero Vermúdez, several bishops and many Aragonese. The charter is in the style of the Leonese chancery and its authenticity has been called into question, but it may reflect a moment of heightened negotiations between Alfonso and Urraca. It cannot be taken to reflect a desertion on the part of her major supporters (Diego, Pedro and Suero). Diego remained on good terms with Alfonso in 1118, when he participated in the Reconquista of the great city of Zaragoza, and into 1119, taking part in the continuing conquest of the taifa. In July 1124, perhaps encouraged by Urraca or her son, Alfonso VII, Diego again aided by Ladrón of Navarre rose against Alfonso's forces and was besieged in Haro by Alfonso himself. Alfonso confiscated all his tenencias and granted them to Íñigo Vélaz. There is some discrepancy over when and how Diego died. According to some source, he died in 1124, probably in the fighting, while others place his death in 1126, after having lost all his lands and titles.

Diego married a certain María Sánchez of obscure origins. In 1121 he and his wife joined his sister, Toda López, and her daughter, his niece, María López, in making a donation to Santa María la Real. María Sánchez has been called a sister of García Ordóñez, an impossibility in light of her patronymic; a daughter of Sancho Núñez, son of count Munio Sánchez, ruler of the Duranguesado; and a sister of Lope García Sánchez of the Llodio branch of the Ayala clan. More likely than any of these hypotheses is that she was a daughter of Sancho Sánchez de Erro, ruler of Tafalla in Navarre, and his wife, Elvira García, daughter of García Ordóñez. Diego's claim to García's lordships in 1108 may have stemmed partially from his wife's ancestry. She gave four sons: Lope Díaz I, who later ruled Biscay and Álava, and three obscure names, Sancho, Fortunio and Gil. Some historians have reckoned Sancha Díaz de Frias, the founder of Santa María de Bujedo, his daughter, but she was more probably a daughter of Diego Sánchez de Ayala and a sister of Toda Díaz. In May 1140, widowed, María "the mother of Count Lope" (mater comitis Lupi) and Mayor Garcés gave the monastery of San Ginés to that of San Juan de Burgos.

Preceded by Lope Íñiguez	Lord of Biscay; 1093–1124	Succeeded by Íñigo Vélaz
