= County of Durango =

County of Durango Durangoko Merinaldea Merindad de Durango
- c. 1050–1212
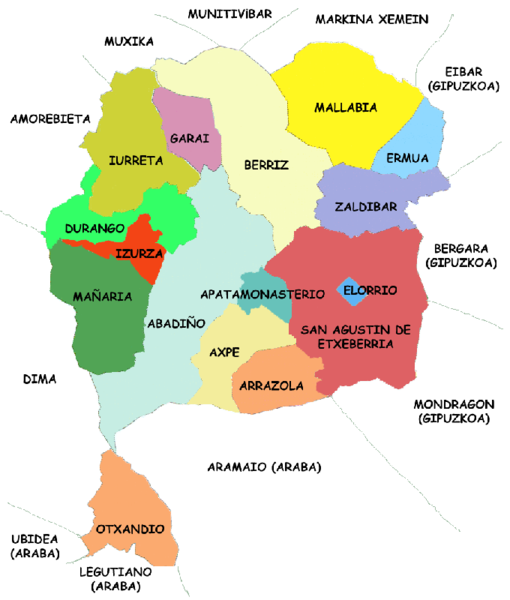
- Elizates and town that composed the County of Durango
- Status: Part of the Kingdom of Pamplona, then incorporated into the Lordship of Biscay
- Capital: Durango
- Government: County
- Historical era: Middle Ages
  - Established: c. 1050
  - Annexation to the Lordship of Biscay: 1212
Preceded by	Succeeded by
Kingdom of Pamplona	Lordship of Biscay

The County of Durango (Basque: Durangoko Merinaldea), also known as Land of Durango and Merindad of Durango, was the ancient political administration of the territory that is now known as Durangaldea, in the Basque region of Biscay. This political administration included all the towns and elizates that existed within its territory. The elizates were all governed by the Foral law, while the towns had their own law. The county of Durango was a vassal state of the Kingdom of Pamplona (later, Navarre), and in the 13th century it became a constituent part of the Lordship of Biscay. It has been part of the territory of Biscay since then. Its capital city was the town of Durango.

== History ==
The first known reference of the existence of a political organization in the territory of Durango was in the year 1050, when Eneco Lupiz is appointed regent of "the territories of Biscay and Durango". It appears again in the record of a committee that took place in the church of San Agustin-Etxebarria in the year 1053, this time with the name Duranko. The County of Durango is also mentioned along the County of Álava in relation to its close relationship with the Kingdom of Navarre. During the 11th century the lands of Durango, along with the Lordship of Biscay, moved back and forward between the kingdoms of Castile and Navarre, that kept losing and reconquering the land. In the year 1200, Alfonso VIII of Castile invades the county of Alava and lays siege to the city of Vitoria. Alava and Durango are then ultimately conquered by Castile. In the year 1212, Castilian king Alfonso VIII merges the County of Durango into the Lordship of Biscay, which is awarded to Diego López II de Haro for his war efforts in the Battle of Las Navas de Tolosa. However, Durango maintained its economical and political autonomy, despite being now part of the Lordship.

== Territory ==
The County of Durango was formed by twelve elizates and four towns or cities that occupy the same territory that today does Durangaldea, a region of the province of Biscay and successor of this county. The elizates were Abadiño, Berriz, Mallabia, Mañaria, Iurreta, Garai, Zaldibar, Arrazola, Axpe, Apatamonasterio, Izurtza and San Agustin-Etxebarria, while the four towns were Durango (also the capital), Elorrio, Ermua and Otxandio.

In 1630 Elorrio annexed the elizate of San Augstin-Etxebarria, and in present time the elizates of Axpe, Arrazola and Apatamonasterio are joined together forming the municipality of Atxondo.

== Political institutions ==
=== Audience House ===
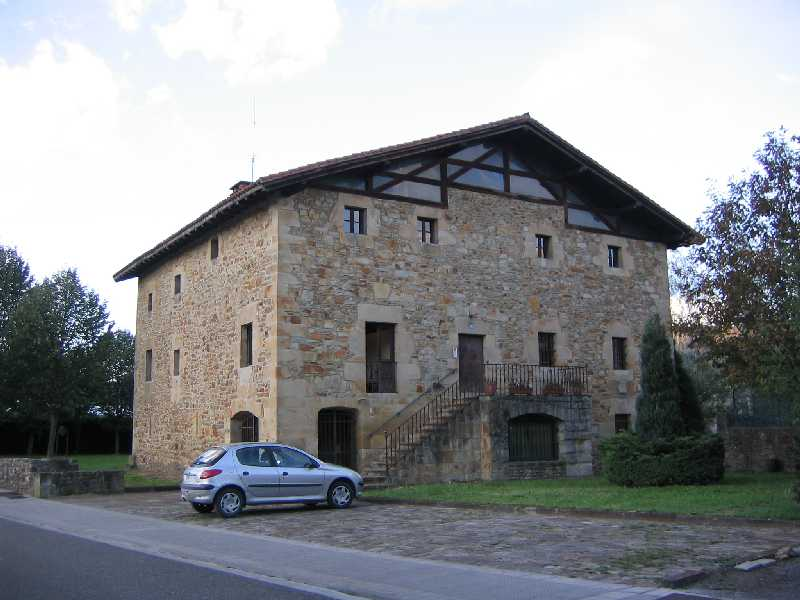
House of Astola in Astola, Abadiño.

The ordinary meetings between the representatives of the elizates and towns took place in the called the Audience House. The first documented Audience House was located in the neighborhood of Kurutzesaga in Durango, which was known as "the Old Audience" and it is known that there were issues about its ownership between the county and the administration of the town of Durango.

In 1578, long after the incorporation of the county into the Lordship of Biscay, the House of Astola is acquired and the meetings start taking place there. This house dates the year 1570 and takes place of a previous one, destroyed in a fire. In the House of Astola lived some of the authorities of the county and was also the location of the county's prison.

=== The Foral Field ===
The extraordinary meetings between the representatives of the county were held in a field between the hermitages of San Salvador and San Clemente in the neighborhood of Gerediaga, Abadiño, under an oak and seated on stones positioned on a semicircle. The building still stands on its original location and has been recently reformed by the Government of Biscay. The oak was lost around the 18th century.

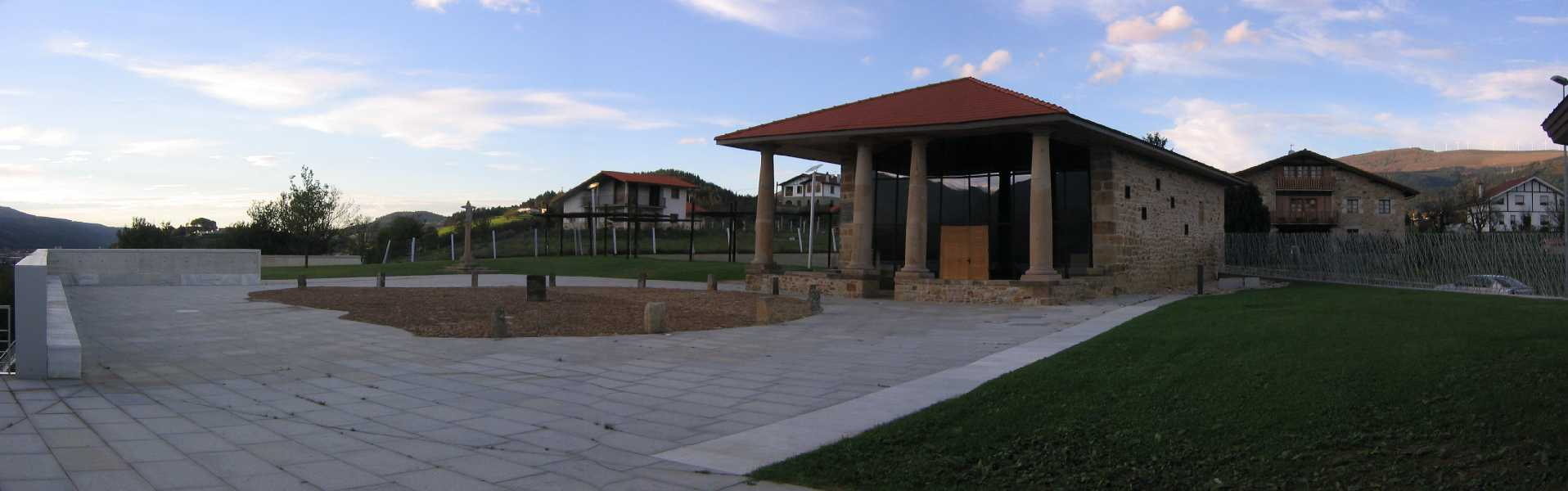
The Foral Field of Gerediaga in 2005.

== See also ==
- Lordship of Biscay
- Durango, Biscay
- Durangaldea
