= Ladrón =

Ladrón is a Spanish-language name meaning “thief”. Notable people with the name include:

- Rafael Ladrón (born 1952), Spanish cyclist
- Vela Ladrón (died 1174), Spanish nobleman
- Ladrón Íñiguez (died 1155), nobleman of the Kingdom of Navarre

== Music ==
- “Ladrón” (song), a song by Lali and Cazzu released in 2020

== See also ==
- Ladrón de Guevara (surname)
- Ladrones (disambiguation)
