= Lope Díaz II de Haro =

Spanish noble

- Coat of arms of the House of Haro
- Born: 1170
- Died: 15 November 1236 (aged 65–66)
- Noble family: Haro
- Spouse: Urraca Alfonso de León
- Issue Detail: Diego López III de Haro
- Father: Diego López II de Haro
- Mother: María Manrique

Lope Díaz II de Haro "Cabeza Brava" (b. 1170 – d. 15 November 1236) was a Spanish noble of the House of Haro, the sixth Lord of Biscay, and founder of the municipality of Plentzia. He was the eldest son of Diego López II de Haro and his wife, María Manrique. Lope was also a member of the Order of Santiago.

== Biography ==
Lope Díaz fought alongside his father at the Battle of Las Navas de Tolosa where he distinguished himself. That action expelled the Almohads from the region and brought it under Castilian rule. The battle was commanded by three Christian kings; Alfonso VIII of Castile, Peter II of Aragon and Sancho VII of Navarre.

Lope Díaz came to power in difficult times after the death of his father on 16 October 1214. A few days after he came to power, King Alfonso VIII of Castile died, leaving his 10-year-old son, the ill-fated Henry I of Castile, as heir to the throne after mysterious the death of his older brother, Fernando de Castilla y Plantagenet. The House of Lara gained power over Henry and started a rivalry with his sister, Berengaria of Castile, who consequently was Lope Díaz' patron. In 1217, Henry was 'accidentally' killed at the age of 13 by a falling roof tile. He was succeeded by his sister Berengaria, with the support of Lope Díaz, amongst other nobles, who later abdicated in favor of her son Ferdinand III of Castile, crowned in Nájera. Alfonso IX of León, the father of Ferdinand III was against the coronation of his son and invaded Castile with the support of the House of Lara. During this invasion, Álvaro Núñez de Lara gained power in Nájera and was subsequently defeated and imprisoned by Lope Díaz.

For his supporting role in the backing of Ferdinand III as king, Lope Díaz was granted the title of "Alférez del Rey", or lieutenant of the king. He was married to the daughter of King Alfonso IX and step-sister of Ferdinand III, Urraca Alfonso de León. He was also given titles over the villages of Haro and Pedroso. Lope participated in various other wars supporting the ascension of Ferdinand III such as the expeditions against the Moors in Andalucía, of which the most important was the capture of Baeza in 1227. For his role in the city's capture, Lope Díaz was given the title of Conquistador de Baeza.

In the early 1230s, the bishop of Calahorra wanted to exert his power over all the churches subject to the Monasteries of San Millán de la Cogolla. This led to multiple lawsuits that would end in 1232 with the move of the Diocese of Calahorra y La Calzada-Logroño to Santo Domingo de la Calzada. By 1235, the fallout from this shakeup was so great that Lope was forced to expel the bishop who fled to Rome and the diocese moved back to Calahorra.

In 1234, fresh conflict broke out between King Ferdinand III and two of his leading magnates, Álvaro Pérez de Castro el Castellano: head of the House of Castro, and Lope Díaz II de Haro. Lope's grievances with the king were a result of a disagreement between the two at the siege of Úbeda. Without the approval of the king, who was uncle of Lope's daughters as his sister was Lope's wife, Alvaro Perez de Castro married Lope's daughter Mencia Lopez de Haro. This led king Ferdinand to relinquish all the titles and lands granted to Álvaro Pérez de Castro by the crown even though the conflict was settled arbitrarily by the Queens Berengaria de Castilla and Elisabeth of Swabia.

== Death ==
Lope Díaz de Haro II died shortly after on 15 November 1236. He was buried in a sepulcher at the monastery of Santa María la Real de Nájera

== Marriage and Descendants ==
Lope Díaz married Urraca Alfonso de León, the illegitimate daughter of Alfonso IX of León and his lover, Inés Íñiguez de Mendoza. With this wife, he had the following children:

- Diego López III de Haro - succeeded his father as the Lord of Biscay.
- Teresa López de Haro - Married Nuño Sánchez, son of Sancho I de Cerdaña and Sancha Núñez de Lara. She later married a second time with Rodrigo González Girón, son of Gonzalo Rodríguez Girón.
- Álvaro López de Haro - Married Berenguela González de Girón, with whom he had five children. Died after 1236.
- Mencía López de Haro - First married Álvaro Pérez de Castro el Castellano, head of the House of Castro and son of Pedro Fernández de Castro "el Castellano". She later married a second time with King Sancho II of Portugal and became queen consort of Portugal. She died without having any children and was buried with Lope at the monastery of Santa María la Real de Nájera.
- Berenguela López de Haro - Named after the Queen of Castile, she married before 1254 with Rodrigo González Girón, son of Gonzalo Rodríguez Girón, without succession. Her last will and testament was granted on 17 August 1296.
- Sancho López de Haro - The second son of Lope who went on to found the House of Ayala which rose to power in the 13th Century.
- Lope López de Haro el Chico (b. 1220 – d. ?) - Señorío de La Guardia of Jaén and Bailén. Married Mayor González de Girón.
- Alfonso López de Haro - Became Lord of Cameros through his marriage with his first wife María Álvarez, daughter of Álvar Díaz de los Cameros and Mencía Díaz de Haro. Together they founded the Monasterio de Santa María de Herce in 1246. He later married a second time with Sancha Gil, daughter of Gil Vasques de Soverosa and María González Girón, the latter being the widow of Guillén Pérez de Guzmán.
- Manrique López de Haro - Died after 1236.

With Toda de Salcedo de Santa Gadea he had one son:

- Diego López de Salcedo - Merino Mayor of Castilla and Adelantado of Álava and Guipúzcoa, who is present in the documentation of various monasteries and who in 1275 was present in the last will and testament of his half sister, the queen Mencía López de Haro. He was buried in the same chapel as her and Lope Diaz at the Monasterio de Santa María la Real de Nájera. He married Teresa Álvarez de Lara, illegitimate daughter of Alvar Fernández de Lara.

He had another son with an unknown mother:

- Lope Díaz de Haro - Bishop of Sigüenza (1269-1271) and chaplain at the Monasterio de Santa María la Real de Nájera along with his brother, Diego López de Salcedo.

== See also ==
- Lord of Biscay
- House of Haro
- Alfonso VIII of Castile
- Ferdinand III of Castile

== Bibliography ==
- Ansón Oliart, Francisco (1998). Fernando III, rey de Castilla y León. Madrid: Ediciones Palabra S. A. ISBN 84-8239-233-6.
- Arco y Garay, Ricardo del (1954). Instituto Jerónimo Zurita. Consejo Superior de Investigaciones Científicas (ed.). Sepulcros de la Casa Real de Castilla. OCLC 11366237.
- Barón Faraldo, Andrés (2006). Grupos y dominios aristocráticos en la Tierra de Campos oriental, Siglos X-XIII (in Spanish). Palencia: Monografías. ISBN 84-8173-122-6.
- Eslava Galán, Juan (1987). "La campaña de 1225 y el primer cerco de Jaén por Fernando III". Boletín del Instituto de Estudios Giennenses. No. 132. Jaén: Instituto de Estudios Giennenses. pp. 23–38. ISSN 0561-3590.
- González González, Julio (2006). Consejo Superior de Investigaciones Científicas. Instituto Jerónimo Zurita (ed.). Las conquistas de Fernando III en Andalucía (Facsímil ed.). Valladolid: Editorial Maxtor. ISBN 84-9761-277-9.
- Salazar y Acha, Jaime de (1989). "Los descendientes del conde Ero Fernández, fundador de Monasterio de Santa María de Ferreira de Pallares". El Museo de Pontevedra. No. 43. pp. 67–86. ISSN 0210-7791.

Preceded by Diego López II de Haro	Lord of Biscay; 1214–1236	Succeeded by Diego López III de Haro
