= Vela Ladrón =

Spanish nobleman (died 1174)

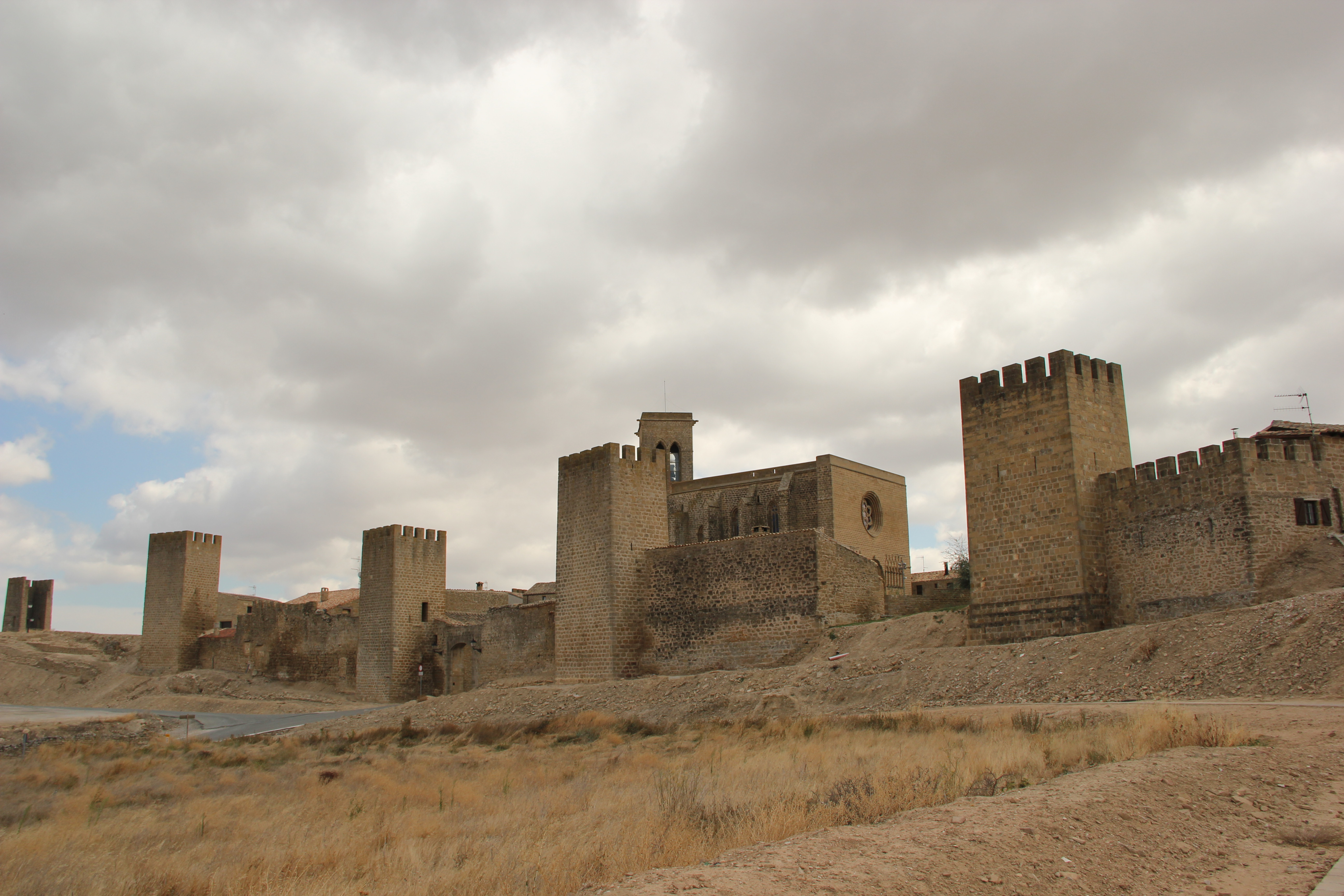
The walls of Artajona, originally constructed in the 11th and 12th centuries. Artajona was commanded for a time by Vela on behalf of the king of Navarre.

Vela Ladrón or Latrónez (died 1174) was a Spanish nobleman who ruled the Basque counties of Álava, Biscay (Vizcaya) and Guipúzcoa. He succeeded his father as count of Álava in 1155 or 1156. He acquired Biscay around 1160 and Guipúzcoa around 1162. He was effectively an independent prince able to divide his allegiance between the kings of Castile and Navarre.

== Son of Ladrón (c.1136–1155) ==
The Vela family was descended from Vela Ladrón's namesake, Vela Aznárez, a Navarrese nobleman of Guipúzcoa from the reign of Sancho IV (1054–76). A local dynasty, members of the family ruled Álava continuously from 1131 until 1179. Vela Ladrón was the eldest son of Count Ladrón Íñiguez, who ruled the same Basque counties with the same divided allegiance. (Vela's surname, Ladrón or Latrónez, merely indicates his father's name.) Vela had two sons: Juan Vélaz, who succeeded him in Álava, and Pedro Vélaz. Pedro held the tenancies of Malvecín in 1174, Arlucea in 1189–94 and Aizorroz in 1194. His son, Ladrón Pérez, held the castle of Javier in 1217.

Like his father, Vela was a lay brother of the Order of the Temple. (Note: confrater Militum Templi) According to a list of lay brothers compiled in the twelfth century, he pledged to donate to the order one morabetino annually on Michaelmas and to supply it with one horse with a knight's equipment upon his death. (Note: Beila, filius Latronis, debet dare unum morabitinum ad Sanctum Michaelem et ad mortem equum cum armis) His son Pedro also associated himself with the order as a lay brother.

When war broke out between Emperor Alfonso VII of León and Castile and King García Ramírez of Navarre in 1136, Count Ladrón's land were plundered and the count was captured by Alfonso's forces. On 14 September, Ladrón did homage to Alfonso for the county of Álava, transferring his allegiance from Navarre to Castile. Guipúzcoa and Biscay, however, probably remained outside of Castilian control. It is likely that the lands were administered by Vela during Ladrón's captivity, since the count's son was already an adult by then. In 1137, Vela succeeded his father in the tenancy of Aibar in central Navarre. He was still holding it as late as 1147, but by 1150 "count Ladrón was ruling [again] in Aibar and lord Vela in Leguín." (Note: 1137: Don Beilla in Aibar; 1139: Veila Latron in Aiuar; 1141: Don Beila in Aiuar; 1147: Don Beila in Aiuar; 1150: comite Latrone dominante in Aybar et don Veila in Leguin) There is a false document dated to 1149, which records how Vela came to possess a mayorazgo in Oñate: "I, Count Ladrón, by the grace of God, prince of the Navarrese, give to you my son, Vela Ladrón, all my inheritance that is in Oñate." (Note: Yo el conde don Ladron por la graçia de Dios, Prinçipe de los Navarros do a ti mi hijo Vela Ladron toda mi heredad que e en Oñate)

On 21 November 1150, García Ramírez died and was succeeded by his seventeen-year-old son Sancho VI. Although Sancho soon renewed the homage his father had owed Alfonso VII, on 27 January 1151 the emperor of León and Castile concluded a secret treaty at Tudején with Prince Ramon Berenguer IV, regent of the kingdom of Aragon, by which they agreed to divide the Navarre between them. The implementation of this treaty hinged on Sancho VI's ability to command the loyalty of the Navarrese: Alfonso had no intention of destabilising Navarre if it proved a loyal vassal of León–Castile. The young king Sancho spent the six weeks following his act of homage (and the secret treaty) with the emperor's court in northeastern Castile. Present with the two rulers throughout this six weeks were their border magnates, Rodrigo Pérez de Azagra from Navarre and Ladrón Íñiguez and Vela Ladrón from Castile.

== Castilian count (1155–c.1162) ==
Ladrón last appears in the record on 23 July 1155 and probably died shortly thereafter. By July 1156 he had been succeeded by Vela. Vela subscribed a Castilian document dated 18 September 1155, without the title "count". By the next year he had been raised to the comital dignity his father had held. In the last two years of Alfonso VII's reign, 1156 and 1157, Vela signed fourteen imperial diplomas as a count. Although the comital title was granted by the crown and is strongly associated with those who attended court regularly, it was, as in the case of Vela, sometimes treated as a semi-hereditary dignity and could be attached to any tenancy held by a count. Vela was not a regular attendee at Alfonso's court. He attended only when his interests dictated it or when the king's was in the vicinity of Álava, yet his comital title was always recognised. Five charters of Alfonso VII call Vela "count of Navarre", (Note: comes Vela de Navarra) although he was not governing the old county of Navarre created in 1087. In one of these charters, Sancho VI also signs, implicitly recognising Vela's vaunted title.

Although Vela was unswerving in his loyalty to Castile during the reign of Alfonso VII, he did hold tenancies in Navarre, perhaps ones once held by his father. Two private documents of 1156 record Vela as "ruling" (Note: dominans, i.e., governing, lording) over the tenancies of Murillo, southeast of Pamplona in Navarre; Resa, near Calahorra in Castile;and Grañón (Note: comes Velas tenens Grainum, i.e., count Vela holding Grañón) in the Rioja (part of Castile). Another private document of 10 February 1156 cites him as tenant in Artajona (in Navarre) and one of 26 July 1157 as tenant in Salinas de Añana (in Álava). At Murillo, Vela employed an alcaide named Pedro Jiménez de Góngora. (Note: comes don Beila dominans in Murello et in Resa. Alcaiat in Murello Petro Xemenez de Gongora)

Vela continued to serve Alfonso's successor as king of Castile, his eldest son, Sancho III. The very last document to emanate from the court of Sancho III, dated 30 July 1158, was witnessed by "Count Vela of Álava". (Note: comes Vela de Alava) Yet, prior to Alfonso's death, Vela never witnessed a charter of the king of Navarre, implying that he never attended the Navarrese court except when, as a vassal of Castile, it was in attendance there. In 1157, however, Vela witnessed a diploma of Sancho VI. After Sancho III's death in 1158, Vela initially recognised his successor, the child-king Alfonso VIII, but he also continued to visit the Navarrese court, where, from about 1160, he was recognised as count not only in Álava, but also in Biscay (Note: comes Veila in Alava et in Bizcaia) and, from about 1162, in Guipúzcoa. (Note: [comes Vela] in Ypuçchoa) Evidence that Lope Díaz, of the Biscayne house of Haro, was lord of Biscay in 1162 suggests that perhaps the lordship was divided, with Vela only controlling the Duranguesado with Lope still holding his ancestral lordship in central Biscay. His rule of Álava, was complete. One record from 1161 even specifies that he was count "in all Álava,". (Note: in tota Alava)

== Navarrese count (c.1162–1174) ==
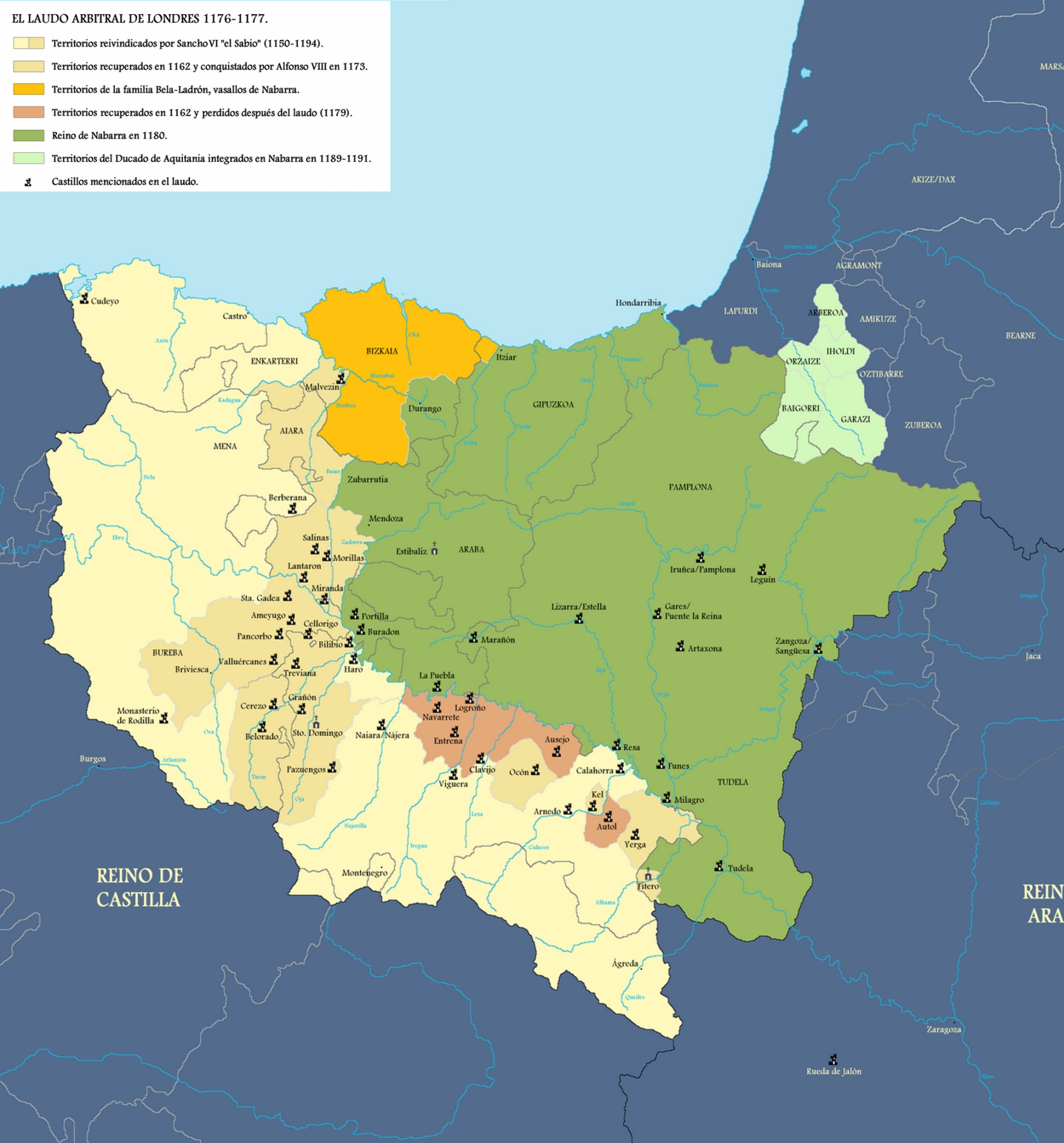
Territorial changes between Navarre and Castile under Sancho VI and Alfonso VIII

In 1160, Vela was a witness to the concession granted by Sancho VI to the Knights Templar. On 7 July 1160, 11 March 1162, 29 November 1164 and finally 22 February 1166, he made appearances at the Castilian court, where the regency was being exercised by Count Manrique Pérez de Lara, who also had the guardianship of the young king from March 1161. During these years there was intermittent civil war in Castile between the Laras and the Castros over the regency of the kingdom and the guardianship of the king, responsibilities which prior to 1161 had been divided between them. The central authority to compel Vela's allegiance was therefore weak. It is within these years that the definitive break between the count of Álava and the Castilian crown must be dated. Between October 1162 and January 1163, Sancho VI invaded Castile, occupying the Rioja and a large swathe of Old Castile. It is sometimes supposed that Sancho conquered the Basque lands, but there is no record of military activity there during this time and it is more likely that Vela simply took advantage of the Navarrese invasion to his south to further his own independent position. He must have taken part in or at the very least condoned the Navarrese attacks around Miranda de Ebro and west of the river Bayas.

During this period of civil war and invasion from 1160 to 1166, Vela's hold on Álava remained strong and he continues to be cited as count there in Navarrese documents. There is no evidence after this period that he recognised the authority of Alfonso VIII; nor did he the ecclesiastical authority of Rodrigo Cascante, the bishop of Calahorra, in whose diocese the Basque lands lay. After Vela's break with Castile, the church in the Basque provinces became effectively independent of its ecclesiastical superior. This would have been in the interests of the lay owners of churches and monasteries, many of whom were relatives of Vela Ladrón.

Vela was at the court of Alfonso VIII on 3 April 1173, where he was cited as lord of Ávila. He is last recorded on 28 July 1174, also at Alfonso's court. Sometime after this and by November 1174, he had died. Only with his death did the conflict between Castile and Navarre spill over into Álava and Biscay, which Alfonso VIII invaded in 1175. Vela's son Juan ruled Álava until 1179, when they were ceded to Navarre by treaty and Sancho gave them to Diego López II, son of Lope Díaz.

== Notes ==
Footnotes

Citations

== Sources ==
- Álvarez Borge, Ignacio (2008). Cambios y alianzas: la política regia en la frontera del Ebro en el reinado de Alfonso VIII de Castilla (1158–1214). Madrid: Consejo Superior de Investigaciones Científicas.
- Ayerbe Iríbar, María Rosa (1985). Historia del condado de Oñate y señorío de los Guevara (ss. XI–XVI): aportación al estudio del régimen señorial en Castilla. San Sebastián: Diputación Foral de Guipúzcoa.
- Balparda y las Herrerías, Gregorio de (1974). Historia crítica de Vizcaya y de sus Fueros. Vol. 2. Bilbao: Cajo de Ahorros Municipal de Bilbao.
- Carl, Carolina (2008). "The Bishop and the Basques: The Diocese of Calahorra and the Basque Provinces of Álava and Vizcaya under Bishop Rodrigo Cascante, 1147–1190". Journal of Medieval History. 34 (3): 229–44. doi:10.1016/j.jmedhist.2007.10.009. S2CID 154194411.
- Elizari Huarte, Juan Francisco (1991). Sancho VI el Sabio, rey de Navarra. Iruña: Editorial Mintzoa.
- Fortún Pérez de Ciriza, Luis Javier (2000). "La quiebra de la soberanía navarra en Álava, Guipúzcoa y el Duranguesado (1199–1200)" (PDF). Revista internacional de los estudios vascos. 45 (2): 439–94. Archived from the original (PDF) on 2020-11-30.
- Lacarra, José María (1972). "El señorío de Vizcaya y el reino de Navarra en el siglo XII". Edad Media y señoríos: el Señorío de Vizcaya (Simposium que tuvo lugar en la Biblioteca Provincial de Vizcaya, los días 5, 6 y 7 de marzo de 1971). Bilbao: Diputación de Vizcaya. pp. 37–50.
- Lema Pueyo, José Angel (1998). "Las cofradías y la introducción del Temple en los reinos de Aragón y Pamplona: guerra, intereses y piedad religiosa". Anuario de Estudios Medievales. 28: 311–31. doi:10.3989/aem.1998.v28.i0.588.
- Martínez Díez, Gonzalo (1974). Álava medieval. Vol. 1. Diputación Foral de Álava, Consejo de Cultura.
- Martínez Díez, Gonzalo (2001). "Las villas marítimas castellanas: origen y régimen jurídico". In Juan Baró Pazos; Margarita Serna Vallejo (eds.). El Fuero de Laredo en el octavo centenario de su concensión. Santander: Servicio de Publicaciones de la Universidad de Cantabria. pp. 45–86.
- Orella Unzué, José Luis (2011). "Nacimiento de Guipúzcoa como tenencia navarra de frontera" (PDF). Lurralde: Investigación y espacio. 34: 189–217.
- Reilly, Bernard F. (1998). The Kingdom of León-Castilla Under King Alfonso VII, 1126–1157. Philadelphia: University of Pennsylvania Press.
- Ubieto Arteta, Antonio (1956). "Navarra-Aragón y la idea imperial de Alfonso VII de Castilla". Estudios de Edad Media de la Corona de Aragón. 6: 41–82.
- Ubieto Arteta, Agustín (1980). "Cofrades aragoneses y navarros de la milicia del temple (siglo XII): Aspectos socio-económicos". Aragón en la Edad Media. 3: 29–94.
