= Lope Íñiguez =

Second Lord of Biscay (c. 1050–1093)

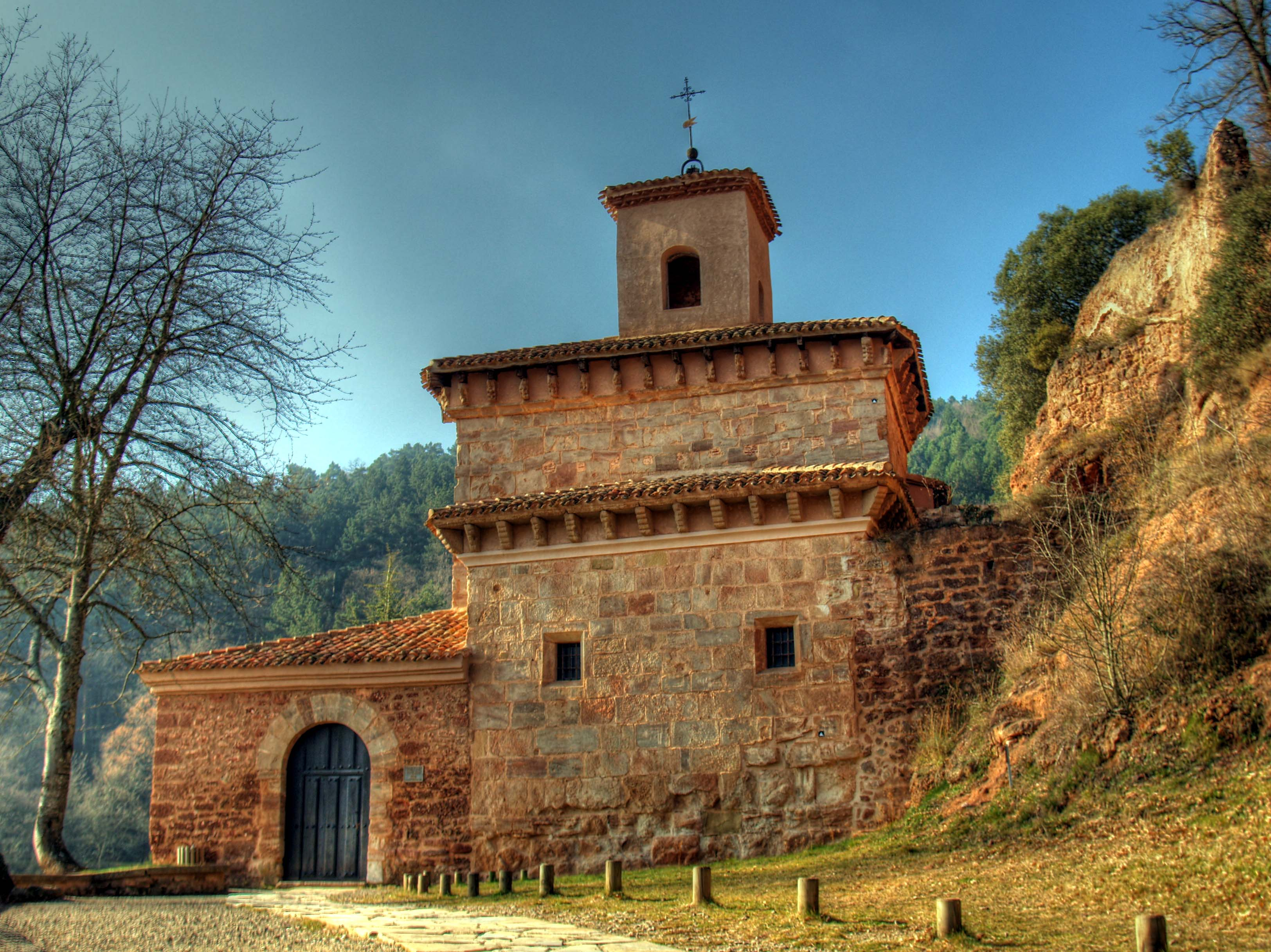
The monastery of San Millán: patronised by Lope, resting place of his wife, and indicator of his interest and affection for the Rioja.

Lope Íñiguez (c.. 1050 – 1093) succeeded his father Íñigo López to become the second Lord of Biscay in 1076.

Íñigo died shortly after the assassination of his overlord Sancho IV of Navarre and the subsequent takeover of Biscay, Álava, part of Guipúzcoa and La Rioja by Alfonso VI of Castile. He accepted Alfonso as his lord and his son followed suit, although after Íñigo's death the tenencia of Nájera, the most important in La Rioja, which he had held was given to García Ordóñez, husband of Urraca, sister of the deceased Navarrese king. Nevertheless, it was Lope and Diego Álvarez de Oca whom the king had swear to uphold and guarantee the fuero of Nájera which he had granted (1076).

For the loss of Nájera, Lope was compensated with the tenencias of Álava (1081) and Guipúzcoa (1082) and he was thus the first to unite the Basque provinces under one lord. The first record of his simultaneous rule in all three provinces comes from a charter of donation he made to the monastery of San Millán de la Cogolla in 1082, which he signed as "I, lord Lope Íñiguez, governing Biscay, Guipúzcoa and Álava". This concentration of political authority led to the suppression of the Diocese of Álava and the consignment of its province to the Diocese of Calahorra in 1087. In 1089 Lope received the title of count, the highest rank in the kingdom, from Alfonso. Lope's importance continued to grow, for in 1091, at his instigation, Alfonso VI donated the monastery of San Andrés de Astigarribia, which lay on the border between Biscay and Guipúzcoa, to San Millán.

Lope was a regular participant in Alfonso VI's Reconquista. He probably took part in the conquest of Toledo in 1085. Forces from Álava are known to have participated in the Battle of Sagrajas in 1086, probably under his leadership. In the spring of 1092 he probably joined with García Ordóñez in defending the Rioja from the depredations of the exile and freebooter Rodrigo Díaz de Vivar.

Lope married Ticlo (Tecla) Díaz, daughter of a certain Diego Álvarez, possibly Diego Álvarez de Ayala, who ruled Asturias de Santillana, but more probably Diego Álvarez de Oca. Their marriage took place before 1079, when the couple made a donation to San Millán. Ticlo may have brought part of Las Encartaciones to Lope, thus uniting them permanently with Biscay. She gave birth to an heir, Diego I, named after her father. The names Diego and Lope would alternate in the heads of the family for generations. Ticlo bore four other children: Sancho, Toda (who married Lope González, who succeeded Lope in Álava), Sancha and Teresa (who married García Sánchez de Zurbano and later went on a pilgrimage to Rome). Shortly after Lope's death in 1093 Ticlo donated the monastery of Albóniga to San Millán for the good of his soul. She died towards 1104 and was buried in San Millán. Lope may also have been the father of Pedro López de Monforte.

| Preceded by Íñigo López | Lord of Biscay; 1076–1093 | Succeeded by Diego López I de Haro |
