= Juan Vélaz =

Lord of Álava

Juan Vélaz (sometimes Juan Vélez or Juan Vela) was the lord of Álava from 1174 until 1179. He was the eldest son of Count Vela Ladrón, whom he succeeded.

Juan's father is last cited as count on 28 July 1174 and died shortly thereafter. Juan is first recorded as holding Álava in November 1174, when he was in Pamplona to witness the charter of the village of Villanueva de Araquil (Hiriberri). Although his father maintained his independence of action by dividing his allegiance between King Sancho VI of Navarre and King Alfonso VIII of Castile, Juan does not appear to have ever attended the Castilian court while he was lord of Álava.

In 1175, Alfonso VIII invaded the Basque lands of Álava, Vizcaya and Guipúzcoa. There is no record of Juan governing Álava in 1178, after the arbitral decision of Henry II of England the previous year. In a treaty of 15 April 1179 Alfonso recognised the sovereignty of Navarre over Álava. In the same treaty Juan was granted the right to switch allegiance to the king of Castile if the king of Navarre ever tried to dispossess him of any of his lands without a trial. It is unknown in what circumstances Juan was removed from Álava, but before the year was out Sancho had taken over the county. Sancho divided Álava into several smaller tenancies.

By 1181, Juan had taken up service with Alfonso of Castile. On 21 March he signed as a witness the treaty of Medina de Rioseco, which ended a war (1179–81) between Castile and León and defined their border around the river Cea. On 12 May 1182 he was with the royal court at Toledo. There is no further record of him after that.

== Sources ==
- Ayerbe Iríbar, María Rosa (1985). Historia del condado de Oñate y señorío de los Guevara (ss. XI–XVI): aportación al estudio del régimen señorial en Castilla. San Sebastián: Diputación Foral de Guipúzcoa.
- Fortún Pérez de Ciriza, Luis Javier (2000). "La quiebra de la soberanía navarra en Álava, Guipúzcoa y el Duranguesado (1199–1200)" (PDF). Revista internacional de los estudios vascos. 45 (2): 439–94. Archived from the original (PDF) on 2020-11-30.
- Martínez Díez, Gonzalo (1974). Álava medieval. Vol. 1. Diputación Foral de Álava, Consejo de Cultura.
- Orella Unzué, José Luis (2011). "Nacimiento de Guipúzcoa como tenencia navarra de frontera" (PDF). Lurralde: Investigación y espacio. 34: 189–217.
- Pascua Echegaray, Esther (2001). "South of the Pyrenees: Kings, Magnates and Political Bargaining in Twelfth-century Spain". Journal of Medieval History. 27 (2): 101–20. doi:10.1016/s0304-4181(01)00003-3. S2CID 54662066.
