= Ladrón Íñiguez =

Ladrón Íñiguez (died 1155), also known as Ladrón Navarro, was a leading nobleman of the Kingdom of Navarre during the reign of García Ramírez (1134–50), whose accession he was instrumental in bringing about. He is regularly titled count (comes), the highest rank in the kingdom, after 1135. He is recorded in contemporary documents with the title princeps Navarrorum (prince of the Navarrese). Between 1124 and his death he was the effective ruler of the Basque country (Euskadi).

== Navarrese succession ==
He was the eldest son of Íñigo Vélaz (died 1129) and Aurea Jiménez. His relationship to the Vela family is supposed on the basis of onomastics, his father being presumed to be the younger brother of Ladrón Vélaz, thus providing a route for the name "Ladrón" into the name-pool of Íñigo's descendants. Ladrón's age can only be estimated by the witness of his sons Vela and Lope in a charter of 1135, by which point they must have been teenagers.

According to the Crónica de San Juan de la Peña the initiative in placing García on the throne following the death of Alfonso the Battler, was taken by the bishop of Pamplona, Sancho de Larrosa, and several magnates of the kingdom, Ladrón first among them. As early as August 1134 Ladrón appears as first after the king and queen (Marguerite de l'Aigle) in witnessing the royal donation of Jániz and Zuazu to the Cathedral of Santa María de Pamplona. In 1135 Ladrón was among three Navarrese homes buenos ("good men") who, at Vadoluengo (Vedadoluengo), tried unsuccessfully to negotiate a peace with Ramiro II of Aragon, who claimed Navarre. Subsequent to this García made Ladrón conte en Pamplona (count in Pamplona) on the same day that he dubbed and ennobled many in the same city in preparation for the war with Aragon, which never came.

== Ruling the Basque country ==
In 1135 King García confirmed the rights and privileges of the Diocese of Pamplona on the advice of his magnates, among whom Ladrón (comes Latro) is named first. On 2 November 1137, Ladrón witnessed the donation of Alfonso VII of León to San Millán de la Cogolla. In 1140 Alfonso invaded Navarre, including the lands of Ladrón, an event recorded in the Chronica Adefonsi imperatoris:

While these battles were taking place, the Emperor was waging war in the land of King García of Navarra. He had captured some of his fortified castles and some of those belonging to Count Ladrón Navarro. This individual was the most noble of all the princes in King García's court. The Emperor devastated the land by plundering it and burning it. He also cut down the vineyards and the orchards. Count Ladrón pleaded to obey Alfonso VII in the face of this destruction. He pledged to obey him and serve him all the days of his life.

The history of the Basque señoríos in the early part of the twelfth century is very obscure. The lordships of Biscay, Guipúzcoa, and Álava were in the hands of Diego López I de Haro, a vassal of Urraca of Castile, until 1124, when he was dispossessed by Alfonso the Battler. Ladrón appears as count of Álava in 1131, while his father was still living, and he held all three Basque lordships (Álava, Biscay, and Guipúzcoa) as a vassal of Navarre between 1135 and 1147. He is also cited as lord of Araquil, Leguín, and Estíbaliz, all under the suzerainty of García, though these Basque provinces exhibited a high degree of autonomy. He was the lord of Guevara and the founder of the Ladrón de Guevara branch of his family.

In September 1136 Alfonso VII made him the governor of Viguera, which may have interrupted his rule in the Basque provinces, during which his son Vela may have governed in his stead. In the period around 1140–47 he appears in the Basque country again and sometime after February 1140 he appears in possession of Aibar. From 1143 he patronised the monastery of San Miguel de Aralar.

== Legends ==
According to an apocryphal story reported by Esteban de Garibay y Zamalloa in his Ilustraciones Genealógicas de los Catholicos Reyes de las Españas, when García VI created twelve peers in Navarre in imitation of the twelve peers of France, Ladrón Íñiguez was first among them. Also according to Garibay, Ladrón took part in the reconquest of Tudela in 1114. The story of his founding the majorat of Oñate (which he supposedly willed to his son) in 1149, along with his wife Teresa, a daughter of the viscount of Soule and Mauléon, is also apocryphal.

Preceded by Íñigo Vélaz	Lord of Biscay c. 1131–1155	Succeeded by Vela Ladrón

== Primary sources ==
- Glenn Edward Lipskey (1972), The Chronicle of Alfonso the Emperor: A Translation of the Chronica Adefonsi imperatoris, with Study and Notes, PhD dissertation, Northwestern University.
- Carmen Orcástegui Gros (1985), "Crónica de San Juan de la Peña (Versión aragonesa)", Cuadernos de Historia Jerónimo Zurita, 51–52 (Zaragoza: Institución «Fernando el Católico»), 419–569.
