= Ladrones Islands =

Ladrones Islands may refer to:

- Islas de los Ladrones, the old name for a series of islands under U.S. jurisdiction in the Pacific Ocean, now known as the Mariana Islands
- Ladrones Islands, part of the Wanshan Archipelago, in Guangdong Province, China
- Los Ladrones, islands in the Gulf of Chiriquí, Panama

== See also ==
- Ladrones (disambiguation)
