= Diego López II de Haro =

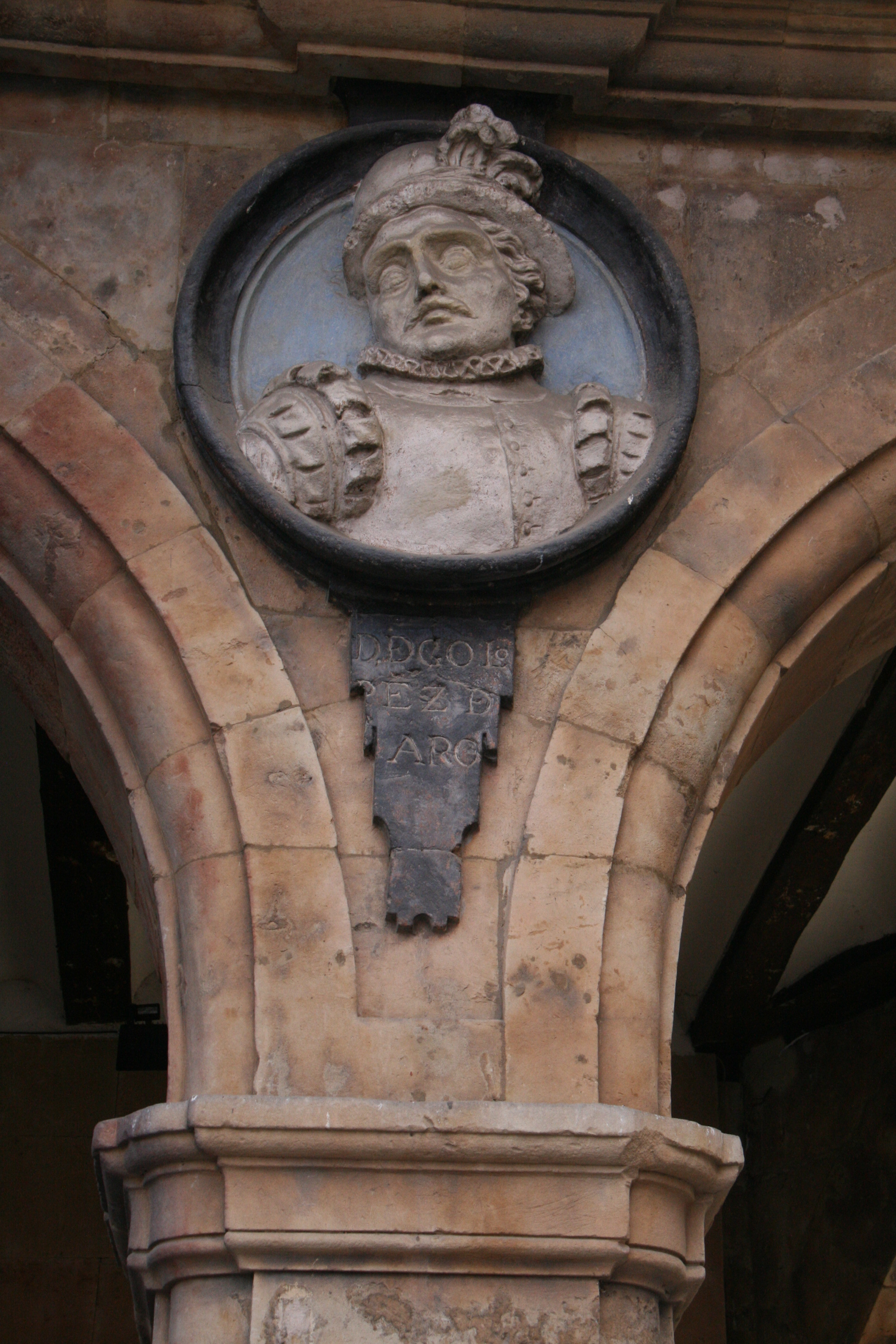

Lord of Biscay
- Reign: 1170–1214
- Predecessor: Lope Díaz I de Haro
- Successor: Lope Díaz II de Haro
- Born: c. 1152
- Died: 16 September 1214
- Buried: Santa María la Real of Nájera
- Noble family: Haro
- Spouses: María Manrique de Lara; Toda Pérez de Azagra
- Issue among others...: Lope Díaz II de Haro
- Father: Lope Díaz I de Haro
- Mother: Aldonza Rodríguez

Diego López II de Haro called the Good or the Bad (c. 1152 – 16 September 1214). Son of Lope Diaz I de Haro, count of Nájera (b. 1126–1170) and of countess Aldonza. He was a first rank magnate in the kingdom of Castile under King Alfonso VIII (1158–1214). He played a decisive role in the rise of the Haro dynasty, as well as in the construction of the nobiliary identity of his group, who was to dominate the Castilian political society during the whole 13th century. A publicity strife around this key figure between his successors and the monarchy, in a moment of deep political troubles, led to the elaboration of his dark image and his golden legend at the end of the 13th century, and the invention of his opposite nicknames.

== Role at Alfonso VIII's court and exile strategy ==
He did not attend the royal court with any regularity before 1178, maybe because of the influence exerted by the magnates of the Lara family. Between 1179 and 1183, he went into exile in Navarra. He went back to the Castilian court in a strong position, obtaining the office of alférez, standard bearer, one of the two most prestigious with that of great major-domo. The rise of his parents in the neighboring kingdom of León let him catch sight of better opportunities in 1187, when his sister Urraca López married King Fernando II. Thus he left Castile, but the good fortune of his family in León did not survive the king's death, the following year. He retained sufficient credit in Castile to negotiate his return with favorable conditions: he was given back the office of alférez and all his governments. In charge of the rearguard, he took part in 1195 in the battle of Alarcos against the Almohads, and the defense of the territory after the Castilian rout. The king put him apart from 1199 on, depriving him of the office of alférez for the benefit of count Álvaro Núñez de Lara. He went into exile a third time between 1201 and 1206, offering his services to Navarra and León. He had nevertheless made himself indispensable for the Castilian sovereign. In his first will, in 1206, Alfonso VIII recognized having wronged the magnate, and tried to repair the damages. When Diego López decided to come back in Castile in 1206, Alfonso VIII gave him back his full confidence as his alférez, before handing over the office to Álvaro Núñez de Lara again in 1208. That very year, Alfonso VIII named Diego López one of his five executors. In 1212, the king entrusted to him one of his three armies in the battle of Las Navas de Tolosa, that allowed the Christian kingdoms to get rid of the power of the Almohads in al-Andalus. The chronicler Juan de Osma asserted that the king had made him the future regent of the child-king Henry I. But Diego López II died a few weeks before Alfonso VIII.

== Governments ==
His first exile of 1179-1183 allowed his to recover the territories his father had ruled, La Rioja, Old Castile and Trasmiera. He also obtained Asturias (of Santillana) and the Bureba. After his second exile, he extended even more his area of influence in Northeastern Castile, to the point of ruling "from Almazán to the sea" (1196). In 1204, in order to urge him to come back in Castile, Alfonso VIII acknowledged his ownership of the whole of Bizcaya, a Basque territory his ancestors had ruled back in the 11th century. This instrument may have meant the definitive conversion of this government into an inalienable fief, that would be the territorial basis of the Haro during the whole 13th century. He added Durando in 1212, a gift of the king no long after the battle of Las Navas de Tolosa. He took a decisive step towards the patrimonialization of many of those governments, sharing them with his elder son, Lope Díaz II de Haro. Lope thus received the governments of Old Castile in 1210, Asturias de Santillana in 1211, and Álava en 1213.

== Construction of dynastic identity ==
Diego López II strengthened the part of the head of family among his clan, permitting the shift from the "horizontal" conception of kinship to the "vertical" system of dynasty. He was the first of his family to use an apellido or family name, that notaries start to attribute to him in documents from 1184 on.

== Mythified character ==
Arms of the House of Haro.

Diego López II's memory quickly underwent attacks. As soon as 1216, during the regency of the Lara brothers, when Lope Díaz II de Haro was trying to play a political role, the royal chancellery issued a charter judging him a bad lord. Diego López's image constructed around 1240–1241 by the chronicler Rodrigo Jiménez de Rada, Toledo's archbishop, who had known him personally, was already very ambiguous. He criticized his exile strategy that led him to face his king on the battlefield. The tombs of Diego López and of his wife Toda Pérez, in the cloister of knights of the abbey of Santa María de Nájera, were both realized during the second half of the 13th century. They bear testimony of the specific interest of the Haros for this founder ancestor.
During 1270–1280, when Lope Díaz III de Haro was brought against King Alfonso X of Castile-León, in nobiliary rebellions ever more open, intellectuals from the court denigrated the reputation of Diego López "said the Good", to whom the responsibility of the defeat of Alarcos was for the first time attributed. Writers supporting the Haros invented in this period an equivalent myth to justify Diego López II's attitude and to charge the monarchy. The story of the Jewish girl from Toledo, which explains the rout at Alarcos with the sins of Alfonso VIII, appeared towards the end of the 13th century.
During 1340, the books of the Portuguese count Pedro de Barcelos, the Crónica Geral de 1344 and the Livros de linhagens definitely turned the biography of Diego López II into a myth. This author relates episodes allegedly historical, but similar to well known literary themes from Brittany (Arthurian romances) and French epic. He converted him into an ambiguous character, in a pseudo-historical attempt to synthesize his dark image and his golden legend.
In the middle of the 15th century, Lope García de Salázar, in his Crónica de Vizcaya, finally imagined the nickname "the Bad" to explain the contradictions in his biography. His memory suffered later other deformations, according to the interests of the 16th-century genealogists working for the nobility, and, from the 17th century on, of Basque historians. This time, it was the myth of the "independent seigneury" of Biscaya that was at stake between Basque fuerists and later nationalists, and their contradictors, until the first half of the 20th century.

== Marriage and children ==
He married first with Maria Manrique de Lara, fourth daughter of Manrique Perez de Lara, I señor de Molina. Their son was:

- Lope Díaz II de Haro – succeeded his father as señorío de Vizcaya.

He married secondly with Toda Pérez de Azagra, daughter of Pedro Rodriguez de Azagra and Toda (or Tota) Perez, and had several children:

- Pedro Díaz – lord of Cárcar thanks to his mother and his maternal grandparents.
- Urraca Díaz – married count Álvaro Núñez de Lara (died 1218).
- Aldonza Díaz – married Ruy Díaz de los Cameros.
- María Díaz – married count Gonzalo Núñez de Lara (died 1225).
- Teresa Díaz de Haro – married her cousin, Infant Sancho of León, son of King Fernando II and Urraca López de Haro
- Mencía Díaz – married Alvaro Díaz de los Cameros.

Diego López II de Haro House of Haro Born: circa 1152 Died: 16 September 1214
Regnal titles
| Preceded by Lope Díaz I de Haro | Lord of Biscay; 1170–1214 | Succeeded by Lope Díaz II de Haro |

== Bibliography ==
- Salazar y Castro, Luis (1959): Historia genealógica de la Casa de Haro, Dalmiro de la Válgoma y Díaz-Varela, Madrid.
- Baury, Ghislain, « Diego López 'le bon' et Diego López 'le mauvais' : comment s'est construite la mémoire d'un magnat du règne d'Alphonse VIII de Castille », Berceo, n°144, 2003, p. 37-92, .
- Baury, Ghislain, « Los ricoshombres y el rey en Castilla : El linaje Haro, 1076-1322 », Territorio, Sociedad y Poder : Revista de Estudios Medievales, 6, 2011, p. 53-72, .
