= Ladrones =

Ladrones may refer to:

== Films ==
- Night Owls (1930 film), a 1930 Laurel and Hardy film, Spanish-language version Ladrones
- Ladrones (2015 film), a comedy directed by Joe Menendez

== Islands ==
- Islas de los Ladrones, the old name for a series of islands under U.S. jurisdiction in the Pacific Ocean, now known as the Mariana Islands
- Ladrones Islands, part of the Wanshan Archipelago, in Guangdong Province, China
  - Pirates of the South China Coast, referred to as Ladrones
- Los Ladrones, islands in the Gulf of Chiriquí, Panama

== Music ==
- Ladrones (band), a Mexican metal band

== See also ==
- Ladrones y Mentirosos, Spanish-language name of the 2006 film Thieves and Liars
- Ladrón, a name
- Ladrones Islands (disambiguation)
