= Cárcar =

Town in Navarre, Spain

Coordinates: 42°23′N 1°58′W

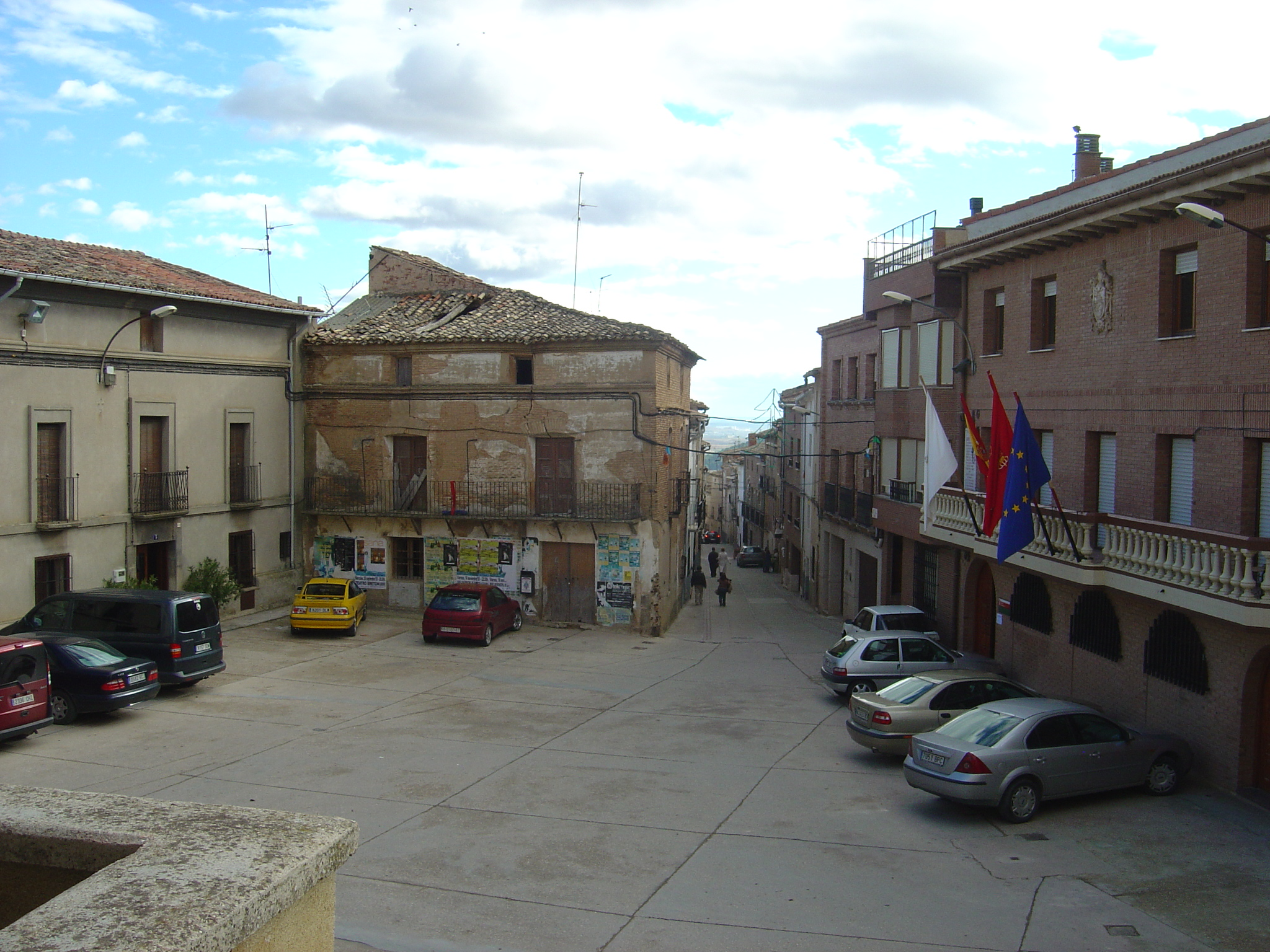
Carcar, Navarra

Cárcar's coat of arms

Cárcar is a town and municipality in the Foral Community of Navarre, located in the merindad of Tierra Estella, in the comarca Ribera del Alto Ebro in northern Spain. Its about 38 km from Estella and 75 km from the regional capital of Pamplona. Its population in 2025 was 1,156 (INE)
