= Estíbaliz =

Estíbaliz may refer to:

== Persons ==
- Estíbaliz Gabilondo (born 1976), Spanish actress and journalist
- Estíbaliz Martínez (born 1980), Spanish rhythmic gymnast and Olympic champion
- Estíbaliz Pereira (born 1986), Spanish beauty queen
- Estíbaliz Uranga (born 1952), Spanish singer
- Estíbaliz Urrutia (born 1970), Spanish long-distance runner

== de Estíbaliz ==
=== Places ===
- Sanctuary of Nuestra Señora de Estíbaliz, Argandoña, Spain
- Villafranca de Estíbaliz, a village in Álava, Basque Country, Spain

== See also ==
- Sergio y Estíbaliz, Spanish duo
