= Gamiz-Fika =

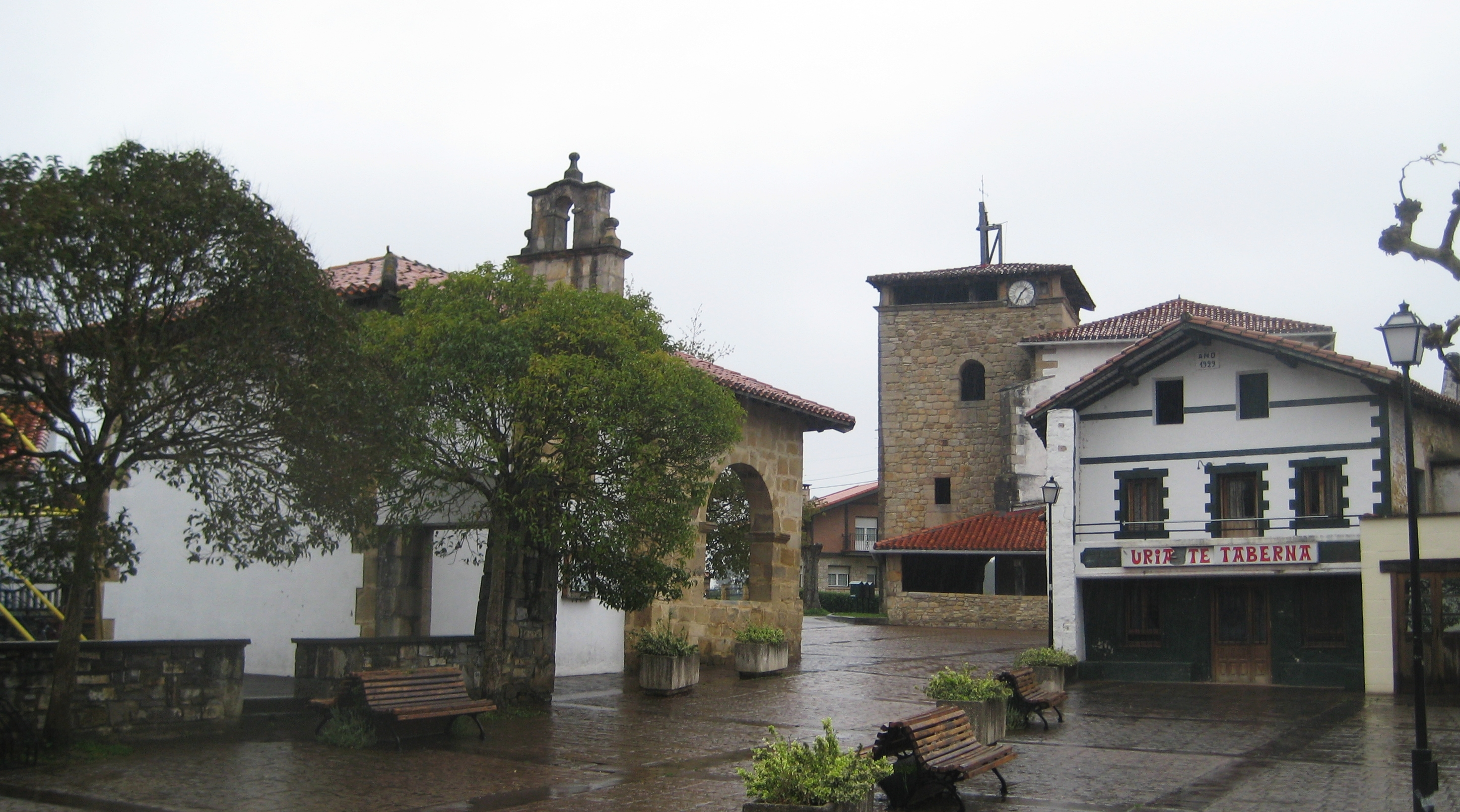
- Center of the village

- Coat of arms

- Location in the Basque Country#Location in Spain Gamiz-Fika (Spain)
- Coordinates: 43°18′51″N 2°49′30″W
- Country: Spain
- Autonomous community: Biscay

Area
  - Total: 15.50 km^{2} (5.98 sq mi)
- Elevation: 55 m (180 ft)

Population (2025-01-01)
  - Total: 1,414
  - Density: 91.23/km^{2} (236.3/sq mi)
- Time zone: UTC+1 (CET)
  - Summer (DST): UTC+2 (CEST)
- Website: www.gamiz-fika.com

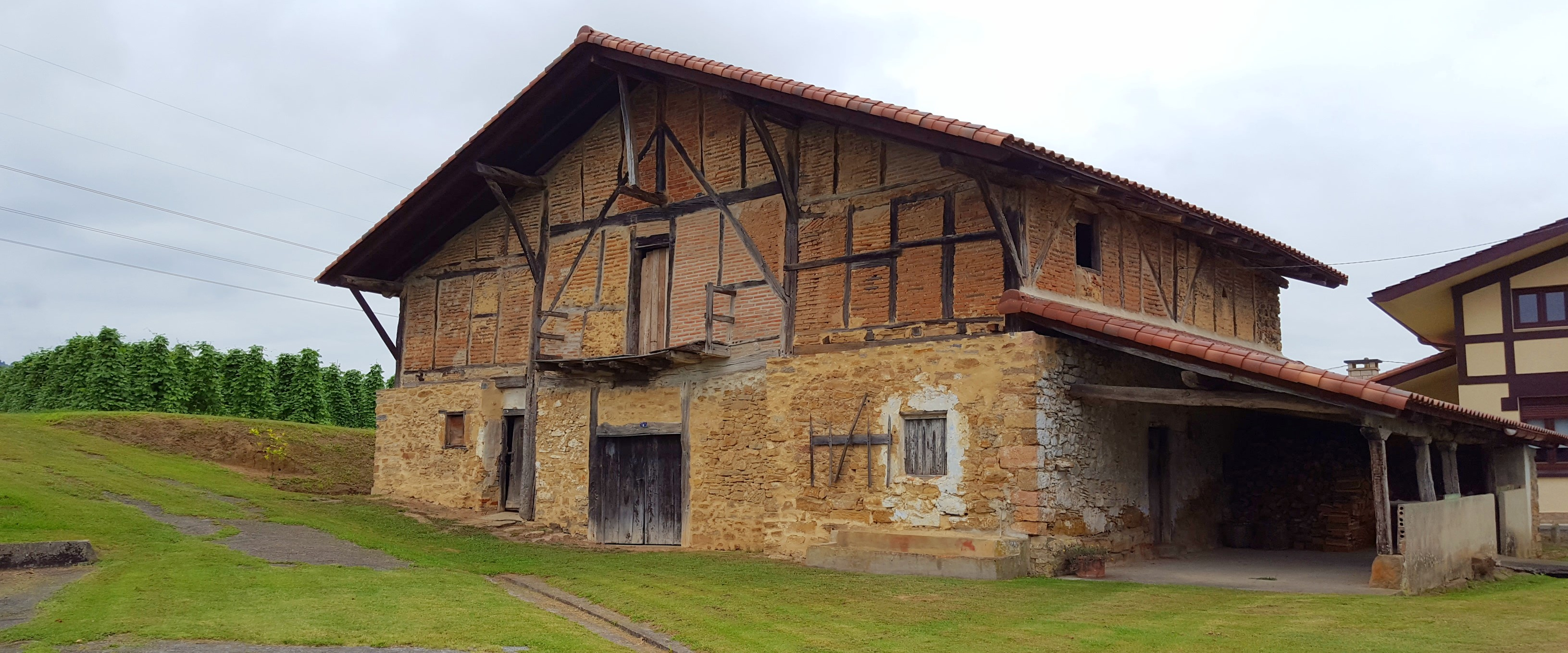
Errementari blacksmith house (17th century)

Gamiz-Fika is a town and municipality located in the province of Biscay, in the autonomous community of Basque Country, northern Spain.
