= Garai, Spain =

Garai
- Municipality
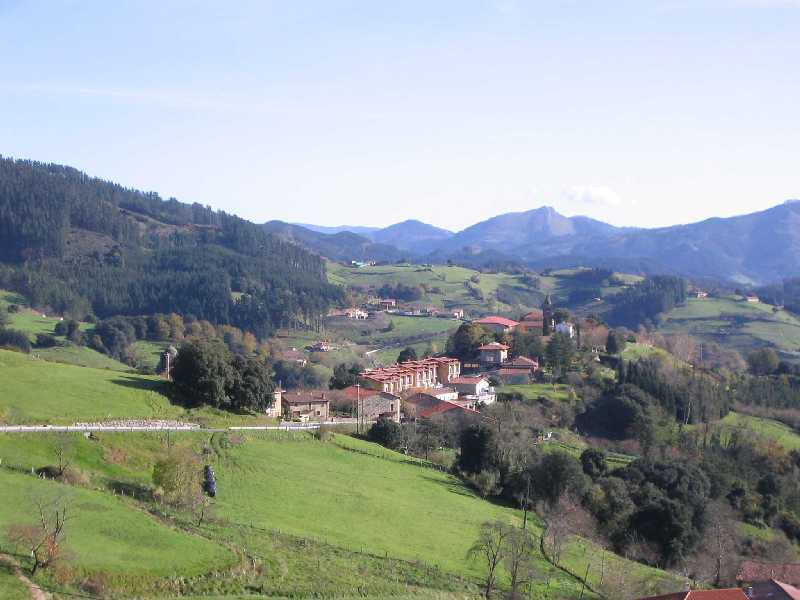
- Overview of Garai

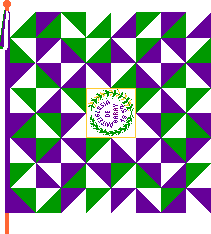
- Flag Coat of arms

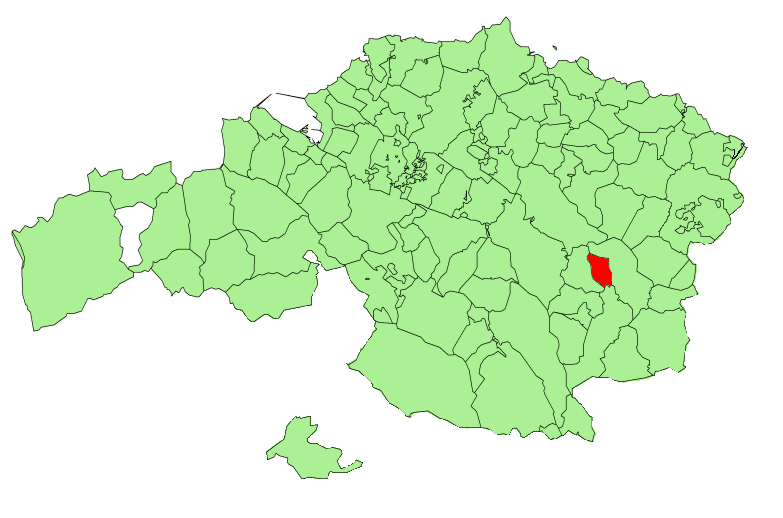
- Location of Garai within Biscay

- Location of Garai within the Basque Country Garai (Spain)
- Coordinates: 43°11′41″N 2°36′35″W
- Country: Spain
- Autonomous community: País Vasco
- Province: Biscay
- Comarca: Durangaldea
- Established: Not known

Government
  - Mayor: Gontzal Sarrigoitia (Herriko Taldea)

Area
  - Total: 7.12 km^{2} (2.75 sq mi)
- Elevation: 300 m (980 ft)

Population (2025-01-01)
  - Total: 332
  - Density: 46.6/km^{2} (121/sq mi)
- Demonym: Garaitarra
- Time zone: UTC+1 (CET)
  - Summer (DST): UTC+2 (CEST)
- Postal code: 48200

Garai (in Basque and officially, in Spanish Garay) is an elizate, town and municipality located in the province of Biscay, in the Basque Country, Spain. Garai is part of the comarca of Durangaldea and has a population of 318 inhabitants as of 2009 according to the Spanish National Statistics Institute.

== Toponymy ==
The complete name of the elizate was San Miguel de Garay, but the municipality was named just "Garay". The name may have two different origins; one due its geographical location, as Garai is located in the upper area of Durangaldea and garai is the Basque word for "upper" or "the upper part"; but also, the name might be related to the hórreos, very common in this area of Biscay and that have the Basque name of garaidxe. Then, San Miguel de Garay could be translated as "San Miguel of the upper part" of "San Miguel of the hórreos".

Traditionally, the name of the town has been written as "Garay", but according to the new orthographic rules of the Basque language, the correct spelling is "Garai". In the 1990s, the town hall changed the official denomination from Garay to Garai.

== History ==
As happens with most of the elizates, the origin and date of foundation of the town is unknown. As a member of the ancient merindad of Durango, it had voice and right to vote in the Juntas of Guerendiaga, where it occupied the seat number six. The town was divided into two neighborhoods and it was focused on farming activities; production of corn, wheat, several sorts of vegetables, legumes, cherries, apples and chestnuts.

In the oldest part of the town is located a small palace-baserri named Garatikua and built by Juan de Garay, governor of Paraguay. In the 19th century, it was called "Garay-Goitia".

On May 1, 1966, the terrorist-separatist organization ETA occupied the town for several hours in one of its first official actions. The telephone lines were shut down, several graffities were made and the Ikurriña (at that time, illegal) was set on a visible part of the town. The command abandoned the town before the arriving of the Civil Guard.

== Geography ==
Garai is located in the eastern part of the province of Biscay, in the comarca of Durangaldea, northern Spain. It has an extension of 7,12 km^{2}. It limits at north and east with Berriz, at south with Abadiño and at west with Iurreta.
