= Basque señoríos =

Feudal territories in Basque Country during the Middle Ages

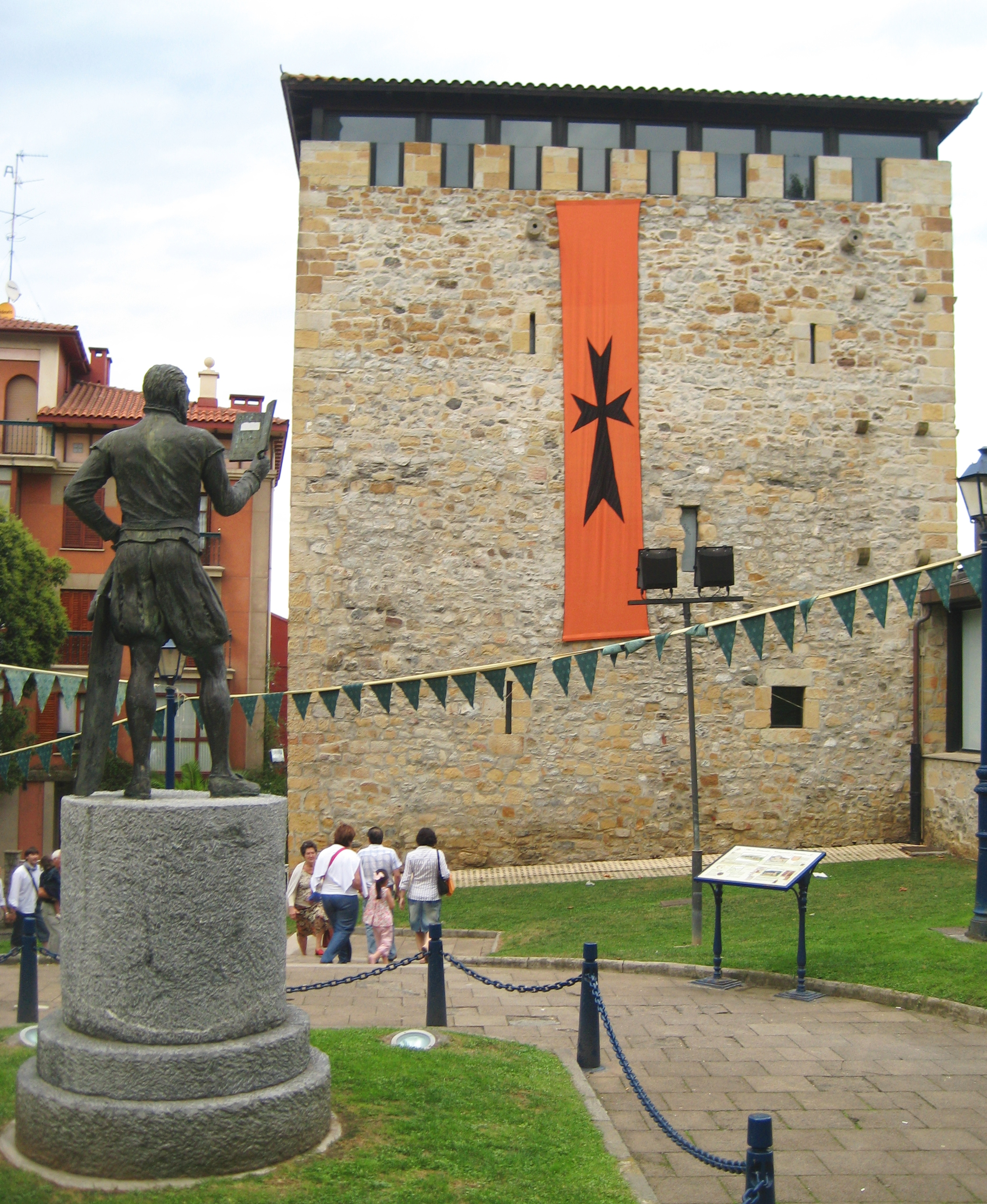
The dorretxeak or tower-houses were vigil fortified towers common in the areas controlled by the Señoríos.

The Basque jaurerriak or señoríos (literally, the Basque lordships) were a series of feudal territories that came into existence in the Basque Country in the Middle Ages. The lordships were hereditary land titles over territories of variable size under the name of a lord or count. The title and lands were often recognized by kings to Basque chieftains. It is loosely related to the concept of manorialism as the king had to swear allegiance to the Foral law in exchange for military assistance from the Basque chiefs, who were considered sovereign over their own lands and people. The Basque señoríos generally conformed vassal states of larger kingdoms; most of them started as domains of the Kingdom of Pamplona (later Navarre) but were conquered and attached to the Kingdom of Castile by the 13th century. The Basque term jaurerria (pronounced [jauˈɾeria]) means "the lord's country" and it is usually used to refer to these feudal territories.

The feudal title confirmed considerable powers to the holder, which in other areas were directly controlled by the king. The Lord or Count was a sovereign judicial and military high authority, who ruled directly without referring to a king. The powers of the lord included the appointment of government and civil servants and collection of taxes, as well as the powers to sign external treaties, raise armies and wage wars.

The largest and most important of the señoríos was the Lordship of Biscay, which comprised the entire territory of the present-day province of Biscay.

== Señoríos ==
=== Lordship of Biscay ===
The Lordship of Biscay was a feudal territory comprising the present-day province of Biscay. It was ruled by the Lord of Biscay. It was the largest and most powerful of the Basque señoríos, and acted as a semi-autonomous territory with its own naval ensign and international consulates from the 11th century until its dissolution in 1876. The Lordship was first a vassal state of the Kingdom of Pamplona, but starting in the 13th century it was conquered and later annexed by the Kingdom of Castile. The House of Haro were the bearers of the title after the Castilian conquest and until 1379, when John I of Castile inherited the title and lands.

The Lordship was integrated by three constituent lands:

- The Lur Laua or Tierra Llana (meaning "flat land"), referred to the non-fortified towns and villages of Biscay, which were organised in elizates.
- The Enkarterri, a historical region west of the river Nervión.
- The County of Durango, comprising a previously autonomous county who was eventually integrated into the Lordship.

=== Lordship of Gipuzkoa ===
A feudal territory comprising most of the present-day province of Gipuzkoa. It was annexed by Alfonso VIII of Castile to the Kingdom of Castile in the year 1200.

=== County of Álava ===
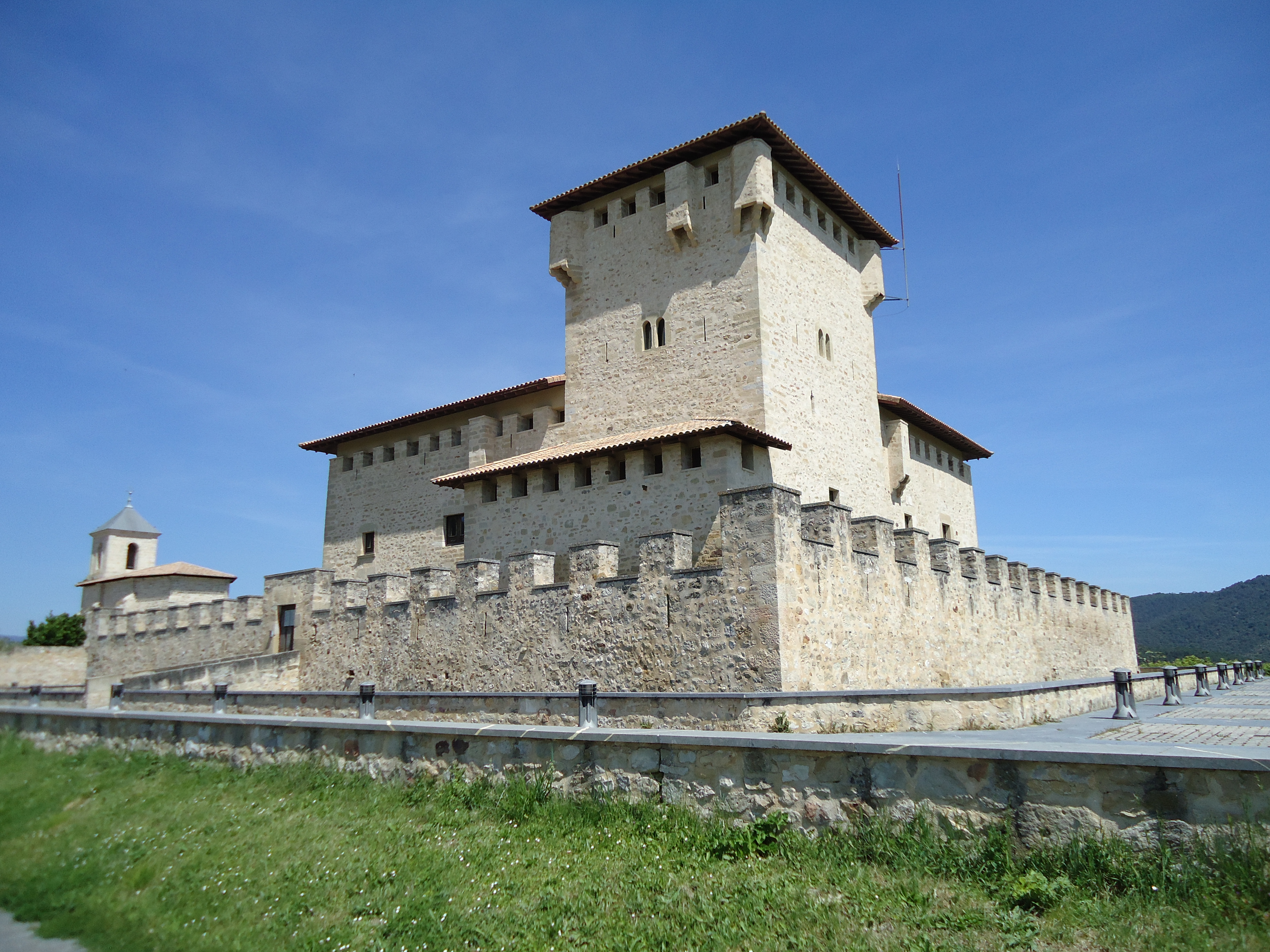
Tower-house of Varona, in Álava.

The County of Álava comprised most of the present-day province of Álava from its consolidation in the 9th century until its dissolution in the year 1200 after being conquered by Alfonso VIII and annexed to the Kingdom of Castile. The county changed hands frequently, being controlled by the kingdoms of Asturias, Castile and Navarre at different times. The figure governing the County had the title of Count of Álava.

=== Lordship of Oñate ===
The smallest of the Basque señoríos, it comprised the territory surrounding the fortified city of Oñati, in present-day Gipuzkoa. The lordship was originally awarded by the Navarrese monarchs to the members of the House of Guevara, who all originated in the village with the same name in Álava. As such, the lordship had strong links with the Kingdom of Pamplona, but also with the County of Álava. The lordship was conquered by Castile circa the year 1200, but the titles were ratified by the Catholic Monarchs to the Guevara family in the year 1481.

The lordship was dissolved in 1845, when Oñati was finally integrated into the province of Gipuzkoa.
