= Elizate =

Early form of local government in the Basque Country

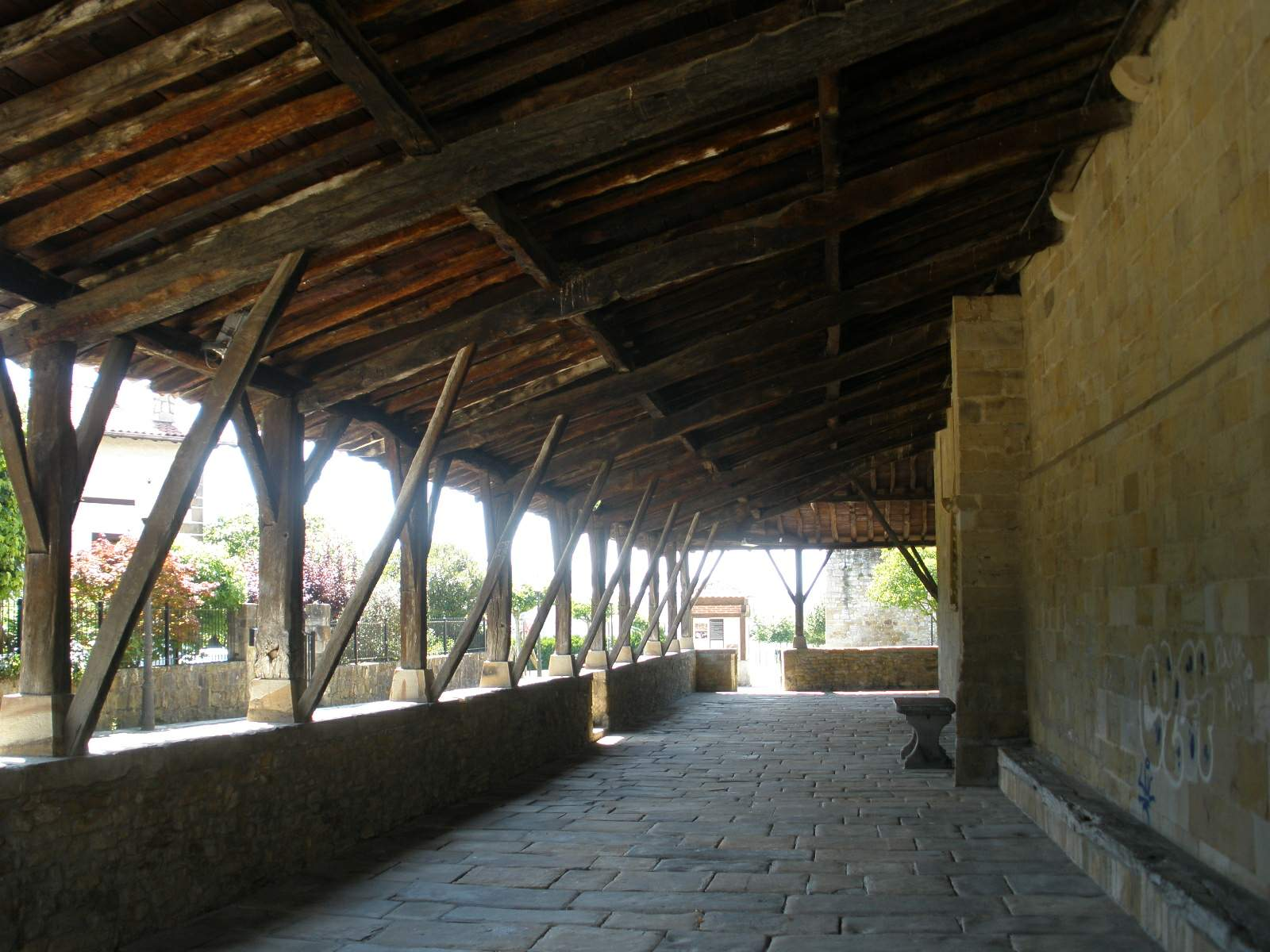
Porch of Saint Martin's church in Zamudio.

An elizate (Basque pronunciation: [elis̻ate]), (Spanish: anteiglesia) is an early form of local government in the Basque Country which was particularly common in Biscay but also existed in the other provinces. The terms elizate (in Standard Basque) and elexate (in Biscayan) literally translate as "church door" (eliza "church" + ate "door"). The Spanish term anteiglesia translates as "before [the] church" or "parvise".

The peculiar name derives from the Basque custom where the family heads of a settlement connected to a particular parish would gather after mass at the entrance or portico of the church to make decisions regarding issues affecting their community. Their medieval history is closely linked to the emergence of the Batzar Nagusiak or "Grand Meetings", especially those of Biscay and Gipuzkoa (Juntas Generales de Vizcaya/Guipúzcoa in Spanish) and the establishment of parochial churches. Each elizate would elect a representative who would represent the elizate at a Batzar Nagusia, so the elizate represents an early form of local democracy. These enjoyed considerable autonomy in decision-making from the higher administrative authorities.

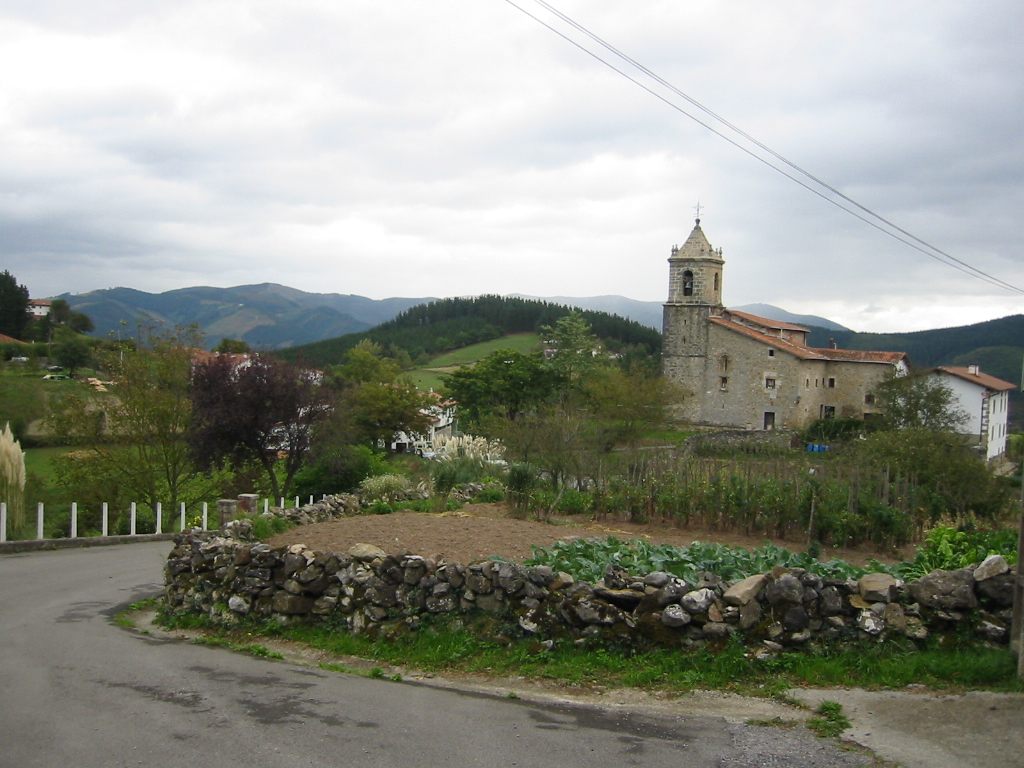
The elizate of Bedoña near Arrasate which was only incorporated into a municipality in the 1960s

An elizate was steered by a fiel sindiko (fiel síndico in Spanish), who would organise meetings and bear a makila as a sign of authority. A fiel was normally chosen for one year through a number of methods. Some were nominated by the outgoing fiel, in some places the position of fiel would rotate through all farmholders of the elizate and in others the most recently married farmholder would be named fiel. Each elizate was subdivided into smaller units called kofradiak (cofradías in Spanish, "brotherhoods") which corresponded to the individual boroughs of an elizate.

A group of elizates was a merindad.

Through time elizates often became municipalities. In Biscay, during the time of the Lordship of Biscay (Bizkaiko Jaurerria in Basque, Señorío de Vizcaya in Spanish), the territory of all anteiglesias were referred to as Flat Land (Lur Laua in Basque, Tierra Llana in Spanish), as opposed to the more stratified cities. It was further incorporated into the administration. They became subject to the fueros which at the same time re-affirmed the status of nobility to all farmholders. This meant that unlike in most of feudal Europe, the farmers legally owned their land.

After centuries of political change, very few elizate remain today, two of the most notable in Iurreta and Derio. In 1962, in Francoist Spain, the name of the elizates was changed to auzo (neighbourhood, district) and they were merged into municipalities. The current term, auzo, is undistinguishable from the subdivisions of a city, which are called by the same term.

== See also ==
- The Water Tribunal of Valencia, Spain is unrelated to elizates, but also holds sessions at the church door.
