= House of Haro =

Castilian noble family

Haro
- Titles: Lordship of Biscay

The House of Haro was one of the most powerful families of Castile during the Middle Ages, which strongly supported the expansionist policies of Alfonso VI of Castile. As a reward, Íñigo López was named the first Lord of Biscay.

In the early 16th century, the Haro family married paternally into the House of Sotomayor establishing a branch that would go on to hold dominion over the Marquesado del Carpio established in 1559 by King Philip II of Spain.

== Bibliography ==
- Salazar y Castro, Luis, Historia genealógica de la Casa de Haro, Dalmiro de la Válgoma y Díaz-Varela, Madrid, 1959.
- Baury, Ghislain, "Diego López 'le bon' et Diego López 'le mauvais' : comment s'est construite la mémoire d'un magnat du règne d'Alphonse VIII de Castille", Berceo, n°144, 2003, p. 37-92.
- Baury, Ghislain, « Los ricoshombres y el rey en Castilla : El linaje Haro, 1076-1322 », Territorio, Sociedad y Poder : Revista de Estudios Medievales, 6, 2011, p. 53-72. .
- Baury, Ghislain, « La grande aristocratie et le système judiciaire dans le royaume de Castille (XIIe-XIIIe s.). Les sentences des ricoshombres du lignage Haro », Bruno Lemesle et Benoît Garnot (dir.), Autour de la sentence judiciaire du Moyen Âge à l'époque contemporaine, Dijon, EUD, 2012, ISBN 978-2-36441-028-2, p. 239-248.
- Baury, Ghislain, Les religieuses de Castille. Patronage aristocratique et ordre cistercien, XIIe-XIIIe siècles, Rennes, Presses Universitaires de Rennes, 2012, ISBN 978-2-7535-2051-6.

== See also ==
- Basque señoríos
