= Basauri =

- Municipality
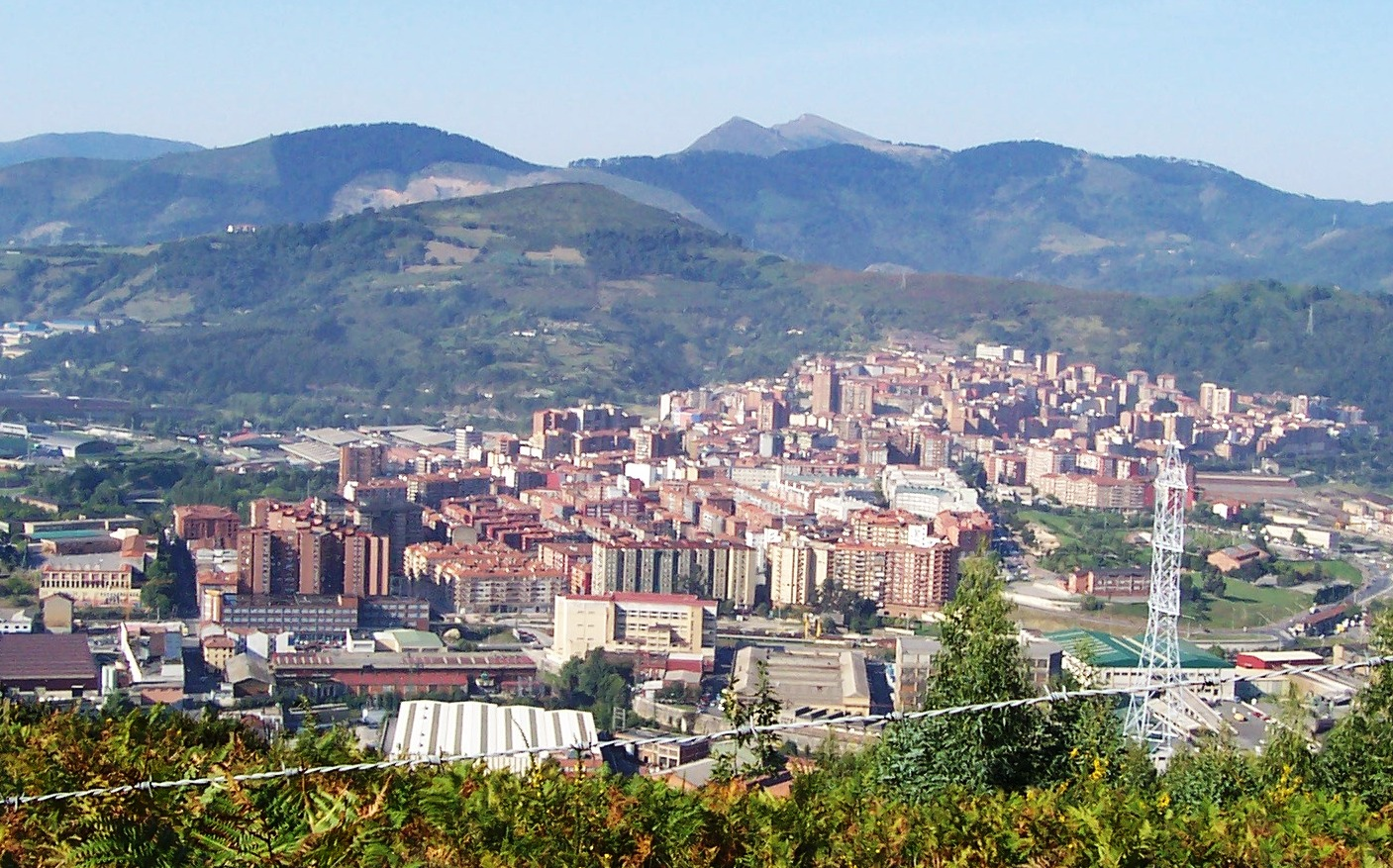

- Flag Coat of arms

- Location of Basauri within the Basque Country Location of Basauri within Spain
- Coordinates: 43°14′12″N 02°53′24″W
- Country: Spain
- Autonomous community: Basque Country
- Province: Biscay
- Comarca: Greater Bilbao
- Founded: 1510

Government
  - Type: Mayor-Council
  - Alcalde: Asier Iragorri (PNV)

Area
  - Municipality: 7.01 km^{2} (2.71 sq mi)

Population (2025-01-01)
  - Municipality: 40,274
  - Density: 5,750/km^{2} (14,900/sq mi)
  - Metro: 910,578
- Demonym: Basauritarra
- Time zone: UTC+1 (CET)
  - Summer (DST): UTC+2 (CEST)
- Postal code: 48970
- Dialing code: +34 94
- Official language(s): Basque, Spanish
- Website: Official website

Basauri is a major municipality of Biscay, in the Basque Country, an Autonomous Community in northern Spain.

The town is a part of the Greater Bilbao conurbation, being only a few kilometers south of Bilbao. It is an industrial town with monuments such as the tower house of Ariz. It is home to the province's only prison, located where the Nervión and Ibaizabal rivers meet. The municipality had a population of 40,589 in 2019.

== Geography ==
Basauri is located in the metropolitan region of Greater Bilbao, on both sides of the river Nervión and the lower valley of the Nervión and the Ibaizabal. Basauri is located at the confluence of the two, the longest rivers in Biscay, forming a small river plain (on the border with Etxebarri) on which a series of meanders have been built, now mostly occupied by industrial facilities. Basauri is also the point at which roads coming from Orduña-Urduña and Durango meet, following the course of the two rivers. The neighborhood of Bidebieta ('two roads' in Basque) takes its name from this meeting.

From the river area where the municipality originated, the land rises gradually, culminating in the Malmasín mountain (361 m), on the border with Arrigorriaga.

=== Bordering towns ===
Basauri is bordered on the north by Bilbao, Etxebarri and Galdakao, on the south and west by Arrigorriaga and on the east by Galdakao and Zaratamo.

=== Neighbourhoods ===
Neighbourhoods
| Abaroa | Ariz | Arizgoiti (capital) |
| Atxikorre | Atxukarro | Artunduaga |
| Azbarren | Basozelai | Benta (Arizgain) |
| Bidebieta | Bizkotzalde (Beaskoetxealde) | Errekalde |
| Finaga (Pinaga) | Ibarguen | Ibarre |
| Kalero (Kareaga) | Matadero (Gaztañabaltza) | Luzarre |
| Pozokoetxe | San Miguel (Elexalde) | Sarratu |
| Soloarte | Solobarria | Ugarte |
| Uribarri | Urbi | Uriarte |
| Zabalandi | | |

Districts
| Ariz | Arizgoiti | Basozelai |
| Bentagoiko | Berriotxoa-Soloarte | Careaga (Kareaga) |
| El Calero (Kareaga goikoa) | Estación (Bidebieta) | Hernán Cortés |
| Matadero (Gaztañabaltza) | Pozokoetxe | San Miguel (Elexalde) |
| San Pedro (Arizgoiti) | Urbi | Virgen de Begoña |
Correct form «Basauri-Name of district»

=== Climate ===
Basauri has a warm and humid oceanic climate. Rainfall is evenly distributed throughout the year with no particular rainy season. Temperatures are moderate throughout the year, with small thermal fluctuations.

Climate data for Basauri
| Month | Jan | Feb | Mar | Apr | May | Jun | Jul | Aug | Sep | Oct | Nov | Dec | Year |
|---|---|---|---|---|---|---|---|---|---|---|---|---|---|
| Mean daily maximum °C (°F) | 13.2 (55.8) | 14.5 (58.1) | 15.9 (60.6) | 16.8 (62.2) | 20.1 (68.2) | 22.6 (72.7) | 25.2 (77.4) | 25.5 (77.9) | 24.4 (75.9) | 20.8 (69.4) | 16.4 (61.5) | 14.0 (57.2) | 19.1 (66.4) |
| Daily mean °C (°F) | 9.0 (48.2) | 9.8 (49.6) | 10.8 (51.4) | 11.9 (53.4) | 15.1 (59.2) | 17.6 (63.7) | 20.0 (68.0) | 20.3 (68.5) | 18.8 (65.8) | 15.8 (60.4) | 12.0 (53.6) | 10.0 (50.0) | 14.3 (57.7) |
| Mean daily minimum °C (°F) | 4.7 (40.5) | 5.1 (41.2) | 5.7 (42.3) | 7.1 (44.8) | 10.1 (50.2) | 12.6 (54.7) | 14.8 (58.6) | 15.2 (59.4) | 13.2 (55.8) | 10.8 (51.4) | 7.6 (45.7) | 6.0 (42.8) | 9.4 (48.9) |
| Average precipitation mm (inches) | 126 (5.0) | 97 (3.8) | 94 (3.7) | 124 (4.9) | 90 (3.5) | 64 (2.5) | 62 (2.4) | 82 (3.2) | 74 (2.9) | 121 (4.8) | 141 (5.6) | 116 (4.6) | 1,195 (47.0) |
| Average precipitation days | 13 | 11 | 11 | 13 | 12 | 8 | 7 | 8 | 9 | 11 | 12 | 12 | 128 |
| Mean monthly sunshine hours | 86 | 97 | 128 | 128 | 160 | 173 | 188 | 179 | 157 | 123 | 93 | 78 | 1,584 |
Source: Agencia Estatal de Meteorología, Aena

== Demographics ==
Several elements influenced the strong growth experienced by Basauri in the 20th century. Being a communications hub was a very important factor. Its proximity to the mines of Ollargan, Morro and Miravilla, and those of the Basauri-Galdakao Group, caused an increase in the municipality's population. The conversion of the mills into a baking industry also contributed to this increase. However, the element that most contributed to the population development was the installation in 1892 of the first major factory, "La Basconia", an iron and steelworks.

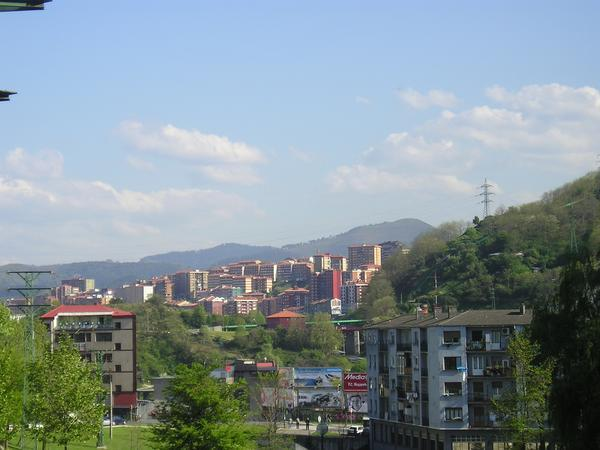
Basauri from Bolueta

The rapid growth that the municipality underwent made its population multiply by 24.6 between 1900 and 1975. The largest population increases started in the 1950s with the installation of new industries, creating a population growth of 97% between 1950 and 1960. This continued in the next decade with an increase of 80%.

| Year | 1900 | 1910 | 1920 | 1930 | 1940 | 1950 | 1960 | 1970 | 1980 | 1990 | 2000 | 2001 | 2003 | 2007 | 2009 | 2012 |
| Population | 1,989 | 3,456 | 5,194 | 9,444 | 10,405 | 11,626 | 22,991 | 41,558 | 55,648 | 50,940 | 47,376 | 46,669 | 45,346 | 43,250 | 42,657 | 41,971 |

In 1984 a slow but progressive population decline began, although it had already been in decline since 1979, when the peak population of 55,648 inhabitants was reached, due to the industrial crisis. According to Spain's National Statistics Institute, the population of Basauri was 41,971 in 2012.

== History ==
Basauri became independent from Arrigorriaga around 1510. 1510 is the official date, although there is no document to verify that any meetings were held between the mayors of the two towns in that year. Basauri was not represented at the General Assembly of Guernica until 1858. Thereafter, it remained the largest population center and municipality in the district of San Miguel de Basauri until 1902, when the transfer of the town hall to Arizgoiti was approved. This was an area with a growing population, equidistant from the two furthest apart points of the municipality, Finaga and San Miguel.

Basauri was up to the end of the 19th century a predominantly rural town, until the arrival of the Basconia factory and with it the industrialization of the town, which went in 50 years from a few thousand inhabitants to 55,000 in 1978. Thousands of families from all regions of Spain provided Basauri with new people and buildings, radically changing its image and urban landscape.

== Toponymy ==
The name Basauri comes from Basque and means 'town in the forest.' It comprises two elements, Basa (from basoa), meaning 'forest' and uri (a Biscay variant of hiri), meaning 'city'. The town of Bajauri in the County of Treviño derives its name from the same roots.

Toponyms in Basauri include Ariz, Arizgoiti, Arizgain and Arizbarren (Azbarren) Basozelai, Etxerre, Sarratu, Urbi, Bizkotxalde (Beaskoetxealde) Pozokoetxe, Pagobieta, Iruaretxeta, Artundoaga, Abaroa, Gaztañabaltza, Uriarte, Errekalde, Lapatza, Arteaga, Arteagagoitia, Uribarri, Kalero, Bidebieta, Soloarte, Ugarte, Kantarazarra, Iturrigorri, Elexalde. Bidebieta appears as Dos Caminos (Two Roads) at the train station, resulting in a popular misconception that this was the original name of the town. The district now called Kalero was originally known as Calero. Although some authors believe this to be a Castilian translation of Kareaga, its name refers to the fact that a holding of limestone for the manufacture of lime was located in this area; such places are called 'Calero' in Spanish. There are two areas or neighborhoods called Kareaga: Kareaga Goikoa and Kareaga Behekoa and now called 'El Calero', since both areas had lime plants.

== Festivities ==
The festival of Faustus the Labourer (San Fausto) on 13 October celebrates the patron saint of the municipality.

Basauri's festivities
| Festival | Location | Date |
| St Isidore | Benta | May 15 |
| St Martin of Finaga | Finaga | May 21 |
| St John | Pozokoetxe, Basozelai | June 24 |
| - | Kalero | first weekend of September |
| St Michael | San Miguel | September 29 |
| St Faustus the Labourer (patron saint) | Basauri | October 13 |

Virtually every major neighborhood in Basauri celebrates its own festivities each year, but the most popular festivals in the town are those held in honor of St Faustus the Labourer. Symbols of the festival include a local character, the Escarabillera, and zurracapote, the typical drink, which is prepared by the fifteen crews belonging to the cultural association Herriko Taldeak, served to participants in a jug. Zurracapote is a drink similar to sangria, made with red wine, lemon, cinnamon, liquor, sugar and condiments.

The Escarabillera is a character based on the women and men who, in Basauri (as in many other municipalities) went, in times of great need at the beginning of the 20th century, to the tracks where the steam trains ran or to the dumps of the foundry companies (La Basconia) in search of coal that had not been entirely burnt (called escarabilla). This coal was used for cooking in old cast iron cookers. Similarly, coal was used as asphalt on many of the streets and lanes of Basauri in the early 20th century. The escarabillera walks from the start of the festival until the end, when it is released into the air attached to balloons with a message written in several languages, with the hope that someone will recover it. Although in many cases it does not return, on one occasion it reached Prague, where one of the crews travelled in order to retrieve it.

== Economy ==
Until the industrial transformation of the late 19th century, Basauri was a purely agricultural area where corn was grown and pasture for cattle and sheep were harvested, and there were some flour mills. Faced with the massive development of industry and housing, the agricultural sector has gradually receded to near extinction.

From the end of the 19th century, its location near Bilbao, its industrial area, and its role as a crossroads in the middle and upper valley of the Nervión and Ibaizábal resulted in the arrival of both industry and large numbers of migrant workers, making Basauri a mostly industrial town. Maintaining the industrial population, the services sector has grown significantly in recent years. The active population of Basauri is 20,265 people, of whom 21.3% were unemployed in 2013.

== Communications ==
Basauri is 1.24 miles (2 km) from Bilbao. This proximity has given the town a good communications system. The provincial capital can be reached via the A-8, the Bilbao-Orduña road in the south and the Bilbao-Galdakao (N-634) road in the north. The railway lines of Renfe and Euskotren Trena cross the town and make several stops in Basauri.

The underground (Bilbao Metro) also has two stops: one in the neighborhood of Ariz (inaugurated on February 28, 2011) and one in the neighborhood of Arizgoiti (November 11, 2011), called Basauri. Ariz and Basauri are the two last stations on Line 2 of the Bilbao Metro.

There is also a free shuttle bus connecting the Basauri underground station with the neighborhood of San Miguel de Basauri.

The modification of the San Miguel shuttle bus to provide more services to Basauri is being considered.

== Culture ==
- Since 2005, the International Festival of Animated Film Basauri-Bizkaia (Animabasauri-Animasbasque) has been held annually. Antzokia Social theatre is the venue of the main project, together with other projection centers scattered around the region.
- In 2008 the 23rd National Congress of Vexillology was held in Basauri, organized by the council and the Spanish Society of Vexillology.
- The La Sexta series Qué vida más triste ('What a Sad Life') is set in Basauri.

== Administration and politics ==
Asier Iragorri Basaguren of the Basque Nationalist Party has been the mayor of Basauri since 2019. The 2023 Spanish local elections produced the following results in the municipality:

City of Basauri
| Party | Votes | Seats |
| Basque Nationalist Party | 6,958 | 9 |
| Socialist Party of the Basque Country–Basque Country Left | 4,046 | 5 |
| EH Bildu-Bildu | 3,474 | 4 |
| Elkarrekin Podemos (EP)-Ezker Anitza-Basauri Bai | 1,443 | 2 |
| People's Party of the Basque Country | 1,347 | 1 |

== Notable people ==
- Jon Arretxe, writer
- Erlantz Gamboa, writer, LH Confidential winner
- Javi Conde, athlete, Paralympic medallist
- Concha Espinosa, FETE trade unionist
- Joxean Fernández, Matxin, Saunier Duval cycling team director
- Joseba Garmendia, footballer
- Agustín Ibarrola, painter and sculptor
- Naroa Intxausti Bolunburu, soprano
- Rubén Ontiveros, Borja Pérez, Joseba Caballero (Qué vida más triste TV Show)
- Agustín 'Piru' Gaínza, footballer and trainer
- Juan Solís Godoy, Taekwondo athlete and Olympic Games medallist
- Óscar Vales Varela, footballer
- Marta López, gymnast
- Francisco Javier Yeste Navarro, footballer
- Juanan Morales, basketball player
- Jesús Lizaso, sculptor
- Itziar Ituño, actor
- Sergio Vez, curling player
