= Malmasín =

Mountain in the Basque Autonomous Community

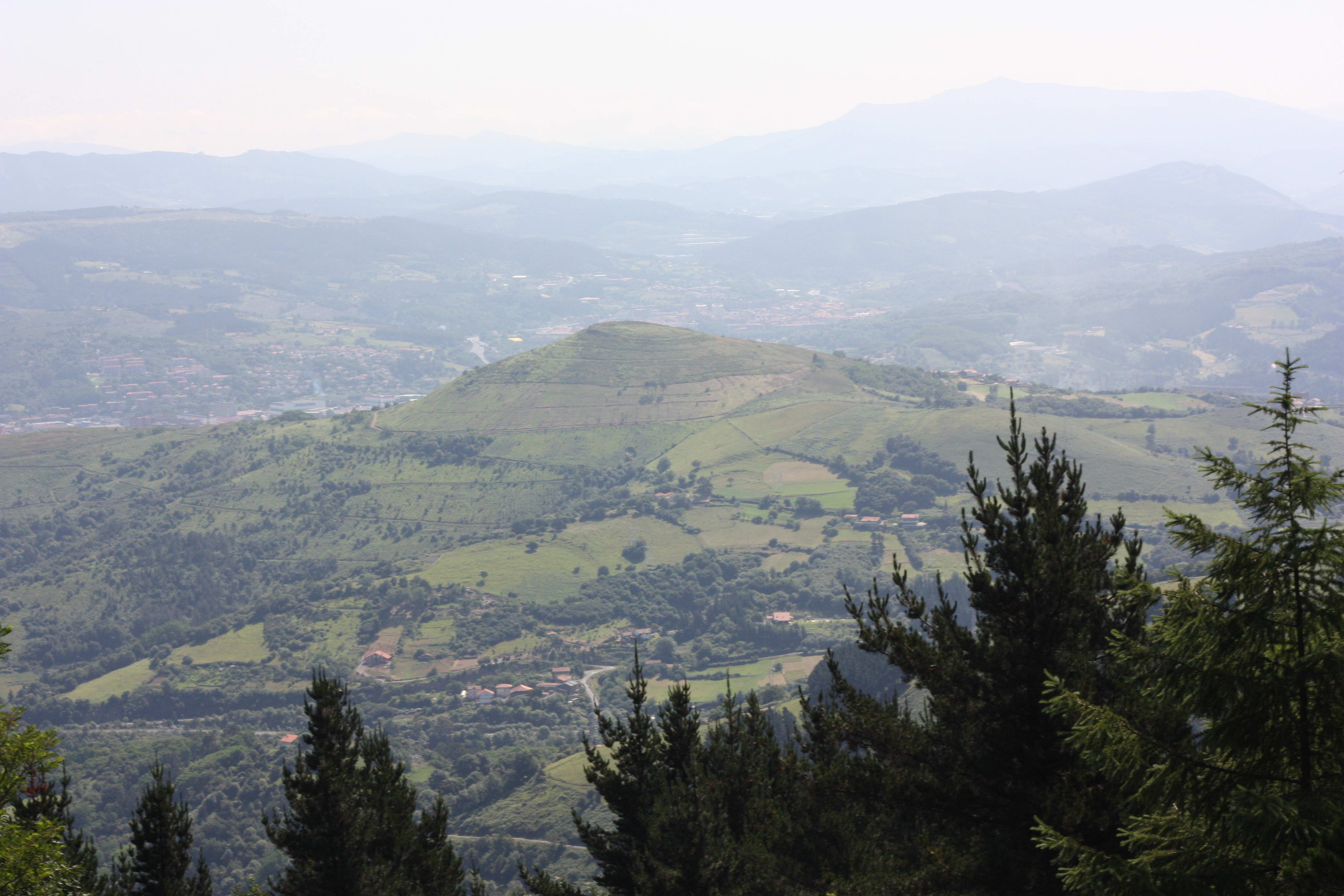
- View of Bilbao from Malmasín

Highest point
- Elevation: 360 m (1,180 ft)
- Prominence: 210 m (690 ft)
- Coordinates: 43.228333°N 2.901389°W

Geography
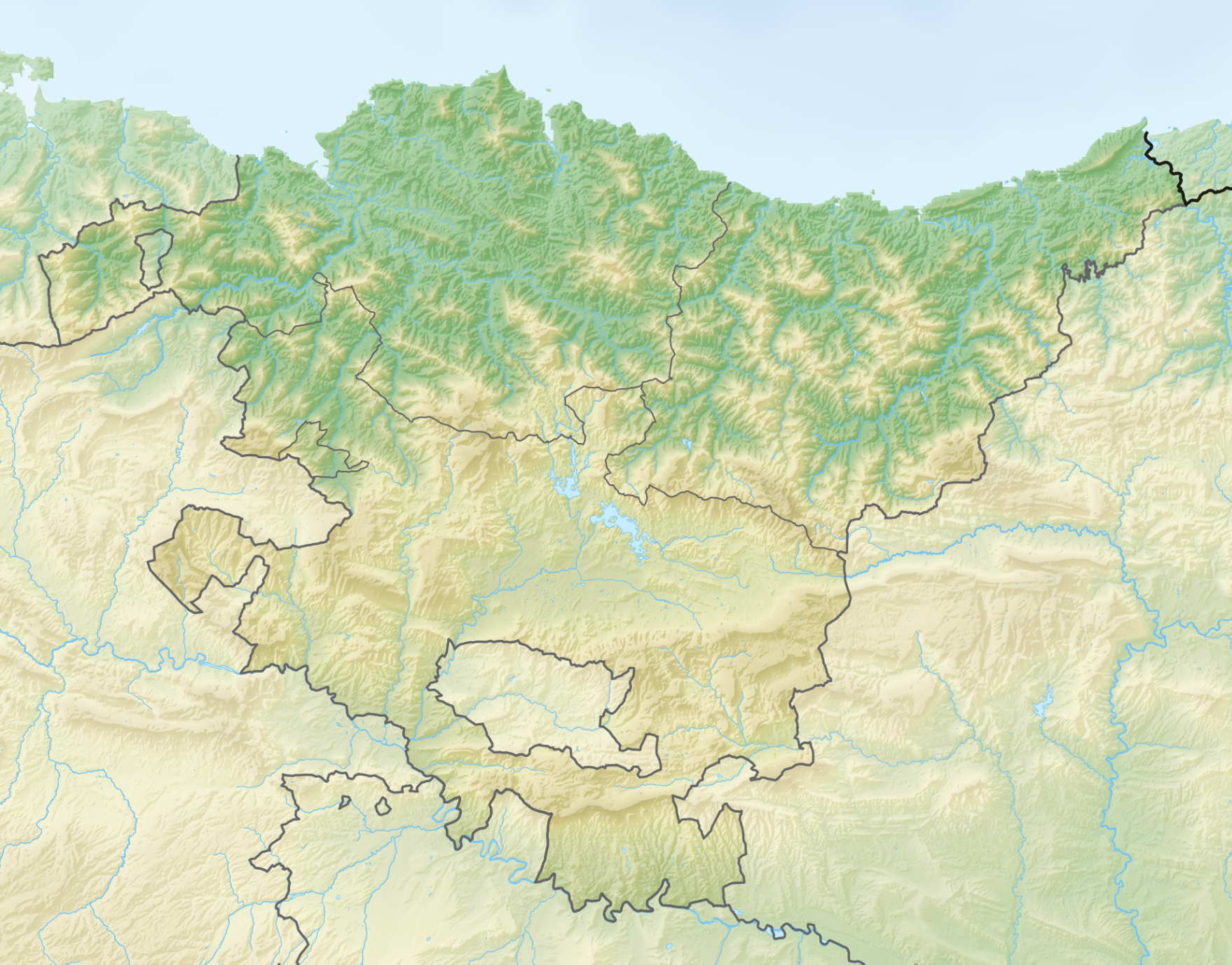
- Location within the Basque Country
- Location: Arrigorriaga, Biscay, Basque Autonomous Community, Spain
- Parent range: Basque Mountains

Malmasín is a mountain located in the Basque Autonomous Community, between Arrigorriaga, Basauri and Bilbao.
