= Esteban de Garibay =

- Esteban Garibai
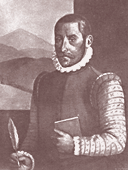
- Born: 9 March 1533; Mondragón
- Died: 1599 or 1600; Madrid

Esteban de Garibay y Zamalloa, sometimes rendered as Çamalloa, was a Spanish Basque historian and writer.

== Biography ==
Garibay was born in the Basque town of Mondragon and initially trained to be a monk, although he left and was married later on. He studied at the University of Oñati, which was founded a few years after his birth and was the only university in Spanish Basque country, although he did not graduate. Garibay traveled widely throughout the Iberian Peninsula, including places such as Portugal and Andalusia in addition to eminent Spanish cities such as Seville, Toledo, and Madrid. He involved himself in the political life of these areas and, as a result, was able to write a collective history of Spain itself, which began with Creation and ending with King Pelayo.

He traveled to Antwerp to publish his Compendio historial at Christophe Plantin's publishing house between 1570 and 1572. He went into debt and eventually became bankrupt as a result, traveling back through France. He was also widowed in 1572, and thereafter he dedicated himself to genealogical topics. After traveling widely, Garibay settled in Toledo and remarried in 1574 to a 15-year-old noble named Luisa de Montoya. Through his connections to nobility, Garibay obtained an audience with Philip II in April 1575, as Philip was intrigued with Garibay's writings on court genealogy and dynastic rights. From 1585, he performed duties for the royal family, and, in 1592, he was officially made the royal court chronicler. However, he had been accused of using his position solely to give credence to his earlier writings.

In 1594, what is thought to have been apoplexy impaired his mental faculties, although his last historical work entitled Genealogical Illustrations of the Catholic Kings of Spain was ready in time to be published. His final will was issued on 17 October 1599, shortly before his death, and in it he desired to be buried in his hometown of Mondragón. He also produced a text entitled Discurso de mi vida (Story of my life) in either 1598 or 1599.

Garibay died in 1599. Among his biological descendents was a Franciscan cleric from his first marriage, and several from his second marriage. The latter consisted of a widow and three other children who were living with Miguel de Cervantes when the latter was jailed on suspicion of being involved with the death of a nobleman named Gaspar de Ezpeleta in 1605.

Influence on Basque studies

Although Garibay's writings had counter-Reformation, national-Catholic, and Spanish royalist tendencies, he was among a few writers of his time who have come to be seen as forerunners to a revived sense of Basque national identity. Through his political connections, he tried to help the Province of Guipúzcoa recover its former status as a "kingdom", although this attempt failed because he did not have the backing of the General Assemblies. He also collected songs and proverbs from the oral tradition of his native land. His 1571 Compendio historial records the name used by his people for their own language as enusquera, which is thought to be related to modern-day euskara. In the Compendio historial, he also supported an old myth that the Biblical figure Tubal was the patriarchal ancestor of Basques, in addition to arguing for supposed ancient boundaries of the Basque country which were far larger than today's.
