= DF27 =

DF27 or DF-27 may refer to:

- Dongfeng 27, a long-range ballistic missile
- Haplogroup R-DF27, a Y-chromosome haplogroup
