= Arrigorriaga =

- Municipality
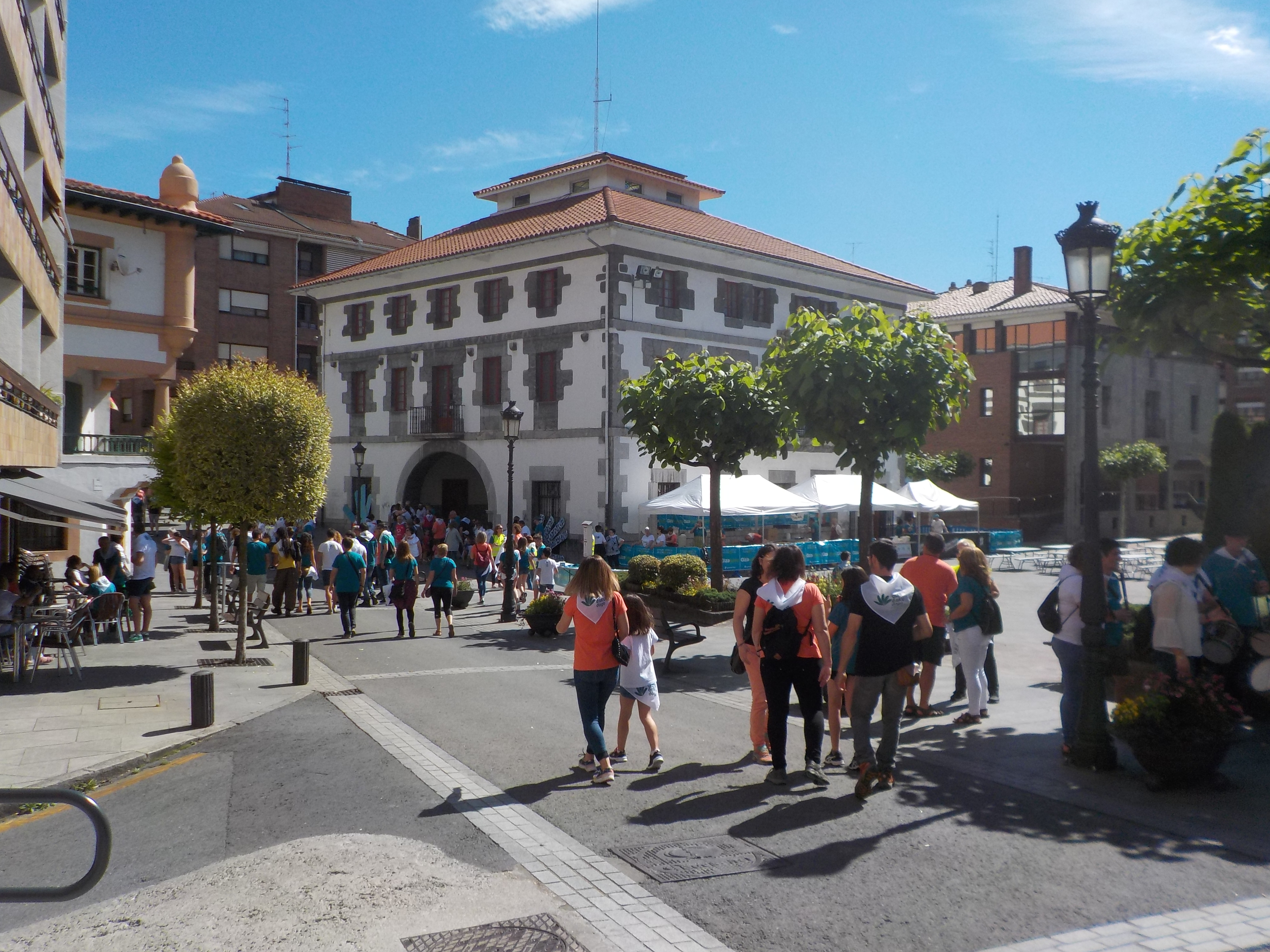
- The Argala Square in Arrigorriaga.

- Flag Coat of arms

- Location of Arrigorriaga within the Basque Country
- Coordinates: 43°12′28″N 2°53′10″W
- Autonomous community: Basque Country
- Province: Bizkaia
- Shire: Greater Bilbao
- Established: 840

Government
  - Mayor: Asier Albizua (PNV)

Area
  - Total: 16.36 km^{2} (6.32 sq mi)
- Elevation: 58 m (190 ft)
- Highest elevation: 585 m (1,919 ft)
- Lowest elevation: 35 m (115 ft)

Population (2025-01-01)
  - Total: 11,939
  - Density: 729.8/km^{2} (1,890/sq mi)
- Demonym: Arrigorriagatar
- Time zone: UTC+1 (CET)
  - Summer (DST): UTC+2 (CEST)
- Postal code: 48480
- Official language(s): Basque and Spanish
- Website: Official website

Arrigorriaga is a town and municipality located in the province of Bizkaia, in the Basque Autonomous Community, Spain. Arrigorriaga is located 7 km south of Bilbao and is part of Bilbao's metropolitan area. Its official population at the 2019 census was 12,160 inhabitants living on a land area of 16.36 square kilometres (6.32 sq mi).

It is conterminous with Bilbao and Basauri in the north, with Ugao-Miraballes and Zeberio in the south, with Zaratamo in the east and with Arrankudiaga and Alonsotegi in the west.

== Place name ==
Arrigorriaga may be translated from Basque language as 'Place of red stones'. "Harri" ('stone'), "gorri" ('red') and the locative suffix "-aga" or also 'Place of naked stones', as "gorri" is a polysemic term that also means "naked, bare, incarnated". There exists a well-known legend that explains the origins of this name as "Place of red stones". This story begins in the 15th century, because it was written for the first time by the Basque chronicler Lope García de Salazar in his book Las Bienandanzas e Fortunas. As the tale says, Arrigorriaga was called Padura in the ancient times (marsh in Basque) and the legendary Battle of Padura in which people from Biscay and people from León fought each other took place. When the battle finished, won by people from Biscay, Padura was renamed as Arrigorriaga, because so much blood was spilled, that the stones were painted red. The story was recovered and used by Sabino Arana in the 19th century as an instrument of Basque people's exaltation. Apart from this "romantic" thesis, there exist other, more prosaic theses, that confirm that the name has its origins in the iron mines that were in the locality. According to these theses, the name of the town could have been because of the iron ores that painted red the mount Ollargan or also, to the surface without any vegetation that was surrounded by, because of the mining operations nearby, "Place of naked stones".

== History ==
Anteiglesia de la Merindad de Uribe, occupied the seat number 39 in the Juntas Generales de Guernica. Until 1876 the Church of Arrigorriaga had great importance in the region, taking on account inside it the municipalities of Arrancudiaga, Basauri, Zarátamo and Alonsótegi. By this year, with the abolition of the jurisdictions and after diverse lawsuits, ended up disengaging. Alonsótegi self constituted as an independent church in the 16th century. Basauri separated from Arrigorriaga in 1510 or, at least, that is the date taken as the most official one, when the parish of San Miguel Arcángel was built, because there does not exist any document to verify that a meeting between two localities' mayors took place that day. Since then, the community was denominated as church of San Miguel of Basauri. The independence of Basauri was unilateral; it didn't have the approval of Arrigorriaga and neither had the permission of the General Juntas of Guernica to take their corresponding seat in them, they didn't manage to achieve it until 1858.

The incoming origins from the legend and the myth, without letting even the name free ("Place of red stones") of this "fable". This legend has many different versions reaffirmed by some and refuted by others. But which is true, is that the myth, legend or story, as you want to call it, of the "Battle of Padura" has produced hundreds of pages in Basque Country's history and literature. The central core of this tale says that by the year 870 or 888 of our age, in that place named Padura (where Arrigorriaga would be located), the armies of the Lord of Biscay, the first according to the history, defeated in a bloody battle the people from León, led by the prince Ordoño, successor to the crown of León and son of the king Alfonso "El Magno". Arrigorriaga would have its origins in the spilt blood that covered the fighting ground.

Other interpretations say that the origin of this term is in the iron veins that could be found in Ollargan mount, and that had given a generic name to the entire municipality. In any case, the first historical news referring to Arrigorriaga are dated in the 12th century, and relate to the incorporation of Arrigorriaga's parish, Santa María Magdalena, to the Monasterio de San Salvador de Oña in 1107 (gathered by the historian Iturriza in his work).

In 1300, mount Ollargan with its iron mines was given to the villa of Bilbao in the town charter granted by D. Diego López de Haro. Few years after, in 1375, the parishioners of this church managed to get from the infant D. Juan, to the Lord of Biscay, the belonging to the jurisdiction of the villa. This measure allowed their inhabitants to be protected from the arbitrariness and abuses of the bigger relatives.

In 1783, led by the mayor José de Arana, the square we know nowadays was inaugurated. In former days, it was located where nowadays Bar padura is located, in front of the town hall. The reason for this placement change was the building of the new Royal Way from Bilbao to Castilla which halved the former public square, preventing, because of its narrowness, the neighbours performing the common unfolding of threshing.

During the two Carlists Wars last century, Arrigorriaga hold some important battles, both occurred at the Moyordín bridge, which linked the town with Zarátamo. The first happened 11 September 1835 and the second, in May 1872.

In 1907, the bridge of Ugertza was built to facilitate communication between Arrigorriaga and the central core. In 1920, the east side of the church, occupied with the old cemetery, was transformed into a cinematographic room called Salón Festivo; this name still lasts today. In 1928 schools were built in the square, before that. there were in Paseo Urgoiti street in 1915, in the context of buildings that the municipality knew in the early century (bridge of Ugarza, public fountains, Ateneo Cultural, ...). Until then, entering the school was managed by the church and it was carried out in specific particular buildings hired with that goal.

Municipal elections in 1931 were won by the anti-monarchy party formed by different left political parties with numerous affiliated people in the municipality because of its industrial and mining condition, with hundreds of workers. The corporatism in the region took place before war with the creation of many different associations of every kind, political and social. The war had as main stage mount Malmasín nearby, that hold many fights between gudaris brigades or soldiers led by the Basque Government and Franco's armies, these entered in the location 16 June 1937. Half of the population (2.000 people) run away, being able to return after.

2 November 1940, town hall suffered a fire, losing a great part of the Municipal Archives. It was built in 1777.

Since the floods in 1983, the principal core of the old town has a newer aspect. The respect for old buildings and entertainment places has allowed to rebuild areas sentimentally attached to local history and the old paper mill, nowadays Lonbo (Lonbo Aretoa, sport zone, entertainment zone and children's playground), access to Santo Cristo, Mendikosolobarrena natural park and Mintegi (the old Dinamita park).

Land balance has been based on the wish of giving the neighbors a maximum level of habitability, life standards and environmental respect.

== General data ==
This industrial population has a lot of value due to its situation, because it is only 9 km from the capital city and it is one of the main transit points of the principal communication ways between Bilbao and Vitoria and the Spanish plateau.

Its geographical situation also had a big influence in the increase of the population and that way, it has reached more than 12,000 inhabitants nowadays.

== Geography ==
Arrigorriaga is a locality physically divided in two important and distant cores. On the one hand, there is the central part of the city on the bank of river Nervión. On the other hand, there is the neighbourhood of Abusu-La Peña, also on the river bank, but between the municipalities of Basauri and Bilbao. Near the park of Malmasin.

=== Climate ===
Climatological Parameters for Arrigorriaga
| Month | Jan | Feb | Mar | Apr | May | Jun | Jul | Aug | Sep | Oct | Nov | Dec | Year |
|---|---|---|---|---|---|---|---|---|---|---|---|---|---|
| Average maximum temperature (°C) | 11 | 12 | 13 | 14 | 18 | 20 | 23 | 23 | 22 | 18 | 14 | 12 | 16 |
| Average minimum temperature (°C) | 2 | 3 | 3 | 5 | 8 | 10 | 12 | 13 | 11 | 8 | 5 | 4 | 7 |
| Average Monthly Precipitation (mm) | 126 | 97 | 94 | 124 | 90 | 64 | 62 | 82 | 74 | 121 | 141 | 116 | 1195 |

== Artistic heritage ==
=== Parish of Santa María Magdalena ===
Its foundation dates back to the 9th century, besides actually it is nothing left from its primitive building. It is 106 feet long and 42 tall and it is covered by a single wooden dome. The image taking place in the altar has a great quality.

=== Hermitages ===
- San Pedro de Abrisqueta. It shows some pre-Romanesque styles and is the oldest in Biscay (early 12th century). It has a rectangular nave which is 7,34 x 5,25 m, and an apse of barrel vault. The access gates, oriented to the west, has a rounded arch, and in the right jamb we can find a possibly Visigoth design. There is a rounded arch in the southern wall half covered, that could have been the main access before. Over this arch is possible to see two handmade medallions that represent human figures. Reused as building materials, inside it have been found remains of Roman funeral steles and a block of sandstone with pre-Romanic signs. Also presented at the apse's window.
- Santo Cristo de Landaederraga. The first building dates back to 1655, however, it has suffered diverse reconstructions. Its floor has an irregular figure, forming an amputated cross. It has great sobriety and its big dimensions must be highlighted.

=== Imagery ===
- Talla de Sta. M.ª Magdalena. Created by Nicolás Teite in 1705. It is a wooden carve with a highly artistic value. Its expressiveness must be highlighted.
- Tallas de San Francisco Javier y San Ignacio de Loiola. They are two wooden carves located in the high altar of the Parish of María Magdalena. Created around 1693.
- Talla de Cristo Crucificado. Located in the hermitage of Santo Cristo, it was made by 1655.

== Municipal elections 2015 ==
After the 2015 elections, the configuration of the town hall is the following:

Municipal elections 2015
| Party | Councilors |
| Basque Nationalist Party | 7 |
| EH Bildu | 5 |
| Arrigorriaga Gara | 3 |
| PSOE | 2 |

== Notable people ==
- Simón Lecue (1912): international football player
- Soladrero (1913): international football player
- José Miguel Beñarán, Argala (1949–1978): member of ETA
- Txato Olabarri (?–1936), gudari
- Armando Astarloa Solaun (1948): writer, lawyer and economist
- Alberto Berasategui (1973): professional tennis player
- Mikel Rico (1984): professional football player
- Vicente Fatrás (1872): politician and cyclist
- Mikel Cuadra (1961): professional basketball player (Saski Baskonia)
- Mikel Azcona (1996): racing driver
