= Origin of the Basques =

Hypotheses of Basque ethnic origins

The origin of the Basques and the Basque language is a controversial topic that has given rise to numerous hypotheses. Modern Basque, a descendant or close relative of Aquitanian and Proto-Basque, is the only pre-Indo-European language that is extant in western Europe. The Basques have therefore long been supposed to be a remnant of a pre-Indo-European population of Europe.

The main hypotheses about the origin of the Basques are:

- Native origin, the mainstream theory, according to which the Basque language would have developed over the millennia entirely between the north of the Iberian Peninsula and the current south of France, without the possibility of finding any kind of relationship between the Basque language and other modern languages in other regions.
- Basque-Iberism theorizes the existence of a kinship between the Basque and the Iberian language, and therefore between their speakers.
- Caucasian origin theorizes that the Basque language and the languages of the Caucasus may have a direct relation, explaining why they share some linguistic typologies absent in the Indo-European languages.

== Native origin theory ==
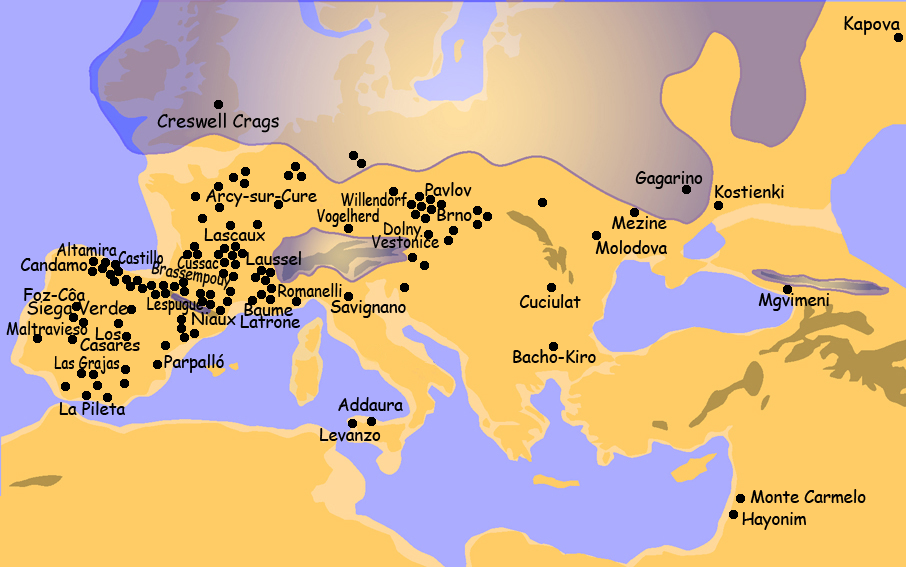
Distribution of Paleolithic settlements in Europe.

Stephen Oppenheimer has proposed that from c. 16,000 BC, the warmer climate allowed the expansion of proto-Basque groups to Britain and Ireland, and that today's inhabitants of Britain and Ireland descend from the Basques.

In 2008, the Finnish linguist Kalevi Wiik proposed that the current Basque language is the remainder of a group of "Basque languages" that were spoken in the Paleolithic throughout western Europe and that retreated with the progress of the Indo-European languages. Wiik states that his theory coincides with the homogeneous distribution of the Haplogroup R1b in Atlantic Europe.

Ludomir R. Lozny states that "Wiik's controversial ideas are rejected by the majority of the scholarly community, but they have attracted the enormous interest of a wider audience."

=== Paleogenetic investigations ===
In May 2012, the National Geographic Society Genographic Project released a study that showed through detailed DNA analysis of samples from French and Spanish Basque regions that Basques share unique genetic patterns that distinguish them from the surrounding non-Basque populations. The results of the study clearly support the hypothesis of a partial genetic continuity of contemporary Basques with the preceding Paleolithic/Mesolithic settlers of their homeland.

Paleogenetic investigations by the Complutense University of Madrid indicate that the Basque people have a genetic profile coincident with the rest of the European population and that goes back to Prehistoric times. The haplotype of the mitochondrial DNA known as U5 entered in Europe during the Upper Paleolithic and developed varieties as the U8a, native of the Basque Country, which is considered to be Prehistoric, and as the J group, which is also frequent in the Basque population. The works of Alzualde A, Izagirre N, Alonso S, Alonso A, de la Rua C. about mitochondrial DNA of the Human remains found in the Prehistoric graveyard of Alaieta, in Alava, note that there are no differences between these remains and others found across Atlantic Europe.

Studies based on the Y chromosome genetically relate the Basques with the Celtic Welsh, and Irish; Stephen Oppenheimer from the University of Oxford says that the current inhabitants of the British Isles have their origin in the Basque refuge during the last Ice age. Oppenheimer reached this conclusion through the study of correspondences in the frequencies of genetic markers between various European regions. The haplogroup R1b, can be found most frequently in the Basque Country (91%), Wales (89%) and Ireland (81%). The age of subclade which Basque carry, Haplogroup R1b-DF27, "is estimated at ~4,200 years ago, at the transition between the Neolithic and the Bronze Age, when the Y chromosome landscape of Western Europe was thoroughly remodeled. In spite of its high frequency in Basques, Y-STR internal diversity of R1b-DF27 is lower there, and results in more recent age estimates", implying it was brought to the region from elsewhere.

In 2015, a new scientific study of Basque DNA was published which seems to indicate that Basques are descendants of Neolithic farmers who mixed with local hunters before becoming genetically isolated from the rest of Europe for millennia. Mattias Jakobsson from Uppsala University in Sweden analysed genetic material from eight Stone Age human skeletons found in El Portalón Cavern in Atapuerca, northern Spain. These individuals lived between 3,500 and 5,500 years ago, after the transition to farming in southwest Europe. The results show that these early Iberian farmers are the closest ancestors to present-day Basques. The official findings were published in Proceedings of the National Academy of Sciences of the United States of America. "Our results show that the Basques trace their ancestry to early farming groups from Iberia, which contradicts previous views of them being a remnant population that trace their ancestry to Mesolithic hunter-gatherer groups," says Prof. Jakobsson. However, the results also showed that Basques, along with many other Iberian groups, carry both Neolithic farmer ancestry as well as some local mesolithic hunter-gatherer ancestry; showing that "the incoming farmers admixed with local, Iberian hunter-gather groups, a process that continued for at least 2 millennia."

Rather, some 4500 years ago almost all Y-DNA heritage from Iberian admixture of Mesolithic hunter-gatherers and Neolithic farmers was replaced by the lineage of Indo-European herders from the steppe, and the Basque genetic distinctiveness is a result of centuries of low population size, genetic drift, and endogamy. In 2019, a study was published in Science in which a more fine-tuned and deep time-transect of Iberian ancient populations including the Basque were analyzed. From their abstract, it says: "and we reveal that present-day Basques are best described as a typical Iron Age population without the admixture events that later affected the rest of Iberia." This indicates Basques were isolated from admixture with outside groups since at least 1000BC or 3000 years before the present. In Iberia, these later admixture (interbreeding) events were with central European (Celtic), eastern Mediterranean and northern African populations, and genomic ancestry from them are found in all or most present-day Iberian populations, except for the Basque.

=== Linguistics ===
In the field of linguistics, there are two lines of investigation, both based on etymology; one on toponyms, not only in the Basque Country but also in the rest of the Iberian Peninsula and Europe, and the other on the etymology of Basque words.

=== The aizkora controversy ===
Some vasconists have, in the past, suggested that Basque may have several words, all related to tools, that are derived from a word for 'stone', haitz (though this primarily means 'rock, boulder' in modern Basque). These include:

- (h)aizkora 'axe'
- (h)aitzur 'hoe'
- (h)aitzur 'shears'
- (h)aiztur 'tongs'
- aizto 'knife'

Theories regarding the possibility of such a shared root have been put forward by Louis Lucien Bonaparte, Miguel de Unamuno, Julio Caro Baroja and others. One implication of these hypothetical and controversial etymologies was that some aspects of the Basque language had been stable and uninfluenced by other languages since the Stone Age.

However, these etymologies are now doubted by mainstream vasconists. Aizkora has been identified as a loan from the Latin asciola. The root of the remaining terms – based on the Roncalese dialect, which is known for its preservation of historical nasals and has the documented forms antzur, ainzter, aintzur and ainzto – was ainz- and thus the reconstructed root was *ani(t)z or *ane(t)z. There are no traces of such a nasal sound in the word haitz 'rock' (cf. Roncalese aitz).

== Alternative theories ==
=== Basque-Iberism ===
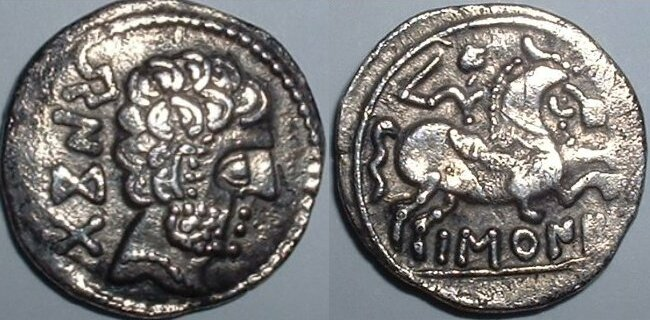
Sides of an Iberian coin with the inscription Baskunes.

The theory of the Basque-Iberism claims that there is a direct relationship between the Basque language and the Iberian language, meaning either that Basque evolved out of the Iberian language, or that its precursor belonged to the same language family. The first author to suggest this theory was Strabo in the 1st century BC (at a time when the Iberian language was still spoken); he asserted that the Iberians and the Aquitanians were similar physically and that they spoke similar languages and had similar customs.

The German linguist Wilhelm von Humboldt proposed, in the early 19th Century, a thesis in which he stated that the Basque people were Iberians, following some studies that he had conducted.

Others claim there is not a direct connection, including Koldo Mitxelena who claims the similarities between Iberian and Basque are attributed solely to the relationship of vicinity, and not to any kinship.

=== Caucasian origin ===
Some researchers have propounded the similarities between the Basque language and the Caucasian languages, especially the Georgian language.

The comparison between the matrilineal and patrilineal DNA of the native peoples from the Basque Country and Georgia has allowed the discovery of significant differences. The hypothesis that related both populations is only based on the typological similarities, which is not an accepted marker of linguistic kinship. These superficial similarities in the linguistic typologies do not seem to accompany a genetic relation at a population level. The possible relation between Basque and the languages of the Caucasus is denied by authors such as Larry Trask, who stated that the comparisons were wrongly made, given the fact that the Basque language was compared with several Caucasian languages at the same time.

=== Old European ===
These theories are based on the Old European hydronymy, assuming that the first inhabitants of Europe spoke a common tongue or languages of the same language family. This theory is not accepted by most linguists, who believe that, in a territory as large as Europe, more than one language had to be spoken.

In January 2003, the Spanish edition of the popular science magazine Scientific American published a study conducted by Theo Vennemann, where he concluded:

Much of the names of settlements, rivers, mountains, valleys and landscapes in Europe would have their origin in Pre-Indo-European languages, specifically the Basque language.

Vennemann:

We do not fall in exaggeration if we say that all the Europeans are Basques.

According to Vennemann, the Proto-Basque language (or a language family from which the Basque language originated) was the linguistic stratum in which the Indo-European languages later settled. He found, among other examples, the Basque words ibai ('river') and ibar ('bottom') to repeat continuously in European rivers, or the word haran ('valley') in toponyms such as Val d'Aran, Arendal, Arundel, Arnach, Arnsberg, Aresburg, Ahrensburg, Aranbach or Arnstein.

The Vennemann theory has been criticized by Basque scholars and it is not accepted by most linguists.

Specifically, Trask, after many pointed critiques of the methods employed, affirmed that Vennemann had found an agglutinative language, but with no relation to the Basque language, and that probably it is simply the Indo-European language, as many other linguistic scholars agree.

Joseba Andoni Lakarra, a researcher of the Proto-Basque language, criticizes the thesis of Vennemann, saying, like Trask, that he identifies modern Basque roots that are not related to the archaic Basque. In the same way, Lakarra says that, despite Basque now being an agglutinative language, there are reasons to believe that previously it was not so.

== Genetic studies ==
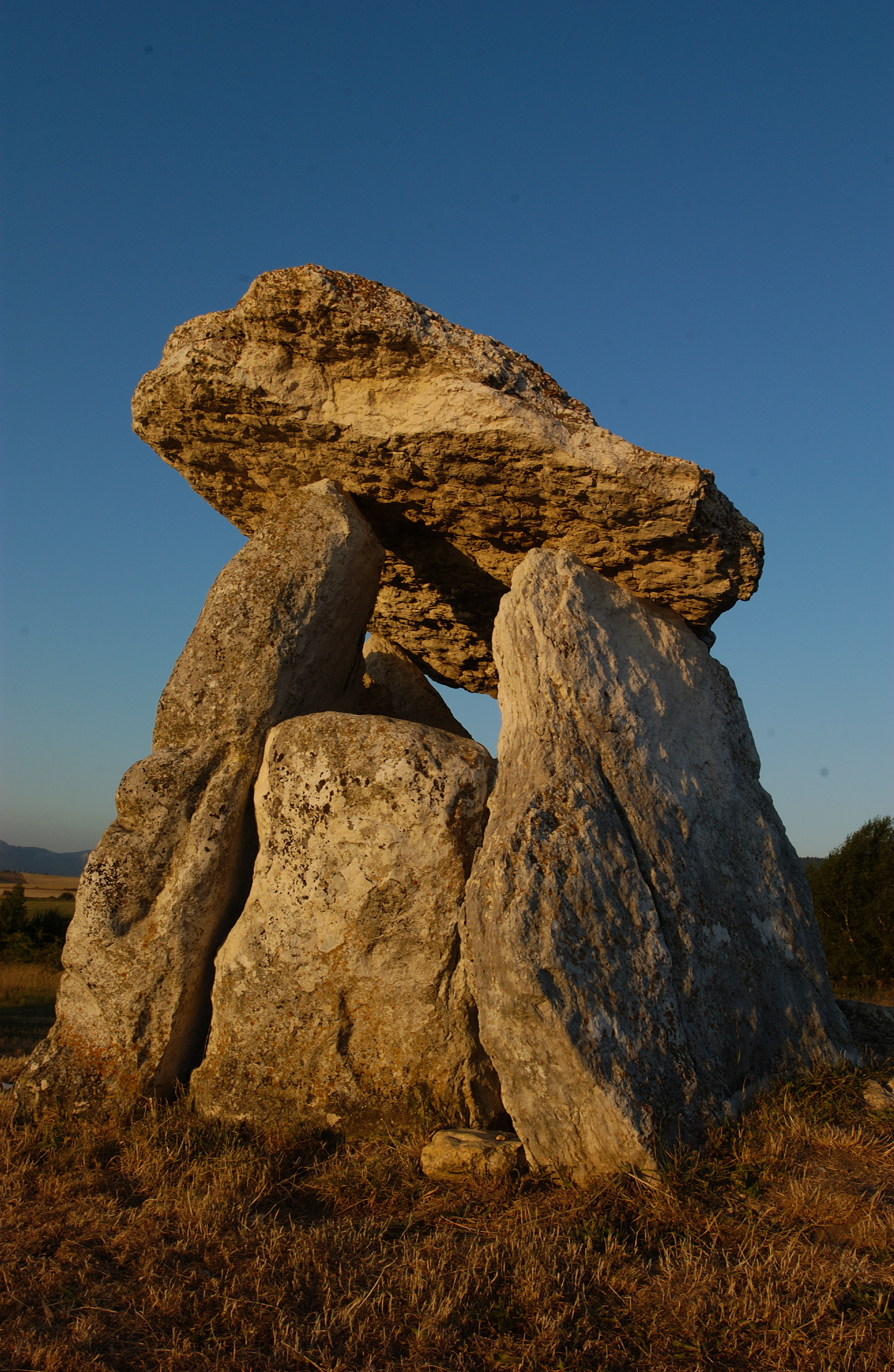
Sorginetxe dolmen next to the stream and cave Lezao, home to legends featuring mythological character Mari

Although they are genetically distinctive in some ways due to isolation, the Basques are still very typically European in their Y-DNA and mtDNA sequences, and in some other genetic loci. These same sequences are widespread throughout the Western half of Europe, especially along the Western fringe of the continent.

Autosomal genetic studies have confirmed that Basques share close genetic ties to other Europeans, especially with Spaniards, who have a common genetic identity of over 70 % with Basques, a homogeneity amongst both their Spanish and French populations, according to high-density SNP genotyping study done in May 2010, and a genomic distinctiveness, relative to other European populations.

Studies of the Y-DNA haplogroups found that on their direct male lineages, the vast majority of modern Basques have a common ancestry with other Western Europeans, namely a marked predominance of Haplogroup R1b-DF27 (70 % according to some). This had initially been theorised to be a Palaeolithic marker. But this theory encountered inconsistencies even prior to the most recent chronological re-evaluations. More recent studies suggest that R1b spread up to Western Europe from southwestern Eurasia in the Neolithic period or later, between 8,000 and 4,000 years ago. The age of the subclade which Basques carry, R1b-DF27, "is estimated at ~4,200 years ago, at the transition between the Neolithic and the Bronze Age, when the Y chromosome landscape of Western Europe was thoroughly remodeled. In spite of its high frequency in Basques, Y-STR internal diversity of R1b-DF27 is lower there, and results in more recent age estimates", implying it was brought to the region from elsewhere. Next to the main lineage R1b, high frequencies of E-V65, associated with the Maghreb, Italy and Spain, were found among Basque autochthonous inhabitants of Álava province (17.3 %), Biscay province (10.9 %), and Gipuzkoa province (3.3 %).

Several ancient DNA samples have been recovered and amplified from the Iberian and Basque region. The collection of mtDNA and Y-DNA haplogroups sampled there differed significantly compared to their modern frequencies. The authors concluded that there is "discontinuity" between ancient locals and modern Basques. While Basques harbour some very archaic mtDNA lineages, they are not of "undiluted Palaeolithic ancestry" but of significantly early Neolithic origin with a connection to the isolate Sardinian people. It appears that some 4,500 years ago almost all Y-DNA heritage from Iberian admixture of Mesolithic hunter-gatherers and Neolithic farmers was replaced by the R1b lineage of herders from the steppe, and the Basque genetic distinctiveness is a result of centuries of low population size, genetic drift, and endogamy.

In 2015, a new scientific study of Basque DNA was published which seems to indicate that Basques are descendants of Neolithic farmers who mixed with local Mesolithic hunters before becoming genetically isolated from the rest of Europe for millennia. Mattias Jakobsson from Uppsala University in Sweden analysed genetic material from eight Stone Age human skeletons found in El Portalón Cavern in Atapuerca, northern Spain. These individuals lived between 3,500 and 5,500 years ago, after the transition to farming in southwest Europe. The results show that these early Iberian farmers are the closest ancestors to present-day Basques. The findings were published in Proceedings of the National Academy of Sciences of the United States of America. According to the study, the "results show that the Basques trace their ancestry to early farming groups from Iberia, which contradicts previous views of them being a remnant population that trace their ancestry to Mesolithic hunter-gatherer groups." Still these early Neolithic farmer ancestors of the Basques did mix with local southwestern hunter-gatherers, and "the proportion of hunter gatherer-related admixture into early farmers also increased over the course of two millennia." This admixed group was also found to be ancestral to other modern-day Iberian peoples, but while the Basques remained relatively isolated for millennia after this time, later migrations into Iberia led to distinct and additional admixture in all other Iberian groups.

In 2019, a study was published in Science in which a more modern time-transect of Iberian ancient populations including the Basque were analyzed. From their abstract, it says: "and we reveal that present-day Basques are best described as a typical Iron Age population without the admixture events that later affected the rest of Iberia." This indicates Basques were isolated from admixture with outside groups since at least 1000 BC, or 3000 years before the present. In Iberia, these later admixture (interbreeding) events were with central European (Celtic), eastern Mediterranean (Phoenician, Greek and Roman), northern African (Carthaginian and Mauritanian) and northern European (Gothic and Frankish) populations, and genomic ancestry from them are found in varying degrees in all or most present-day Iberian populations, except – albeit to a limited extent even there – for the Basque.

== Roman records ==
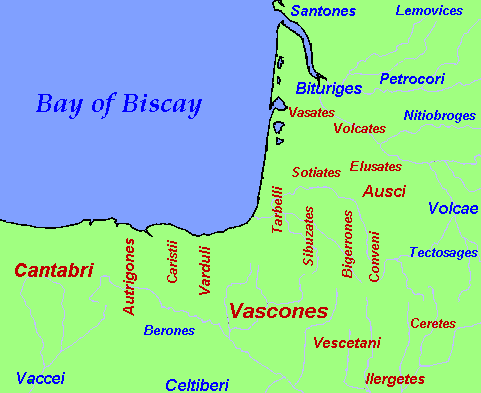
Basque and other pre-Indo-European tribes (in red) at the time of Roman arrival

The early story of the Basque people was recorded by Roman classical writers, historians and geographers, such as Pliny the Elder, Strabo, Ptolemy and Pomponius Mela. The present-day Basque Country was, by the time of the Roman arrival in the Iberian Peninsula, inhabited by Aquitanian and Celtic tribes. The Aquitanians spoke a language similar to, or identical to, Proto-Basque and included several tribes, such as the Vascones, who were located at both sides of the western Pyrenees. In present-day Biscay, Gipuzkoa, and Álava were located the Caristii, Varduli, and Autrigones, whose origin is still not clear. It is not known if these tribes were of Aquitanian origin, related to the Vascones, or if they were of Celtic origin. The latter seems more likely, based on the use of Celtic and Proto-Celtic toponyms by these tribes. These tribes would have then gone through a Basquisation, caused by progress of the Aquitanian tribes on their territory.

Strabo in the 1st century AD reported that the Ouaskonous (Vascones) inhabited the area around the town of Pompelo, and the coastal town of Oeaso (Οἰασών) in Hispania. He also mentioned other tribes between them and the Cantabri: the Varduli, Caristii, and Autrigones. About a century later, Ptolemy also listed the coastal Oeasso (Οἰασσώ) beside the Pyrénées to the Vascones, together with 15 inland towns, including Pompelon. Pompelo/Pompelon is easily identified as modern-day Pamplona, Navarre. The border port of Irún, where a Roman harbour and other remains have been uncovered, is the accepted identification of the coastal town mentioned by Strabo and Ptolemy. Three inscriptions in an early form of Basque found in eastern Navarre can be associated with the Vascones.

However, the Vascones appear to have been just one tribe within a wider language community. Across the border in what is now France, the Aquitanian tribes of Gascony spoke a language different from the Celts and were more like the Iberi. Although no complete inscription in their language survives, a number of personal names were recorded in Latin inscriptions, which attest to Aquitanian being the precursor of modern Basque (this extinct Aquitanian language should not be confused with Occitan, a Romance language spoken in Aquitaine since the beginning of the Middle Ages).

== Foundational myths ==
Between the 14th and 15th century, a series of historical legends were created with the objective of defending the singularity of the Basque people and their Fuero system, which regulated the relations between the Basque territories and the Crown. Among these legends are the Basque-Iberism, the Basque-Cantabrism, and The Battle of Arrigorriaga. These legends were used in a context of political vindication. In the 19th century, the Basque nationalists would use these legends as the basis for their vindications.

=== Tower of Babel ===
Developed by Esteban de Garibay and Andrés Poza, a "legend" states that the Basque people are direct descendants of Tubal, grandson of Noah, fifth son of Japheth. According to the legend, Japheth and his tribe, the Iberians, departed to the Iberian Peninsula, settling between the Pyrenees and the river Ebro, right after the confusion of languages in the Tower of Babel. Then, the Basque language would be one of the 72 languages that were created as a punishment of God after the Tower of Babel.

=== Basque-Cantabrism ===
Basque-Cantabrism is based on a historical and geographical distortion of the Cantabrian Wars, based on a manuscript gloss that Cristóbal de Mieres, secretary of Lope García de Salazar (1399–1476) introduced on a 1491 copy of Las bienandanzas e fortunas. This legend makes the Vascones the protagonists of these wars.

== See also ==
- Aizkolaritza
- Basque people
- Basque language
- Basque Country (greater region)
- Haplogroup R-DF27
- Genetic history of the Iberian Peninsula
