= Vicente Fatrás =

Spanish politician

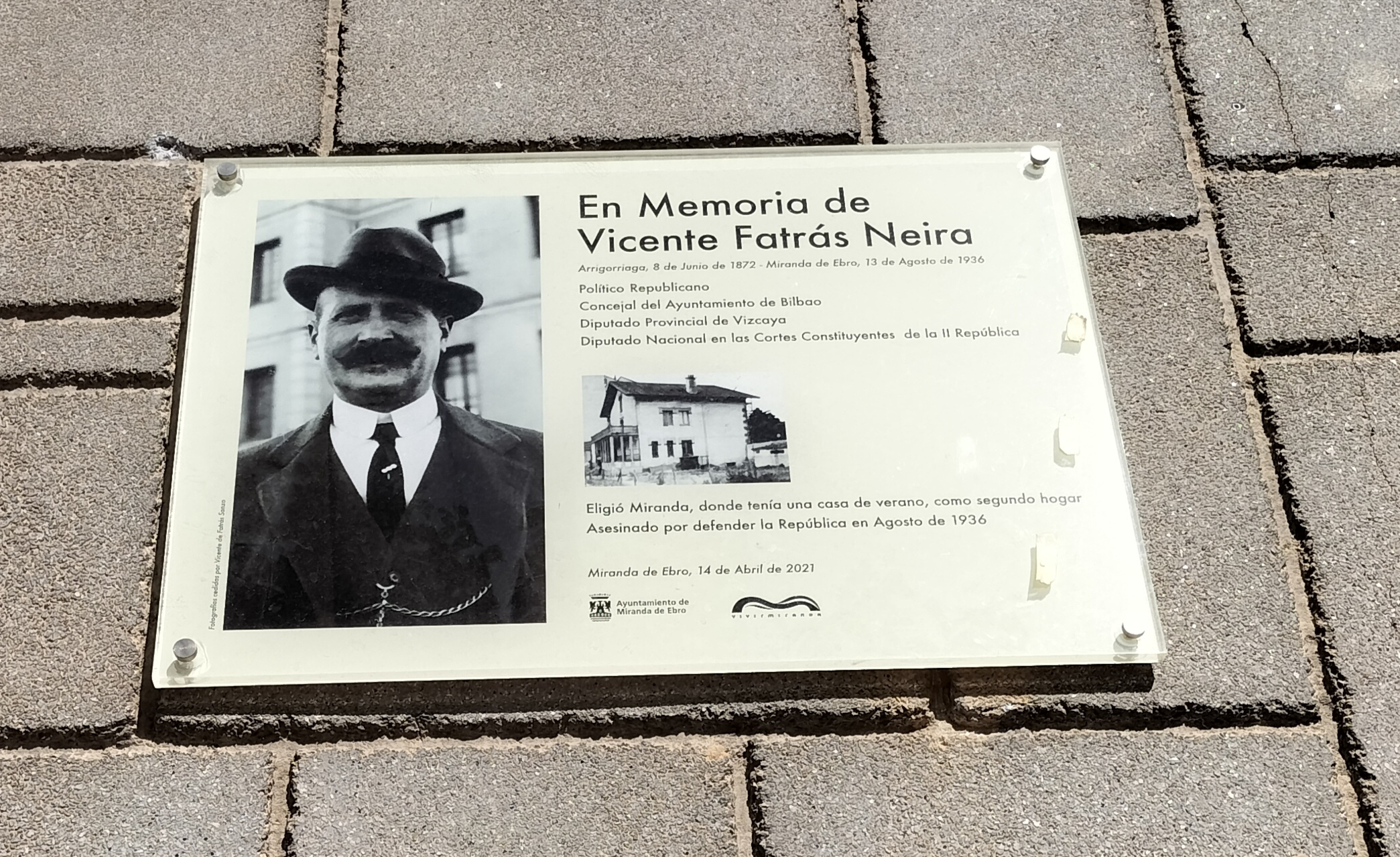

Vicente Fatrás Neira (22 January 1872, Arrigorriaga - Miranda de Ebro, between 24 July and 7 September 1936) was a Spanish politician. In his younger years he was also one of Spain's first racing cyclists.

== Biography ==
A historical Republican, he was a councilor in Bilbao at the beginning of the century and a provincial parliamentarian for Vizcaya in the 1910s. In 1918, he drafted a proposal for the autonomy statute for Biscay.

In 1929, Fatrás was one of the founders of the Biscayan wing of the Radical Socialist Party. In 1931 he was president of the Sociedad El Sitio de Bilbao, a member of the Biscayan executive committee of the Republican-Socialist Conjunction representing the radical socialists and candidate for Deputy for the Conjunction in the Spanish General elections of that year in Vizcaya. This was the only Basque-Navarre constituency where the Catholic-Fuerista Coalition did not win. As a result, Fatrás obtained a deputy seat (just like Indalecio Prieto, Luis Araquistáin and Ramón María de Aldasoro).

In the Cortes he starred in numerous confrontations against Basque traditionalists and nationalists. While he was in favor of a democratic Basque statute, he strongly opposed Estella's Statute, which he described as being supported by "clerical fanaticism." In May 1933 in the Cortes he publicly accused the Basque Nationalist Party for being responsible for the events of Usánsolo (Biscay), in which radical socialists returning from a rally in Amorebieta and Basque nationalists got into a gunshot confrontation, resulting in the death of a woman and a child.

Fatrás remained in the party after the departure of Marcelino Domingo's independents and was a candidate for the PRRS in the 1933 general elections, as well as for the provincial elections of Vizcaya, but did not get elected. He did not stand for the 1936 elections.

Although he was originally from Bilbao, he owned a summer house in Miranda de Ebro. The outbreak of the Spanish Civil War caught up with him there. Although he was not immediately arrested (on July 21 he received Ernesto Ercoreca, the Republican Mayor of Bilbao, who got trapped in Miranda when the railway line was cut on his way back from Madrid), Fatrás was eventually taken from his house by Franco's Nationalist rebels. They subsequently informed his wife that he had been shot, without it being known where or where his remains lie, and afterwards his family was expropriated of all his property.

== Cycling career ==
In the early years of Spanish cycling, before 1900, Fatrás was a well known rider. He was successful especially in his home region of Bilbao.

1892
1st Bilbao - Castrejana - Zorroza - Bilbao
1893
1st Bilbao - San Sebastián
3rd Bilbao - Balmaseda - Bilbao
1894
1st Bilbao - Balmaseda - Bilbao

== See also ==
- Partido Republicano Radical Socialista

== Bibliography ==
- De la Granja Sainz, José Luis (2008). Nacionalismo y II República en el País Vasco: estatutos de autonomía, partidos y elecciones : historia de Acción Nacionalista Vasca, 1930-1936. Siglo XXI de España Editores. ISBN 9788432313097.
