= Haplogroup R-DF27 =

Human Y-chromosome haplogroup

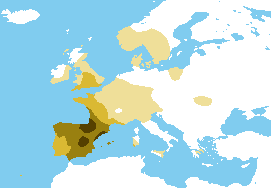
- Possible time of origin: 4,200 years BP
- Possible place of origin: Central Europe
- Ancestor: R-M269, R-L151, P312, Z40481, ZZ11
- Defining mutations: R-M167, R-M153
- Highest frequencies: Gallo-Iberians (Basques, Catalans, Galicians, Asturians, Gascons, Béarnese and others)

In human genetics, Haplogroup R-DF27 (R1b1a2a1a2a) is a Y-chromosome haplogroup which is a subdivision of haplogroup R-M269 (more specifically, its subclade R-) defined by the presence of the marker DF27 (also known as S250). Along with R-U152 and R-L21, the lineage is to a significant extent associated with Proto-Celtic, Celtic and later Celtiberian movements.

It arose comparatively recently, after the beginning of the European Bronze Age, and is mostly prevalent in the population of the Pyrenees region. The regions where it has been mostly found are Basque Country, Navarre, Asturias, Galicia, Portugal, Aragon, Catalonia, Pyrénées-Atlantiques as well as some presence in Great Britain and Ireland, though it has been found in smaller quantities as far away as Germany and Poland.

Specific subclades of DF27 have been associated with specific groups of people, for example R-M167 is associated with the Catalans and R-M153 is associated with the Basques.

== Genetic testing ==
The technology to test for DF27 was developed by Thomas Krahn, then of Family Tree DNA. This marker was discovered to exist among people who had taken part in the Human Genome Diversity Project. Richard A. Rocca made a pioneering study of DF27, which was published in 2012 in the article Discovery of Western European R1b1a2 Y Chromosome Variants in 1000 Genomes Project Data, in the peer-reviewed journal PLOS Biology. He based his study on 208 people who had tested as R-M269 and were from Great Britain, Tuscany (Italy), Spain, Finland, Utah (United States) and Latin American (Colombia, Puerto Rico, etc).

== Distribution ==
According to a 2017 article published in Springer Nature entitled, Analysis of the R1b-DF27 haplogroup shows that a large fraction of Iberian Y-chromosome lineages originated recently in situ, DF27 was found in frequences of 40% in the general population of the Iberian Peninsula and in particular spikes at 70% among the Basques. Overall in France it accounts for between 6–20% of the population but has a high level in the Pyrenees area. It is estimated to have developed around 4,200 years ago in north-eastern Prehistoric Iberia as the Neolithic made way for the Atlantic Bronze Age. The DF27 subgroups correspond closely to the various pre-Roman kingdoms formed by the Celtiberians.

== Subclades ==
=== Y-DNA R-DF27 subclades ===
- DF27*
- R1b1a1a2a1a2a1-Z195
- ZZ12_1
- SK1907

== See also ==
- Genetic history of the Iberian Peninsula
- Genetic history of Europe
- Origin of the Basques
- Atlantic Modal Haplotype
