= Bienandanzas e Fortunas =

15th century book series by García de Salazar

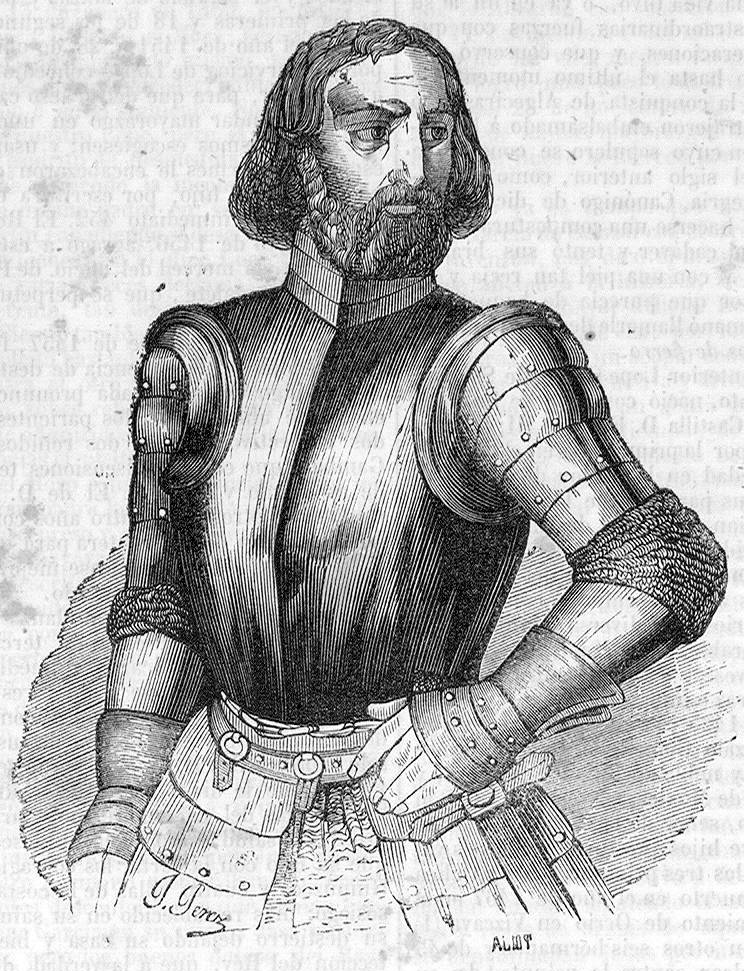
Lope García de Salazar

Bienandanzas e Fortunas (Prosperities and Fortunes), by the medieval Spanish factionalist Oñacino lord, Lope García de Salazar, is a work in 25 volumes that blends history, legend, and tradition. It spans from the creation of the world to the middle of the 15th century. It was written in the late 15th century by García de Salazar while imprisoned in his tower‑house of San Martín de Muñatones.

== Sections ==
As described in its prologue, the work deals with the following historical and legendary subjects:

- It begins with the creation of the world, the flood, the Tower of Babel, Babylon, Abraham, the people of Israel, Troy, Hercules, Alexander the Great, Carthage, and Rome;
- It continues with the Duchy of Milan, the kingdoms of France, Brittany, Flanders, and Burgundy, the Dauphiné, and the kings and nobles of these lands. Also of Venice, England, Scotland, Ireland, the city of London and the visit made there by Joseph of Arimathea and his son, of King Arthur of England and King Charles of France. Then it discusses the "heresy of the false Muhammad" and the sect of the "Al‑Arab Moors" and the Turks. Also Godfrey of Bouillon and the Crusades;
- On Spanish matters (fechos d’España), it begins with the peopling of the land, the arrival of Hercules, the wars of the Carthaginians and Romans, Hamilcar, Hannibal and the Scipiones, and the defense of the Spaniards against foreign invaders;
  - It continues with the Goths, the Muslim invasion, the early Christian kingdoms, and the Kingdom of León;
  - It then follows with the formation of Castile, the union of Castile and León up to the reign of Henry IV of Castile, and the deeds of the Cid Campeador;
  - It goes on with the kings of Navarre, from Íñigo Arista to Don Juan, the kings of Portugal, how Biscay was settled and governed, and the noble lineages of Castile, Labourd, Gascony, Guipúzcoa, Biscay, Las Encartaciones, Álava, and Oviedo and its mountain regions;
  - Finally, it deals with the factional wars from Gascony to the Asturias of Oviedo and the brotherhoods of Galicia.
