= Zaratamo =

Coordinates: 43°12′46″N 2°52′20″W

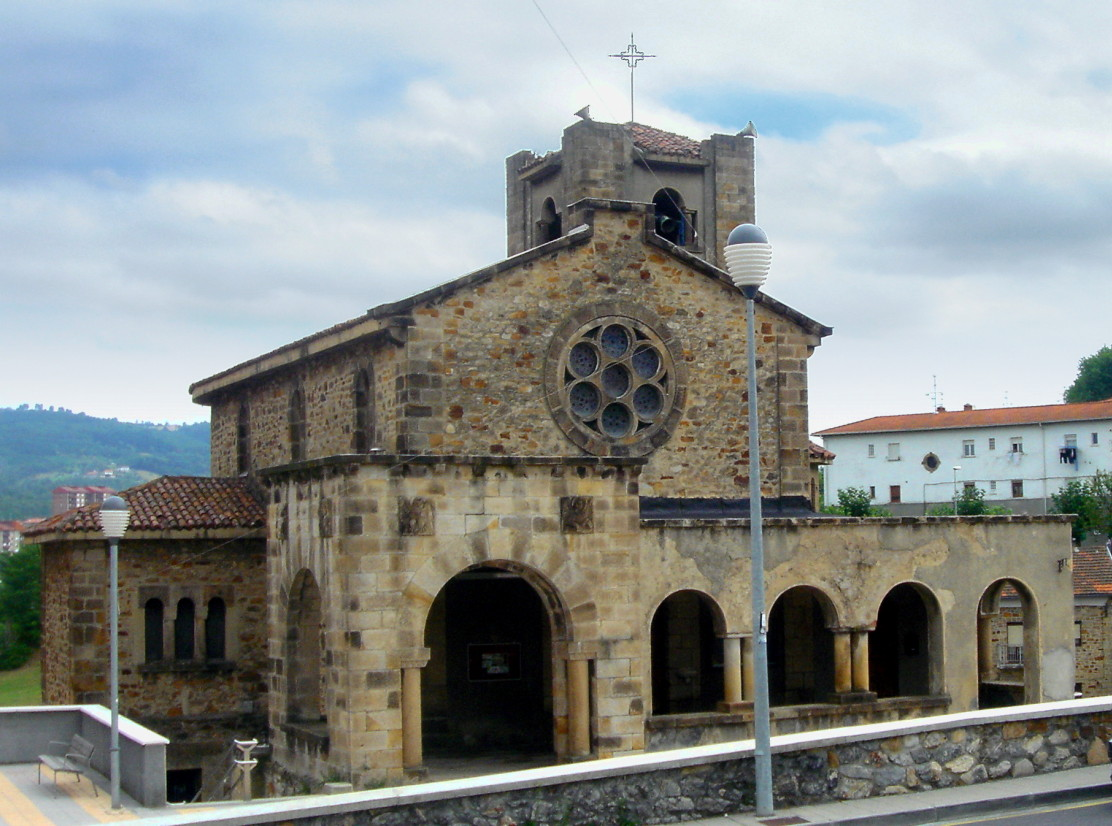
- Church of Arkotxa in Zaratamo

- Coat of arms

- Location in Spain.
- Country: Spain
- Autonomous community: Biscay

Government
  - Mayor: Jon Ajuria Fisure

Area
  - Total: 10 km^{2} (3.9 sq mi)
- Elevation: 172 m (564 ft)

Population (2025-01-01)
  - Total: 1,609
  - Density: 160/km^{2} (420/sq mi)
- Time zone: UTC+1 (CET)
  - Summer (DST): UTC+2 (CEST)
- Website: www.zaratamo.com

Zaratamo (Spanish: Zarátamo) is a town and municipality located in the province of Biscay, in the autonomous community of Basque Country, northern Spain. Zaratamo has an area 10.2 km^{2} and an elevation of 173m. As of 2019 its population is 1,614 with a density of 158.8 people per km^{2}. 50.1% of the population is female while 49.9% is male.
