= Irati (film) =

- Basque theatrical release poster
- Directed by: Paul Urkijo Alijo
- Written by: Paul Urkijo Alijo
- Based on: El ciclo de Irati by J. L. Landa and J. Muñoz
- Starring: Eneko Sagardoy; Edurne Azkarate; Itziar Ituño; Iñigo Aranbarri; Elena Uriz; Kepa Errasti; Ramon Agirre; Nagore Aranburu; Iñaki Beraetxe; Josu Eguskiza; Unax Hayden
- Cinematography: Gorka Gómez
- Edited by: Elena Ruiz
- Music by: Aránzazu Calleja; Maite Arroitajauregi
- Production companies: Bainet; Ikusgarri Films; Kilima Media; La Fidèle Production; Irati Zinema AIE
- Distributed by: Filmax
- Release dates: 9 October 2022 (Sitges); 24 February 2023 (Spain)
- Countries: Spain; France
- Language: Basque
- Budget: €4.3 million

Irati is a 2022 epic fantasy adventure film written and directed by Paul Urkijo Alijo based on the graphic novel El ciclo de Irati which stars Eneko Sagardoy alongside Edurne Azkarate and Itziar Ituño. A Spanish-French co-production shot in Basque heavily borrowing from Basque mythology, the film is set in the 8th century against the backdrop of the ongoing Christianization of remote areas around the Pyrenees. The plot tracks Eneko (Sagardoy), son to a Basque chieftain who died in battle, who journeys into the forest to find the body of his father, guided by pagan woman Irati (Azkarate).

Irati world premiered at the 55th Sitges Film Festival on 9 October 2022. It was released theatrically in Spain by Filmax on 24 February 2023. It received five Goya Awards nominations. It became the highest-grossing Basque-language film ever.

== Plot ==
In the year 778 in a remote valley of the western Pyrenees, Eneko Ximenez, son of the lord of the valley, seeks council from Luxa, a wise sorgina (cunning woman). Though he is nominally a Christian, his concern regarding a coming host of Franks under Charlemagne leads him to enter Mari's abode to ask for the goddess' aid. When the rear of the Frankish column is crossing a pass, they are ambushed by Basques. In the thick of battle, Eneko performs a ritual slitting his own throat, causing giant boulders to rain from the sky, crushing the Franks.

Meanwhile, Eneko's son, also called Eneko, is separated from his mother and chased through the woods by a Frankish warrior. He hides by a river, and watches as a lamia bewitches the warrior and drowns him. He is found by a girl, Irati, who finds his fear of the woods amusing. Eneko watches as his father is buried according to the ancient ways, including the ritual execution of two prisoners from the battle. His grandfather, the lord Ximeno, arranges for him to be sent to Bigorra to be educated, and for his mother Oneka to be remarried to Emir Fortun Ibn Qasi to secure an alliance with the Muslim Banu Qasi.

Fifteen years later, Eneko returns to his homeland. On the way to his grandfather's fort, he encounters Irati, who has attacked a group of men sent to chop down the forest under orders from Belasko, a local chieftain. After making the men let her go, he arrives at the fort, where he reunites with his mother; his ailing grandfather rambles about a hidden treasure hoard, and asks to be buried with his son according to the Christian rite, before dying in Eneko's arms. Eneko's father's body is found to have been replaced with that of a ram. The local chieftains convene in the castle, and have Luxa, who tried to stop the exhumation as blasphemy, imprisoned; Eneko, whose claim to the lordship of the valley has been contested by Belasko, visits her in the dungeon, where she reveals his father's body is in Mari's cave deep in the forest, together with the hoard taken from the Franks after the battle. Unbeknownst to them, they are overheard by a maid who promptly tells Belasko.

Eneko sets out into the woods, guided by Irati at Luxa's behest; all the while followed by Belasko's men. Before entering the cavern, Irati gives Eneko an eguzki-lore amulet for protection; he reluctantly wears it. Inside the cavern, Irati and Eneko are briefly attacked by Velasco's men, and then by Tartalo, a man-eating, one-eyed giant; in the chaos, it is revealed Irati is not fully-human, having webbed duck-like feet like a lamia. Eneko falls down a pit.

Deep in the cave, Eneko finds Mari and makes a bargain with the goddess: she will return his father's body, in exchange for the lives of Belasko and his cronies. Mari also reveals Irati is her daughter and tells Eneko to protect her. Emerging from the cave, Eneko tracks down the men and saves Irati. As they recover from wounds during the night, they fornicate.

With his father's sword recovered from the hoard, Eneko returns to the fort, where he tries to lure Belasko into coming with him to the cave, assuring him there is no danger there. Belasko then reveals he knew the truth all along, and takes Eneko, his mother, and Irati prisoner. He then executes Luxa. Mad with grief, Irati's eyes begin to glow as she summons a hailstorm. The soldiers and common folk run for shelter, and Eneko sees a ram take Irati upon its back, and fly her into the storm. She is taken to Mari, her mother, and tells her she will deliver Belasko and his men, which also means Mari won't be able to take her along with the rest of her progeny when she makes her planned departure from a world where mortals barely remember her.

Belasko tries to torture the cave's location out of Eneko, but Irati appears and leads the men to a cave. There Mari appears before them, together with her serpent-consort Sugaar, who is revealed to be the creature that attacked them earlier. Irati slits Belasko's throat, and Mari unleashes her power and departs from the world in the form of a fire blast, which kills all inside the cave except Eneko, who is shielded by Irati. When the smoke clears, Irati bids both her mother and him farewell, telling him to forget her name while he is lord. She then discards her clothes by a riverbank, and disappears in the water.

Eneko is crowned lord of the valley, and his realm grows into a kingdom; he names the forest where he lived his adventures as the Irati Forest. Many years later, now old, he travels with his heir to a riverbank, where he bequeaths his kingdom and floats down the river to die. He is found by Irati and he joyfully cries.

== Cast ==
- Eneko Sagardoy as Eneko
- Edurne Azkarate as Irati
- Itziar Ituño as Mari
- Iñigo Aranbarri as Eneko X
- Elena Uriz as Luxa
- Kepa Errasti as Belasko
- Ramón Agirre as Virila
- Nagore Aranburu as Oneka
- Iñaki Beraetxe as Ximeno
- Aitor Barandiaran as Anso
- Josu Eguskiza as Odon
- Unax Hayden as child Eneko
- Gaizka Chamizo as Berex
- Karlos Arguiñano as Gorza

== Production ==
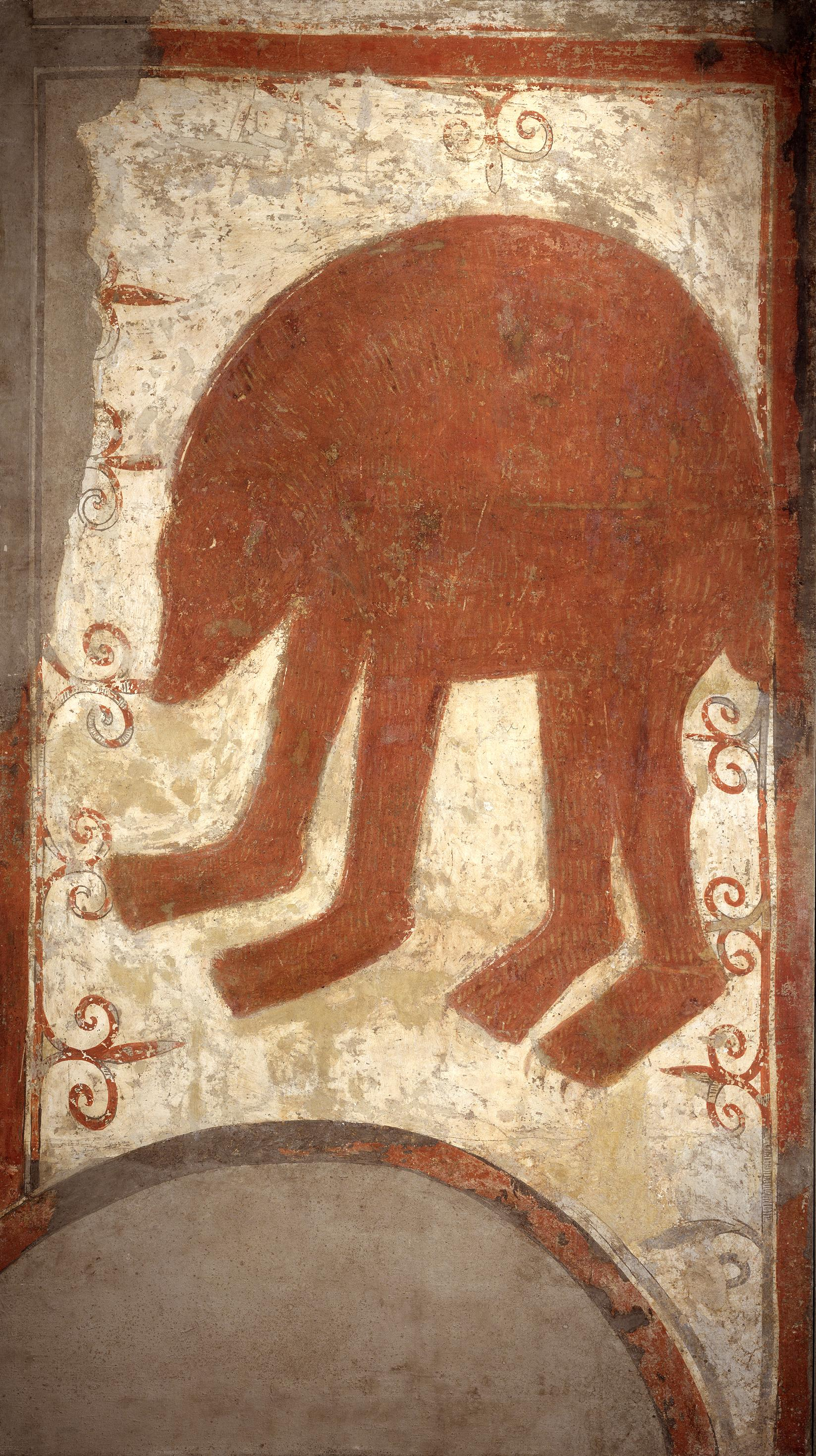
This 12th-century mural painting of a bear from San Baudelio de Berlanga inspired the decoration of the castle in the film.

Irati is based on the graphic novel El ciclo de Irati ("The Irati Cycle"), authored by J. L. Landa and J. Muñoz. It was produced by Irati Zinema AIE (Bainet, Ikusgarri Films and Kilima Media) alongside La Fidèle Production, with support from ICAA, EiTB, RTVE, Gobierno Vasco, Ayuntamiento de Vitoria-Gasteiz and Diputación Foral de Álava. It boasts a €4.3 million budget, receiving the maximum cap of funding from the Spanish Ministry of Culture.

Dialogue is in a mixture of modern and 13th-century Basque, with some Latin, Arabic and Frankish. Filming wrapped in November 2021. It was shot in the Pyrenees (Navarre and the province of Huesca), including locations such as the Irati Forest, and the Castle of Loarre.

Urkijo's inspirations besides Basque mythology were the films Excalibur, Braveheart, Kingdom of Heaven, The Vikings, The War Lord, Robin and Marian, The Name of the Rose, The 13th Warrior, Pan's Labyrinth, The Lord of the Rings and Princess Mononoke.

== Release ==
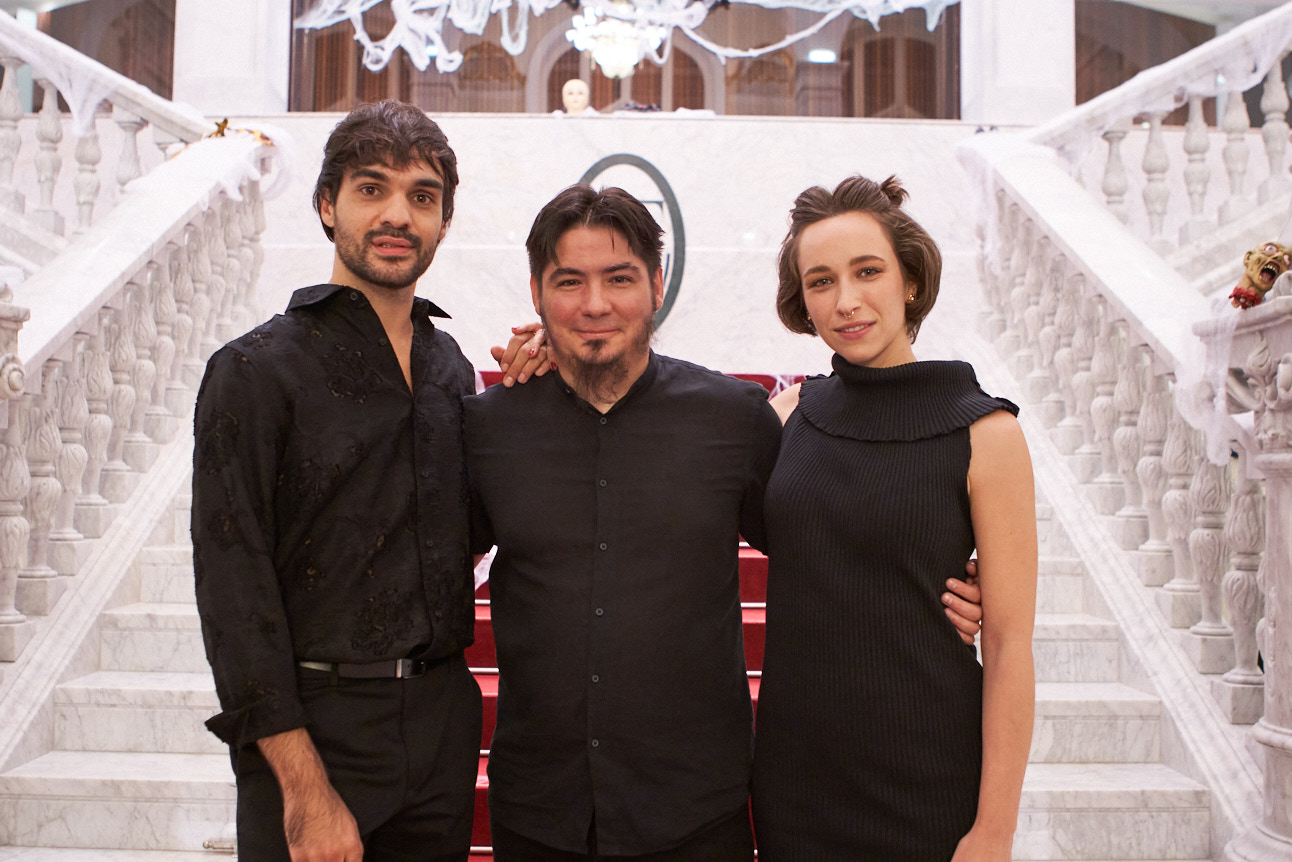
Sagardoy, Urkijo, and Azkarate attending the Victoria Eugenia Theatre during the San Sebastián Fantasy and Horror Film Festival in October 2022

The film was selected for screening at the 55th Sitges Film Festival, making its presentation on 9 October 2022. Distributed by Filmax, it was set for a 18 November 2022 theatrical release date in Spain. The release was later rescheduled to 24 February 2023.

Filmax closed international distribution deals with Blue Swan (Italy) and Splendid (Germany).

Having grossed over €733,000, Irati became the highest-grossing Basque-language film ever.

== Reception ==
On the American review aggregation website Rotten Tomatoes, the film records a 100% approval rating based on 6 reviews from critics, with an average rating of 7.80/10.

Júlia Olmo of Cineuropa described Irati as a "Basque Lord of the Rings, but with a lot less money", and complimented the level of ambition, also writing how it "speaks poetically about timeless human issues", such as "weight of roots, the idea of loyalty and honour, the meaning of identity, the struggle for a place and the value of that struggle, the meaning of faith, the classic concept of 'the beautiful death' (filling one's life with deeds to achieve eternal glory, to be remembered and loved in eternity), the fear of forgetting, the presence of death in life, the search for your origins and the price of that search".

Shelagh Rowan-Legg of Screen Anarchy described it as "a woman's story", otherwise pointing out that it is an unusual film because it manages to combine fantastical elements with a "story grounded to a place and time that is unique and real".

== Accolades ==
Year	Award	Category	Nominee(s)	Result	Ref.
2022	55th Sitges Film Festival	Audience Award (Fantàstic Official Selection)		Won	
2022	55th Sitges Film Festival	Best Special, Visual or Makeup Effects		Won	
2023	37th Goya Awards	Best Adapted Screenplay	Paul Urkijo Alijo	Nominated	
2023	37th Goya Awards	Best Original Score	Aránzazu Calleja, Maite Arroitajauregi	Nominated	
2023	37th Goya Awards	Best Original Song	"Izena duena bada" by Aránzazu Calleja, Maite Arroitajauregi "Mursego", Paul Urkijo Alijo	Nominated	
2023	37th Goya Awards	Best Costume Design	Nerea Torrijos	Nominated	
2023	37th Goya Awards	Best Special Effects	Jon Serrano, David Heras	Nominated	

== See also ==
- List of Spanish films of 2023
