= Sorginak =

Supernatural being in Basque mythology

Sorginak (root form: sorgin, absolutive case (singular): sorgina) are the assistants of the goddess Mari in Basque mythology. It is also the Basque name for witches, priests and priestesses, making it difficult to distinguish between mythological beings and real religious figures.

Sometimes sorginak are confused with lamiak (similar to nymphs). Together, lamiak, Jentilak and sorginak are said to have built the local megaliths.

Sorginak used to participate in Akelarre. These mysteries happened on Friday nights, when Mari and Sugaar are said to have met in a sacred local cave to create storms.

== Etymology ==
The etymology of the name is disputed. The common suffix -gin ("actor", from egin: "to do") is the only agreed upon element.

One theory claims that sor derives from sorte ("fortune"), and hence would be rendered as "fortune-teller". Another states that sor is the radical of sor(tu) ("to create"), and hence sorgin literally means "creator".

== Major persecutions against Basque witches ==
While in the late Middle Ages there were a handful of references to witchery, these mostly regarded fines levied against people who accused others of being witches. This changed in the 16th and 17th centuries with the establishment of the Spanish Inquisition and the pan-European witch panic that afflicted the Early Modern Age. Since being conquered by Castile in 1512–21, Navarre (and to a lesser extent areas of the Basque Country) suffered numerous inquisitorial processes, mainly against Jews and Muslims, but occasionally also against Basque sorginak. Particularly important was the 1610 process of Logroño, which focused on the akelarre of Zugarramurdi.

During the previous year (1609) French judge Pierre de Lancre initiated a massive process in Labourd, focusing mainly on Basque women and priests. He was eventually displaced from his role, but only after he caused many deaths. The witch panic extended beyond the frontier and accusations of witchcraft proliferated among the local population until the Spanish Inquisition intervened. The 1610 Logroño process ended with 12 people burnt at the stake (five of them symbolically, as they had died under the tortures inflicted in the process) and shattered Pyrennean Navarre, also leading to a serious reconsideration of the Inquisition's attitude towards witchcraft accusations. The Spanish and Italian Inquisition generally approached accusations of sorcery and witchcraft with skepticism, and similar processes were rare in comparison to other European countries where no such centralised institution existed.

== Places associated with sorginak ==
Throughout the Basque Country there are many places associated with sorginak, often also associated with Mari or other mythological characters. This is an incomplete list of the most famous ones:

=== Álava ===
- Aramaio: the places of Abadelaueta, Anbotondo and Amezola, as well as an undetermined field at the Gorbea mountain are said to have been places of akelarres.
- Maeztu: a woman from this village, Margarita Jauri, was one of the "witches" tried by the Inquisition in the case of the Zugarramurdi coven. Though finally acquitted, she was so traumatised by the detention and torture that she committed suicide soon after her release.
- Urizaharra: the field of Urkiza or Urkizo seems to have been the site of the local akelarre.

=== Biscay ===
- Anboto peak is the well established principal home of Mari, also known as Anbotoko Sorgina (Witch of Anboto) and Anbotoko Damie (Lady of Anboto). Her home was said to be specifically in an unreachable cave known as Sorginkoba (witch's cave).
- Dima: the farmhouse of Petralanda was the main site of the akelarre of Arratia Valley in the 16th century, according to inquisitional records.
- Durango was the center of a medieval Beguine heresy that ended with 13 people burnt at the stake. Later, in the 16th and 17th centuries other inquisitional trials were held in this town.
- Mañaria: the cave of Azkondo was the witches' meeting place, according to local legend. José Miguel Barandiaran also mentions that the cliffs between the field of Akelarre and the cave of Silibranka (a Paleolithic site) were the playfield of demons.
- Murueta: the place of Etxebartxuko-landa, according to local legend.
- Muxika: several places attributed as akelarre-sites are called generically eperlanda (partridges' field).
- Orozko: local legend points to Garaigorta mountain as site of the local akelarre Also the cave of Supelegor, in the karstic area of Itxina, is associated with witches and especially lamiak, and it is even considered one of the mansions of Mari herself.
- Zalla: it is called "town of sorcerers"
- Zeberio: the local witches went to the akelarre of Petralanda (in Dima) but also met locally at Hereinoza household.

=== Gipuzkoa ===
- Andoain: an old bridge is said to have been built by witches.
- Ataun: the sites of Txabaltxo (near a creek), Iraubeltz (a wood), Mendabiita (a bridge), Zelaun (a plain), a creek near the Artzate farmhouse, the spring of Negarregi and the place of Dantzaleku are all said to have frequented by sorginak. Additionally several local sites bear their name: Sorginiturri (witches' spring), Sorginpelota (witches' ball game), Sorginzulo and Sorgizuloeta (witches' niche and niches respectively).
- Azkoitia: the farmhouse of Kimutxo.
- Bergara: Itxu mountain was the local site of akelarres.
- Errenteria: a woman from this village (now an industrial town), María Zozoaia, was one of the main accused in the process of Zugarramurdi. According to inquisitional records, they gathered in the field of Matxarena, that they called Atsegin Soro (pleasure orchard).
- Hernani: the cave of Sorgintxulo, as recorded by Barandiaran.
- Hondarribia: a local (but none-the-less brutal) series of inquisitorial trials in 1530 discovered that witches met at Jaizkibel mountain, near the hermitage of St. Barbara. Other sites that the accused declared to be their meeting places were: near the hermitage of St. Philip and St. James, or near the hermitage and castle of St. Telmo. Local popular legend instead says that the akelarres happened near one of the local bridges: either Mendelo, Puntal or Santa Engracia, during the feast of St. Agatha.
- Lezo: Inquisitor Ugarte was supposedly poisoned by the local witches in this village in 1531.
- Lizartza: near a fence at Aini mountain.
- Mendaro: the house of Silerokua or Silerene once was inhabited by a witch that, typically, transformed herself as cat to bother more chaste women, legend says.
- Oiartzun: witches met near the cliffs of Irantzi and Puilegi, according to legend.
- Oñati: the cave of Gaiztozulo (evil hole) is said to be one of the main homes of Mari and her court of sorginak.
- Pasaia: local woman Mari Zuloko was imprisoned in St. Sebastian, accused of witchery. Later she was stoned and expelled from her hometown, settling in Donibane-Lohitzune.
- Tolosa: it is said that witches used to wash clothes near Ugartebide. They also met in Edar Iturri and Sorginerreka.
- Zegama here goddess Mari, also often considered a witch, is known as Aketigiko Sorgina (witch of Aketegi mountain). It is also believed that she lives in Sorginzulo cave.

=== Labourd ===
Lapurdi was particularly shaken by the large-scale trials of 1609 led by Pierre de Lancre, who was convinced that most people in the country were witches.

- Arcangues: the people of this village had the fame of all being witches.
- Ascain: in the 1609 trials, the priest of this village was burnt at the stake as a witch.
- Saint-Jean-de-Luz: Alakoandia field and the bridges that are between this village and Ciboure.
- Hendaye: the local beach was the favorite site for the akelarre, specifically in a site then known as Lakua (the lake). In the 1609 trials it was declared by one of the accused that there was as many people in the local akelarre as stars are in the sky.
- Lahonce: the apparently many witches of this village met in Sohouta (Soule).
- Sare: several legends place witches as living in the houses of Egoainea, Ihartzegaraia and Larraburua. The local akelarre was sometimes celebrated at the Fikozelai field. Many local witches were tried in 1609, including several minors and the lady of Txantokorena household.
- Saint-Pée-sur-Nivelle: Pierre de Lancre lived here during the witch-hunt of 1609, in the castle of Amou, whose lord had asked for the trials to be initiated. According to the judicial records, the local akelarre took place either in the cemetery, in private houses or even in the castle of Amou itself, while the trial was active. What this means, if the record is true, is that it was done in the sight of de Lancre himself, which is very unlikely. Other unlikely akelarre-sites mentioned in the process are the hotel Barbarenena, on the very night when de Lancre was sleeping there, and in the home of maistre Segura, de Lancre's criminal advisor. Many local presumed witches were accused of plotting to kill de Lancre.
- Urrugne: two local witches were executed by de Lancre here. Others managed to flee to Lower Navarre.
- Ustaritz: in 1576 Marie Txorropike of the Ianetabarta household was burnt at the stake. Forty other supposed witches were also executed. Several people, including minors, were also processed here in 1609. The akelarre was celebrated at a site called Pagola.
- Ciboure: a large number of people from this town were processed in 1609, including five priests.

=== Navarre ===
Large portions of Navarre were severely affected by an inquisitorial process in 1610, focused in the akelarre of Zurgarramurdi.

- Abaurregaina: there's a local natural bridge named Sorginzubi (witches' bridge).
- Altsasu: local legend states that Mari lives in the cave of Odabe, having by main servant a sorgina.
- Araitz: the local witches met at Urrizola slope before flying to the akelarre.
- Arantza: the cliff of Arrutxipi is said to have been the living place of sorginak in the past.
- Areso: the cave of Uli, at Ulizar mountain, was the favorite site for the akelarre.
- Auritz: the sites of Basajaunberro (probably modern Patxaranberro), near Ortzanzurieta mountain and Sorginarizaga, near Roncesvalles. Two witch-hunts affected this municipality: in 1525–27 and in 1575.
- Bargota: Local priest Juanis de Bargota was also a famous witch. He had special relationship with a female witch of Biana, Endregoto (Lady Goto in Basque). Both were processed by the Inquisition in 1610 but, while Endregoto was burned at the stake, Juanis de Bargota avoided punishment by showing extreme repentance.
- Baztan: Abbot Aranibar of Urdazubi made many people confess guilty of witchery by means of torture in 1610, including many children. In 1612 a civil process was initiated against 7 local women. The tortures inflicted in the towers of Jauregizar and Jauregizuri were so brutal that the accused women claimed insistently to be moved to Logroño, to be judged by the Inquisition itself, as a lesser evil. It seems that the site of Dutxuketa (in Elbetea) might have been a meeting place for the witches. There is also a dolmen called Sorginetxe (witch's home).
- Bera: the local witches met apparently on Larrun mountain, along with their colleagues of Sara and Azkaine.
- Bertizarana: according to the inquisitorial records, witches met at Nabarte village. In 1611, also impelled by Abbot Aranibar, there was a witch-hunt in Legasa. Graciana de Maribertizena and her daughter were tortured brutally and confessed to all asked.
- Biana: a hill near the Las Cañas lagoon was apparently the site of the local akelarres, to which people came also from Logroño. Biana was also the hometown of Endregoto, the partner of famous male witch Juanis de Bargota, burnt at the stake in 1610.
- Burgi: according to an inquisitorial process of 1569, witches met in Larraionoa and Los Linares, as well as on a barrage at the river.
- Ergoiena: Arleze cave is said to have been used by witches. Putxerri cave (also Putterri or Bueitarri), in the Aralar range is said to be inhabited by genii that show themselves as animals, now red, now black, now white; another legend says it is a mansion of Mari and her sorginak, called in the area Putxerriko Damea (Lady of Putxerri).
- Esparza: Inquisitor Avellaneda tells how he tried to dismiss the incipient belief in witchery contacted local witches here and was initiated by anointing their magic oil on all them. He then believed to have seen his partners to have done unbelievable feats. After that experience he retook his inquisitorial duties with even greater dedication. The processes that shattered the Salazar valley in 1532 and 1539 record a place called Soto de Tarragona, impossible to locate, as site of the local akelarre. Sometimes the hermit of St. Tirso has been named as place of sabbats as well.
- Etxalar was also affected by the 1610 process. In the process, the field of Aranduriaretxa (also Urristilde or Sarueta) and the site of Larbure, were named as akelarre locations.
- Garaioa: in 1525, local Martin Lizuain was burnt at the stake in Auritz. In 1577, accused by a 5-year-old boy, seven women were processed and acquitted. Two of them died during the tortures.
- Hiriberri: the mountain of Petxuberro (also Petiriberro) is said to have been the site of the akelarre of the Aezkoa Valley.
- Izaba: a possible akelarre is said to have taken place in Berin-pikua.
- Ituren: the local akelarre apparently used to take place on the heights of Mendaur mountain, near the summit. The processes of 1525 and 1610 affected this village.
- Itza: the peak of Oskia or Arkaitz is said to be meeting place for witches here.
- Larraun: in Alli cave a nearby, where the dolmen of Akelar is located. Also in the field of Urrizolaegia.
- Lerga: the site of Campoluengo.
- Lesaka: in the process of 1610 was said that the local akelarre took place in the field of Kolunba.
- Miranda de Arga: field of Baiona.
- Otxagabia: Legend says that Joan I of Navarre was killed by the black magic of the Bishop of Troyes (who was effectively accused of witchery in 1308–13); since then this queen's ghost dwells in the Irati forest, seeking revenge. The local akelarre apparently took place in the main plaza of the village, though sometimes took place in Aboddibidea, deep in the mountains.
- Pamplona: the capital of Navarre was affected by the trial of 1527.
- Piedramillera: near Dos Hermanas twin peaks.
- Erronkari: Bedagin-pikoa was the site of the local akelarre. The valley was affected by the persecution of 1532.
- Ultzama: the mountains of Aldaun, Xuxurro, Urbilaga and Elizamendia have been said to be sabbatic sites.
- Urdazubi: In the 1609 witch-hunt of Labourd, several accused declared to have celebrated the sabbat inside the church of this village. According to Barandiaran, all neighbours of Alkerdi, where there is an important Paleolithic cave-site, as considered to be witches.
- Ziordi: Bekatu-Larre (field of sins) was apparently the site of local akelarres. This village was affected by inquisitorial processes in 1575–76 and 1610.
- Zugarramurdi: Akelarrenlezea (cave of the akelarre) is just 500 meters away from the village. Actually witches met in the field of Berroskoberro outside the caves. This village was the focus of the largest and more infamous inquisitorial process, that took place in 1610 in Logroño. Seven people were burnt at the stake and other five were burnt symbolically, along with their remains (they had died during the process). A local legend says that all women of Azkar are witches.

=== Lower Navarre ===
- Bidarray: Ebrain bridge, known also as Infenuko zubia (Hell's bridge) is said to have been built by lamiak or sorginak in a single night.
- Saint-Michel: the people of this village have been traditionally considered witches as a whole. In other time they were nicknamed akelartarrak (akelarreans).
- Iholdy: the local witches apparently washed clothes at Oxarti creek.

=== Soule ===
- Alçay-Alçabéhéty-Sunharette: Arlegiko Kutxia (Arlegi's cross) is a place that was said that witches made appearances. Another site of akelarres is Artegaina. Near this place there's a cave named Ertzagainako karbia, where legend says a dragon once dwelt.
- Chéraute: the witches of this village and that of Lahuntza met a some field near Mauléon.

== See also ==
- Akelarre
- Basque mythology
- Basque people
- Mari (goddess)
- Witchcraft
- Witch-hunt
- Spanish Inquisition
- Pierre de Lancre
- Megalith
- María de Zozaya
- Brujería
