= Jentil =

Basque mythological giants

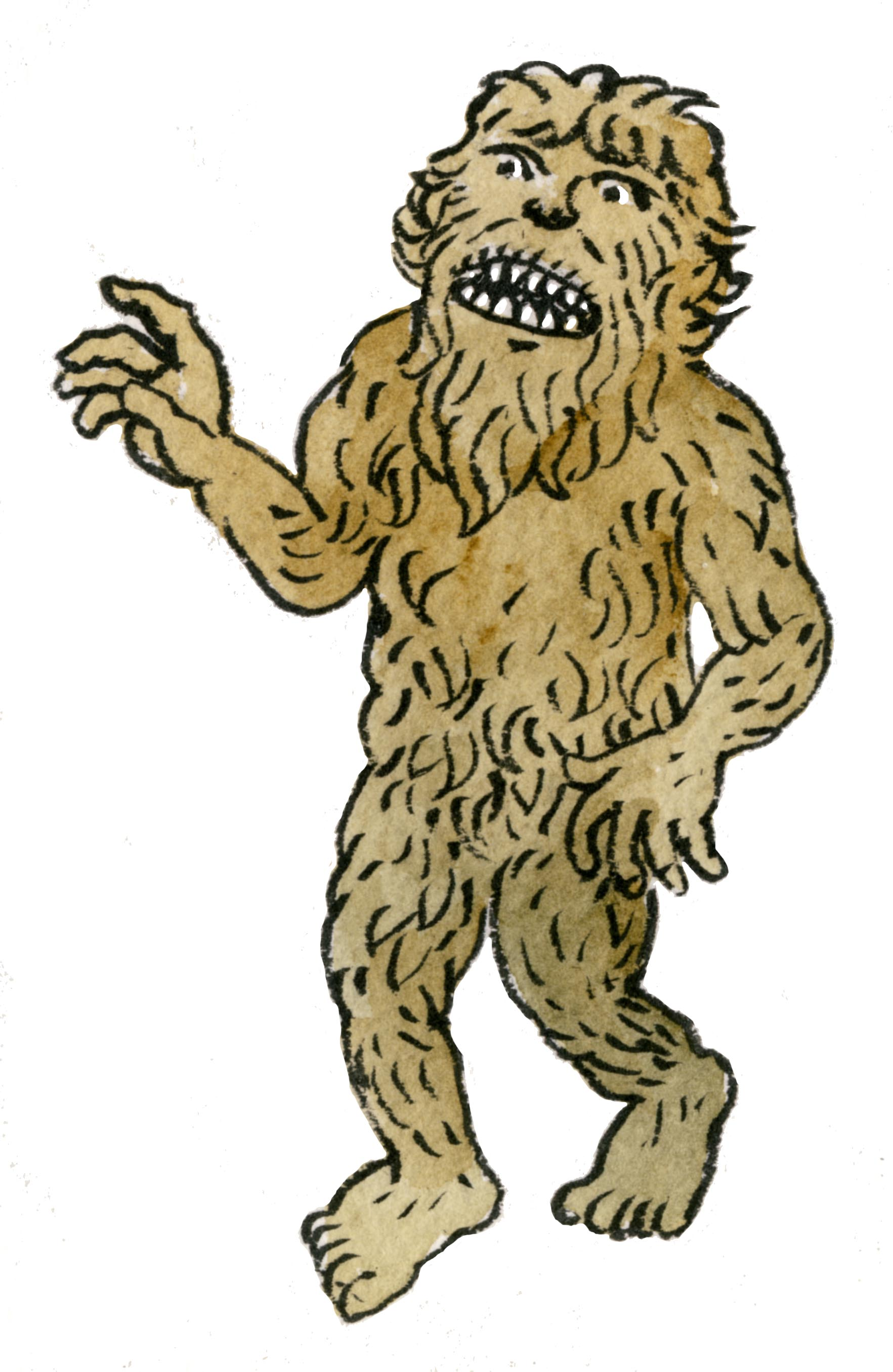
Artist's depiction of a Jentil

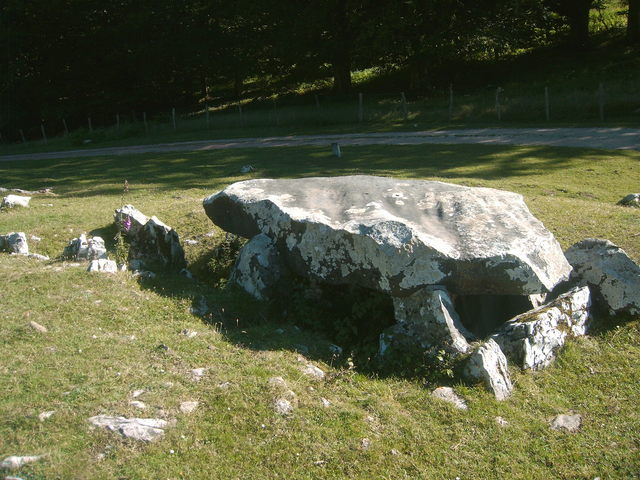
Jentilarri, Aralar.

The jentil (or jentilak with the Basque plural) are a race of giants in Basque mythology. This word meaning gentile, from Latin gentilis, was used to refer to pre-Christian civilizations and in particular to the builders of megalithic monuments, to which the other Basque mythical legend the Mairuak are involved too.

The jentil were believed to have lived alongside the Basque people. They were hairy and so tall that they could walk in the sea and throw rocks from one mountain to another. This stone throwing has led to several tales and explanations for ancient stone buildings and large isolated rocks. Even the Basque ball game, pilota, is ascribed to these stone-throwers. The tradition lives on in the Basque power games of stone lifting and throwing. Some attributed to the jentil the defeat of Roland in the Battle of Roncevaux, where the Basques defeated the Frankish army by throwing rocks on them. The giants were believed to have created the Neolithic monuments, such as dolmens, found around the Basque Country.

They also were said to have invented metallurgy and the saw and first grew wheat, teaching humans to farm. However, they were unwilling to move to the valleys from the mountains, with a certain unwillingness to progress. They disappeared into the earth under a dolmen in the Arratzaren valley in Navarra when a portentous luminous cloud – perhaps a star – appeared, said to have heralded the birth of Christ (Kixmi) and the end of the jentil age. Other stories say jentil threw themselves from a mountain. Only Olentzero remained, a giant who appears at Christmas and is reproduced as straw dolls.

There are many structures and places around the Basque Country with jentil in their name, generally referring to pagan or ancient places, supposedly built by the jentil. Dolmens are jentilarri or jentiletxe, harrespil are jentilbaratz, caves can be jentilzulo or jentilkoba.

== See also ==
- Basajaun
- Giant (mythology)
- Hominid cryptids
- Lamia
- Mari
- Sorginak
