= Basajaun =

Basque mythological figure

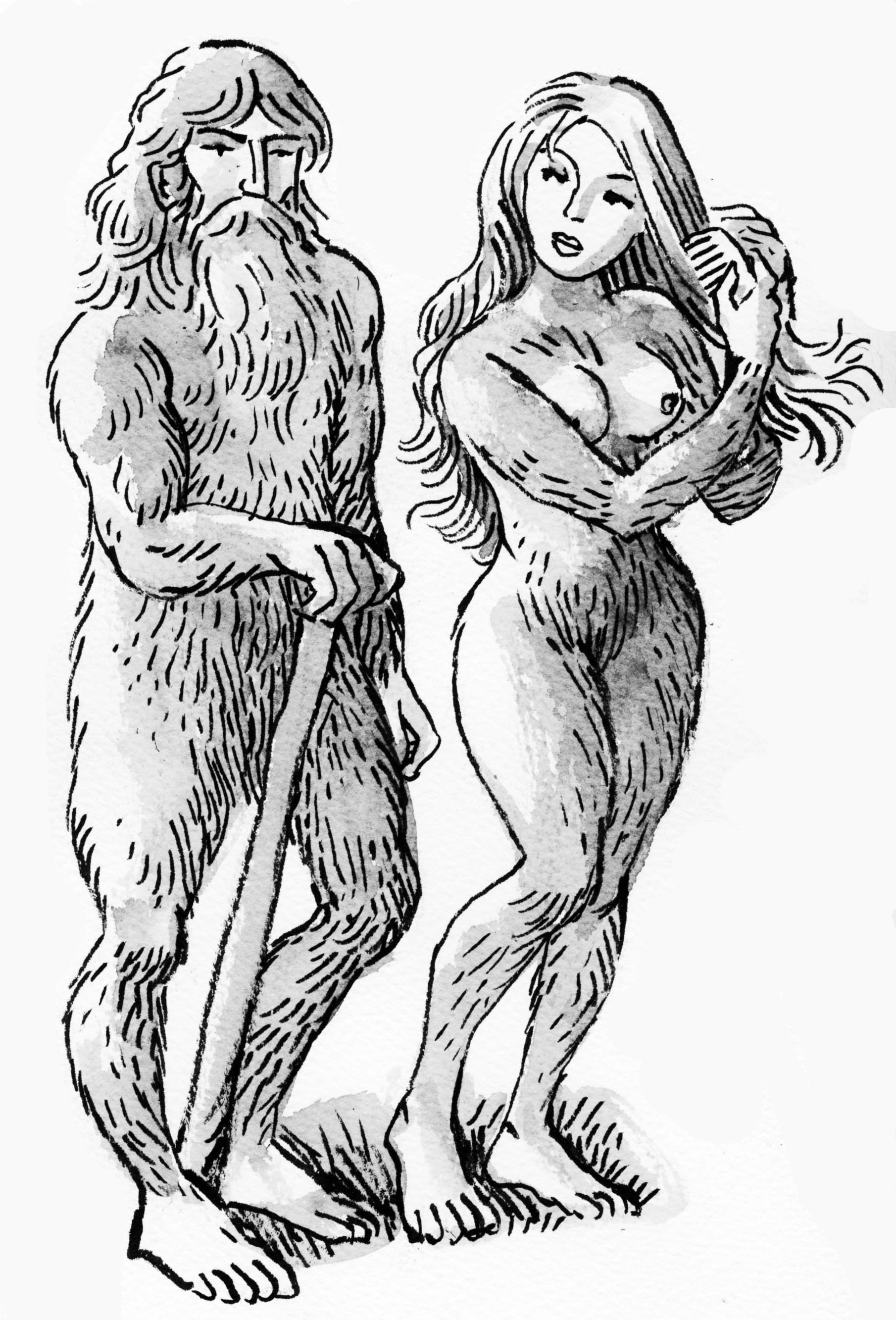
Artist's depiction of a basajaun and his female companion, a basandere.

In Basque mythology, Basajaun (Basque pronunciation: [bas̺ajaun], "Lord of the forest", plural: basajaunak, female basandere) is a huge, hairy hominid dwelling in the woods. They were thought to protect flocks of livestock and teach skills such as agriculture and ironworking to humans.

== Nomenclature ==
Basajaun (var. Baxajaun, Basque pronunciation: [baʃajaun]) is glossed "Lord of the forest" (Note: Spanish: "Señor de los Bosques".) (Note: Spanish: "Señor de las selvas", French: "Seigneur des bois".) or the "wild lord". (Note: "le seigneur sauvage".) The female counterpart is the Basandere (var. Basa Andre, Basa-Andre,) probably created during a later period by analogy.

The creature is called Basajun in the Basque-Navarre valleys as well as the Aragonese Pyrenees to where the name may have been transmitted (from Basque country) while the creature is called Basajarau, Bonjarau in the Tena Valley and the vales of the cities of Anso and Broto in Aragon, places that preserve Basque toponymy. It is also known as Bosnerau in Aragonese myth. Thus the creature is also known in the neighboring regions as part of Aragonese mythology.

Basajaun is also called Ancho (var. Antxo, (Note: Cerquand (1875a), pp. 251–252 "9. Ancho et les Vachers" (Basque text: p. 281), revised in Lower Navarrese orthography to "Antxo et les vachers".) anxo). Thus in the tale retitled "Basajaun captured" by Vinson, Ancho is identified as equivalent to the Basajaun at the beginning of the text. (Note: "IX. Basa-Jaun attrapé" Told by Marie Martirene of Mendive, aged 74. Cerquand (1876b), "29. Ancho et le Clerc", 2: 27–28, reprinted from Cerquand (1876a), pp. 201–202, Basque text: Cerquand (1876a), p. 244)

== General description ==
The Basajaun is said to have a tall, human form with his face and body covered in hair, with the strands reaching the knees, walking upright like a man. (Note: Joseph Augustin Chaho quoted in translation by Carr (2018).)

His two feet are differently shaped, thus leaving an odd set of foot tracks. While one foot is normal, the other one (left foot) is rounded like the tree stump (base of a tree trunk) and leaves circular footprints.

He may have a single eye in the middle of the forehead, though this is also the attribute of the Tartalo with which the Basajaun is often confounded. That is to say, the role of the giant in a certain tale type can be substituted by the "Tartaro" or "Basa Jaun", depending on the telling.

The basajaunak dwell in the forests and caverns at higher altitudes or "prominent places". More specifically, it is said to inhabit the mountainside of the Gorbea in Biscay Province (or the forests of Zeanuri town nearby), around Ataun town which is the backwoods of neighboring Gipuzkoa Province, and the Irati Forest of the Pyrenees in Navarre Province.

The Basajaun is protective of sheep flocks from wild beasts (wolves) and storms. An indication of his presence is that the sheep will all start shaking their bells simultaneously and the shepherd can go to sleep and delegate the night watch to the Basajaun. When a storm (or a pack of wolves) is approaching, the Basajaun makes a howling cry in the mountains to warn shepherds, giving people opportunity to move their flocks inside the folds.

A local folktale relates how the cowherds gave Ancho or Basajaun a portion of bread as nightly offerings (cf. § Ancho and the cowherds).

The Basajaun sometimes appears in the stories as a terrifying man of the forest with prodigious strength and surpassing agility (swifter than a stag) whom it was better not to run into.

Basajaun is also said to have been the world's first farmer who taught mankind how to cultivate cereals. Basajaun was also the world's first blacksmith and miller, from whom mankind stole the secrets of making the saw, making the mill axle, and the art of welding. Alternatively, it was the trickster San Martin Txiki who acquired these various skills from them, which he subsequently taught to humans.

The Basajaun was also thought to build megalithic structures, or at least toponymy suggests his kindred were responsible for building dolmens, etc. In Ataun, there are many dolmen sites found in the mountainous terrain, dubbed Jentiletxe or "house of the Jentil", while on Mt. Saadar in Zegama, such dolmens are called Tartaloetxéta or "house of the Tartalo", and there is a geological formation (an arroyo) that is named Basajaundegi or "residence of the Basajaun" found in the Aratz-Erreka district of Azpeitia.

Naturally, the beginnings of Christianity (Kixmi) and the spread of technology coincide with the period when the Romans came to the Basque Country.

Some scholars have suggested that the Basajaun myth might be a folk memory of early human contact with Neanderthal populations in the Iberian Peninsula.

== Folktales ==
In one tale, billed as the only depiction of the Basajaun as a "vampire", (Note: Vaz Da Silva, after Webster (1877), p. 52n.) the wild man (Basa-Jaun) accepts three boys and a girl as servants, but the girl grows thin because he comes each evening demanding her to poke her finger through the door, and he has been sucking on the finger, which has been the cause of her languor. The children push the wild man down the ravine. But the wild woman (Basa-Andre) instructs the girl to place three large teeth in the warm water the girl uses to wash her brother's feet, and the boys turn into oxen. But the girl eventually finds an opportunity to threaten the wild woman into confessing how to undo the spell with three hazel rods.

=== The candlestick of the St. Saviour ===
The tale "Le Chandelier de Saint-Saveur (The candlestick of the St. Saviour)" is given in two versions. In the Mendive version, a farmhand named Hacherihargaix (fox-hard-to-catch) steals the candlestick of the Basa Andere and is pursued by her father, the Basa Jaun. When the thief reaches the (chapel of) Saint-Saveur, the bell rings, and this somehow causes the wild man to spare the thief's life and not devour him until the next opportunity, which will be when the man is fasting. One day the thief is doing farm work without having eaten and spots the lord of the wilderness coming. He manages to find four grains of wheat in his hair and starts chewing, which makes the Basa Jaun go away for good. (Note: The orally told versions redacted in Basque language are appended, Cerquand (1875a), pp. 279–280. The second "Camou-Suhast" version has lamiña instead of the Basa Andere.) This notion held by the Basque that the act of eating should have certain mystical powers has been seen as rather peculiar. (Note: Ralston doesn't explicitly say this is peculiar or "strange", but he follows this comment with another, prefaced as "another strange idea.." (taboo against night work, see below))

=== Three truths ===
In the tale "Three Truths", published in French by Julien Vinson (1883), when the shepherds move their encampment to lower altitude, they forget to bring their grill which they use to cook dough on. The reward of 5 sous is offered to whoever volunteers to retrieve it. The shepherd who accepts encounters the Basa-Jaun baking bread on it. The wild man will return the implement if the shepherd tells three truths, which he does (even a full moon is not really as bright as day, even a well-made méture (galette made of corn, (Note: Or in the Basque text, simply "good maize (Basque: arto on)".)) is not really as good as wheat bread, and the shepherd would not have come if he knew the Basa-Jaun would be there). The Basa-Jaun admits the bargain is met and offers the advice: never take a night job for pay, one should sooner do it for free. (Note: "I. Les trois Vérités" Told by Mr. Barhendi of Musculdy. Originally Cerquand (1876b), "31. [Les Trois Vérités (version de Musculdy)]", 2: 29, note (1), reprinted from Cerquand (1876a), p. 203, n (1); Basque text: Cerquand (1876a), pp. 245–246) (Note: A Basque version from Gipuzkoa province, with Spanish translation has also been printed (together with Vinson's French text).) Taboo against working nights for pay is part of Basque tradition (remarked as being "another strange idea"), and the theme occurs in a different tale where the girl who breaches the prohibition by taking a night job for 5 sous and loses her life.

=== One-eyed basajaun blinded ===
In the tale "Basajaun Blinded", two soldiers on furlough encounter a one-eyed Basa-Jaun, and one of them is skewered on a spit, roasted, and eaten straightaway. The survivor, who is saved for later, sneaks up to the sleeping Basa-Jaun and drives the red hot spit through the giant's eye. Although the soldier now has a sporting chance to escape, he is tricked by the giant's gift of a ring, which starts screaming "Here I am", and which cannot be removed. The soldier cuts off the ring with his finger and throws it in a stream. Basa-Jaun dives in after and drowns. (Note: "X. Basa-Jaun aveuglé" Told by Jean Sallaber of Aussurucq. Originally Cerquand (1878), "52. Le Tartare et Les Deux Soldats (Version d'Aussurucq.) A." Volume 3, pp. ??, reprinted after Cerquand (1877), pp. 452–453; Basque text: Cerquand (1877), pp. 502–504.) One-eyedness is actually the typical feature of the Tartalo (Tartaro) aka Torto, (Note: Torto, Anxo Torto, Anxo, and Alarabi) and the lore of the Tartalo and Basajaun are often mixed up, as already noted. In fact, there is another version of this tale where a Tartaro is the blinded enemy, and the same talking ring motif occurs. The narrative resembles the story concerning Ulysses and the cyclops Polyphemus in the Greek epic, The Odyssey. (Note: Archibald H. Sayce writes that according to Antoine d'Abbadie, there is a version of this story where the hero fights with a "soul without a body", and that Webster has alluded to this also.)

=== External soul ===
There is a story entitled "Malbrouk" in the version edited by Webster, which is thought not to be a native Basque tale but borrowed from Celtic tradition, just one of many such borrowings involving "external soul" and "animal helpers" motifs, though similar stories are found in other cultures, e.g. Magyars (Hungary).

Here Malbrouk is the name of both hero and the villain, his godfather and kidnapper. In this version, the hero escapes and later must defeat a "body without a soul", by going on a side-quest to find the egg (presumably the monster's external soul) inside the pigeon inside the fox, nested within the wolf, and to strike that egg on the "body without a soul", which is the only way to kill it. The hero is aided by the ability to transform into a wolf, dog, hawk, etc. a power conferred by his helper animals.

There is a version of this legend featuring a "wild Tartaro" as the villain, according to Antoine d'Abbadie.

An obvious cognate tale was edited with French translation by Cerquand (1882), "Les animaux secourables, et le corps sans ame (Helper animals and the body without a soul)", categorized as Aarne-Thompson type 302 "The Giant Whose Heart Was In an Egg". (Note: Or ATU 302 "Ogre's (Devil's) Heart in the Egg". "Conte-type 302: Les animaux secourables et le Corps sans âme".) The hero (here a fisherman) unknowingly enters the service of Basa Jaun in danger of being eaten. Alerted by a captured maiden, he goes on his side quest of defeating the dragon (Eren-Sugué, Herensuge, Heren-Suge) because nested inside it is the hare containing the dove containing the two eggs that are the Basa Jaun's soul. The hero here also can transform into a bear to kill the dragon, greyhound to chase the hare, and crow to snatch the dove to accomplish his quest. Cerquand notes similarity to the Scottish tale "The Young King of Easaidh Ruadh" as well as other cognates. Similarity to the Norwegian tale "The Giant Who Had No Heart in His Body" edited by Dasent is also mentioned as resembling a variant version.

=== Kidnapping and failed rescue ===
In the tale "Basa Jaun the kidnapper, disappointed", the basajaun abducts a shepherdess and keeps her at his hole (Ancho's Hole). The people of Béhorléguy attempt a rescue armed with crosses and holy objects and successfully liberate her, but when the lord of the wilderness tells her to turn around, she drops dead. (Note: The variant "71. Le Basa Jaun ravisseur et déçu (2e Version Mendive)" was later appended Cerquand (1877), p. 494.) This clearly parallels the myth of Orpheus and Eurydice.

=== Ancho and the cowherds ===
There is a story from Estérençuby (Esterenzubi) about Ancho, the lord of the wilderness (Basajaun), receiving a portion of bread from the evening meal as offering by the cowherds. He would arrive at night and eat the offering while the herdsmen were asleep. One night, only the youngest cowherd offered the bread, and the others were punished by Ancho who stole their clothing. The youngest was asked to retrieve the clothes in exchange for the payment of a scrawny heifer. Ancho instructed the youth to strike the cow with a hazel rod a 101 times, and the youth now owned a whole herd of 101 cattle besides the single cow. (Note: The story ends with the statement that the Basajaun was conversant with the Christians at that time.)

== Comparative mythology ==
The Basajaun (var. basojaun, basayaun) is considered a variety of "wild man", (Note: French: homme sauvage.) or the Basa Andre with "wild woman", each comparable with the ogre and ogress. Various cultures across Europe have their own unique concept of the "wild man" with distinct names and folklore.

A comparison has been made between Basajaun and the Roman god Silvanus, (Note: Leeming citing Blazquiez, "Basque Religion" Translated by Erica Melzer, in The Encyclopedia of Religion. 2:80) although it is the salvan or salvang, the wild man of Lombardy, which is linguistically derived from Silvanus. Silvanus was more fully known as "Silvanus sylvestris deus" who protected forests and plantations and "Silvanus agrestis" who safeguarded shepherds from harm. This pattern is also common among the different variations of the wild man myth.

Like the Jentil, the Basajaun is a large, hairy, wild man who lived in dark jungles and deep caves, but unlike them, he is very wise. The Basajaun is said to have been among the last of the surviving Jentilak during the arrival of Christianity. He is presented as the protective genius of the flocks, and when a storm approaches, he roars for the shepherds to protect the flock. He also prevents wolves from getting close to the herd. He has also been depicted as a fearsome and evil man of great strength.

Similarity between the Brazilian legendary creature pé de garrafa ("bottle foot") which leaves footprints like the bottom of a bottle and the round footprinted basajaun (as described by Vinson) has also been noted by Luís da Câmara Cascudo.

== Iconography ==
Late medieval carving depicts the basajaun at the Cathedral of Saint Mary of Burgos.

== See also ==
- Jean de l'Ours
- Jentil
- Tartalo
- Leshy
- Wild man
- Green Man
- Troll
- Dryad
- Yeti
- Bigfoot
- Hominid cryptids

== Bibliography ==
- Barandiaran, Jose Migel (1973) [1922]. Eusko-Mitologia. Obras completas II (in Spanish). Bilbao: Editorial La Gran Encïclopedia Vasca. ISBN 9788424801922.
- Barandiaran, Jose Migel (1960). Mitología vasca (in Spanish). Madrid: Editorial La Gran Enciclopedia Vasca. pp. 75–76.
- Barandiaran, Jose Migel (2007). Altuna, Jesús (ed.). Selected Writings of José Miguel de Barandiarán: Basque Prehistory and Ethnography. Center for Basque Studies, University of Nevada, Reno. ISBN 9781877802706.
- Cerquand, Jean-François [in French] (1875a). "Légendes & récits populaires du Pays Basque". Bulletin de la Société des Sciences, Lettres et Arts de Pau. 4: 233–289.
  - —— (1876a). "Légendes & récits populaires du Pays Basque". Bulletin de la Société des Sciences, Lettres et Arts de Pau. 5.
  - —— (1877). "Légendes & récits populaires du Pays Basque". Bulletin de la Société des Sciences, Lettres et Arts de Pau. 6.
  - —— (1882a). "Légendes & récits populaires du Pays Basque". Bulletin de la Société des Sciences, Lettres et Arts de Pau. 11.
- Cerquand, Jean-François [in French] (1875b). "7. Le Chandelier de Saint-Saveur". Légendes et récits populaires du pays basque. Vol. 1. Pau: Léon Ribaut. pp. 22–27.
  - —— (1876b). "33. Le Basa Jaun ravisseur et déçu (Version de Mendive)". Légendes et récits populaires du pays basque. Vol. 2. Pau: Léon Ribaut. pp. 34–36.
  - —— (1882b). "98.[→96a] Les animaux secourables, et le corps sans ame (Version de Bustince Iriberry); 98. L'Aventurier, Les Animaux Secourables et le Corps sans Ame (Version de Mendive)". Légendes et récits populaires du pays basque. Vol. 4. Pau: Léon Ribaut. pp. 62–67, 72–76.
- Mazur, Oleh (1966). The Wild Man in the Spanish Renaissance and Golden Age Theater: A Comparative Study. University of Pennsylvania.
- Vinson, Julien (1883). "I. Les trois Vérité; IX. Basa-Jaun attrapé; X. Basa-Jaun aveuglé". Le Folklore du Pays basque. Paris: Maisonneuve et Larose. pp. 10–11, 42–45; (alt e-text@BnF)
- Webster, Wentworth (1877). Basque Legends. Griffith and Farran.
