= Galtxagorriak =

Galtxagorrii
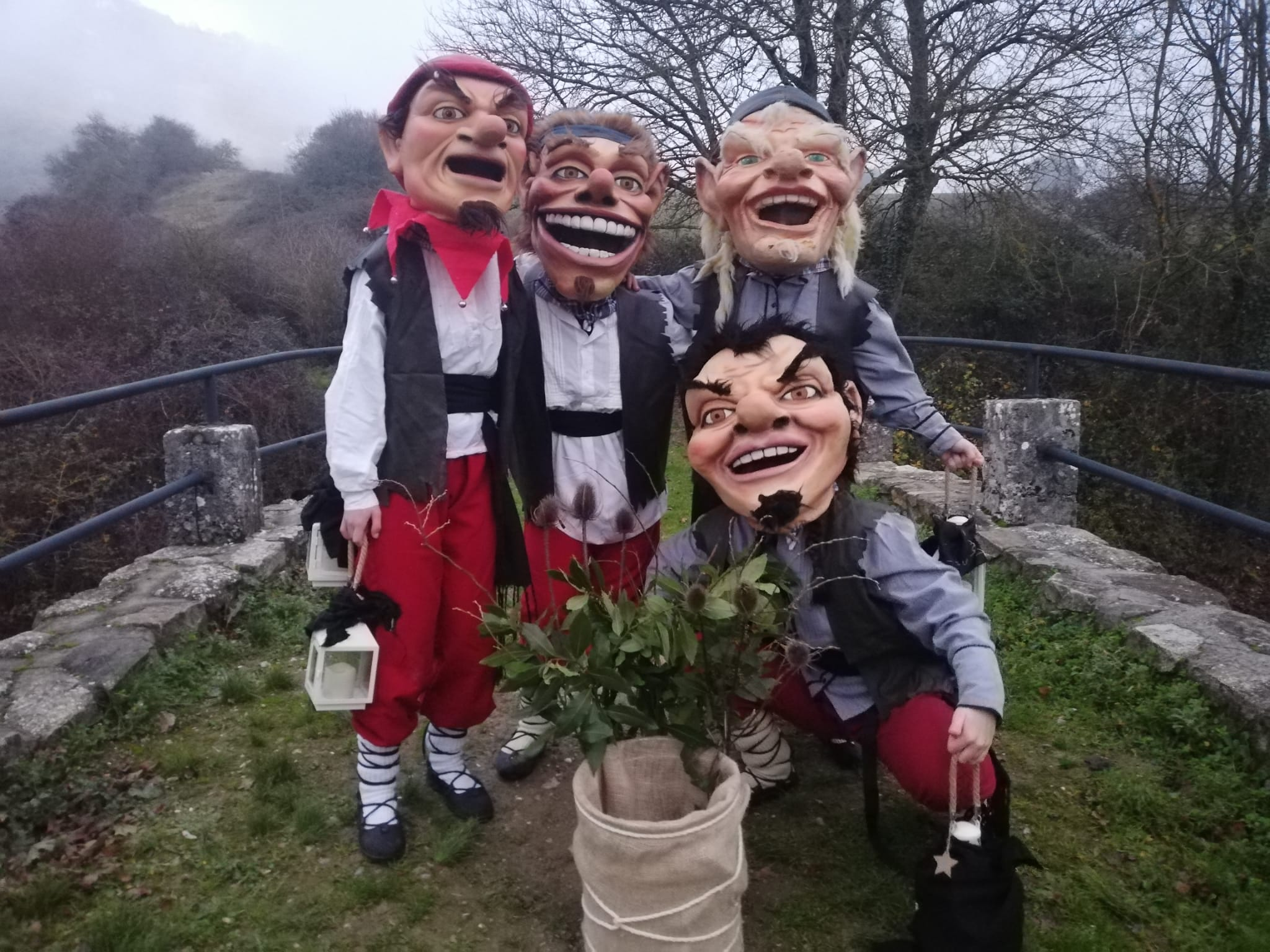
- A group of people dressed as galtzagorriak

Creature information
- Other name(s): Galtzagorrii; Prakagorris
- Grouping: House spirits Imps
- Similar entities: Brownie; Domovoy; Kobold; Lutin

Origin
- Region: Basque country

Galtxagorriak (singular Galtxagorrii, Basque pronunciation: [ɡaltʃagoriak]), also called Galtzagorrii or Prakagorris, are a type of iratxoak (imp) or house spirit in Basque folklore. The name "Galtxagorriak" translates to "red-pants".

== Description and folklore ==
Galtxagorriak are described as tiny, sometimes winged, humanoids wearing red pants. In folklore, they can be kept in boxes, pincushions, and other containers. If a person places a container on top of a bush on Saint John's Eve, then they will enter the box and the person who placed it will become their master.

They can complete tasks extremely quickly, and can become angry if they run out of chores or are given a truly impossible task. One story has a man who bought a box of galtxagorriak to do his chores, but they became enraged and undid all their work once he ran out of tasks for them. In another story, a man gets annoyed by his galtxagorriak and tells them to bring him a seive full of water and once they figured out it couldn't be done, they left. If treated well, they stay with their human and help them with difficult or impossible tasks. Another story tells of a farmer from Zarautz who was losing a ox-race. He asked his galtxagorriak to help carry the stones his ox had to drag, and they helped him win the race.

Galtxagorriak are also considered to be assistants of sorcerers and wizards, and are used to explain extraordinary feats.

== Popular culture ==
The 2016 animated film Teresa eta Galtzagorri (English title: Elf on the Run) by Basque film company Dibulitoon Studio features a young galtzagorri named Tim as a main character. In the film, galtxagorriak are creatures that bring about springtime rather than house spirits. Teresa eta Galtzagorri received nominations for Best Animated Film at the Goya Awards, the Cinema Writers Circle Awards, and the Platino Awards.
