= Anxo =

Anxo may refer to:

- Anxo, a given name in Galician and Languedocien Occitan derived from Angel.
- Anxo, another name for the Tartaro.
