= Aatxe =

Spirit from Basque folk mythology

Aatxe (pronounced [a.atʃe]; a contraction of aratxe) is a spirit in the folk mythology of the Basque people. His name is literally translated as "Young Bull", and he is sometimes known as Etsai. He is a cave-dwelling spirit who adopts the form of a young red bull, but being a shapeshifter, sometimes takes the shape of a man. Aatxe is also described as a shapeshifter that may appear not only as a bull but also as a cow or calf. At night, more so in stormy weather, he arises from the hollow which is his lair. He attacks criminals and other malevolent people. He also protects people by making them stay home when danger is near.

He is theorized to be a representative of the goddess Mari, or may be an enforcer of her will, punishing people who cheat her. Another name for him is Aatxegorri which means "young red bull". It is believed Aatxe inhabited caves and hollows; in many (Isturits, Sare, Errenteria, among others) engravings and paintings depicting aurochs, bulls, and oxen have been found; which implies that this Basque myth has its origins in the Paleolithic. Other caves associated with Aatxe include Sagastigorri and Covairada, which appear in regional Basque folklore.
