= San Martin Txiki =

San Martin Txiki ("Little Saint Martin") is the trickster figure from Basque mythology. Txiki (pronounced "cheeky" [ˈt͡ʃiːki]) means "little" in an affectionate sense. San Martin Txiki is often called simply Martintxiki or Samartitxiki. He stole the secrets of planting, sowing, and harvesting from the Basajaunak (lords of the woods). He also invented the first saws, modeling them after the edges of the chestnut leaf. San Martin Txiki shows similarities to Thor and Loki of Norse Mythology as the Basajaunak he tricks are similar to the Jötunn that they trick.

San Martin Txiki also exists in Aragonese mythology in the valleys of Tena, Ansó and Broto (places where local toponymy derives from Basque) under the name San Martinico.

== Legends ==
One of the most well-known stories of San Martin Txiki is of how he brought wheat seeds to humans. It is said that the Basajaunak kept all the wheat for themselves, so San Martin Txiki bet them that he could he could jump over a pile of wheat seeds without touching it. The Basajaunak were able to jump over easily, but San Martin Txiki fell into the pile. However, he had worn large shoes that day, and collected some wheat seeds in them when he fell in. The Basajaunak were so busy laughing at him that they didn't notice, and he brought the seeds back to the humans.

He is also said to have gotten the secret of soldering from the Basajaunak by having one of his servants tell them he had already figured it out. The Basajaunak revealed how it was done, and the servant relayed the information to him. He got the knowledge of making saws in a similar manner. The Basajaunak asked his servant if he had been inspired by the shape of chestnut leaves. The servant told him what they had said, and San Martin Txiki was then able to make one himself. Angered, the Basajaunak went to his workshop and bent the teeth of the saw in an attempt to break it, but this only made it stronger.
