= Iratxoak =

Imps of Basque mythology

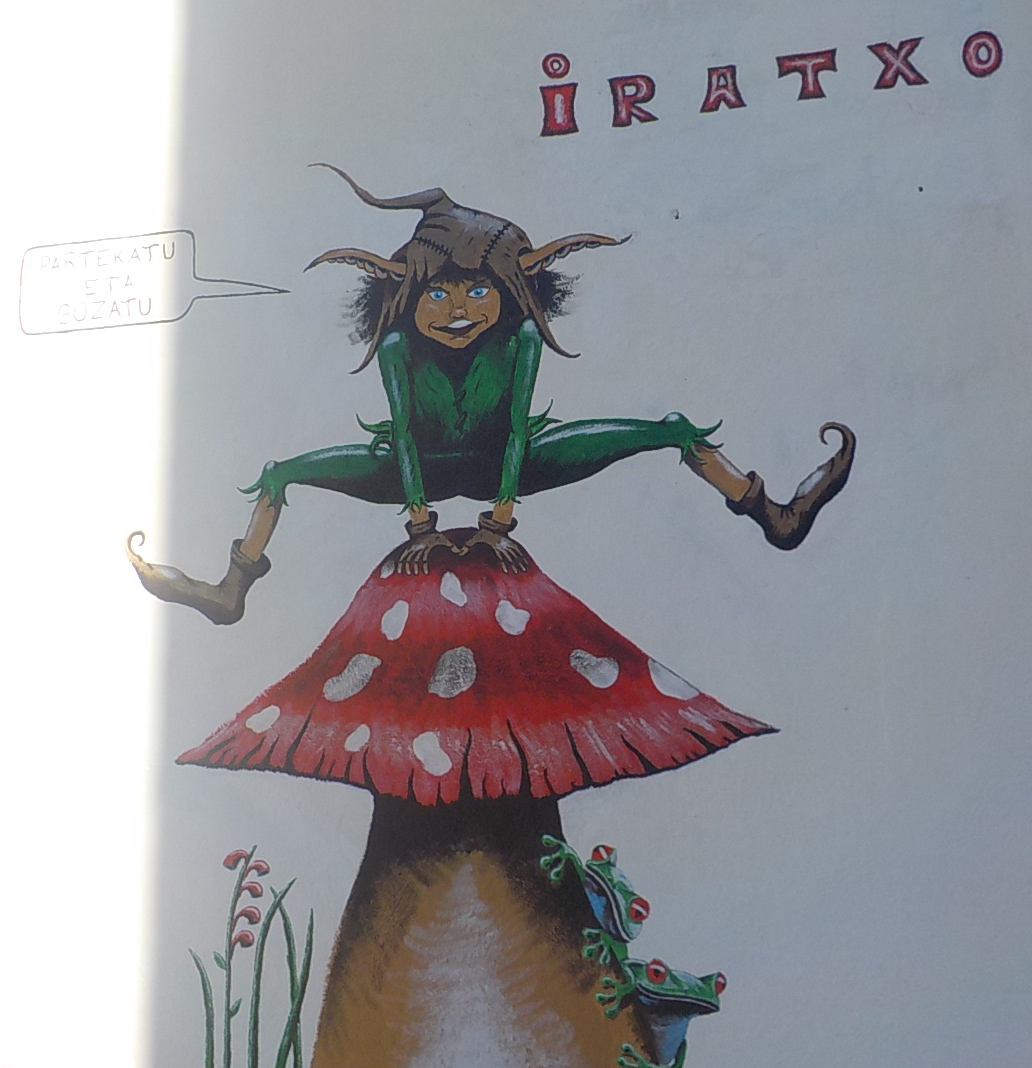
Iratxo

Iratxoak (sing.: iratxo) are the imps of Basque mythology. Other names for them include irelsuzko/irelzuzko, irelu, irelixu/ireltxu, and iretxo. They are generally considered the Basque equivalent of goblins or fairies, although a French-Basque dictionary from 1926 translates the word iratxo as spectre (ghost). They are said to assist in household and farming tasks if treated well. If offended, iratxoak may cause the offender minor troubles or target them with tricks.

They are said to be found in many places, including forests, caves, and ruins. In some legends, iratxoak are associated with hidden treasure. Iratxoak are considered to be nocturnal.

During Saint John's Eve festivities, people dressed as iratxoak may collect wishes and unwanted thoughts from attendees and toss them into a bonfire.

== Subtypes ==
=== Galtxagorriak ===
Galtxagorriak are a house spirit variety of iratxo that are more helpful to humans. Their name translates to "red-pants".

=== Intxisu ===
Intxisu are sometimes considered a type of iratxo commonly associated with cromlechs. It is unknown if the name has any relation to intxa-ur or avellana de los Intxi, two Basque terms for walnut.

== Etymology ==
Some scholars believe that the word iratxo may be related to the word irasco, meaning "castrated goat".

== Popular culture ==
Iratxo is also the name of a rock/ska band from Lavapiés, Madrid. The name comes from the nickname of their lead singer, Juan "Iratxo" Manuel Cifuentes.
