= Tartalo =

Basque mythological figure

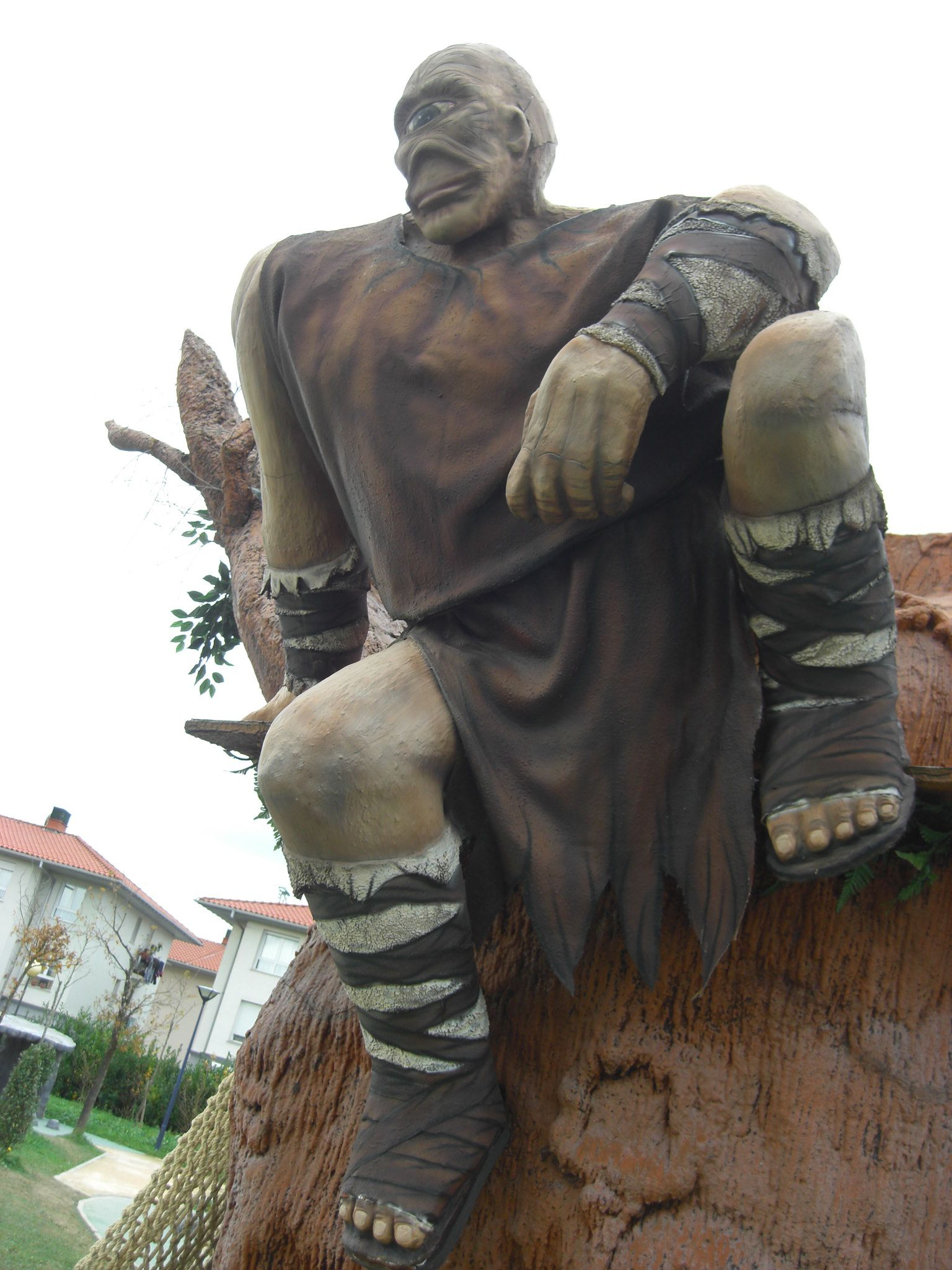
Tartalo, in the Izenaduba Basoa amusement park in Mungia (Biscay).

Tartaro, Tartalo, or Torto in Basque mythology, is an enormously strong one-eyed giant very similar to the Greek Cyclops that Odysseus faced in Homer's Odyssey. He is said to live in caves in the mountains and catches young people in order to eat them; in some accounts he eats sheep also.

Alarabi is another name for the creature. Anxo (or Ancho) may also be equivalent, but some sources say this is another name for the Basajaun.

== Names ==
Tartaro (or Tartaroa) is the form given in some translated tales and commentary in French and English. (Note: Julien Vinson and Wentworth Webster, who were collaborators.)

Torto, Anxo and Alarabi (Note: Alarabi is a form seen in Biscay.) were the forms listed in Jose Migel Barandiaran's Basque Mythology, with "Tartalo" described as a local variant particular to the Zegama region. Tartalo being a proper name was an idea floated by Barandiaran; but here is an example of a tale in which three Tartaros appear.

Anxo or Ancho is however explained as an alternate name for Basajaun by some sources. Webster ventured that "Ancho" derived from "Sancho".

== Origins ==
Tartaro has been described as the Basque equivalent to the cyclops Polyphemus, and similarity to this cyclops in Homer's Odyssey is compelling given the context of him being blinded by a spit and the hero of the myth escaping from the giant's cave dressed in sheepskin, however direct derivation from Homeric sources may not be necessarily involved

Cerquand in his book "Légendes et récits populaires du Pays basque, volume 1" (1875) suggested in an annotation that the name "Tartaro" (Note: Or "Tartaroa") derived from the Tartar people citing adaptations of Charles Perrault's stories Cinderella, Hop-o'-My-Thumb and Donkeyskin in the context of basque folklore, stories in which a giant named Tartaroa isn't simply a man-eating creature but now specifically "sniffs christians" in order to eat them :

"Deux contes, que j'ai reçus d'Arhansus après mon travail terminé, justifient ce rapprochement. Cendrillon, le petit Poucet et Peau-d'Ane même ont pénétré chez les Basques, et il ne sera pas sans intérêt d'étudier ce qu'y sont devenues les gracieuses inventions de Perrault. Je me contente de faire remarquer aujourd'hui que l'Ogre, dans la version d'Aransus, est un Tartare, (Tartaroa), et qu'au lieu de sentir la chair fraîche, il sent le chrétien, détail déjà noté. La fée, qui équipe si gentiment Cendrillon est remplacée par la Sainte-Vierge. Il est entendu qu'avec cette substitution, Cendrillon ne peut aller au bal. C'est à la messe qu'elle attire l'attention du seigneur (Jauna)."

Wentworth Webster agrees given the late mention of the name "Tartaroa" (13th century) comparing it with the French word "ogre" supposedly derived from "Hungarians", but expresses doubts on the further explanations given by Cerquand .

== Characteristics ==
Tartaro according to folktale tradition is a huge, one-eyed being, usually cave-dwelling, capturing young folk or those who sought shelter in his cave, and devouring them. In one oral account, the Tartaro ate one whole sheep each day.

== Themes ==
A mystical ring is a common theme in the Tartalo/Tartaro tales. In one version, the Tartaro (a prince turned monster who needed a bride to turn back) makes a gift of a ring to a girl, and it turns out to be a "talking ring"; she cuts off her finger to rid herself of it, and the monster. Webster noted this ring motif had its parallel in the Celtic (Scottish Gaelic) Conall Cra Bhuidhe ("Conall Yellowclaw"), published by John Francis Campbell, but none to be found in classical sources.

The motif of the hero blinding Tartaro has both a classical and Celtic (Irish) parallel: Oddyseus blinding the cyclops Polyphemus in Homer's Odyssey and Lug hurling a spear or projectile into the eye of Balor.

== Story ==
One day, while two brothers of the Antimuño baserri were hunting, a storm broke, so they decided to take refuge from the rain in a cave, which was Tartalo's cave. Soon after, Tartalo appeared with his flock of sheep. He saw the two brothers and said: "one for today and the other for tomorrow".

That same day he cooked and ate the eldest one, and then, he went to sleep. While he was sleeping, the youngest brother stole Tartalo's ring and then he stuck the roasting spit in his only eye. Tartalo was blind, but not dead yet.

He started to look for the boy among his sheep, but he put on a sheep's skin and escaped from Tartalo. But, unluckily, when he got out of the flock of sheep, the accuser ring started to shout: "Here I am, here I am!".

Tartalo got out of his cave and he started to run after the ring, hearing its shouts. The young one wasn't able to take off the ring, so, when he arrived to the edge of a cliff, he cut off his finger, and since Tartalo was near, he decided to throw it down the cliff. Tartalo, following the ring's shouting, fell off the cliff.

== See also ==
- Cyclops
- Polyphemus
- Giant
- Stallo
- Troll
- Ogre
