= Lamia (Basque mythology) =

Creature from Basque mythology

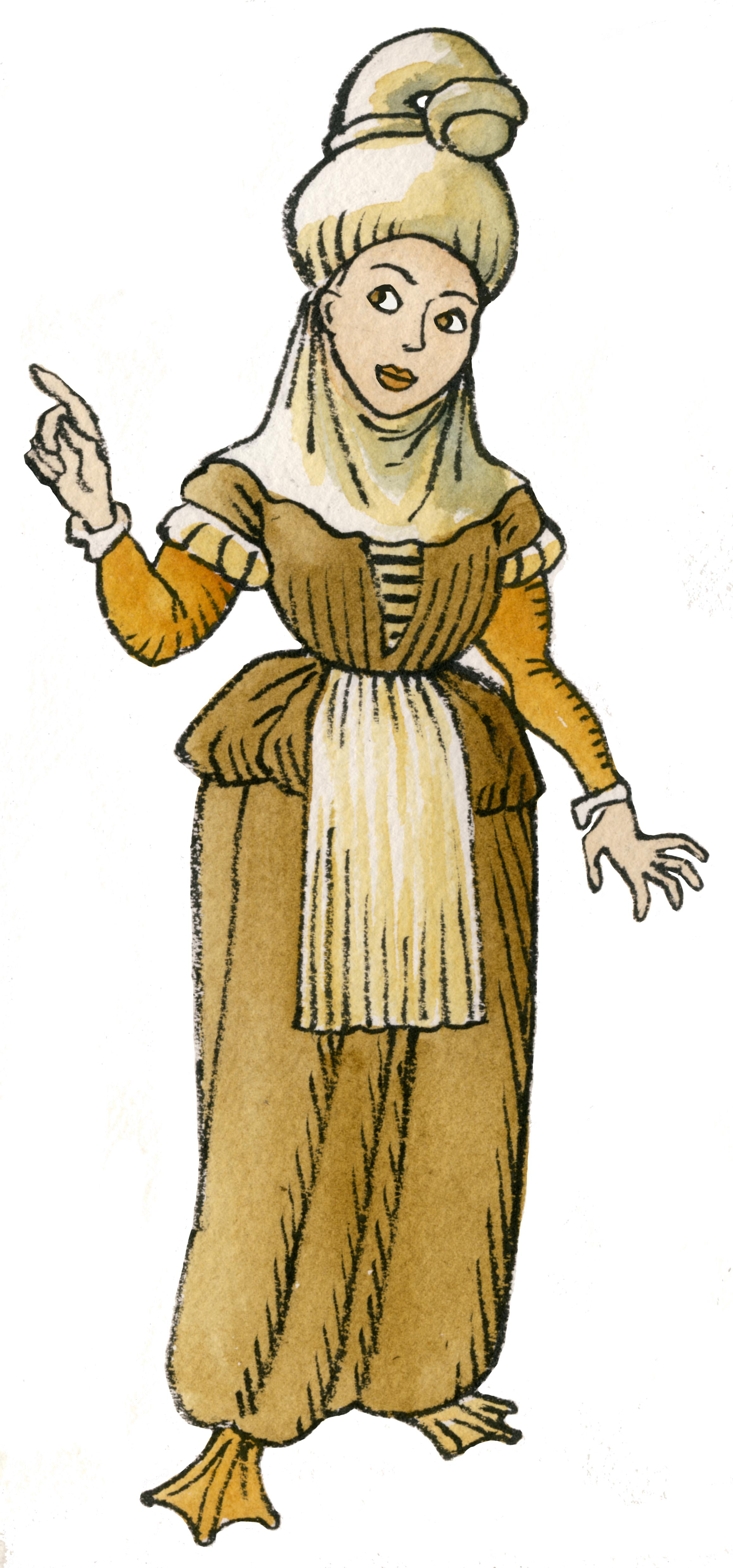
Basque lamina

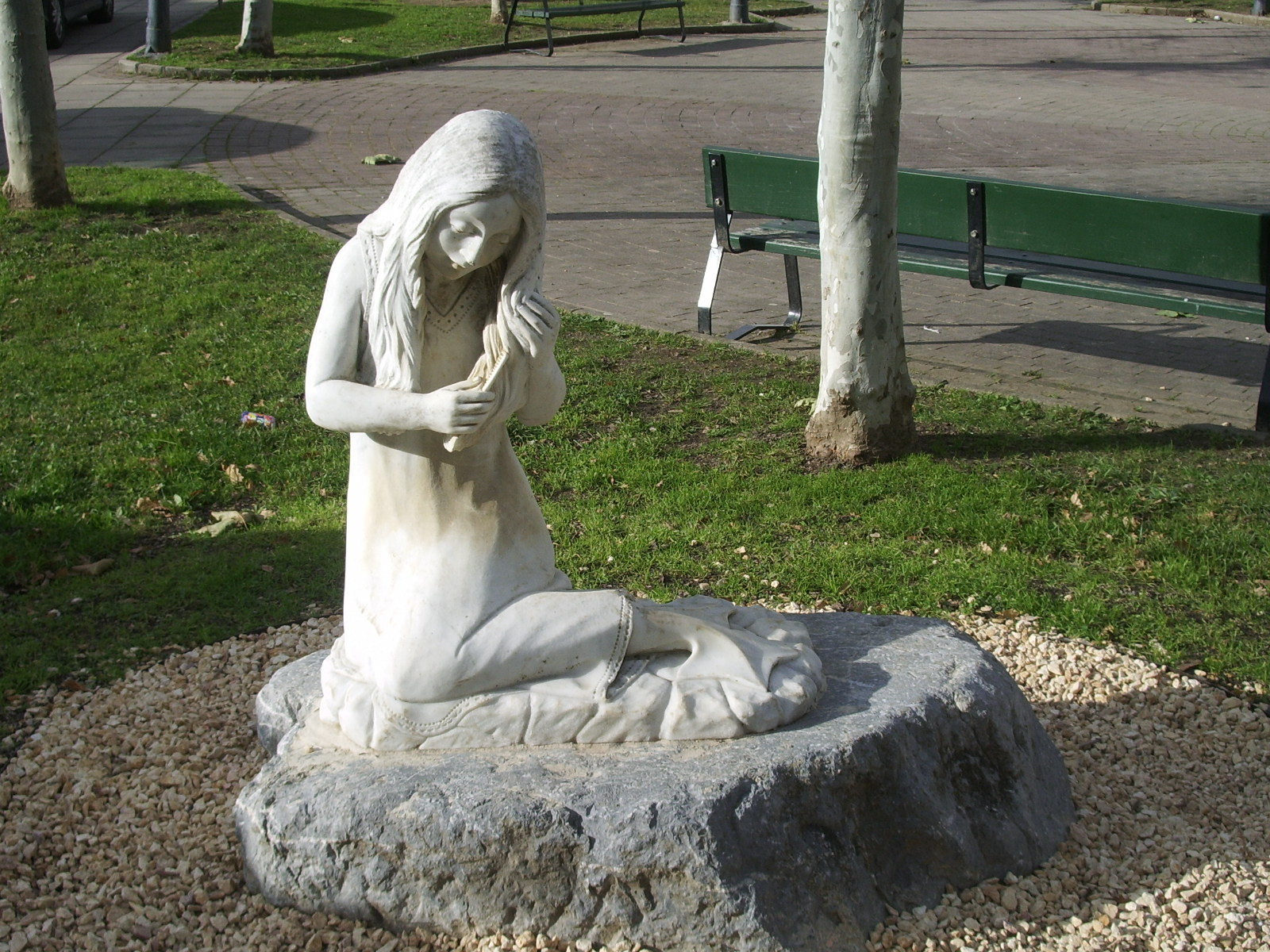
Sculpture of a lamina in Garagartza, Arrasate, Gipuzkoa

The lamia (or lamina) (plural: lamiak or laminak) is a siren or nereid-like creature in Basque mythology. Lamiak are typically portrayed as living in and around rivers. They are depicted as beautiful, long-haired women with webbed duck feet, usually found at the river shore brushing their hair with a golden comb and seducing men.

Mythology in coastal areas includes itsaslamiak, a variety of lamiak who live in the sea and have fish-like tails, similar to a mermaid.

== Beliefs ==
Basque mythology depicts lamiak as generous, aiding those who give them presents by helping them at work. For example, if a farmer were to leave food for them at the river shore, they would eat it at night and in exchange finish ploughing his field. In some places, bridges were believed to have been built at night by lamiak, for example at Ebrain (Bidarrai, Lower Navarre), Azalain (Andoain, Gipuzkoa), Urkulu (Aretxabaleta, Gipuzkoa), Liginaga-Astüe (Labourd).

In other myths, lamiak must leave if the bridge that they were building at night remains unfinished at cockcrow. People believed that lamiak had left a river if a stone in the bridge was missing. Other beliefs claim that most lamiak disappeared when men built small churches in the forest.

Lamiak are also believed to be found on the other side of rainbows, where they are combing their hair. It is said that when the sunlight strikes their hair, the rainbow opens.

Mythology also occasionally describes male lamiak. In those stories, they are described as strong and are attributed with the creation of dolmens at night. It is also said that they can enter a house at night when its inhabitants are sleeping. They are given different names: Maideak, Mairiak, Mairuak, Intxixuak (in Oiartzun, Gipuzkoa), Saindi Maidi (in Lower Navarre).

Many toponyms relate to lamiak, including Lamikiz (Markina), Laminaputzu (in Zeanuri), Lamitegi (in Bedaio), Lamirain (in Arano), Lamusin (in Sare), Lamiñosin (in Ataun).

== See also ==
- Basajaun
- Glaistig – Ghost from Scottish mythology
- Mari
- Sorginak
