= Pierre de Lancre =

French judge and witchhunter (1553–1631)

Pierre de Rosteguy de Lancre or Pierre de l'Ancre, Lord of De Lancre (1553–1631), was the French judge of Bordeaux who conducted the massive Labourd witch-hunt of 1609. In 1582 he was named judge in Bordeaux, and in 1608 King Henry IV commanded him to put an end to the practice of witchcraft in Labourd, in the French part of the Basque Country, where over four months he sentenced to death several dozen persons.

He wrote three books on witchcraft, analysing the Sabbath, lycanthropy, and sexual relationships during the Sabbath. In his opinion, Satan had little sexual intercourse with single women, because he preferred married women for that implied also adultery, and the incest between mothers and sons at the end of the Sabbath was essential to give birth to demonic children, as well as a sexual act between a witch and a he-goat (believed to be Satan present at the reunion). He also thought that Satan was pleased with a clean body but not a clean (or pure) soul, inducing people to wash their bodies and embellish themselves with ornaments.

== Views ==
His grandfather, Bernard de Rostegui (cf. Basque surname Aroztegi, 'home of the smith'), a native of Lower Navarre, had changed his Basque surname for the French one of de Lancre upon migrating to Bordeaux. This familial denial seems to have influenced him into a deep hate against everything Basque. He considered Basques to be ignorant, superstitious, proud and irreligious. Basque women were in his eyes libertines and seductive and Basque priests were for him just womanizers with no religious zeal. He believed that the root of the natural Basque tendency towards evil was love of dance. All these prejudices are reflected in his work Tableau de l'Inconstance des Mauvais Anges et Demons, published in 1612, not long after the process.

Quoting from the Tableau at length, P.G. Maxwell-Stuart clarifies De Lancre's legal orientation on the evidence of witchcraft in Labourd:

The confessions of male and female witches are in agreement with indicia so strong that one can maintain they are genuine, real, and neither deceptive nor illusory. This relieves judges of any misgiving they may have. For when they confess to infanticide, parents find their children have been suffocated or their blood completely sucked out of them. When they confess to digging up corpses and violating the sacred nature of graves, one discovers that bodies have been torn from their graves and are no longer found where they had been put. When they confess they have given a piece of their clothing to Satan as a pledge, one finds this tell-tale scrap upon their person. When they say they have cast evil on such and such a person or animal, (and sometimes they confess they have cured them), it is self-evident they have been subject to malefice, they have been wounded, or they have been cured. Consequently, this is not an illusion. Here is the first rule which makes us see clearly what the witch has done, either through her confession strengthened by compelling indicia and very great, very strong presumptions, or by irreproachable witnesses. (Tableau Book 6, discourse 5, section 5, in Maxwell-Stuart's Witch Hunters: Professional Prickers, Unwitchers and Witch Finders of the Renaissance, 2003, 1st ed., p. 33)

In 1622, he published a second book: L'incredulité et mescreance du sortilège, that is an extension of his first one. Thanks to these books we know something of what happened in the process that de Lancre directed against the people of Labourd, because the judicial records vanished during the French Revolution.

P.G. Maxwell-Stuart writes on De Lancre in his Witch Hunters that:

...L'incredulité et mescreance du sortilège plainement convaicue (1622), produced twelve years after his long personal engagement with witches and witchcraft, spends an impressive amount of learning upon showing that magic of any kind is not an illusion and should not be dismissed by those who are pleased to think otherwise. This work aroused the ire of Gabriel Naudé, at one time physician to Louis XIII and later librarian to Cardinal Barberini, who in 1625 published a fierce response, Apologie pour tous les grands personages qui ont esté faussement soupçonnés de magie, to which De Lancre, duly irritated, replied two years later with his final work, Du sortilège. (p. 38)

On reconsidering de Lancre and his works, Professor Jonathan Pearl says the following in his Crime of Crimes: Demonology and Politics in France 1560–1620:

As already indicated, many historians have described de Lancre as a ridiculous obsessed fanatic. Terms like "gleeful," "gloating," "infantile," "sadistic" and "bigoted" have all been applied to him. But in his writing, de Lancre constantly emphasized the distastefulness of the task in which he was engaged. Certainly, he believed totally the testimony that he heard, sentenced people to death based on that testimony, and worked to convince his colleagues to follow his lead. But there is little evidence in his work to support the picture that has so often been drawn. (p. 142-143)

And that:

It would also be a mistake [...] to dismiss de Lancre as a crank, a bizarre or ridiculous figure. He was an earnest advocate of a worldview that was not insignificant in his time. He took seriously his instruction from respectable orthodox scholars, and did not waver from them for his long life. (p. 147)

== Works ==
- Tableau de l'inconstance des mauvais anges et démons. Paris, 1612
- On the Inconstancy of Witches: Pierre de Lancre's Tableau de l'inconstance des mauvais anges et demons (1612) edited by Gerhild Scholz Williams, 2006 (first English translation). ISBN 0-86698-352-X
- L'incredulité et mescréance du sortilège. Paris, 1622
- Du Sortilège. 1627 (rare and less well-known work as reported by Montague Summers in his The History of Witchcraft)

== See also ==
- Witch-hunt
- Sorginak (Basque witches)
- Inquisition
- Witchcraft and children
