= Labourd witch-hunt of 1609 =

1609 witch trials in France

The Labourd witch-hunt of 1609 took place in Labourd, French Basque Country, in 1609. The investigation was managed by Pierre de Lancre on the order of King Henry IV of France and III of Navarre. It resulted in the execution of 70 people.

== History ==
The area suffered from instability after the French religious wars.

The process began with a dispute between the Lord of Urtubi and some people who had accused him and his men of being witches. This dispute evolved in sporadic fight and soon the authorities of Donibane-Lohizune asked for the intervention of the Judge of Bourdeaux, who happened to be de Lancre.

In less than a year some 70 people were burnt at the stake, among them several priests. De Lancre wasn't satisfied: he estimated that some 3,000 witches were still at large (10% of the population of Labourd in that time). The Parlement of Bordeaux eventually dismissed him from office.

In his Portrait of the Inconstancy of Witches, de Lancre sums up his rationale as follows:

To dance indecently; eat excessively; make love diabolically; commit atrocious acts of sodomy; blaspheme scandalously; avenge themselves insidiously; run after all horrible, dirty, and crudely unnatural desires; keep toads, vipers, lizards, and all sorts of poison as precious things; love passionately a stinking goat; caress him lovingly; associate with and mate with him in a disgusting and scabrous fashion—are these not the uncontrolled characteristics of an unparalleled lightness of being and of an execrable inconstancy that can be expiated only through the divine fire that justice placed in Hell?

The Labourd witch-hunt influenced the Basque witch trials, which began the same year.

== Commemoration ==
A sculptor was erected in Saint-Pée-sur-Nivelle to commemorate the victims of the witch hunt.

== See also ==
- Jeanette Abadie
