= Andrés Ortiz-Osés =

Spanish philosopher (1943–2021)

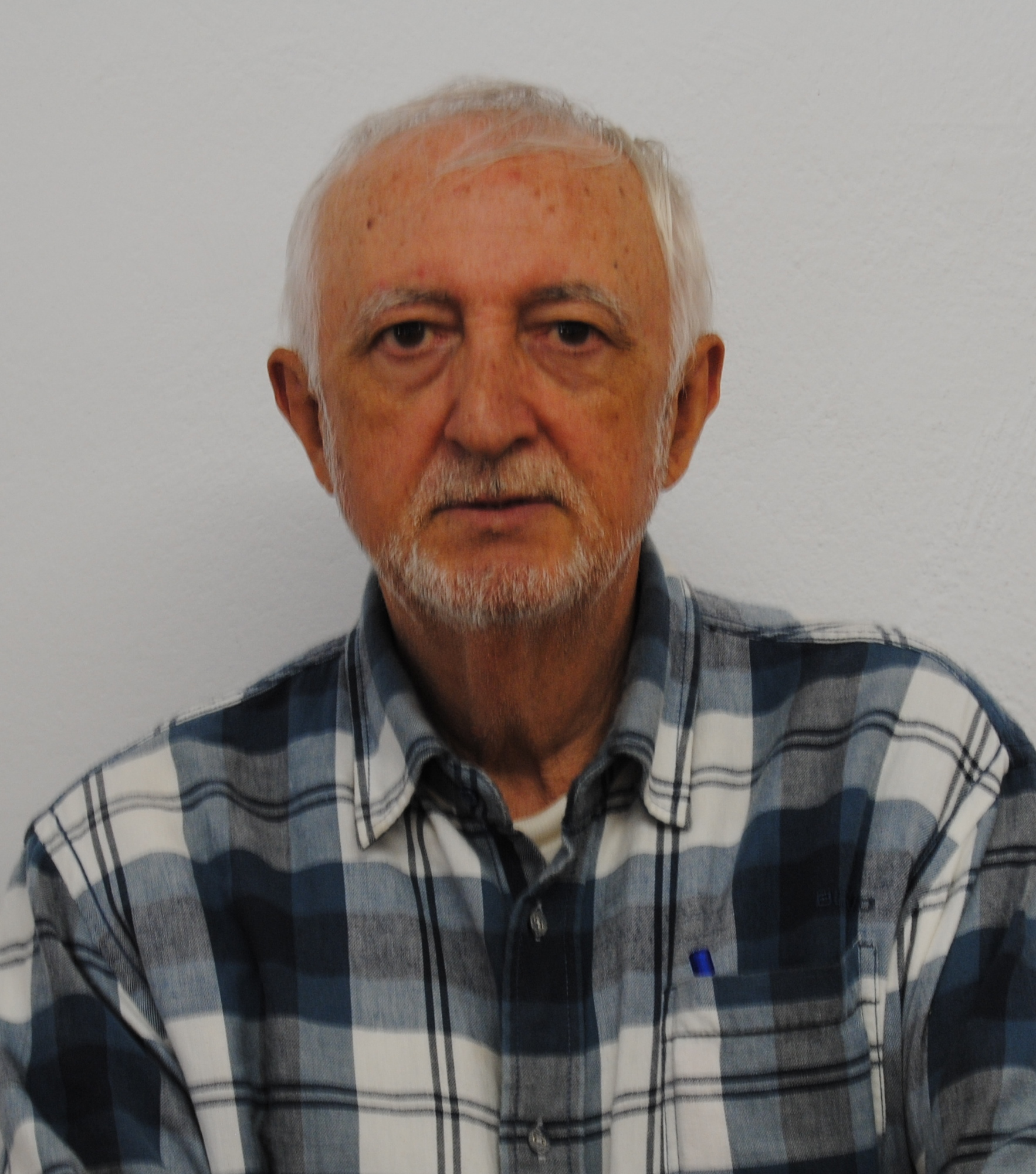
Andrés Ortiz-Osés.

Andrés Ortiz-Osés (1943 – 18 June 2021) was a Spanish philosopher. He was the founder of symbolic hermeneutics, a philosophical trend that gave a symbolic twist to north European hermeneutics.

He was born in Tardienta, studied theology in Comillas and Rome, and then moved to The Institute of Philosophy in Innsbruck where he earned a Ph.D. in hermeneutics.

At Innsbruck he attended the lessons of Gadamer and Coreth. He was a member of the Eranos group, inspired by C.G. Jung. Other members of Eranos have included Joseph Campbell, Karl Kerenyi, Mircea Eliade, Erich Neumann, Gilbert Durand, and James Hillman.

He was largely responsible for introducing Jungian theories into the Spanish and Latin American intellectual scene. He became a professor of hermeneutics at the University of Deusto in Bilbao. He wrote more than thirty books. He died in Zaragoza on 18 June 2021 at the age of 78.

== Related authors ==
- Gianni Vattimo
- Raimon Panikkar
- Paul Ricoeur
- Ernest Bornemann
- Jorge Oteiza

== Select bibliography ==
His whole body of work can be divided into four categories:

1. Hermeneutical treatises.

- Antropología Hermenéutica, Editorial Ricardo Aguilera, 1973.ISBN 84-7005-123-7
- Mundo, hombre y lenguaje crítico, Sígueme. 1976.
- Comunicación y experiencia interhumana, Descleé. 1977. ISBN 84-330-0383-6
- La nueva Filosofía hermenéutica, Anthropos, 1986. ISBN 84-7658-017-7

2. Symbolic and Mythological studies, especially interpretations of the Basque mythology.

- El matriarcalismo vasco, Universidad de Deusto, 1980. ISBN 84-7485-011-8
- El inconsciente colectivo vasco, Txertoa, 1982. ISBN 84-7148-107-3
- Antropología simbólica vasca, Anthropos, 1985. ISBN 84-85887-84-0
- La identidad cultural aragonesa, Centro de Estudios Bajoaragoneses, 1992.ISBN 84-86982-33-2
- La Diosa Madre, Trotta. 1996.ISBN 84-8164-099-9
- Las claves simbólicas de nuestra cultura, Anthropos, 1992. ISBN 84-7658-307-9
- Cuestiones fronterizas, Anthropos, 1999.ISBN 84-7658-560-8

3. Metaphysics of the sense of life.

- Metafísica del sentido, Universidad de Deusto, 1989. ISBN 84-7485-108-4
- Cuestiones fronterizas, Anthropos, 1999. ISBN 84-7658-560-8
- La razón afectiva, 2000. ISBN 84-8260-073-7
- Amor y Sentido, 2003. ISBN 84-7658-652-3

4. Aphorisms.

- Co-Razón, MRA, 1996. ISBN 84-88865-82-1
- Experiencia / Existencia, March Editor, 2006. ISBN 84-95608-77-4
- Filosofía de la experiencia, Instituto de Estudios Altoaragoneses, 2006. ISBN 84-8127-176-4
