= Toti Martínez de Lezea =

Spanish writer (born 1949)

- Esperanza Martínez de Lezea García
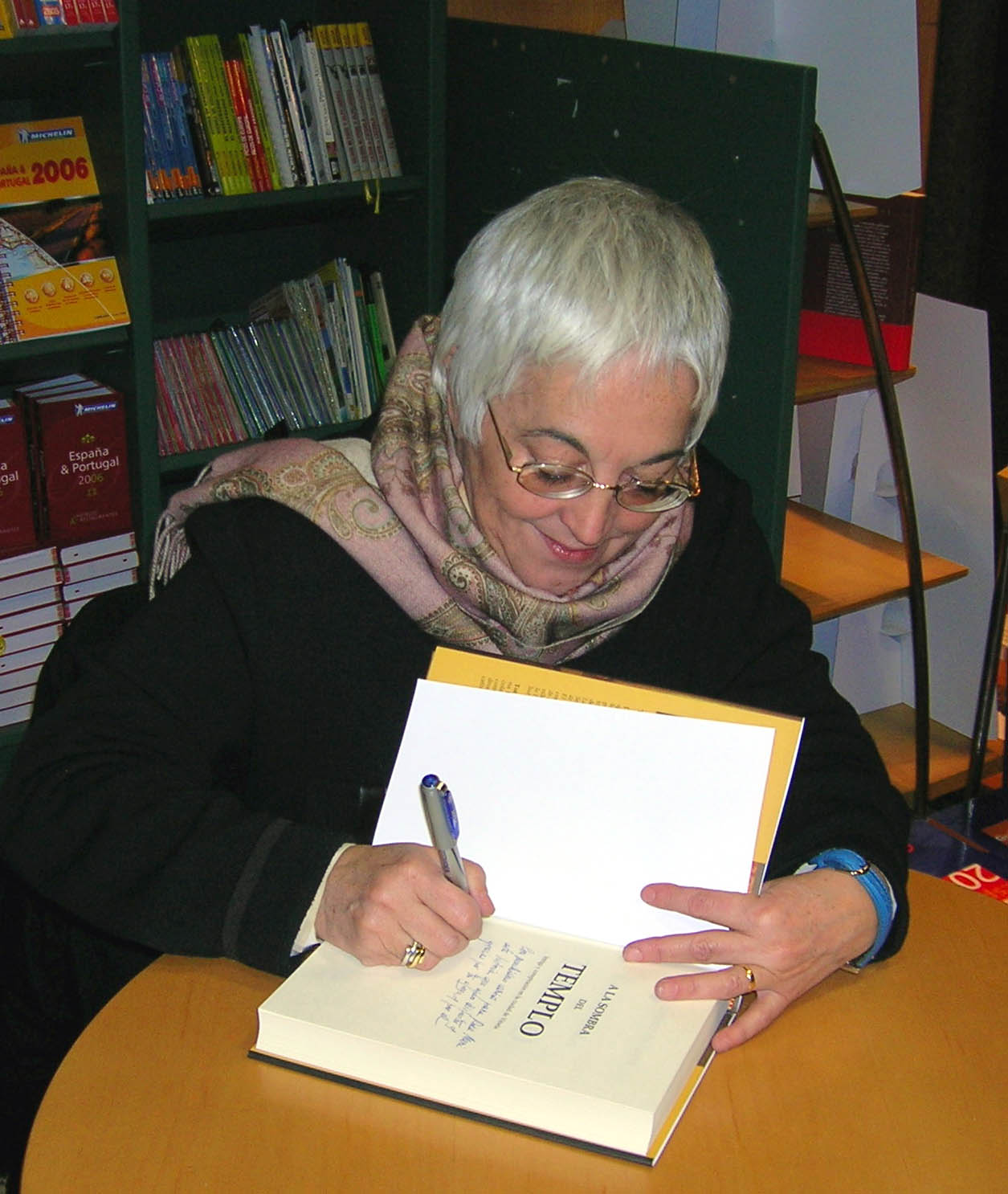
- Toti Martinez de Lezea in 2005
- Born: 1949 (age 76–77); Vitoria-Gasteiz, Álava, Spain
- Occupation: Writer
- Writing career
- Pen name: Toti Martínez de Lezea
- Language: Spanish, Basque, French, German, English
- Website: martinezdelezea.com

Esperanza Martínez de Lezea García (born in Vitoria-Gasteiz, Álava, Spain, 1949) is a Spanish writer who writes both in Spanish and Basque. She is a certified translator in French, English and German. She is also a television presenter and actor; she is one of the founders of the Kukubiltxo theatre company.

Her work reflects her great interest in the European Middle Ages and specially in the history and traditions of the Basque Country. She has also written children's literature. She has written scripts and also directed children's and young people's programmes for EITB.

== Biography ==
Esperanza "Toti" Martínez de Lezea García was born in 1949 in Vitoria-Gasteiz, the capital city of Álava in the Basque Country. She began her undergraduate degree and moved to the region of Goierri of Gipuzkoa, where she stayed for one year studying the Basque language. She studied French for four years in France, and then English for three years in England, obtaining the corresponding degree and the secretariat of the Pittman School of London. She lived for two years in Germany. She worked as a translator and an actress. Together with her husband and other young people of the locality of Larrabetzu from Biscay, where she resides, she founded the street theatre company Kukubiltxo, in which she participated for five years. Between 1983 and 1984 she collaborated with the Department of Education of the Basque Government creating more than 40 educational videos and writing two books about Basque legends and theatrical activities. She also taught courses to the academic personnel of the aforesaid department. In 1985 she began collaborating with the Basque public television, Euskal Telebista, with a 13-chapter-series about nature themes. Between 1986 and 1992 she wrote and directed 1200 programmes for EITB in Basque for children and young people. In 1992 returned to her translator and interpreter activities and began a new period of literary activity. She created large sport and animation mascots for different events. Juan Luis Landa become her regular illustrator. Until now, she has 57 books published, some of which have been translated into French, German, Russian and Chinese.

== Bibliography ==
=== Novels ===
- La calle de la Judería / Judu-kale (1998)
- Las torres de Sancho / Antsoren Dorreak (1999)
- La Herbolera / Kattalin / Die Heilerin (2000)
- Señor de la guerra (2001)
- Los hijos de Ogaiz / Ogaiztarrak / Les enfants d'Ogaiz (2002)
- La Abadesa / Maria Galanta, Abadesa / Die Äbtissin (2002)
- La voz de Lug (2003)
- La comunera / Die Löwin von Kastilien (2003)
- El verdugo de Dios / Die Madonna von Santiago (2004)
- La cadena rota / Hautsi da katea / La chaîne brisée (2005)
- A la sombra del templo (2005)
- La Brecha / Bretxa (2006)
- El jardín de la oca / Das Geheimnis von Santiago (2007)
- La flor de la argoma / Otalorea (2008)
- Perlas para un collar (2009)
- La Universal (2010)
- Veneno para la corona / Pozoia koroari (2011)
- Mareas / Urak dakarrena (2012)
- Itahisa (2013)
- ENDA / Enda Lur (2014)
- Y todos callaron / Isilpean Gordea (2015)
- Tierra de leche y miel / Esne eta eztizko Lurra (2016)
- ITTUN / Arbasoak ittuna (2017)
- Llanto en la tierra baldía / Malkoak lur antzuan (2018)
- Hierba de brujas / Sorgin belarra (2019)
- La Editorial / Egurra S.A. (2020)

=== Books for children ===
==== Nur series ====
- Nur y el gnomo irlandés / Nur eta irlandar gnomoa / Nur i el gnom irlandès / Nur and the leprechaun (2008)
- Nur y la selva misteriosa / Nur eta oihan misteriotsua (2008)
- Nur y el templo del dragón / Nur eta herensugearen tenplua (2009)
- Nur y la casa embrujada / Nur eta etxe sorgindua (2009)
- Nur y el campamento de magia / Nur eta magia-kanpamendua (2010)
- Nur y la alfombra voladora / Nur eta alfonbra hegalaria (2011)
- Nur y la rosa de los vientos / Nur eta haize-arrosa (2012)
- Nur y la isla de las tortugas / Nur eta dortoken uhartea (2013)
- Nur y el libro del tiempo / Nur eta denboraren liburua (2014)
- Nur y la cueva encantada / Nur eta kobazulo liluragarria (2015)
- Nur y el cofre del tesoro / Nur eta altxorraren kutxa (2016)
- Nur y el baile de los vampiros / Nur eta banpiroen dantza ("2017)
- Nur y el viaje a Irlanda / Nur eta Irlandara bidaia (2018)
- Nur y el pájaro arco iris / Nur eta ortzadar-txoria (2019)
- Nur y Olentzero / Nur eta Olentzeroa (2020)
- Nur y el circo prodigioso / Nur eta zirku miresgarria (2021)

==== Stories ====
- Un reloj de cu-cu / Kuku erloju bat (2013)
- Un dragón azul / Dragoi urdin bat (2013)
- Una bola de cristal muy especial / Kristalezko bola berezi-berezi bat (2013)
- Un regalo de cumpleaños / Urtemuga-opari bat (2013)
- Una pelota saltarina / Saltoka ibiltzen den pilota bat (2013)
- Un lápiz llamado Pencil / Pencil izeneko arkatz bat (2013)
- Un enanito muy pequeño / Ipotx txiki-txiki bat (2013)
- El cantero y la lamiñaku / Hargina eta laminakua (2013)

=== Young literature ===
- Muerte en el priorato / Heriotza harrigarria (2008)
- El mensajero del rey / Erregearen mezularia (2012)
- La hija de la luna / Ilargiaren alaba (2013)

=== Others ===
- Leyendas de Euskal Herria / Euskal Herriko leiendak (2004)
- Brujas / Sorginak (2006)
- Placeres reales (2008)
- Los grafitis de mamá (2009)

== Sources ==
- Author's biography; Martínez de Lezea, Toti (2010). La Calle de la Judería (11 ed.). EmBOLSILLO. ISBN 978-84-15140-10-8.
- Ibargutxi, Felix. "El ratón que se convirtió en gnomo". Diario Vasco.
- "Nur series". Nur euskaraz, Erein.
- "Books by Toti Martínez de Lezea". Goodreads - Books by Toti Martínez de Lezea.
