= María de Zozaya =

Alleged witch

María de Zozaya y Arramendi
- Born: c. 1529; Oyeregui, Navarra, Spain
- Died: c. 1609
- Occupation: Spinster
- Criminal charges: Witchcraft

María de Zozaya y Arramendi (sometimes spelled Zozoya) was prosecuted for being a witch in 1609, during the Basque witch trials that were part of the Spanish Inquisition.

María de Zozaya was a spinster from Oyeregui, in the kingdom of Navarra, Spain. She was a resident of the town Renteria, in the province of Guipuzcoa, and purportedly witch of the same town’s aquelarre. In 1609, the 79-year-old María de Zozaya was handed over to the Spanish Inquisition for being a witch. She was tried along with a group of women that she was said to have led. Her confession included praise for sexual pleasure. She also declared that an apparition replaced her in her bed when she went to the Sabbath. It is said that a young priest in the same town went out hunting all day without catching any hares. He blamed María de Zozaya, who reportedly confessed to the inquisitors that after the priest had passed her house she turned herself into a hare and ran ahead of him and his hounds the whole day long, thus making them exhausted. She said this happened eight times during 1609. She died in prison nine months after she was turned in, when she was 80 years old. After her death, her bones were burned as part of a public auto de fe.
