= Mari (goddess) =

Main goddess of pre-Christian Basque mythology

- Mother goddess
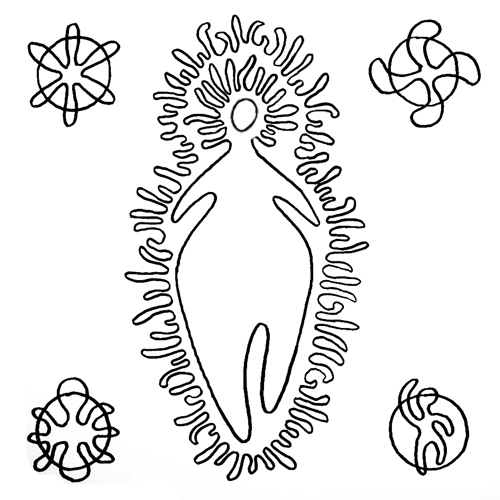
- Modern rendering of Mari by Josu Goñi
- Abode: Cuava de la Dama on Mount Anboto
- Animals: Ram
- Consort: Sugaar

Equivalents
- Christian: Virgin Mary

Mari, the main goddess of the ancient Basque mythology. Other epithets for her include Señora de Anboto, Yona-gorri de Leskun, and Bruja de Aketegi, among others.

The first known written citation of the "Lady of Anboto" was made by Charles V's chronicler Esteban de Garibay in his Memorial histórico español.

== Mythology and description ==
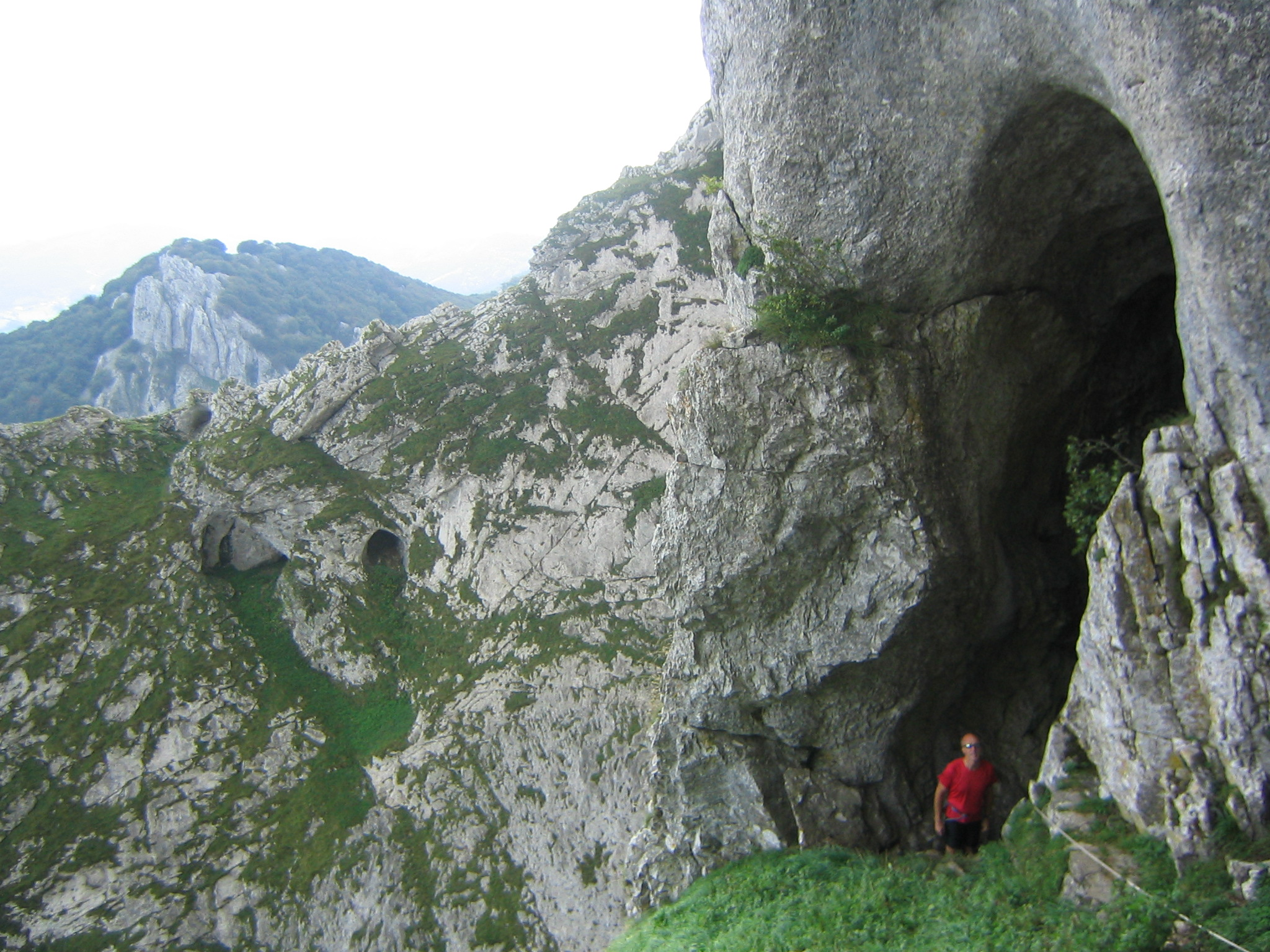
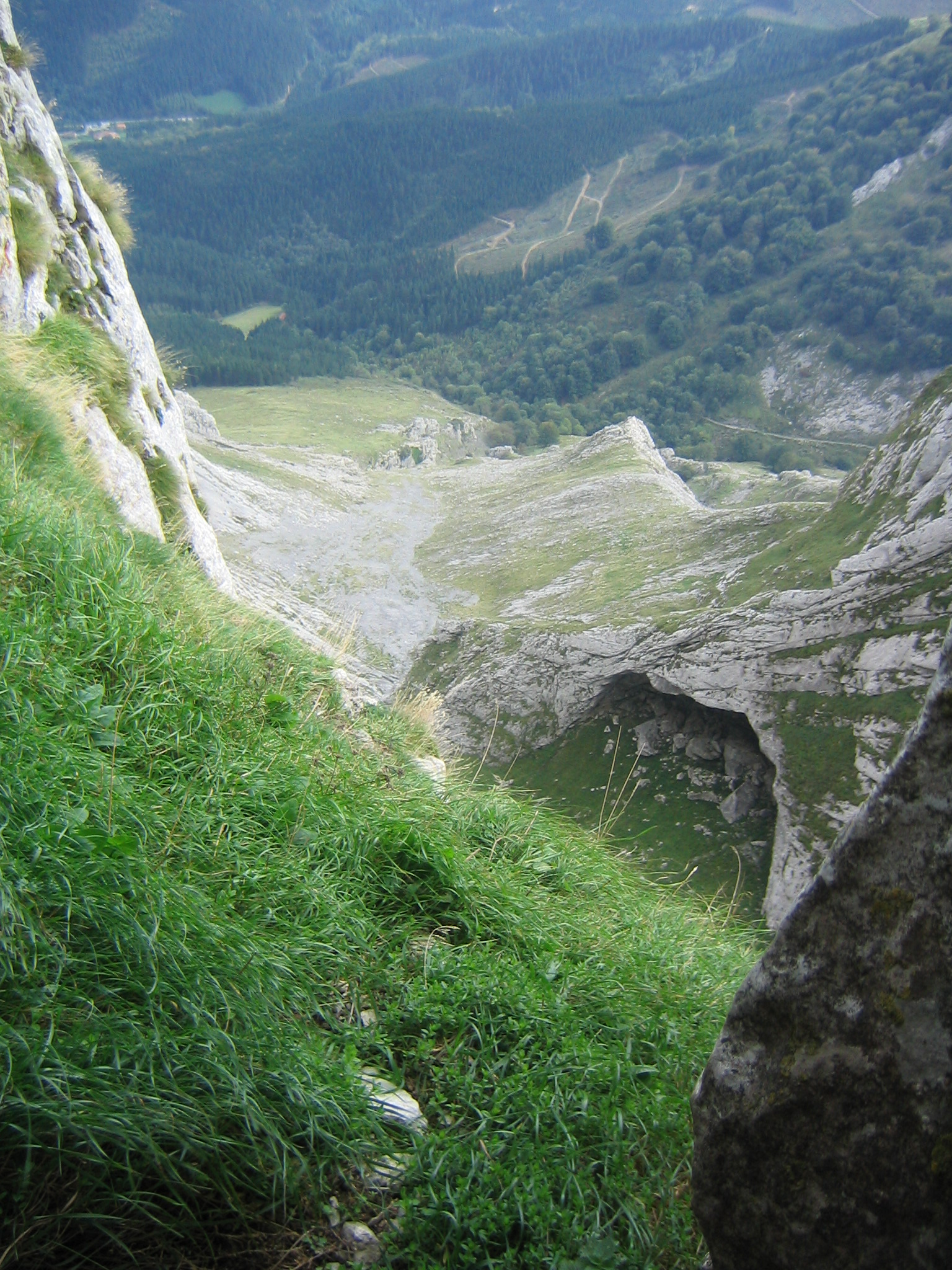
Left: Entrance to the Cuava de la Dama
Right: View from the cave overlooking Mount Anboto

Descriptions of Mari are varied. She is usually said to appear as a beautiful woman with long hair, sometimes engulfed in flame when she flies through the sky. In Kakueta (Soule), she looks like a vulture. She is sometimes displayed next to a ram.

She is said to live in a cave on the eastern slope of Mount Anboto, known as the Cuava de la Dama (Cave of the Lady). She is married to the god Sugaar (also known as Sugoi or Maju).

Mari is considered to be an Earth mother figure and is also associated with the weather, which is said to be affected by her activities and emotions. For example, violent storms are caused when Sugaar visits her, clouds of smoke when she cooks, and hail when she is angry. Her arrival is announced by a peal of thunder or by clouds gathering around Mount Anboto. Offerings may be made to Mari to induce good weather.

She is also said to take goods whose owners have denied their existence out of selfishness. If a person enters her cave, they should not turn their back on her and exit the cave walking backwards.

== Etymology ==
It is believed that Mari is a modification of "Emari" (gift) or, "Amari" (mother + the suffix of profession) by losing the first vowel. The closeness in names between Mari and Mary may have helped pagans adapt their worship of Mari and undertake Christian veneration of the Virgin Mary, (Basque: Andre Maria, Biscayan: Andra Mari).

== Christianization ==
The most accepted syncretism of Mari is with the Virgin Mary; she is widely venerated by modern Catholic Basques. However, Santa Marina of Aguas Santas, a saint revered in the Basque Country, is considered a christianised version of Mari. Basque women invoke Santa Marina for protection against curses and aid in childbirth.

== See also ==
- Mariamman
- Sugaar
- Sorginak
- Basajaun
- Lamia (Basque mythology)
- Aatxe
