= Sugaar =

Pre-Christian Basque deity

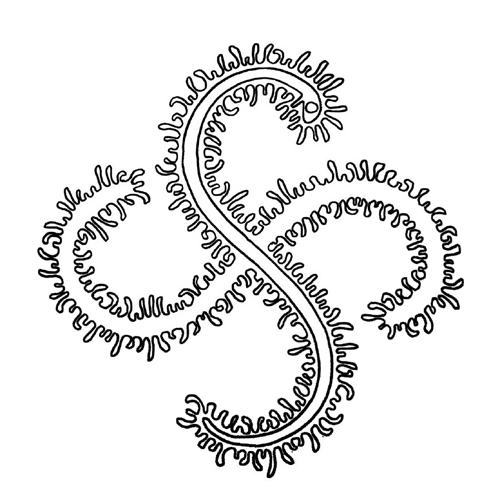
Modern rendering of Sugaar as serpent in the lauburu by Josu Goñi

In Basque mythology, Sugaar (also Sugar, Sugoi, Suarra, Maju) is the male half of a pre-Christian Basque deity associated with storms and thunder. He shows may similarities to Herensuge, with Sugaar being much older.

== Mythology and description ==
Sugaar is sometimes said to take the form of pure fire or lightning, but his true form is usually represented as a serpent or dragon. He is Mari's consort, and is said to visit her at Anboto every Friday. Different interpretations say that these meetings consist of him doing her hair or that the pair join to create thunderstorms. The visits are also considered sexual in nature, a reference to how the rain (Sugaar) fertilizes the earth and soil (Mari). Like Mari, Sugar is said to live in various caves and mountains. One of his homes is said to be the Aralar Mountain Range.

In Betelu, Sugaar is said to be an evil spirit, and in Ataun, he is used as a bogyman figure.

=== The young men from Dima ===
One legend about Sugaar involves two young brothers from Dima, Spain. The pair found Sugaar in a cave in Baltzola, and the younger of the two cut his tail with a stone. The elder brother disproved of the younger's actions, and they left.

Years later, the elder brother meets a man who takes him to the same Baltzola cave. The man gives him a box of gold to keep, as well as a red belt to give to his younger brother. When the brothers met again, the younger brother refused to put the belt on and tied it to a chestnut tree. The tree burst into flames, and they realized that the man must have been Sugaar.

== Etymology ==
The name Suga(a)r is derived from suge (serpent) and -ar (male), thus "male serpent". The suggestions of a formation based on su (fire) and gar (flame), thus yielding "flame of fire" are considered folk etymology.

Sugoi, another name of the same deity, has two possible interpretations, either a suge + o[h]i (former, "old serpent") or su + goi ("high fire"). There is no likely etymology for the third name of this god, Maju.

== See also ==
- Herensuge (Basque dragon)
