= Mairu =

Race of giants in Basque mythology

Mairu (plural: mairuak), also called Maideak, Mairiak, Saindi Maidi (in Lower Navarre), Intxisu in the Bidasoa valley are creatures of Basque mythology.

== Mythlogy ==
The Mairu were giants who built dolmens or harrespil. Like the dolmens, they are only found in mountains. They are often associated with lamia, though these are known in all the Basque Country.

== Origin ==
Mairu could mean "moor" in Basque. This term is used with the sense of 'non-Christian' to refer to former civilizations or megalithic monuments.

The origin of the Mairu is thought to be as old as the "mouros encantados" in Portuguese (Spanish: moros encantados), who are thought to be the remnant of old pre-Roman deities.

== See also ==
- Basque mythology
