= Wentworth Webster =

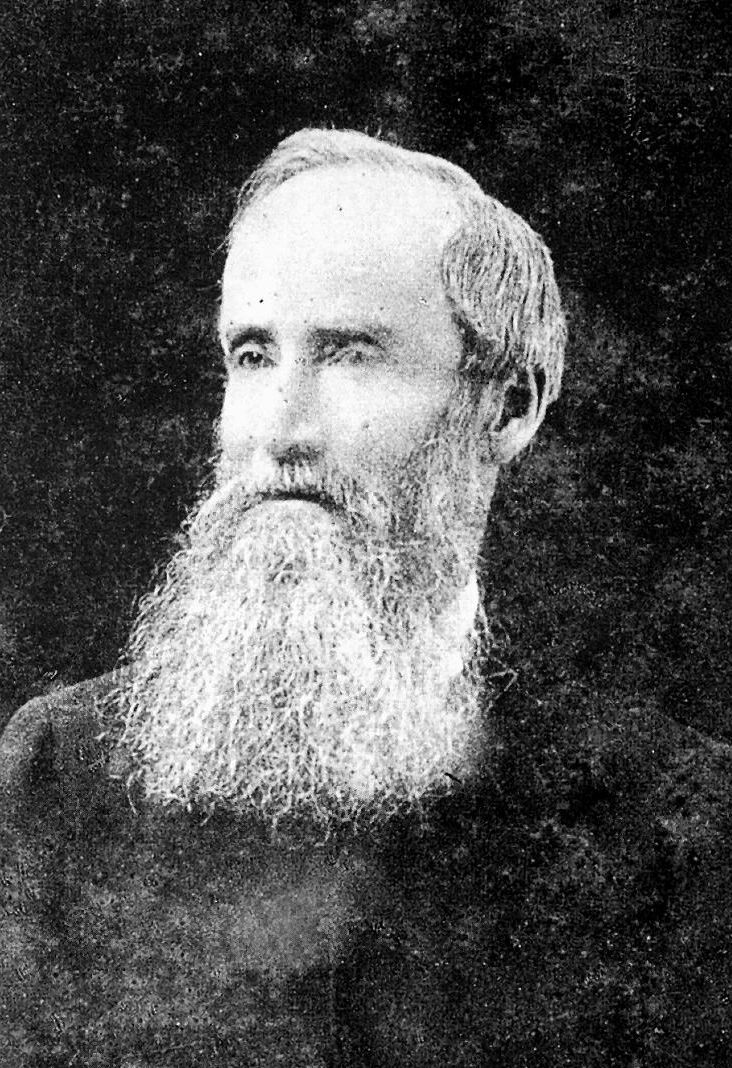
- Wentworth Webster ca. 1900.
- Born: 16 June 1828; Uxbridge, Middlesex, England
- Died: 2 April 1907 (aged 78); Sare, Pyrénées-Atlantiques, France

Wentworth Webster (16 June 1828 – 2 April 1907) was an Anglican clergyman, scholar, and collector of folk tales of the Basque Country.

== Biography ==
After studying in a private school in Brighton, he entered Lincoln College, Oxford at the age of 21 and graduated in 1852. In 1854, he started as a deacon in the parish of Cloford, Somerset. Though his fragile health delayed his ordination, he became a priest in 1861. He was then allowed to exercise his ministry to the English residents in France.

He had previously traveled to Scotland, Germany, Switzerland, the Azores, Rio de Janeiro, and Buenos Aires. From 1862 to 1863, he traveled to Egypt before settling in southwest France. He was a tutor in the commune of Bagneres-de-Bigorre where he met his future wife. Eventually, he served as the first chaplain of the new anglican church established in Saint-Jean-de-Luz from 1869–1882. During those years, he had four girls and a boy who all spoke fluent Basque. During his stay, he collected traditional Basque tales from the local people. With the help of Basque scholar Julien Vinson, he published these stories in the first edition of his Basque Legends in 1877.

Webster regularly published books including a book on Spain entitled Spain. In 1882, he resigned from his position at the parish of Saint-Jean-de-Luz and settled in Sare in the heart of Labourd. He continued to write religious and erudite articles on the Basque Country for both British magazines and regional ones. He often traveled to the neighboring countries where he met many of his friends, including Antoine d'Abbadie. He also received many visitors including William Ewart Gladstone, the British Prime Minister at the time. In 1901, he wrote Les Loisirs d'un étranger en Pays basque.

In March 1907, King Edward VII went to Sare to attend a game of Basque pelota played in his honor. However, Webster, too weakened by illness, was not able to greet the king. Wentworth Webster died on 2 April 1907 while drafting an article on the Basque Country for the Encyclopædia Britannica.

== Works ==
- Basque Legends, London, Griffith and Farran, 1877.
- Spain, Foreign Countries and British Colonies collection, Simpson Low, London, 1882.
- Grammaire cantabrique basque par Pierre d'Urte (1712), published by Wentworth Webster, Bagnères-de-Bigorre, 1900.
- Les Loisirs d'un étranger au Pays basque, Châlons-sur-Saöne, Imprimerie française et orientale E. Bertrand, 1901.

== Sources ==
- Philippe Veyrin, Wentworth Webster, Bulletin du Musée Basque n°10, 1929/1.2, pages 1 à 15
- Philippe Veyrin, L'œuvre basque de Wentworth Webster, esquisse d'une bibliographie, Bulletin du Musée Basque n°10, 1929/1.2, pages 16 à 21. https://www.bilketa.eus/ark:/27020/bi00013/1929/10/v0032.simple.selectedTab=record [archive]
- "Wentworth Webster (1828-1907)", by Philippe Veyrin, in Wentworth Webster, Légendes Basques, Anglet, Éditions Aubéron, 2005
