= Jose Miguel Barandiaran =

Basque anthropologist, ethnographer, and priest

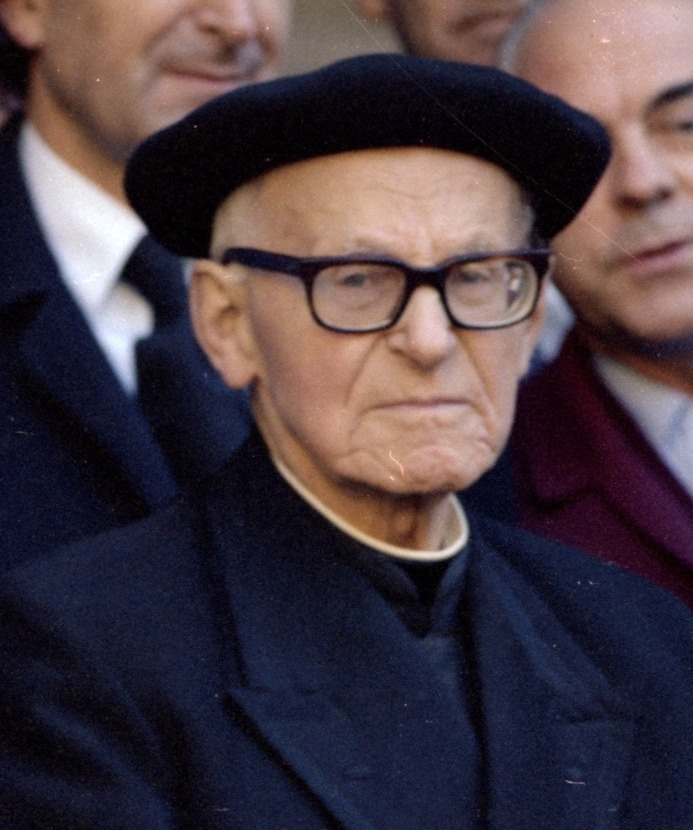
- Born: 31 December 1889; Ataun, Basque Country, Spain
- Died: 21 December 1991 (aged 101); Ataun, Basque Country, Spain
- Other names: On Joxemiel; Aita Barandiaran
- Occupations: Anthropologist, ethnographer, priest

Jose Miguel Barandiaran Aierbe (Spanish: José Miguel de Barandiarán y Ayerbe; 31 December 1889 – 21 December 1991), known as On Joxemiel Barandiaran and Aita Barandiaran ("Father Barandiaran"), was a Basque anthropologist, ethnographer, and priest.

== Early life ==
He was born in 1889 as the youngest of nine children to Francisco Antonio Barandiaran and María Antonia Ayerbe in the family baserri Perune-Zarre in Ataun. Encouraged by his mother, he entered the priesthood aged 14 in Baliarrain and was ordained as a priest in 1914 in Burgos. Ordained a priest in 1914, the following year he obtained a degree in Theology. In 1916, he joined the Faculty of Philosophy of the Vitoria Seminary as a science professor, teaching the subjects of Physics and Chemistry, Geology, Human Paleontology, Prehistory and History of Religions. He lasted for twenty years as a professor, simultaneously exercising managerial positions such as that of vice-rector.

== Career as an ethnographer ==
Soon after being ordained as a priest, he took up ethnographic studies of Basque culture and archeology around 1916 in the Aralar Mountains. He carried out invaluable research into folk traditions and collecting accounts and tales related to Basque mythology. His contribution to the paleontological study of the Basque people. Magismo, which presented in Bilbao in 1919, strongly interested the great ethnologist Wilhelm Schmidt, founder of the magazine Anthropos in Vienna. This offered him the position of correspondent for Spain and invited him to participate in the International Week of Religious Ethnology that was going to be celebrated in the Dutch town of Tilburg in 1922. There he delivered his communication French: La religion des anciens basques, lit. 'The Religion of ancient Basques'. When the Spanish Civil War began, he had to go into exile in September 1936, considered a suspect simply because of his dedication to Basque culture. In 1953, he returned from exile and opened at the University of Salamanca, at the request of its rector, Don Antonio Tovar, the Larramendi Chair with a course on the current state of Basque studies. The following year, within the Aranzadi Science Society, he created the Ethnology Seminar and, after twenty years of interruption, in 1955, published volume XV of the Eusko Folklore Yearbook, with studies on pastoral and agricultural life followed by others dedicated to popular industries and crafts.

== Awards ==
In 1989, he received the Gold Medal for Merit in Fine Arts from the Ministry of Education, Culture and Sports Ministry of Education, Spanish Culture and Sports.

== Bibliography ==
Its complete collection consists of 211 numbers and is an important corpus of data reflecting the mental universe of traditional Basque populations during the past 20th century. With these data collected, he published his works and articles on Basque mythology.

- Basque paleontography (1921)
- Basque mythology (1924)
- Primitive man in the Basque Country (1934)
- Anthropology of the Basque population (1947)
- Basque culture (1977)
- General history of the Basque Country (1980)
- Witchcraft and witches (1984)
- Myths of the Basque people (1989)
- Mythology of the Basque people (1994)

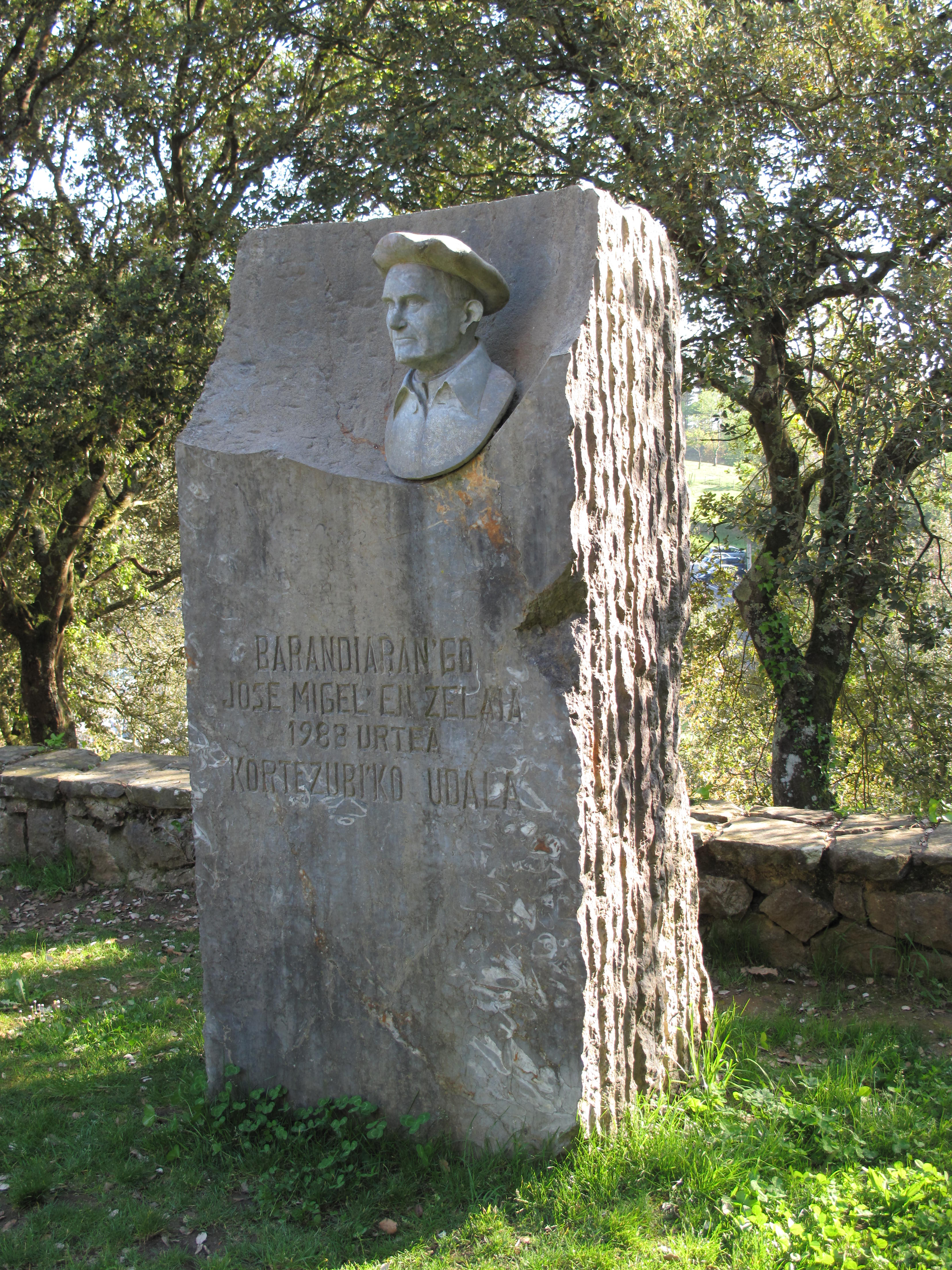
The Barandiaran memorial at the Santimamiñe cave.
