= Ataun =

- Municipality
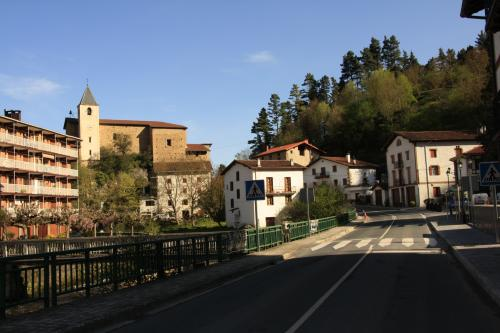
- Ataun Town

- Coat of arms
- Nicknames: Aralarko Atea, "El Paso" Gipuzkoarra
- Location of Ataun within the Basque Country Location of Ataun within Spain
- Coordinates: 42°58′41″N 2°10′53″W
- Country: Spain
- Autonomous community: Basque Country
- Province: Gipuzkoa
- Eskualdea: Goierri
- Established: 1615

Government
  - Mayor: Martin Aramendi (EH Bildu)

Area
  - Total: 58.73 km^{2} (22.68 sq mi)

Population (2025-01-01)
  - Total: 1,714
  - Density: 29.18/km^{2} (75.59/sq mi)
- Demonym: Ataundar
- Official language(s): Basque, Spanish

Ataun is a town located at the foot of the Aralar Range in the Goierri region of the province of Gipuzkoa, in the autonomous community of the Basque Country, in the north of Spain. The town consists of three major parishes - San Martin, San Gregorio and Aia - along with several other minor boroughs.

== Notable of Ataun ==
- Jose Migel Barandiaran, anthropologist, ethnographer and priest
