= Basque mythology =

Mythology of the ancient Basques

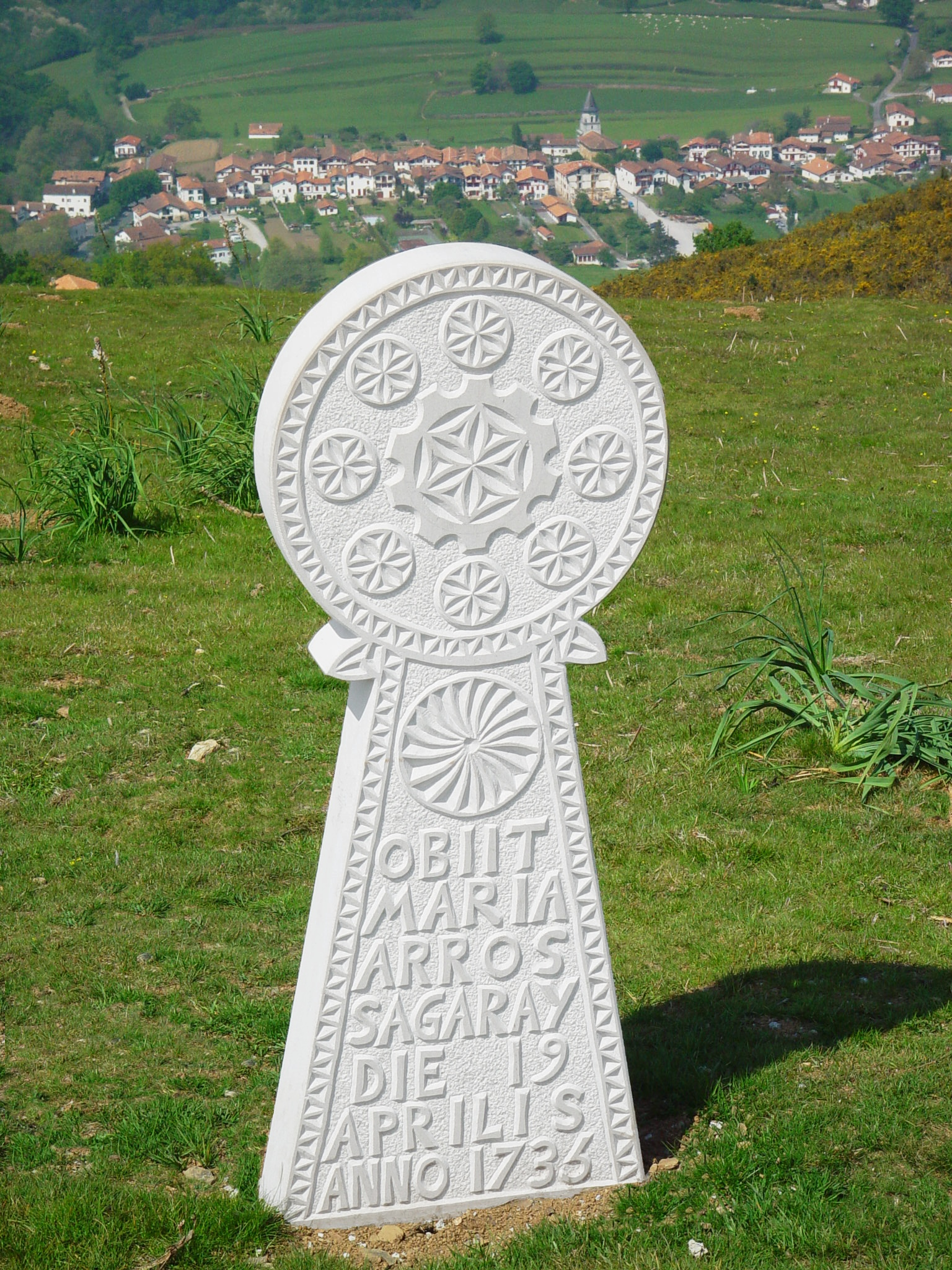
A reproduction of a Hilarri, a Basque gravestone, from 1736 with commonly found symbols. Translated from Latin, it reads, "Maria Arrossagaray died on the 19th day of April, 1736".

The mythology of the ancient Basques largely did not survive the arrival of Christianity in the Basque Country between the 4th and 12th century AD. Most of what is known about elements of this original belief system is based on the analysis of legends, the study of place names and scant historical references to pagan rituals practised by the Basques.

One main figure of this belief system was the female deity Mari. According to legends collected in the area of Ataun, the other main figure was her consort Sugaar. However, due to the scarcity of the material, it is difficult to say if this would have been the "central pair" of the Basque pantheon. Based on the attributes ascribed to these mythological creatures, this would be considered a chthonic religion as all its characters dwell on earth or below it, with the sky seen mostly as an empty corridor through which the divinities pass.

== Historical sources ==
The main sources for information about non-Christian Basque beliefs are:

- Strabo, who mentions the sacrifice of male goats and humans
- Arab writers from the time of the Umayyad conquest of Hispania (8th century)
- the 12th century diary of the pilgrim Aymeric Picaud
- various medieval sources making references to pagan rituals, including the records of the Inquisition
- 19th and 20th century collections of myths and folk-tales, such as those collected by José Miguel Barandiaran, which comprise by far the largest body of material relating to non-Christian beliefs and practices
- the modern study of place-names in the Basque Country

== The Urtzi controversy ==
Urtzi may have been a Basque mythological figure—a sky god—but may have been merely a word for the sky. There is evidence that can be read as either supporting or contradicting the existence of such a deity. To date, neither theory has been entirely accepted.

== Influence on Iberian pantheons ==
The Iberian Peninsula's Indo-European speaking cultures like the Lusitanians and Celtiberians seem to display a significant Basque influence on their mythologies. This includes the concept of the Enchanted Mouras, which may be based on the Mairu, and the god Endovelicus, whose name may come from proto-Basque words.

== Myths of the historical period ==
After Christianization, the Basques kept producing and importing myths.

- Jaun Zuria is the mythical first Lord of Biscay, said to be born of a Scottish princess who had an encounter with the god Sugaar in the village of Mundaka.
- The battle of Roncesvalles was mythologized in the cycle of the Matter of France.
- In the Aralar Range, Saint Michael was said to appear to assist a local noble turned hermit.
- The coat of arms of Navarre was said to come from a feat in the battle of Las Navas de Tolosa.
- The battle of Amaiur was the battle where Navarre lost its independence to the Crown of Castile.

== See also ==
- Basajaun
- Legend of la Encantada

== Bibliography ==
- Arriaga, J. (1984). "Euskal mitologia" [Basque mythology]. Gero (in Basque).
- Barandiaran, Jose Migel (1996). Mitología Vasca [Basque mythology] (in Spanish). Txertoa.
- Baroja, Caro (1995). "Lamiak, sorginak eta jainkosak" [Lamias, witches and goddesses]. Gaiak (in Basque) (Euskal mitologia).
- CAMARENA, JULIO; Maxime CHEVALIER. Catálogo tipológico del cuento folklórico español (in five volumes). Madrid: Gredos y Centro de Estudios Cervantinos; I, cuentos maravillosos, 1995; II, cuentos de animales, 1997; III, cuentos religiosos, 2003; IV, cuentos-novela, 2003). (compiles tales from Spain, with references to Basque collections in some volumes).
- Everson, M. (1989). "Tenacity in religion, myth, and folklore: the Neolithic Goddess of Old Europe preserved in a non-Indo-European setting". Journal of Indo-European Studies. 17 (277).
- Hartsuaga, J.I. (1987). Euskal Mitologia Konparatua [Comparative Basque Mythology] (in Basque). Kriseilu.
- La Paglia, Antonio. Beyond Greece and Rome: Faith and Worship in Ancient Europe, Black Mountain Press, 2004.
- Lezea, Toti Martínez de. "Leyendas de Euskal Herria". Erein, 2004.
- Ortíz-Osés, A. El matriarcalismo vasco. Universidad de Deusto, 1980. ISBN 84-7485-011-8.
- ______ . El inconsciente colectivo vasco. Txertoa, 1982. ISBN 84-7148-107-3.
- ______ . Antropología simbólica vasca. Anthropos, 1985. ISBN 84-85887-84-0
- Satrústegi, J. (1996). "Haitzuloetako euskal mitologia" [Basque cave mythology]. Euskal Mitologia (in Basque). 68: 165–174.

Folktale collections

- Videgain, Xarles. "Quelques contes basques tirés du manuscrit Webster". In: Fontes linguae vasconum: Studia et documenta, Año nº 6, Nº 18, 1974. pp. 453–464. ISSN 0046-435X.
- Vinson, Julien. Le Folk-lore du Pays Basque. Paris: Maisonneuve, 1883.
- Webster, Wentworth. Basque legends. London: Griffith and Farran. 1879.
- Zaïka, Natalia M. Approche textologique et comparative du conte traditionnel basque dans les versions bilingues de 1873 à 1942 (W. Webster, J.-F. Cerquand, J. Barbier, R. M. de Azkue). Iker-31. Euskaltzindia, 2014.
- Catálogo tipológico de los cuentos populares maravillosos vascos. Herri kulturaren narrazioak, 2007.
