= 1610 =

1610 in various calendars
- Gregorian calendar: 1610; MDCX
- Ab urbe condita: 2363
- Armenian calendar: 1059; ԹՎ ՌԾԹ
- Assyrian calendar: 6360
- Balinese saka calendar: 1531–1532
- Bengali calendar: 1016–1017
- Berber calendar: 2560
- English Regnal year: 7 Ja. 1 – 8 Ja. 1
- Buddhist calendar: 2154
- Burmese calendar: 972
- Byzantine calendar: 7118–7119
- Chinese calendar: 己酉年 (Earth Rooster); 4307 or 4100 — to — 庚戌年 (Metal Dog); 4308 or 4101
- Coptic calendar: 1326–1327
- Discordian calendar: 2776
- Ethiopian calendar: 1602–1603
- Hebrew calendar: 5370–5371
- Hindu calendars
- Vikram Samvat: 1666–1667
- Shaka Samvat: 1531–1532
- Kali Yuga: 4710–4711
- Holocene calendar: 11610
- Igbo calendar: 610–611
- Iranian calendar: 988–989
- Islamic calendar: 1018–1019
- Japanese calendar: Keichō 15 (慶長１５年)
- Javanese calendar: 1530–1531
- Julian calendar: Gregorian minus 10 days
- Korean calendar: 3943
- Minguo calendar: 302 before ROC 民前302年
- Nanakshahi calendar: 142
- Thai solar calendar: 2152–2153
- Tibetan calendar: ས་མོ་བྱ་ལོ་ (female Earth-Bird); 1736 or 1355 or 583 — to — ལྕགས་ཕོ་ཁྱི་ལོ་ (male Iron-Dog); 1737 or 1356 or 584

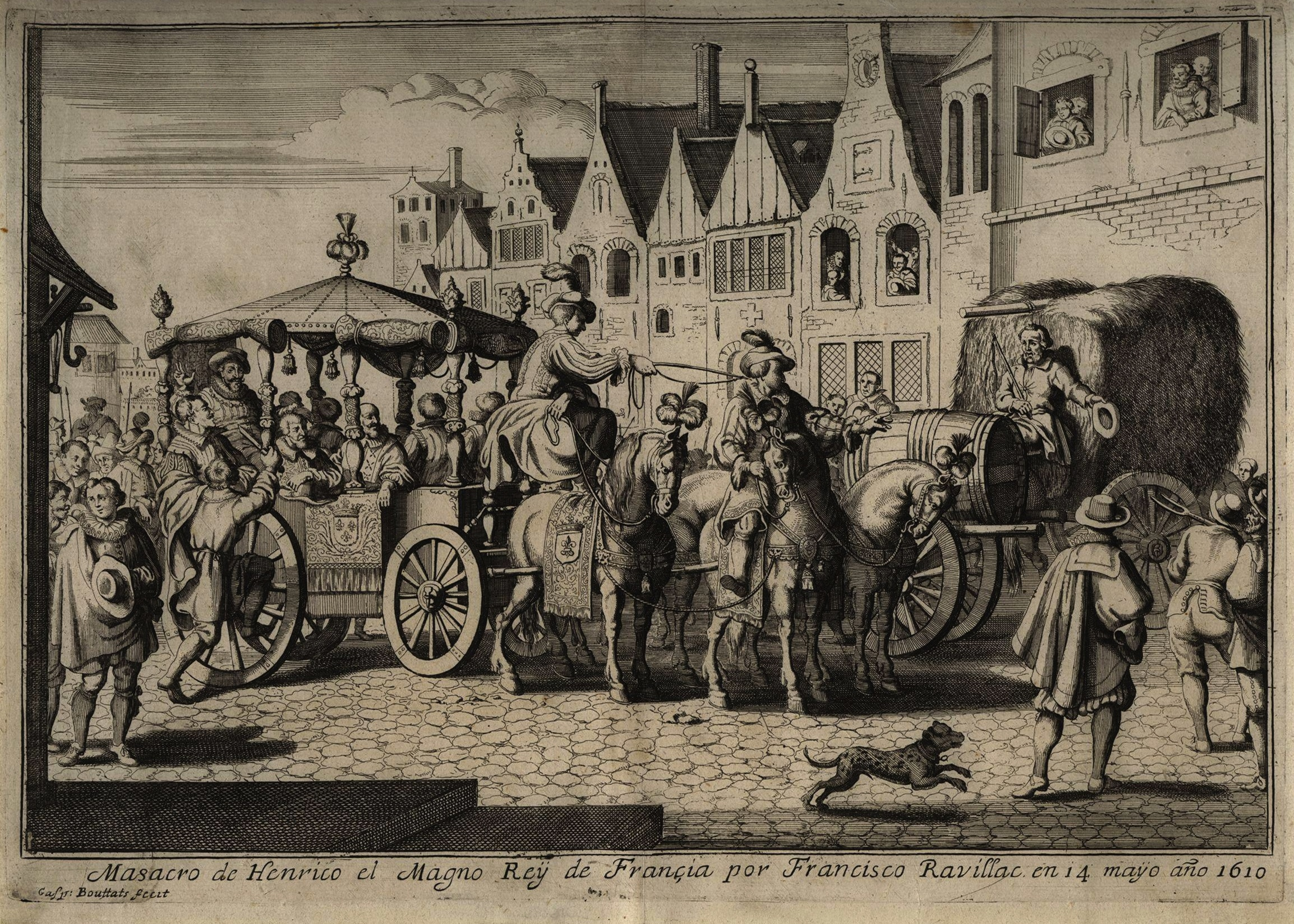
May 14: Henry IV of France is assassinated by François Ravaillac.

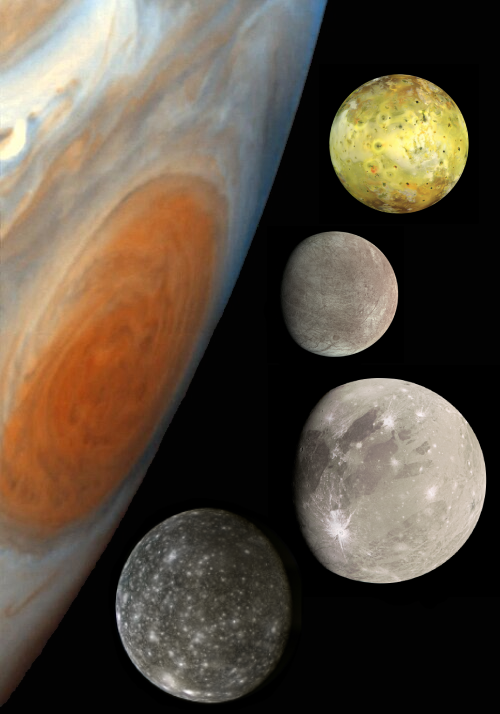
January 7: The four Galilean moons are first observed.

1610 (MDCX) was a common year starting on Friday of the Gregorian calendar and a common year starting on Monday of the Julian calendar, the 1610th year of the Common Era (CE) and Anno Domini (AD) designations, the 610th year of the 2nd millennium, the 10th year of the 17th century, and the 1st year of the 1610s decade. As of the start of 1610, the Gregorian calendar was 10 days ahead of the Julian calendar, which remained in localized use until 1923.

Some have suggested that 1610 may mark the beginning of the Anthropocene, or the 'Age of Man', marking a fundamental change in the relationship between humans and the Earth system, but earlier starting dates (ca. 1000 C.E.) have received broader consensus, based on high resolution pollution records that show the massive impact of human activity on the atmosphere.

== Events ==
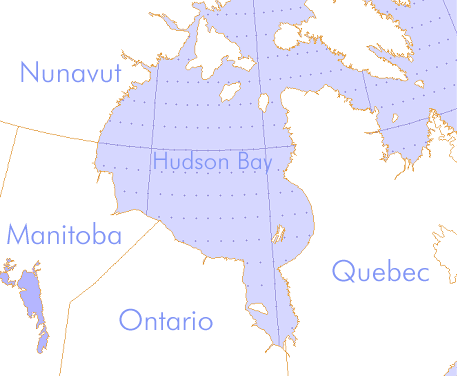
August 2: Henry Hudson sails into Hudson Bay.

=== January–March ===
- January 6 – Nossa Senhora da Graça incident: A Portuguese carrack sinks near Nagasaki, after fighting Japanese samurai for four nights.
- January 7 – Galileo Galilei first observes the four Galilean moons of Jupiter: Ganymede, Callisto, Europa and Io, but is unable to distinguish the latter two until the following day.
- February 24 – English courtier Thomas Roe sets out on an expedition to The Guianas and Amazon River.
- March 13 – Galileo Galilei's treatise on astronomy, Sidereus Nuncius, the first printed scientific record of observations through a telescope, is first published.
- March 22 (March 12 O.S.) – Mikhail Skopin-Shuisky, nephew of the Tsar Vasili, liberates Moscow from rebels.

=== April–June ===
- April 10 – The Treaty of Brussol is signed between Charles Emmanuel I, Duke of Savoy, and a representative of King Henry IV of France, at a meeting at Bruzolo near Turin. The agreement for France and Savoy to remove Spanish occupiers from Italy, is never carried out because King Henry is assassinated one month later.
- April 20 – William Shakespeare's play, The Tragedie of Macbeth, is given its first performance, staged at the Globe Theatre in London.
- May 13 – A formal coronation is held for Marie de' Medici, wife of King Henry IV, as Queen Consort of France. King Henry is preparing to depart to Germany to participate in the War of the Jülich Succession.
- May 14 – King Henry IV of France is assassinated in Paris by François Ravaillac, a French Catholic activist who resents the Protestant monarch's decision to launch a war against the Catholic Spanish Netherlands. Ravaillac rushes up to a horse-drawn carriage and stabs King Henry in the chest. Henry's 8-year-old son becomes King Louis XIII, with Henry's widow, Marie de' Medici, governing France as queen regent.
- May 23 – Jamestown, Virginia: Acting as temporary Governor, Thomas Gates, along with John Rolfe, Captain Ralph Hamor, Sir George Somers, and other survivors from the Sea Venture (wrecked at Bermuda) arrive at Jamestown; they find that 60 have survived the "starving time" (winter), the fort palisades and gates have been torn down, and empty houses have been used for firewood, in fear of attacks by natives outside the fort area.
- May 24 – Jamestown, Virginia: The temporary Governor, Thomas Gates, issues The Divine, Moral, and Martial Laws.
- May 27 – Regicide François Ravaillac is executed by being pulled apart by horses in the Place de Grève, Paris.
- June 5 – The masque Tethys' Festival is performed at Whitehall Palace to celebrate the investiture of Henry Frederick, Prince of Wales.
- June 7 – Jamestown: Temporary Governor Gates decides to abandon Jamestown.
- June 8 – Jamestown: Temporary Governor Gates' convoy meets the ships of Governor Thomas West, 3rd Baron De La Warr (Delaware) at Mulberry Island.
- June 10 – Jamestown: The convoy of temporary Governor Gates, and the ships of Governor Lord De La Warr, land at Jamestown.
- June 24 – Henri Membertou, Grand Chief of Mi'kmaq nation, becomes the first North American aboriginal person to accept baptism into the Christian faith and signs the Concordat of 1610, an agreement with the Roman Catholic Church recognizing the Mi'kmaq as an independent nation.

=== July–September ===
- July 4 – (June 24 O.S.); Polish–Russian War – Battle of Klushino: The outnumbered forces of the Polish–Lithuanian Commonwealth defeat the combined Russian and Swedish armies; Polish troops go on to occupy Moscow.
- July 5 – John Guy sets sail from Bristol, with 39 other colonists, for Newfoundland.
- July 9 – Lady Arbella Stuart, a claimant to the throne of England, is imprisoned for clandestinely marrying William Seymour, 2nd Duke of Somerset, another claimant, without royal permission on June 22.
- July 27 (July 17 O.S.) – Vasili Ivanovich Shuisky, who proclaimed himself Tsar of Russia on May 19, 1606, is deposed as the Seven Boyars remove him from office to select a new ruler.
- July 28 – War of the Jülich Succession: The Siege of Jülich, a walled city within the Holy Roman Empire (now in Germany), is started by a combined force of troops from the Dutch Republic, the Kingdom of France and the Margraviate of Brandenburg.
- August 2 – Henry Hudson sails into what is now known as Hudson Bay, thinking he has made it through the Northwest Passage and reached the Pacific Ocean.
- August 9 – Anglo-Powhatan Wars: The English launch a major attack on the Paspahegh village, capturing and executing the native queen and her children, burning houses and chopping down the corn fields; the subsequent use of the term "Paspahegh" in documents refers to their former territory.
- September 1 – Claudio Monteverdi's musical work Vespro della Beata Vergine (Vespers for the Blessed Virgin) is first published, printed in Venice and dedicated to Pope Paul V.
- September 2 – The Siege of Jülich ends as the Holy Roman Imperial city surrenders to Maurice of Nassau, commander of the Dutch Republic troops.
- September 4 – The Kingdom of Toungoo (now Myanmar) is retaken by King Anaukpetlun of Burma, as rebel leader Natshinnaung surrenders the city of Taungoo.
- September 6 – (August 27 O.S.); The Seven Boyars, the group of seven Russian nobles seeking stability in the troubled nation, vote to have King Wladyslaw IV of Poland as Tsar Vladislav of Russia, and invite the Polish-Lithuanian Commonwealth to take over the city.
- September 19 – Frederick V, age 14, becomes the new Prince-Elector of the Rhineland Palatinate, two days after the death of his father, Frederick IV.
- September 21 (September 11 O.S.) – Forces of the Polish-Lithuanian Commonwealth capture Moscow and begin occupation of the Kremlin for the next two years.

=== October–December ===
- October 9 – Poland, under the command of Hetman Stanisław Żółkiewski, takes control of the Kremlin during the Polish–Russian War.
- October 17 – The coronation of Louis XIII of France takes place.
- October 24 – The War of the Jülich Succession ends as the Protestant Union (including Margraviate of Brandenburg Brandenburg and Electoral Palatinate) and the Catholic League (led by the Duchy of Bavaria) agree to withdraw their forces from Germany and to disband them by year's end.
- November 6 – After the Parliament of England gives King James only £ 100,000 of an agreed to £ 600,000 of debt relief promised in February under the Great Contract, the King demands the rest of the funds. Parliament is outraged and declares the Contract abandoned on November 9.
- November 8 – The Basque witch trials come to an end after almost two years. Out of about 7,000 persons accused of witchcraft, only six are condemned to be executed by the Spanish Inquisition as two men (Domingo de Subildegui and Petri de Joangorena) and four women (María de Echachute, Graciana Xarra, Maria Baztan de Borda, and Maria de Arburu) are burned at the stake at Logroño.
- November 20 – The cession of Larache, a port in Morocco, takes place as Mohammed esh Sheikh el Mamun, Sultan of Morocco, transfers control of the city to Spain in return for. The Marquis de la Hinojosa accepts on behalf of King Felipe III of Spain in return for Spain's aid to the Sultan's fight against the Sultan's brother, Zidan Abu Maali. Larache remains under Spanish control for the next 79 years until another sultan retakes it.
- November 26 – French astronomers Nicolas-Claude Fabri de Peiresc and Joseph Gaultier make the first detailed observations of the Orion Nebula.
- December 18 – (December 8 O.S.) English astronomer Thomas Harriot becomes the first person on Earth to observe sunspots through a telescope.
- December 19 – Pieter Both becomes the first Governor-general of the Dutch East Indies (now the Republic of Indonesia), serving until 1614.
- December 20 – (December 10 O.S.), John Roberts, a Benedictine monk in Wales, is executed five days after being convicted of high treason for violating a law against Catholic ministry. He is hanged, drawn and quartered. Roberts will be canonized as a Roman Catholic saint almost 360 years later, on October 25, 1970.
- December 21 – (December 11 O.S.) The second False Dmitry is assassinated by a Kasim Tatar prince, Peter Urusov. After both Dmitry and Urosov have been drinking, Urusov shoots the Tsar Dmitry, then decapitates him.

=== Date unknown ===
- Dr. Bonham's Case, a landmark decision, is decided by Edward Coke, Chief Justice of the Common Pleas of England. Coke affirms the supremacy of the common law, which limits the power of Parliament as well as the king.
- The Manchu tribal leader Nurhaci breaks his relations with the Ming dynasty of China, at this time under the aloof and growingly negligent Wanli Emperor; Nurhaci's line later becomes the emperors of the Qing dynasty, which overthrows the short-lived Shun dynasty in 1644, and the remnants of the Ming throne in 1662.
- Publication is completed of the Douay–Rheims Bible (The Holie Bible Faithfully Translated into English), a translation of the Bible from the Latin Vulgate into English made by members of the English College, Douai, in the service of the Catholic Church.
- Jakob Böhme experiences another inner vision, in which he believes that he further understands the unity of the cosmos, and that he has received a special vocation from God.
- Work starts on the Wignacourt Aqueduct, in Malta.
- Santa Fe, New Mexico, capital of New Mexico, is founded as capital of Kingdom of Nuevo México.

== Births ==
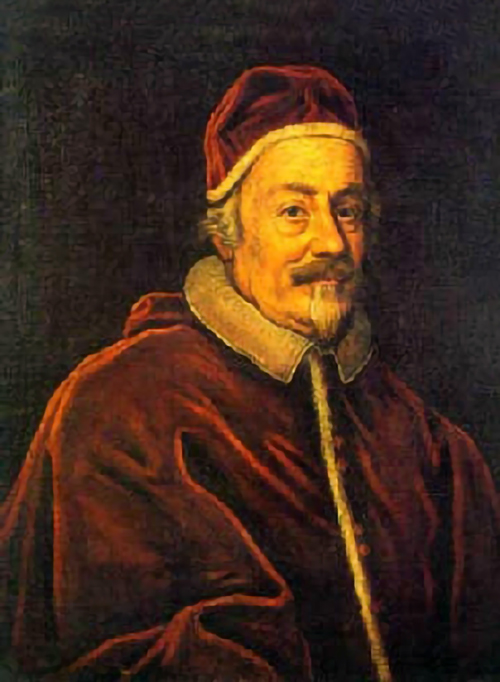
Pope Alexander VIII

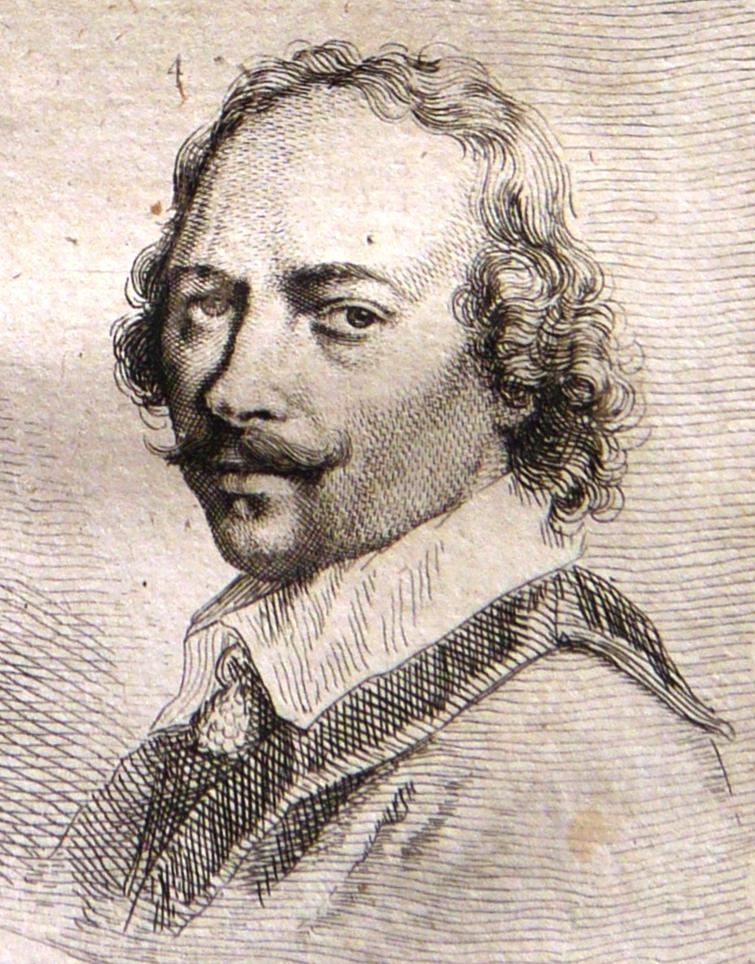
Hendrik Martenszoon Sorgh

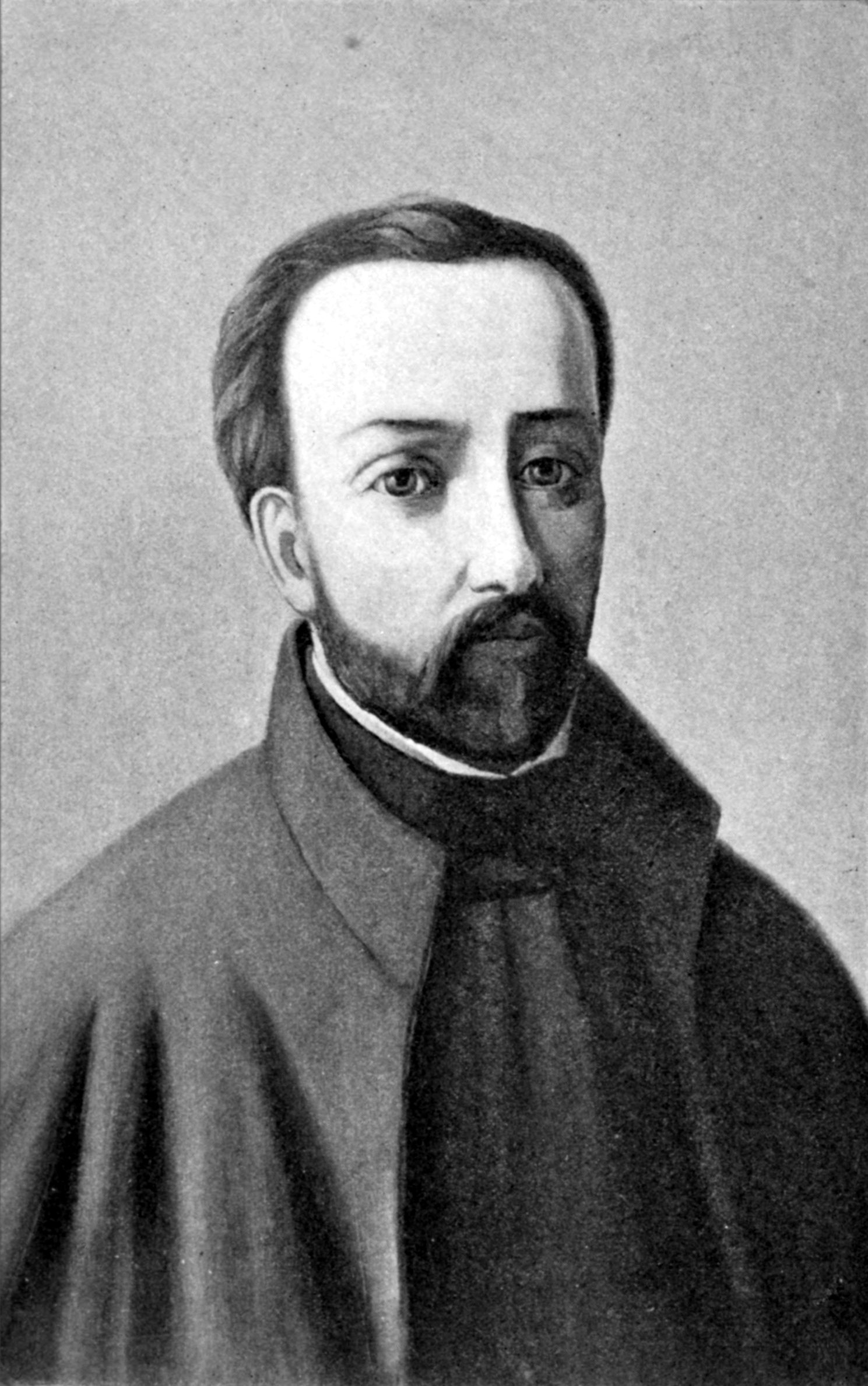
Gabriel Lalemant

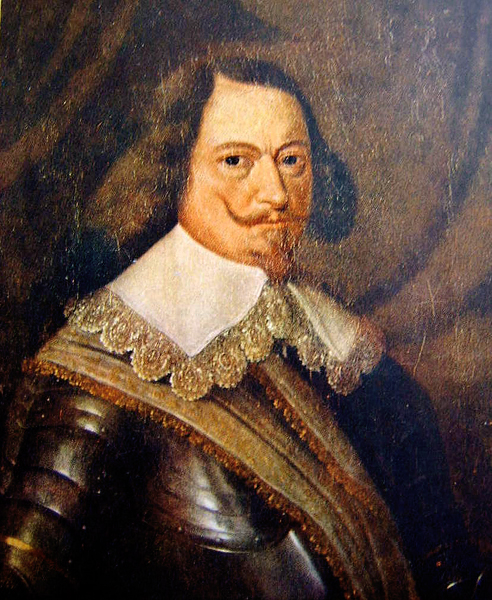
Jacob Kettler

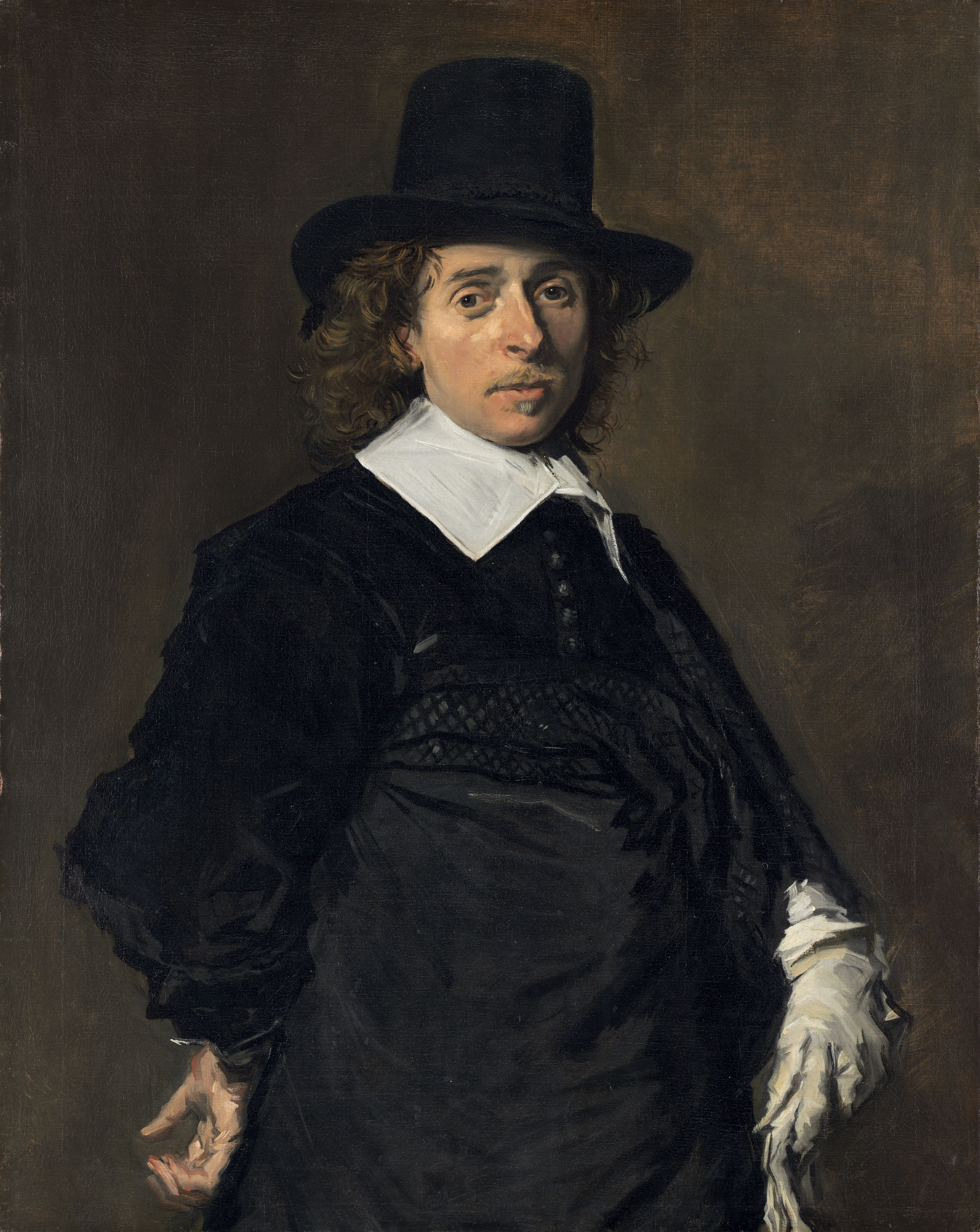
Adriaen van Ostade

=== January–March ===
- January 9 – George Wilde, Irish bishop (d. 1665)
- January 10 – Louis Maimbourg, French Jesuit historian (d. 1686)
- January 12 – Reinhold Curicke, jurist and historian from Danzig (d. 1667)
- January 13 – Archduchess Maria Anna of Austria, Electress of Bavaria (d. 1665)
- January 21 – Elizabeth Fones, American settler (d. 1673)
- January 26 – Henry Hildyard, English Member of Parliament (d. 1674)
- February 2
  - Francisco Ignacio Alcina, Jesuit missionary and historian (d. 1674)
  - Pierre Bourdelot, French physician (d. 1685)
  - Edmund Weaver, English politician (d. 1672)
- February 11 – Salomon Idler, German inventor (d. 1669)
- February 13 – Jean de Labadie, French pietist (d. 1674)
- February 14 – Solomon Swale, English politician (d. 1678)
- March 3 – Pierre Dupuis, French painter (d. 1682)
- March 4 (bapt.) – William Dobson, English portraitist and painter (d. 1646)
- March 14
  - Frederick Cornwallis, 1st Baron Cornwallis, English politician (d. 1662)
  - Simon Louis, Count of Lippe-Detmolt (1627–1636) (d. 1636)

=== April–June ===
- April 22 – Pope Alexander VIII (d. 1691)
- May 12 – Arent Berntsen, Norwegian statistician (d. 1680)
- May 17 – Joseph Poncet, French missionary (d. 1675)
- May 18 – Stefano della Bella, Italian printmaker (d. 1664)
- June 1 – Hendrik Martenszoon Sorgh, Dutch painter (d. 1670)
- June 17 – Birgitte Thott, Danish scholar, writer and translator (b. 1662)
- June 24 – Thomas Hales, Connecticut settler (d. 1679)

=== July–September ===
- July 2 – Francis Browne, 3rd Viscount Montagu in the Peerage of England (d. 1682)
- July 6 – Hugh Forth, English politician (d. 1676)
- July 8 (bapt.) – Richard Deane, English military commander and regicide (d. 1653)
- July 11 – William Widdrington, 1st Baron Widdrington, English landowner, politician (d. 1651)
- July 14 – Ferdinando II de' Medici, Grand Duke of Tuscany (d. 1670)
- July 18 – Antonio de Solís y Ribadeneyra, Spanish dramatist and historian (d. 1686)
- July 28 (bapt.) – Henry Glapthorne, English dramatist (d. c.1643)
- July 30 – Lorens von der Linde, Swedish field marshal (d. 1670)
- August 2 – Edward Master, English politician (d. 1691)
- August 4 – Cornelis Evertsen the Elder, Dutch admiral (d. 1666)
- August 23 – Susanna Margarete of Anhalt-Dessau, Princess of Anhalt-Dessau (d. 1663)
- September 4 – Giovanni Andrea Sirani, Italian painter (d. 1670)
- September 6
  - Francesco I d'Este, Duke of Modena, Italian noble (d. 1658)
  - Luke Robinson, English politician (d. 1669)
  - David Wemyss, 2nd Earl of Wemyss, Scottish earl (d. 1679)
- September 10 – Sir Edward Seymour, 3rd Baronet, Member of Parliament (d. 1688)
- September 24 – Huang Zongxi, Chinese political theorist, philosopher, naturalist, writer and soldier (d. 1695)
- September 28 – Henry Hastings, 1st Baron Loughborough, English Royalist army commander in the English Civil War (d. 1666)
- September 29 – Gabriel Druillettes, French missionary (d. 1681)

=== October–December ===
- October 3 – Gabriel Lalemant, Jesuit missionary in New France, beginning in 1646 (d. 1649)
- October 6 – Charles de Sainte-Maure, duc de Montausier, French soldier, the governor of the Louis (d. 1690)
- October 19 – James Butler, 1st Duke of Ormonde, Anglo-Irish statesman and soldier (d. 1688)
- October 28 – Jacob Kettler, German noble (d. 1682)
- November 8 – Pietro Vidoni, Italian Catholic cardinal (d. 1681)
- November 20 – Henry Heyman, English politician (d. 1658)
- November 22 – Duchess Marie Elisabeth of Saxony (d. 1684)
- November 28 – Augustine Warner, Virginia planter, politician (d. 1674)
- December 9 – Baldassare Ferri, Italian castrato singer (d. 1680)
- December 10 – Adriaen van Ostade, Dutch painter (d. 1685)
- December 15 – David Teniers the Younger, Flemish artist born in Antwerp (d. 1690)
- December 18 – Charles du Fresne, sieur du Cange, French philologist and historian (d. 1688)
- December 25
  - David Christiani, German mathematician and philosopher (d. 1688)
  - Charles Howard, 3rd Earl of Nottingham, son of Charles Howard (d. 1681)
- December 28 – Basil of Ostrog, Serbian Orthodox bishop venerated as Saint Vasilije (d. 1671)

=== Date unknown ===
- Dirck Rembrantsz van Nierop, Dutch astronomer and cartographer (d. 1682)
- Maria Cunitz, Silesian astronomer (d. 1664)
- Li Yu, Chinese writer (d. 1680)
- François Eudes de Mézeray, French historian (d. 1683)
- Karin Thomasdotter, Finnish official (d. 1697)
- Emmanuel Tzanes, Greek painter (d. 1690)
- Marie Meurdrac, French chemist and alchemist (d. 1680)
- Leonora Duarte, Flemish composer and musician (d. 1678)

=== Probable ===
- George Carteret, Jersey-born English Royalist statesman (d. 1680)
- Jeremias de Dekker, Dutch poet (d. 1666)
- Abraham Duquesne, French naval officer (d. 1688)
- Jin Shengtan, Chinese editor (d. 1661)

== Deaths ==
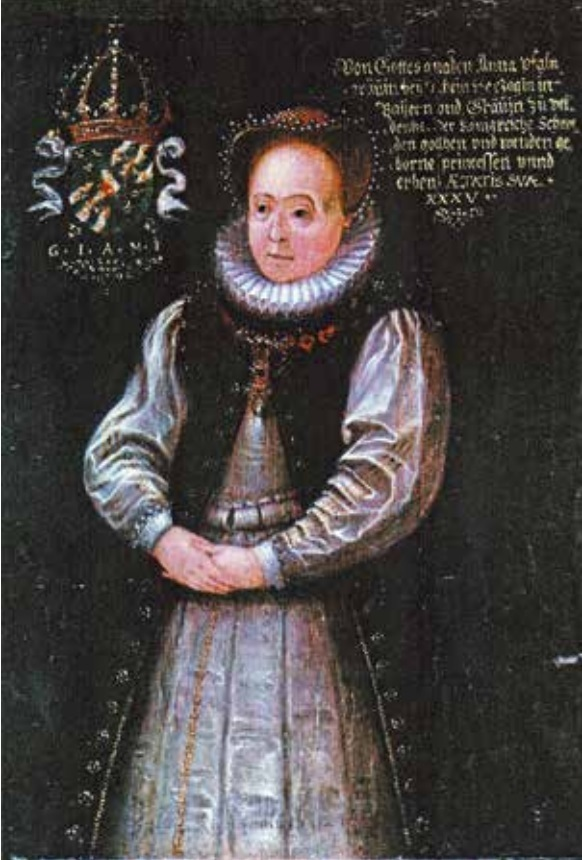
Princess Anna Maria of Sweden

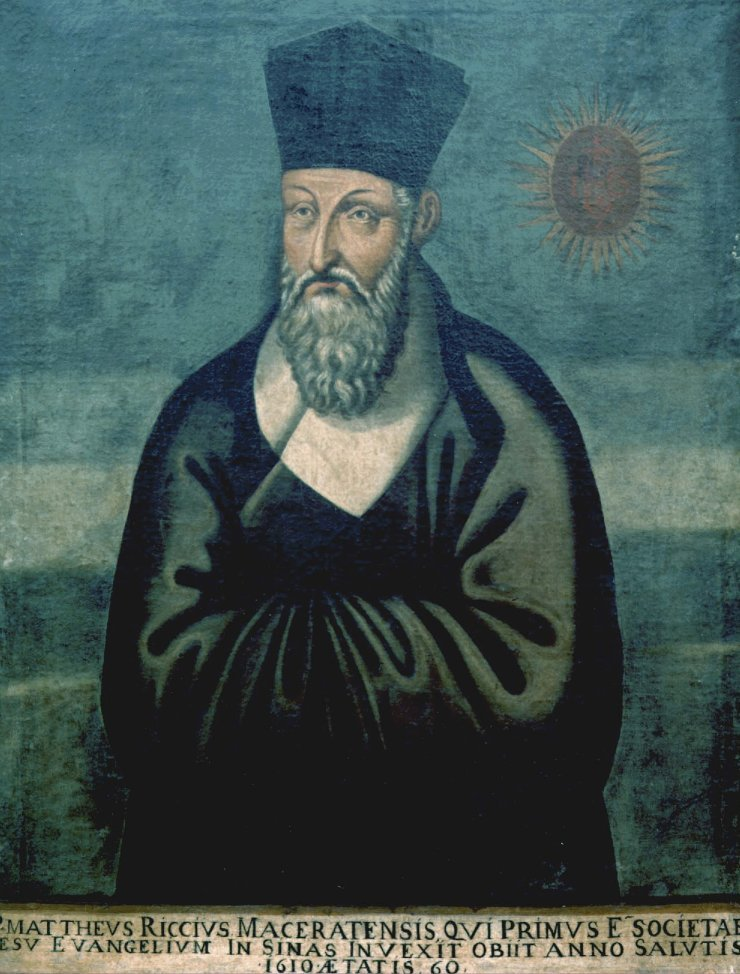
Servant of God Matteo Ricci

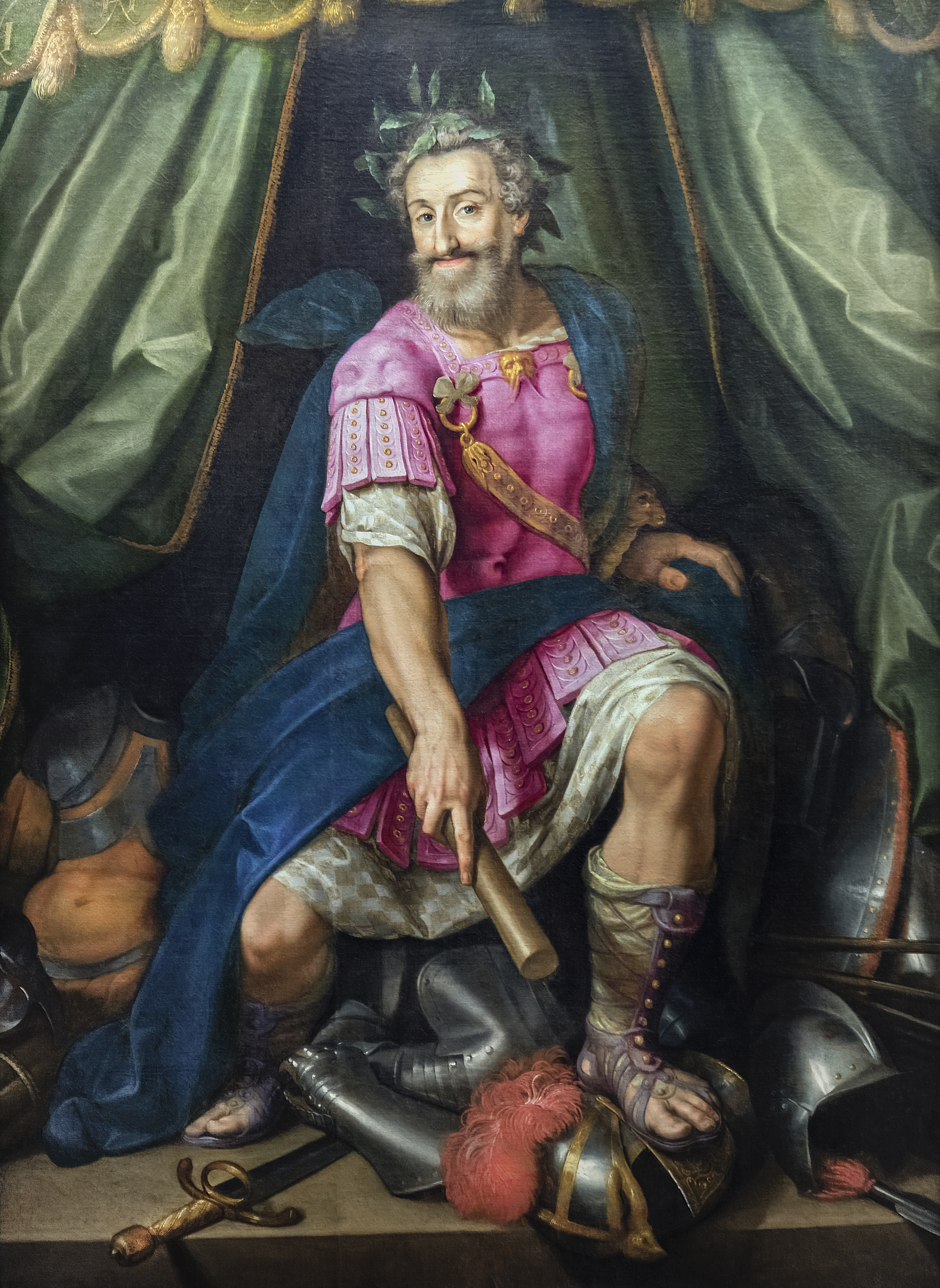
King Henry IV of France

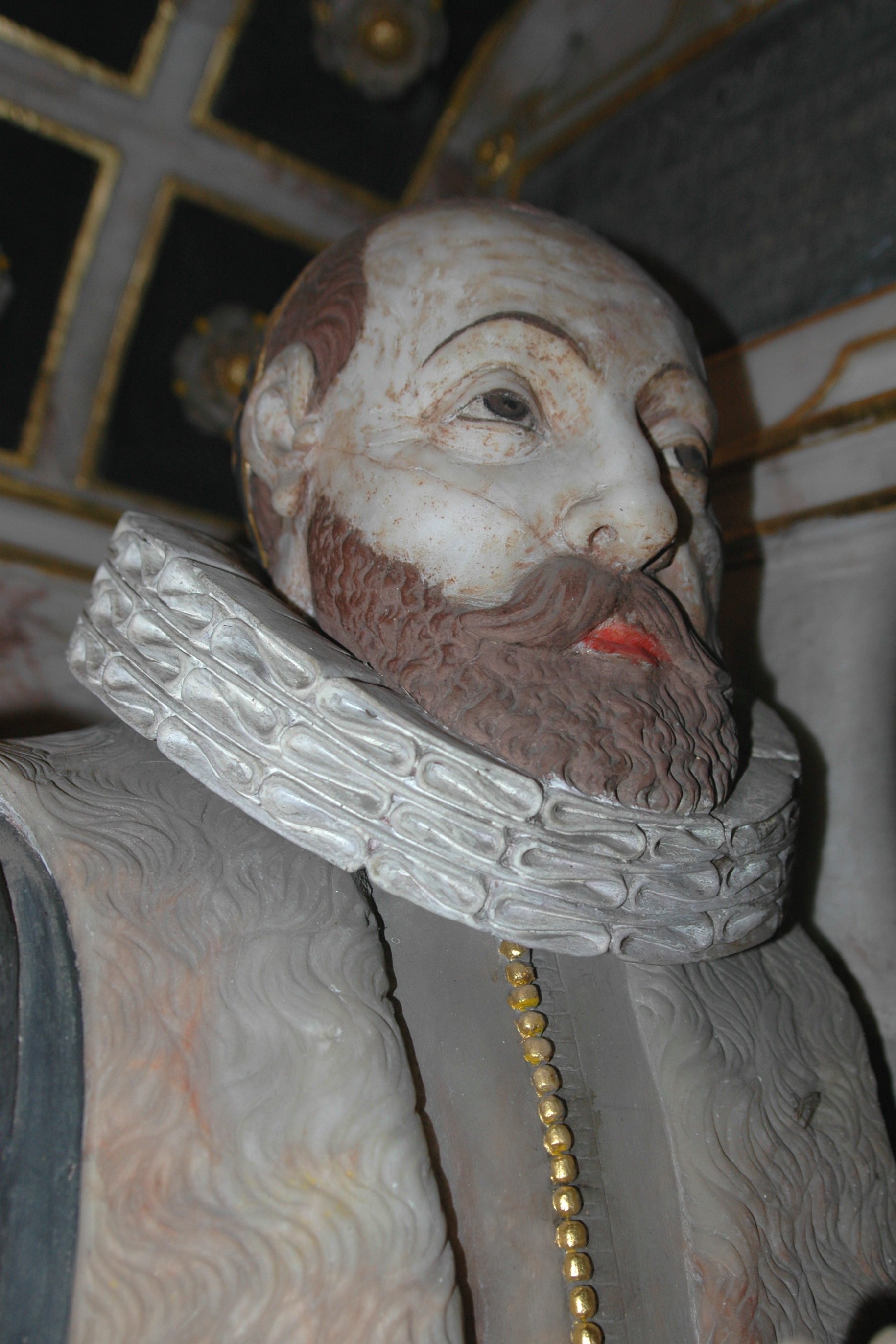
Thomas Tesdale

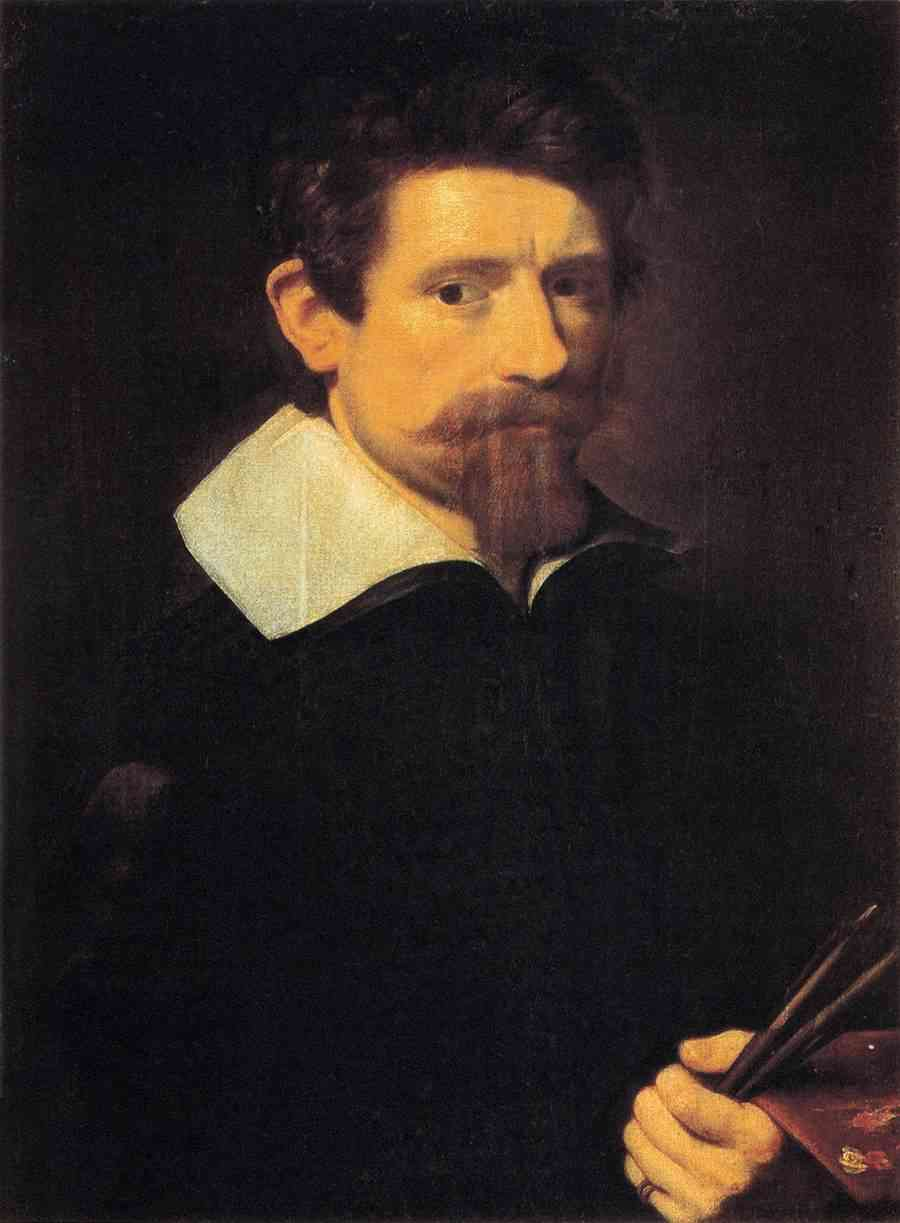
Adam Elsheimer

=== January–March ===
- January 1
  - Cinzio Passeri Aldobrandini, Italian Catholic cardinal (b. 1551)
  - François Feuardent, French theologian (b. 1539)
- January 9 – Herman van der Mast, Dutch Renaissance painter from the Northern Netherlands (b. c. 1550)
- January 10 – Mateo de Oviedo, Archbishop of Dublin (b. 1547)
- February 4 – Hannibal Vyvyan, English politician (b. 1545)
- February 5 – Strange Jørgenssøn, Norwegian businessman (b. 1539)
- February 22 – Polykarp Leyser the Elder, German theologian (b. 1552)
- February 27 – Philippe Canaye, French diplomat (b. 1551)
- March 4 – Maddalena Aceiaiuoli, Tuscan noblewoman and poet (b. 1557)
- March 6 – Benedict Pereira, Spanish theologian (b. 1535)
- March 7 – Maria, Abbess of Quedlinburg, German abbess (b. 1571)
- March 19
  - Valeriano Muti, Italian Catholic prelate (year of birth unknown)
  - Hasegawa Tōhaku, Japanese painter (b. 1539)
- March 20 – Princess Anna Maria of Sweden, Swedish royal (b. 1545)
- March 24 – Henry Cocke, English politician (b. 1538)
- March 28 – Wolfgang, Count of Hohenlohe-Weikersheim, German count (b. 1546)
- March 30 – Thomas Gorges, English knight (b. 1536)

=== April–June ===
- April 7 – Hirata Masumune, Japanese samurai (b. 1566)
- April 15 – Robert Parsons, English Jesuit priest (b. 1546)
- April 24 – Anna of Holstein-Gottorp, German noblewoman (b. 1575)
- May 11
  - Ikoma Kazumasa, Japanese samurai (b. 1555)
  - Matteo Ricci, Italian Jesuit priest and servant of God (b. 1552)
- May 14 – King Henry IV of France, (assassinated) (b. 1553)
- May 17 – Gervase Babington, English churchman (b. 1549)
- May 19 – Thomas Sanchez, Spanish theologian (b. 1550)
- May 27 – François Ravaillac, French assassin of Henry IV of France (executed) (b. 1578)
- June 4 – David Hilchen, Baltic German humanist and politician (b. 1561)
- June 13 – Thomas Tesdale, English maltster (b. 1547)

=== July–September ===
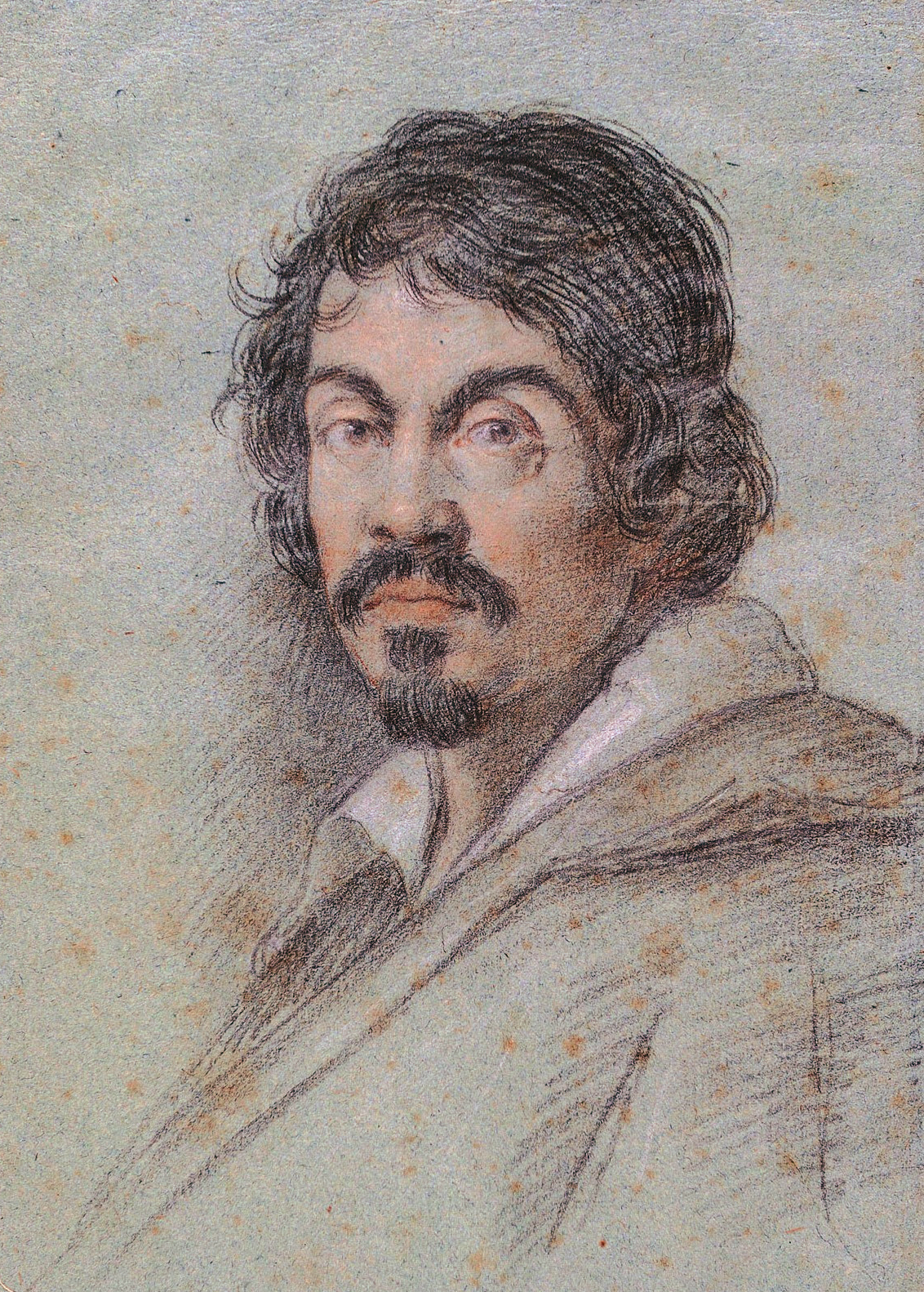
Caravaggio

- July – Richard Knolles, English historian (b. 1545)
- July 14 – Francis Solanus, Spanish friar and missionary in South America (b. 1549)
- July 17 – Amandus Polanus, German writer (b. 1561)
- July 18 – Michelangelo Merisi da Caravaggio, Italian painter active in Rome (b. 1571)
- July 22 – Charles I, Duke of Mecklenburg (b. 1540)
- July 27 – Jacob van Langren, Dutch cartographer and globe-maker (b. 1525)
- August 20 – Stanisław Stadnicki, Polish nobleman (b. 1551)
- August 25 – Mabel Browne, Countess of Kildare, Irish noble (b. 1536)
- September 13 – Tomás de Borja y Castro, Spanish Catholic archbishop (b. 1551)
- September 19 – Frederick IV, Elector Palatine (b. 1574)
- September 22 – Jan Moretus, Belgian printer (b. 1543)

=== October–December ===
- October 14 – Amago Yoshihisa, Japanese samurai and warlord (b. 1540)
- November 2 – Richard Bancroft, Archbishop of Canterbury (b. 1544)
- November 24 – Duchess Sophie of Prussia, duchess consort of Courland (1609–1610) (b. 1582)
- December 3 – Honda Tadakatsu, Japanese soldier (b. 1548)
- December 10 – John Roberts, Welsh Benedictine monk and priest (b. 1577)
- December 11
  - Adam Elsheimer, German artist working in Rome who died at only thirty-two (b. 1578)
  - False Dmitry II, pretender to the Russian throne
- December 21 – Catherine Vasa, Swedish princess (b. 1539)
- December 31 – Ludolph van Ceulen, German mathematician (b. 1540)
