= Graciana de Barrenechea =

Basque woman accused of devil-worship

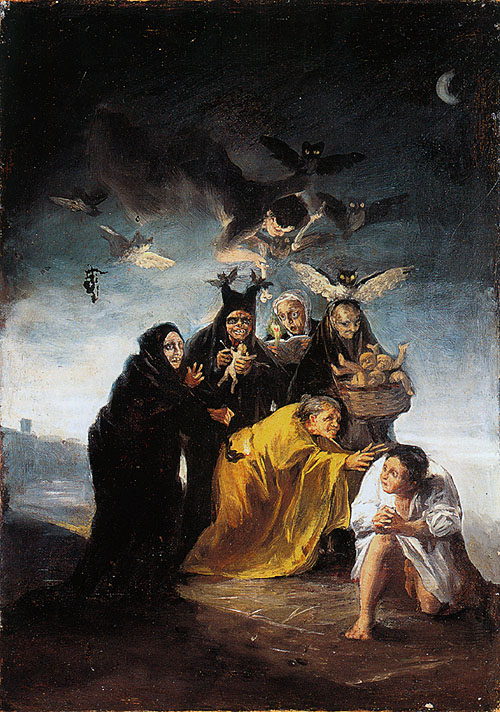
Francisco Goya's The Incantation: the witch in yellow may represent Graciana de Barrenechea.

Graciana de Barrenechea (Basque: Graziana Barrenetxea; c. 1530–1610) was a Basque woman accused of being a leading figure in devil-worship during the Basque witch trials. She died in prison prior to the 1610 auto-da-fé at Logroño, with her remains and an effigy burned instead.

== Family ==
Barrenechea's first husband was Juanes (or Joanes) de Yriarte, a shepherd. They had three daughters, including Estevanía and María de Yriarte; Estevanía married another shepherd, Juanes (or Joanes) de Goiburu, the son of a leading shepherd, Miguel de Goiburu. Barrenechea's second husband was Miguel's brother, also called Joanes de Goiburu. Other accounts say Barrenechea was the wife of Miguel.

They all lived in and around Zugarramurdi during the Basque witch trials, with scholars Mikel Azurmendi and Emma Wilby theorising that this extended family was a focal point of witchcraft accusations due to previously fighting for village freedom from the nearby Urdax monastery (which became the authority in local witch-hunting): Miguel was accused of being the ringleader of the akelarre, and Barrenechea was also accused of having been "queen" of the akelarre, preceding Maria de Arburu. Barrenechea's first husband and third daughter were the only ones not accused of being witches. The Zugarramurdi records feature perhaps the first association of a toad being the familiar of a witch, principally from accounts of toad poison making given by Barrenechea, María, and Juanes de Goiburu (the younger) when forced into confessions. Wilby considers it relevant that the profession of shepherd would have been likely to involve use of toads for veterinary medical purposes.

== Accusations of witchcraft and death ==
Barrenechea was over 80 years old when she was accused of being a witch; Argia wrote that she was 85. When Spanish Inquisition commissioner, and Urdax bishop, León Aranibar first interviewed Barrenechea on accusations of being a witch, he said "she was hesitant and variable in her statements." In her recorded confessions, Barrenechea apparently admitted to being "queen of the coven", of cannibalising dismembered children and exhumed bodies, and of having a love affair with the devil. She also confessed becoming so jealous of another woman, Marijuán de Odia, for the devil's affections that she and the devil poisoned Odia, who died three days later, with toad skin.

Besides confessions, there were many accusations against Barrenechea by children from when Barrenechea lived in Arraioz, claiming that she enticed them to the devil and tried to abduct them, with many public confrontations between the parents and Barrenechea. One accusation recounted by María de Echaleco said Barrenechea had "carried her through the air" to a field near a cave, then entered the cave and reappeared with the devil. Echaleco said she invoked the name of Christ, which caused Barrenechea and the devil to disappear.

The people of Arraioz prayed for her, and she subsequently thanked them for this, but then retracted her confessions of witchcraft, which angered them. She was imprisoned in the palace at Zugarramurdi for a period, but her "back-and-forth" confessing and retracting continued; the villagers went to Miguel de Narbart, associated with the Inquisition, to further interrogate her. As part of his attempt to make her confess, Narbart tied Barrenechea to a pillar with a chain around her neck. Her feet were bare, and people poured water on her feet, which caused pain from frost in the cold weather. A passer-by saw that Barrenechea could not speak, but could breathe; bystanders encouraged Barrenechea to commit herself to God, and then she died. Children who witnessed her death said the goat-devil appeared beside her at the moment she died.

Accounts suggest that the torture Barrenechea was subjected to in order to make her confess, while continuing to plead her innocence, led to her death in Narbart's prison. Among the people who witnessed her death, there is only record of one disapproving of her torture, with others dismissing it due to her age or suggesting she deserved the treatment. The archives of the Inquisition for the Logroño auto-da-fé show Barrenechea and Estevanía were convicted together of "so many things and deaths they can not be detailed in the sentence". The Inquisition found Barrenechea to be a particularly influential witch and gave her such a condemnatory sentence that, although she died before being tried, she still had to be punished. Both her remains and the effigy of her that had represented her in court were burned.

Barrenechea's two accused daughters also died in prison and were burned in effigy. In 1611, the royal council of the Inquisition absolved everyone tried of witchcraft at Logroño, and between 1612 and 1613 there was a class action trial heard at the Royal Court of Navarre, prosecuting multiple residents of Navarre for threats and attacks undertaken as part of their witch-hunting. As an associate of the Inquisition, Narbart had immunity but was still made to testify at the trial, and the prosecutor threatened him with murder charges in relation to Barrenechea's death. The defendants were found guilty and sentenced to periods of exile from Navarre.

== Legacy ==
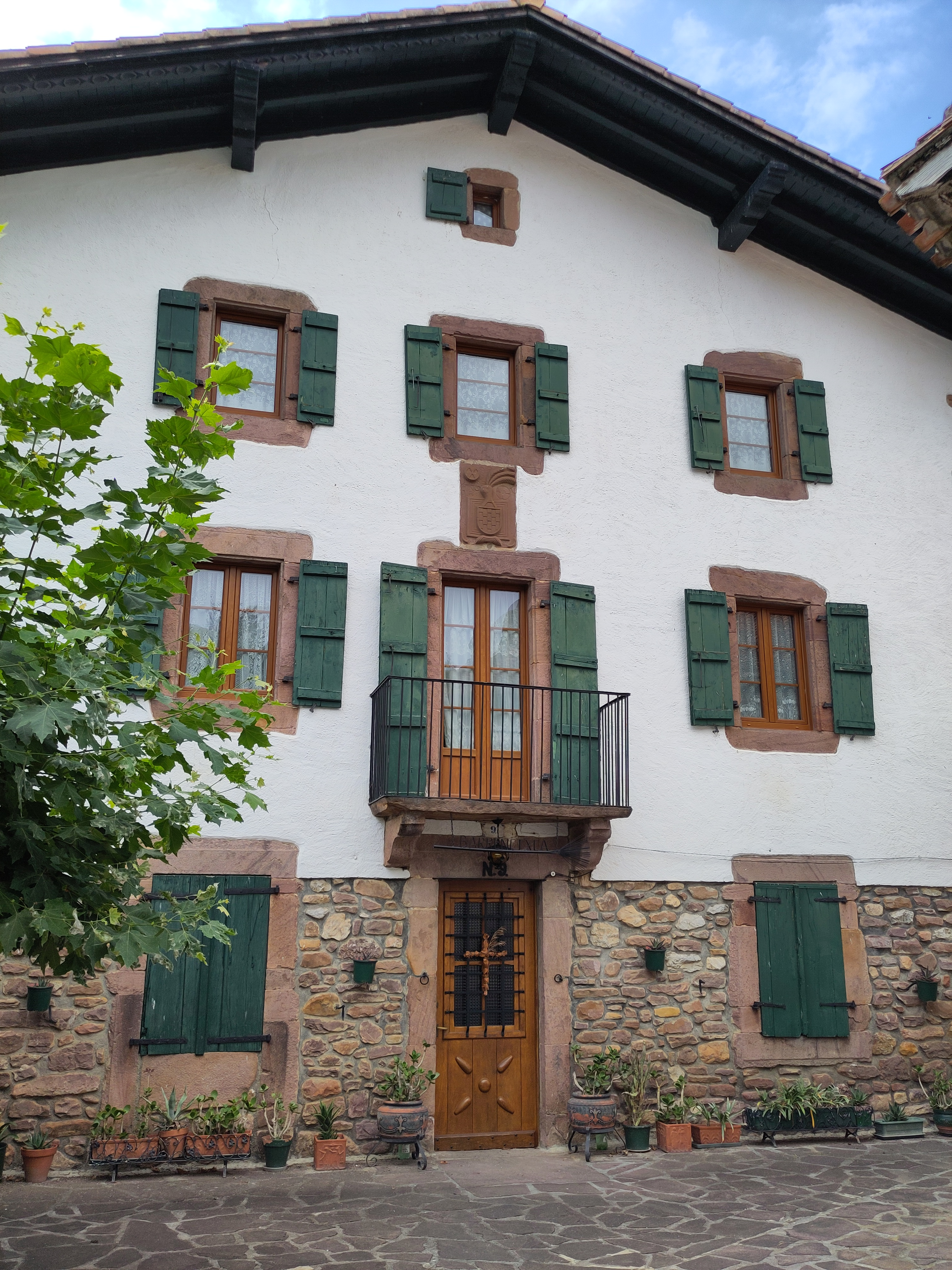
The Barrenetxea house in Zugarramurdi

Barrenechea's house in Zugarramurdi, near to the witches' caves, is marked with a scroll recounting her sentence. The confessions of Barrenechea feature early connections of witches with toads, vampirism, eating children and curses. Some art historians believe the figure in the yellow cloak in Francisco Goya's painting The Incantation is intended to represent Barrenechea and based on the story of her poisoning her rival. She was portrayed by Carmen Maura in the 2013 film Witching & Bitching, a horror-comedy that depicts Barrenechea "reveling in demonic-lubricious libertarian rituals"; Azurmendi has been particularly critical of this portrayal.
