= María de Yriarte =

Part of an auto-da-fé record mentioning a story of Yriarte (here spelt Iriarte)

María de Yriarte (also recorded Iriarte and Yriart; c. 1570–1610) was a Basque woman accused of witchcraft and vampirism during the Basque witch trials. She died in prison before being tried and burned in effigy at the stake in Logroño.

Yriarte was the daughter of Graciana de Barrenechea and Juanes (or Joanes) de Yriarte, a shepherd. She had two sisters, including fellow accused witch Estevanía; the family lived in and around Zugarramurdi. When questioned on accusations of witchcraft, the accounts of Yriarte, her mother, and her brother-in-law Juanes (or Joanes) de Goyburu provided the basis for further accusations of creating and using toad poison. This is perhaps the earliest association of a toad being the familiar of a witch.

Like her sister and mother, Yriarte died in prison before the Logroño auto-da-fé, but was still tried and her effigy was burned. According to El Diario Vasco, she was 40 years old when she died. Records of the 1610 auto-da-fé include stories of the accused witches' sexual relations with the devil: Yriarte had confessed to having been given by her mother to the devil as a virgin for intercourse "in both parts", which left her bloodied and in pain. She also confessed that the devil encouraged her to drink poison she had prepared, which she refused, and that she used poisons and powders to kill three men, one woman, and four other people. The most prominent of Yriarte's confessions were those recounting how she killed various animals and people, many children, through blood-sucking, including drinking the blood of nine children from their genitals.

Yriarte provided the names of her supposed victims, with later investigation deducing they died of other causes. Also heard at the auto-da-fé was supposed evidence of the witches being harmed by the invocation of Jesus; in one story confessed by Yriarte as well as Goiburu, a French witch visited their coven and danced so impressively that Yriarte cried out "Jesus! What a thing!", causing the entire ceremony to disappear around her and for her to subsequently be severely punished.

She was posthumously absolved of any crime. As of 2025, her house in Zugarramurdi, like her mother's, is still standing. Known as the Iriartea, it has been converted into a country house.
