= Akerbeltz =

Spirit in Basque mythology

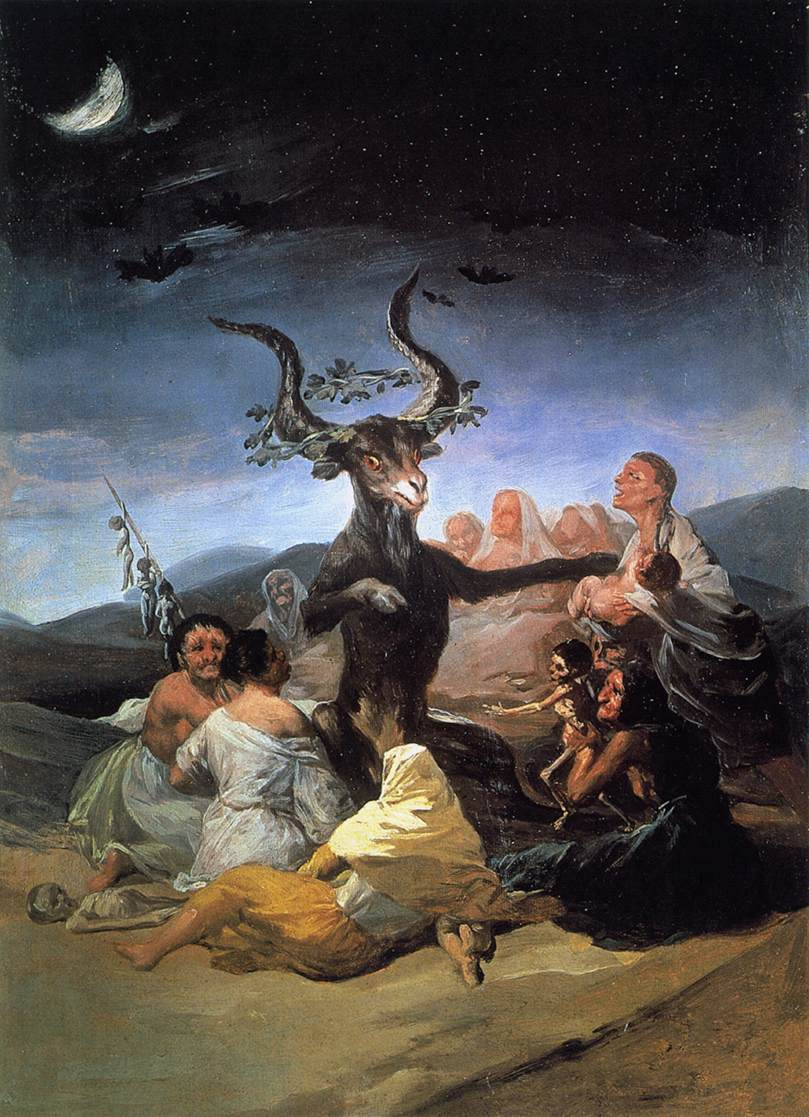
El aquelarre, Francisco Goya.

Akerbeltz or Aker (from Basque aker, 'billy goat' and beltz, 'black') is a spirit in the folk mythology of the Basque people. It is said to live inside the land and is believed to have as many elves as servants. In Christianity, Akerbeltz is considered the live image of the devil, performing sexual abuses against Christians.

Contemporary belief holds that Akerbeltz was an ancient deity who protected animals. The billy goat was adored in other European countries as well as the Basque Country. Some beliefs about this mythological creature have endured.

== During history and in other mythologies ==
Pierre de Lancre, an inquisitor who went looking for women from Labourd and Lower Navarre who were supposed to be witches, wrote a book called Tableu de I´Inostance in which he documented the testimony of a supposed witch: "Akerbeltz has a man's face, big and terrifying". Another witch said that he had two faces, one in front and the other one in the back.

In words of other inquisitors, Akerbeltz was similar to an enormous dog or to a big ox which is incorrect or lies. This last case could be related to the myth of the Aatxe (another creature of the Basque mythology). As men who look for witches said, Aker gave a parody of the Catholic mass to his followers, and during the mass, they offer him eggs, bread and money.

In the mass explained before, Aker gave a parody sermon, and after that speech, he organised a lunch with his witches and elves. In that lunch it was served human-meat and his horns functioned as gigantic candles. To continue with the celebration, Aker and his followers danced together with the sound of a tabor. And finally, the witches made their spells.

Folklorists say that Akerbeltz was similar to some ancient deities such as Dionysus, in terms of excesses, and Pan, in terms of sexual abuses.

Jose Miguel Barandiaran, who investigated and compiled the Basque culture, said that the picture of Akerbeltz was similar to Mari (another spirit from the Basque mythology) because they had some characteristics in common.

There were some other beliefs which say that he was the animals' and houses' protector, and he had the power for treating the animals. He was also the life image of the fertility. And as he was black, many people from the Basque Country had had a black billy-goat in their stable in order to protect the rest of the animals.

== Tales ==
- He had the power for creating storms and to dress the animals he had under his care. That is why in some Baserri they used to have a billy-goat.
- He was supposed to be in the entrance of the caves of Zugarramurdi where elves, lamia, and witches met.

Once a priest entered in a cave with a host. While he was touching the gold he was wearing, a snake appeared and ate his hands so he left the cave without hands. From inside the cave some mysterious voices could be heard, and they said :" thanks what you were wearing in your chest, because if not you will have to stay here". After this, it can be heard a Basque saying which says: "Auza, han baduk gauza; baina neok ezin har".

- Neighbours from Baigorri say that Aker's ghost lived in some caves in the area.
- In Urepel, from the Biurretabuxtan baserri Juan Monakok said that there was a cave full of gold, and near that gold there were a snake and Aker. Many times had a priest gone praying to the cave so that the snake and Akerbeltz go, but they have never gone from there.

== Other beliefs ==
- Black billy-goats have always been very valuable in Aragon and in the Basque Pyrenees because as the myths say, they can take care of the rest of the animals and the house.
- People from the Pyrenees thought that witches, Akerbeltz and the demon could go to any house and take the beard from a billy-goat in order to make hail. That is the reason why in Freser they have always said: "A la casa han tosa la cabra, aquesta tarde tindrem pedra"; "They have cut the billy goat's beard, this afternoon it is going to hail".

== See also ==
- Akelarre
