= Akelarre =

Basque for Witches' Sabbath

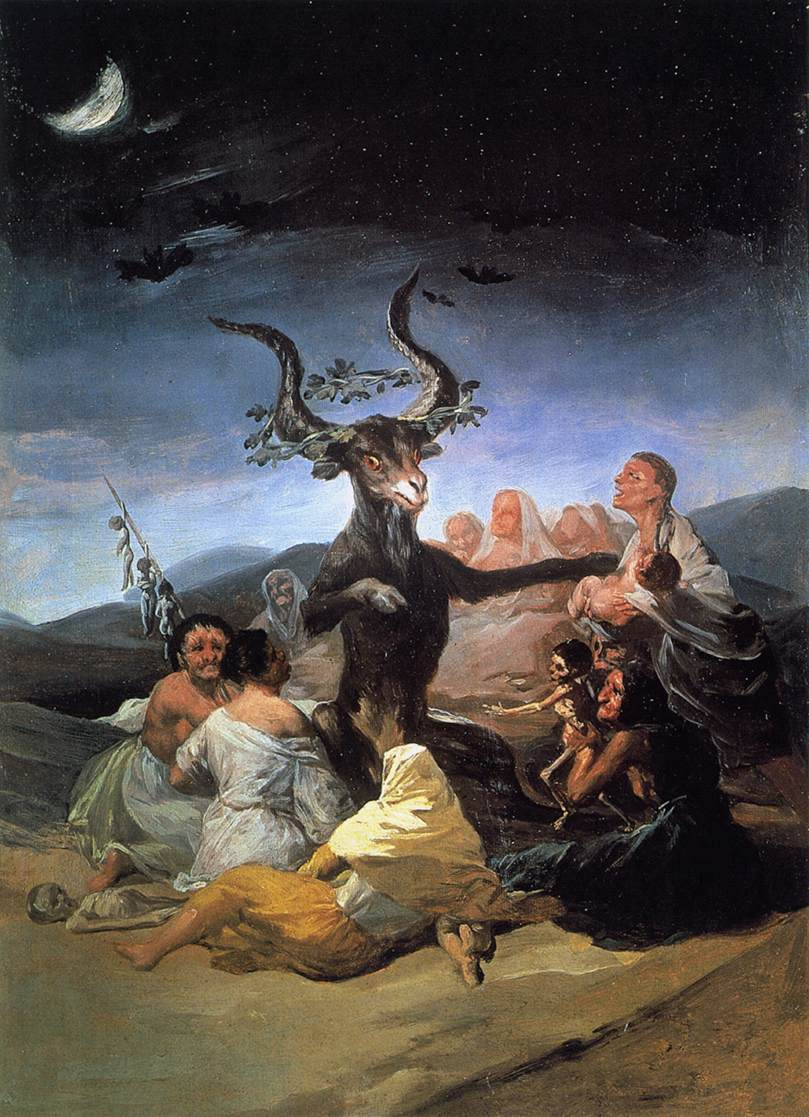
Witches' Sabbath (1798), by Francisco Goya.

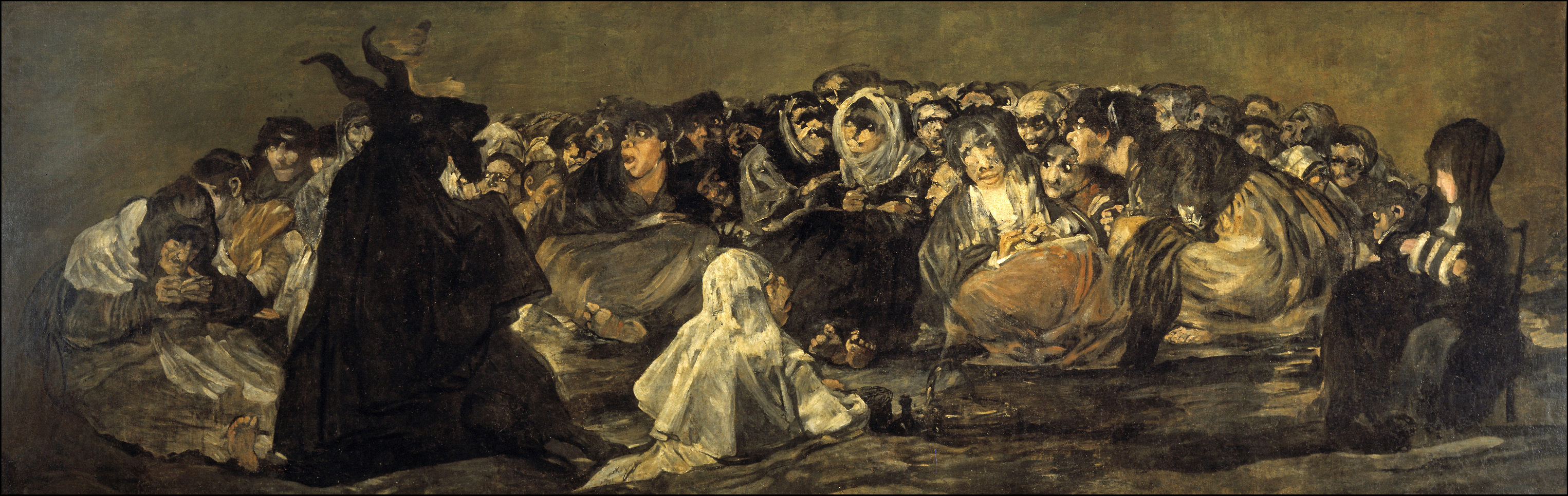
Akelarre, by Francisco Goya

Akelarre (Spanish: El Aquelarre) is a Basque term meaning Witches' Sabbath (a gathering of those practicing witchcraft). Aker means male goat in the Basque language. Witches' sabbaths were envisioned as presided over by a goat.

The word has been loaned to Castilian Spanish (which uses the spelling Aquelarre). It has been used in Castilian Spanish since the Basque witch trials of the 17th century. The word is most famous as the title of the witchcraft painting by Francisco Goya in the Museo del Prado, which depicts witches in the company of a huge male goat.

== Etymology ==
The most common etymology proposed is that meaning meadow (larre) of the male goat (aker "buck, billy goat"). The Spanish Inquisition accused people of worshipping a black goat, related to the worship of Satan. An alternative explanation could be that it originally was alkelarre, alka being a local name for the herb Dactylis hispanica. In this case, the first etymology would have been a manipulation of the Inquisition, the fact being that the Basques did not know during the 1609-1612 persecution period or later what the "akelarre" referred to by the inquisitors meant. The word "aquelarre" is first attested in 1609 in a Spanish-language inquisitorial briefing, as synonym to junta diabólica, meaning 'diabolic assembly'. Basque terms, transcribed into Spanish texts often by monolingual Spanish-language copyists, were fraught with mistakes.

Nevertheless, the black he-Goat or Akerbeltz is known in Basque mythology to be an attribute of goddess Mari and is found in a Roman-age slab as a votive dedication: Aherbelts Deo ("to the god Aherbelts") (see: Aquitanian language)..

== Places called Akelarre ==
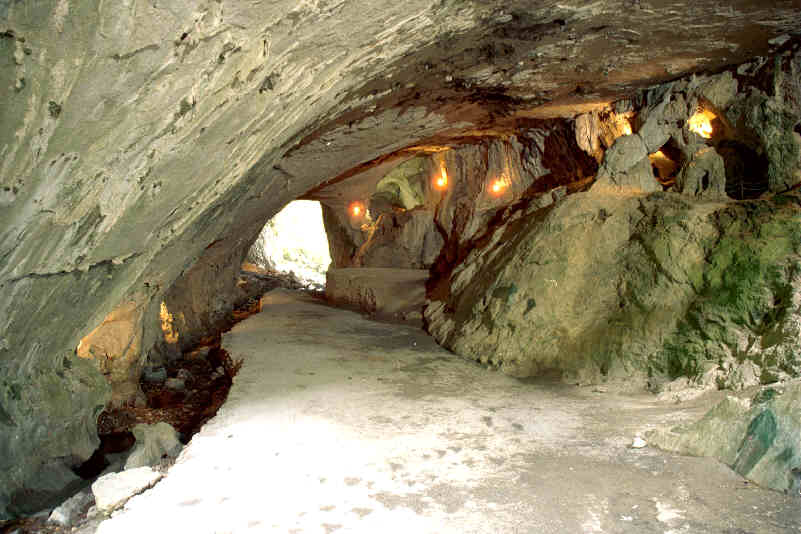
Akelarrenlezea in Zugarramurdi, Navarre

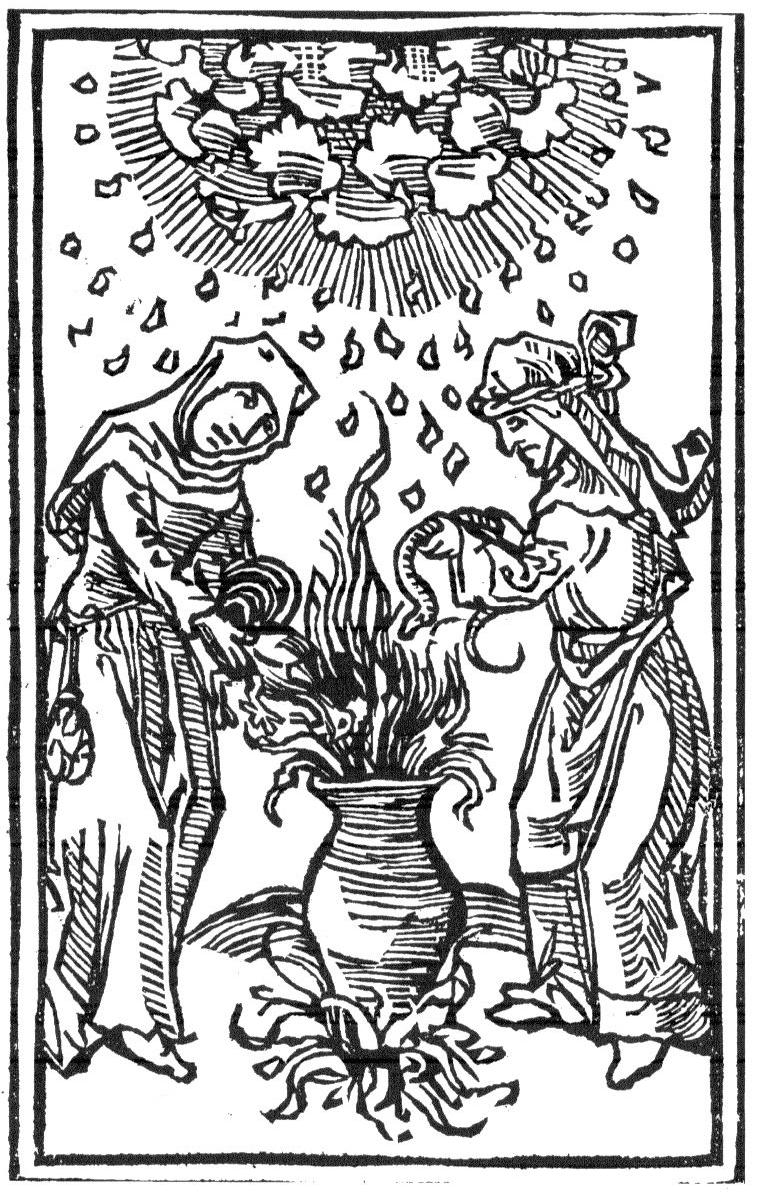
Witches around the caldron

- Akelarre: a field of Mañaria (Biscay).
- Akelarrenlezea: a large cave of Zugarramurdi (Navarre). The witches met actually outside the cave in the place of Berroskoberro. Some say that the goat talked to its worshippers from a hole in the stone outside the cave. Inside the cave, the widest part measures 120 metres. The river of "hell" crosses along the centre of the cave. It has been eroding the floor of the cave for centuries, the ceiling of the cave is already 12 metres high. A limestone oven from the eighteenth century remains inside the biggest cave. Farmers found it useful to take more harvest out of the limestone oven. We can access another cave from the biggest cave: the cave of the Akelarre. The name of the cave derives from the meadow at the entrance of the cave. Akelarre used to be celebrated there. Further the river follows a deep gorge called "the cave of the witches".

Other expressive names used for sabbat meeting places in Basque culture include:

- Eperlanda: Partridges' field, in Muxika (Biscay).
- Dantzaleku: Dancing place, between Ataun and Idiazabal (Gipuzkoa).
- Mandabiita: in Ataun (Gipuzkoa).
- Sorginzulo: Witches' hole, in Zegama and another one in Ataun, (both in Gipuzkoa).
- Bekatu-larre: Sinful meadow, in Ziordia (Navarre).
- Sorgintxulo: Witches' hole, a cave in Hernani (Gipuzkoa).
- Atsegin Soro: Pleasure orchard. This was the name by which witches themselves called the field of Matxarena in Errenteria (Gipuzkoa), according to inquisitorial records.
- Basajaunberro: Site of Basajaun (the wild man of the woods), in Auritz (Navarre).
- Sorginerreka: Witches' creek, in Tolosa (Gipuzkoa).
- Edar Iturri: Beautiful Spring, in Tolosa (Gipuzkoa).
- Sorginetxe: Witches' house, in Aia (Gipuzkoa).
- Akerlanda: Goat's meadow, in Gautegiz Arteaga (Biscay).
- Anboto: in Durango (Biscay).
- Garaigorta: in Orozko (Biscay).
- Petralanda: in Dima (Biscay).
- Urkitza: in Urizaharra (Alava).
- Abadelaueta: in Etxaguen (Zigoitia, Alava).
- Irantzi, Puilegi, Mairubaratza: in Oiartzun (Gipuzkoa).
- Larrun mountain: Witches from Bera (Navarre), Sara and Azkaine (Lapurdi) gathered.
- Jaizkibel mountain: in Hondarribia (Gipuzkoa). The inquisition heard they celebrated Akelarre near the church of Santa Barbara. Local sayings believe that there were Akelarres in the bridges of Mendelu, Santa Engrazi and Puntalea.

== Zugarramurdi witch-hunt ==
In 1610, the Spanish Inquisition tribunal of Logroño initiated a large witch-hunt in Zugarramurdi and villages around Navarre that resulted in 300 people being accused of practising witchcraft. They took 40 of them to Logroño and burnt at the stake 12 supposed witches in Zugarramurdi (5 of them symbolically, as they had been killed by torture earlier). Julio Caro Baroja in his book The World of the Witches explains that Basque witchcraft is known due to this witch-hunt, being one of the most infamous between the European witch-hunts. It was possibly as a result of these major trials that the term akelarre became synonymous with the word "witch's sabbath" and spread into common parlance in both Basque and Spanish.

While previous study of the Zugarramurdi trials has focused on the mechanics of persecution, more recent analysis by Emma Wilby has explored how the suspects themselves brought a wide range of belief and experience to their descriptions of the akelarre, from folk magical practices, communal medicine-making and confraternal meetings to popular expressions of Catholic religious ritual and theatre such as liturgical misrule and cursing masses.

== Similar celebrations ==
Similar celebrations spread over the Pyrenees mountains in the Basque Country, Aragon, Catalonia and Occitania. Shepherds brought these beliefs on the way of their annual migration of sheep (transhumance) from mountains to the flatlands.

- "Ajunt de Bruixes", in Catalonia, the most famous of all being celebrated in Canigó mountain, origin of the storms that witches sent to the plain.
- Turbon mountain, in Huesca.
- The mountains on top of the village Pals, in Girona, Catalonia.
- Macizo de Anaga in Tenerife, Canary Islands.
- Salamanca cave, in Salamanca.

== See also ==
- Aquelarre (role-playing game)
- List of Spanish words of Basque origin
- Basque witch trials
- European witchcraft
- Pierre de Lancre, French witchhunter
- Sorginak (Basque witches)
- Spanish Inquisition
- Tomás de Torquemada, leader of the Spanish Inquisition
- Witch-hunt
- Witchcraft

== Sources ==
- Brujería en el País Vasco, José Dueso, Orain S.A., 1996. ISBN 84-89077-55-X
- Guía del Akelarre Vasco, José Dueso, ROGER Ed., 2000. ISBN 84-8490-001-0
