= Maria de Arburu =

Spanish alleged witch

Maria de Arburu (died 1 November 1610 in Logrono, Spain) was a Spanish alleged witch. She was one of the people charged with sorcery in the Basque witch trials (1609–1614), and one of only six people executed of 7,000 who were accused.

She was the widow of the milner Juanes de Martinena.

She was arrested by the inquisitor Valle Alvarado in 1609. She was charged with witchcraft and participation in the witches' sabbath in Zugarramurdi. She was investigated by the Spanish Inquisition in Logroño.

Of about 7,000 people accused in the Basque witch trials, only six were ultimately executed: Domingo de Subildegui, María de Echachute, Graciana Xarra, Maria Baztan de Borda, Maria de Arburu and Petri de Joangorena. They were condemned to be executed by the Inquisition because they had repeatedly refused to confess, regret and ask for mercy, despite having been accused for a number of sorcery acts by several different people. She was accused of having succeeded Graciana de Barrenechea as the "queen of Aquelarre".

She and five others were burned alive at the stake on an autodafé in Logrono 1 November 1610, alongside the effigies of five other condemned people, who had died in prison prior to the execution. Both the Arburu and Martinena families had been involved in a meeting 30 years prior, which gave Zugarramurdi more independence from the nearby monastery. Scholars Mikel Azurmendi and Emma Wilby note the almost entire overlap between the families who challenged the monastery and those which the abbot-commissioner pursued for charges of witchcraft; they speculate that the enthusiasm to hunt witches was principally revenge.
