= David Christiani =

German mathematician, philosopher and Lutheran theologian

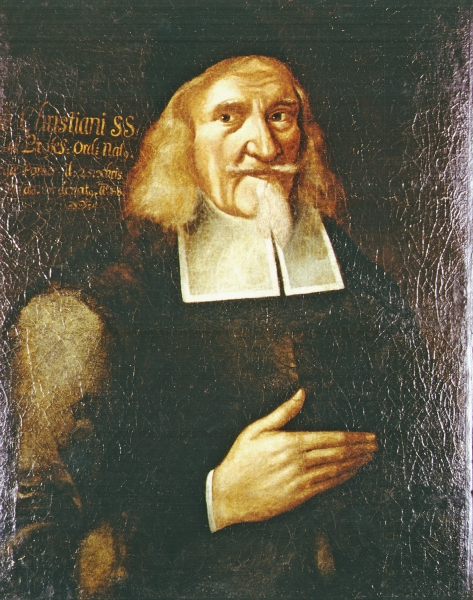
Portrait from the Gießener Professorengalerie

David Christiani (25 December 1610 – 13 February 1688) was a German mathematician, philosopher and Lutheran theologian. He became an ordinary professor of mathematics at the University of Marburg in 1643, ordinary professor of theology at the University of Giessen in 1681, and rector of the University of Giessen in 1686.
