= Baldassare Ferri =

Italian castrato singer (1610–1680)

Baldassare Ferri (9 December 1610 – 10 September 1680) was an Italian castrato singer. He is said to have possessed "extraordinary endurance of breath, flexibility of voice and depth of emotion".

== History ==
He was born in Perugia, and at the age of eleven was a chorister to Cardinal Crescenzi, at Orvieto. In his youth, he had an 'ugly accident', which necessitated an 'operation which permanently preserved his magnificent soprano voice'. He remained a chorister in Orvieto until 1655, when the Swedish invasion broke up the court. Four years later, the Prince, and later Wladislaus IV, of Poland, secured Ferri's services for the Court of Sigismund III, at Warsaw. In 1655, the singer entered the service of Ferdinand III in Vienna.

He received many honours from royalty and the nobles of various countries and was one of the most renowned singers of his time. In 1654, he journeyed to Sweden to sing by request before Queen Christine, his voice even then being famous throughout Europe. He was made a knight of St. Mark of Venice in 1643, sonnets were written in his honour, and he was crowned by his countrymen with roses. Five years before his death, Ferri returned to his native country. He died exceedingly rich and left a great deal of money to charity. His voice was a wonderful organ, a beautiful soprano, with a limpid quality that musicians of the time declared was "indescribable." His intonation was perfect, and all musicians spoke of his length of breath, which was almost inexhaustible, and at all times his singing was quiet and expressive. While singing, Ferri was often 'motionless as a statue'.
