= Salomon Idler =

German shoemaker and inventor

Salomon Idler (11 February 1610 in Cannstatt – probably 1669 in Augsburg) was a German shoemaker, who is best known for his attempt to become an aviation pioneer.

== Biography ==
Idler was a shoemaker in Augsburg, who also had several other interests. He was also known as a poet and actor. He was married two times.

Idler dreamed of flying, and constructed a set of wings that he would ride while hanging suspended from his arms. He made one attempt at flying, originally planning on launching himself from the Perlachturm, a 70-meter tower in the center of Augsburg, but the clergyman was able to convince him to start at a lower level. In the attempt, he was unable to control his descent, and fell onto a bridge. He survived, but four chickens under the bridge were killed when it collapsed.

After his abortive attempt, Idler became known as "der fliegende Schuster" (the flying Shoemaker). A street near the University of Augsburg is named after him.

Idler's attempt is fictionalized in the novel Der Teufelsvogel Des Solomon Idler (Solomon Idler's Satanic Bird) by Peter Dempf (ISBN 3821803886, 2000).
