= María de Echachute =

Victim of the Basque witch trials (died 1610)

María de Echachute (died 1 November 1610 in Logroño) was one of the victims of the Basque witch trials, and one of six people executed by over hundreds of accused.

She was from Ezpeleta (Lapurdi) in Navarre. She was arrested by the inquisitor Valle Alvarado in 1609. She was accused of having attended the famous Witches Sabbath in Zugarramurdi. She was brought to Logroño and investigated for witchcraft by the Spanish Inquisition.

She repeatedly denied the accusations against her and refused to confess. The goal of the Inquisition was not to execute people but to make them confess, regret and denounce their actions, after which they were normally pardoned. This procedure was however not possible when the accused refused to confess guilty, and this refusal was the reason to why she sentenced to death. She, and five other of the accused who refused to confess guilty, were all sentenced to be burned alive at the stake for witchcraft: Domingo de Subildegui, María de Echachute, Graciana Xarra, Maria Baztan de Borda, Maria de Arburu and Petri de Joangorena.

On 1 November 1610, she was one of the six people of the accused from the Basque witch trials to be burned alive at the stake in Logrono; all of them were from Zugurramurdi, and had refused to confess guilty. They were burned with the remains of five others who had died in prison before the execution.
