= Ziordia =

Municipality of Spain

Coordinates: 42.867°N 2.233°W

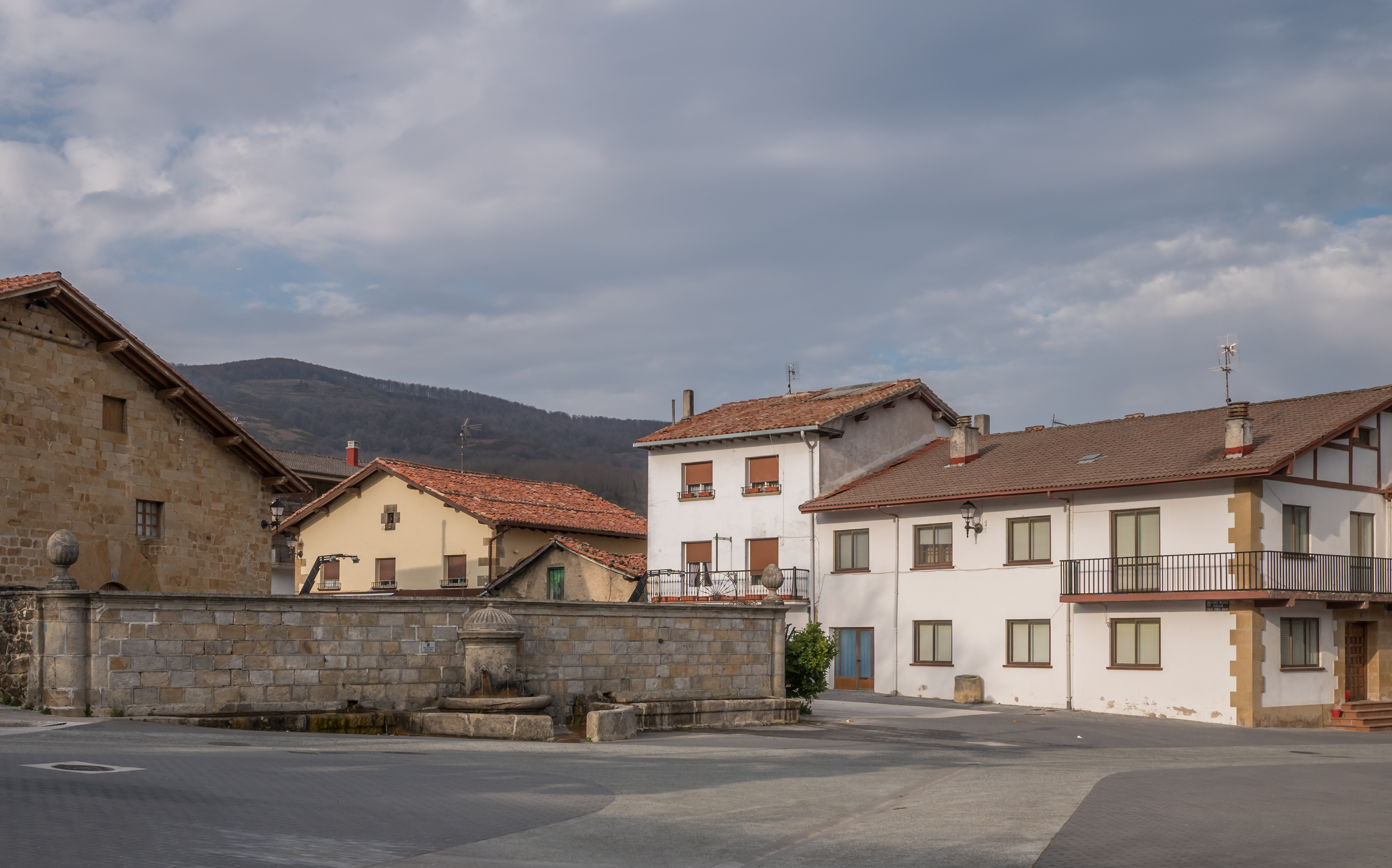
Fountain in Ziordia. Navarre, Spain

Ziordia is a town and municipality located in the province and autonomous community of Navarre, northern Spain.
