= Maria Baztan de Borda =

Spanish alleged witch

Maria Baztan de Borda (died in Logrono, Spain, 1 November 1610) was a Spanish alleged witch. She was one of the people charged with sorcery in the Basque witch trials (1609-1614), and one of only six of 7.000 accused to be executed.

She was the widow of the farmer Martin de Arburu.

She was arrested by the inquisitor Valle Alvarado in 1609. She was charged with witchcraft and participation in the witches' sabbath in Zugarramurdi. She was investigated by the Spanish Inquisition in Logroño.

Of about 7.000 people accused in the Basque witch trials, only six were ultimately executed: Domingo de Subildegui, María de Echachute, Graciana Xarra, Maria Baztan de Borda, Maria de Arburu and Petri de Joangorena. They were condemned to be executed by the Inquisition because they had repeatedly refused to confess, regret and ask for mercy, despite having been accused for a number of sorcery acts by several different people.

She and five others were burned alive at the stake on an autodafé in Logrono 1 November 1610, alongside the effigies of five other condemned people, who had died in prison prior to the execution.
