= Basque witch trials =

17th-century process by the Spanish Inquisition against thousands of alleged witches

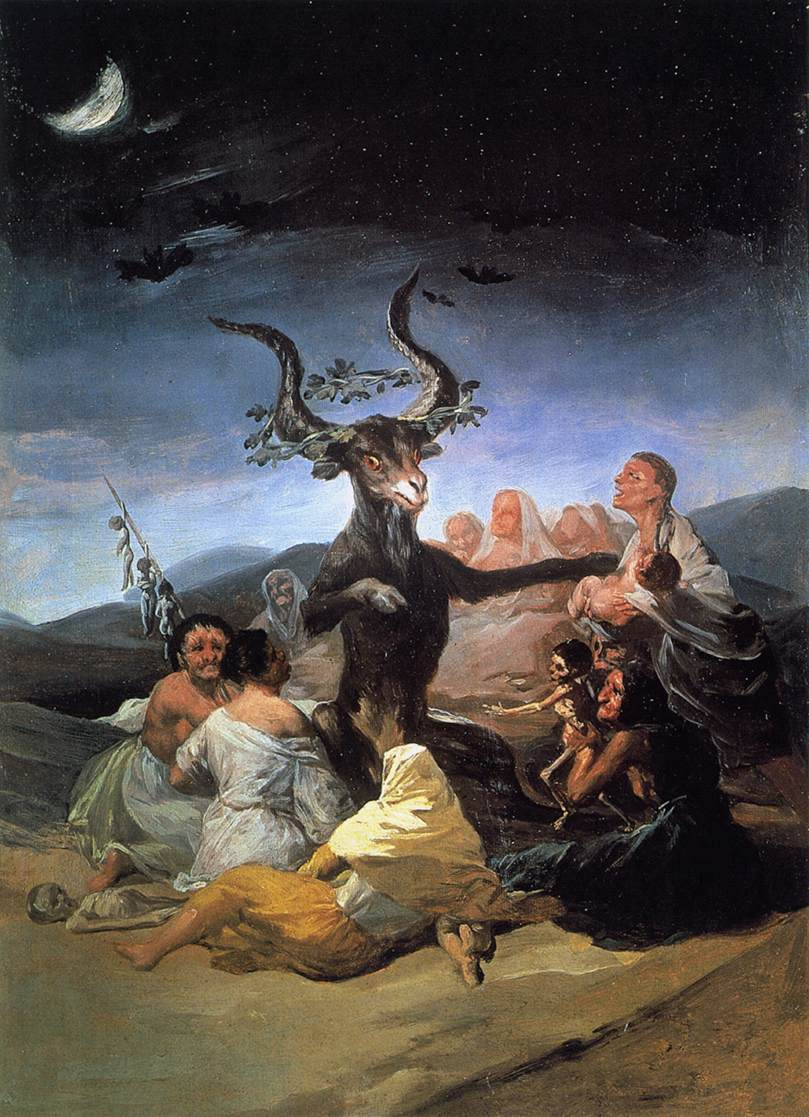
Francisco de Goya's Witches Sabbath, 1798

The Basque Witch Trials of the seventeenth century represent the last attempt at rooting out supposed witchcraft from the Basque Country by the Spanish Inquisition, after a series of episodes erupted during the sixteenth century following the end of military operations in the conquest of Iberian Navarre, until 1524.

The trial of the Basque witches began in January 1609 at Logroño, near Basque territory. It was influenced by similar persecutions conducted by Pierre de Lancre in the bordering Labourd, French Basque Country. Although the number of people executed was small in comparison to other persecutions in Europe, it is considered the biggest single event of its kind in terms of the number of people investigated: by the end of the phenomenon, some 7,000 cases had been examined by the Inquisition.

== Process ==
Logroño, though not a Basque city, was the setting for an Inquisition tribunal responsible for the Kingdom of Navarre, and for the provinces of Alava, Gipuzkoa, Biscay, La Rioja and the North of Burgos and Soria. As was typical of "witch trials", those accused of witchcraft were predominantly women, however this tribunal also targeted children and men, including priests allegedly guilty of healing with nóminas, which are amulets bearing the names of saints.

The first phase ended in 1610, with a declaration of auto-da-fé against thirty-one of the accused, five or six of whom were burned to death including Maria de Arburu. Five people were included in the declaration symbolically, as they had died before the auto-da-fé.

Thereafter proceedings were suspended until the inquisitors had a chance to gather further evidence on what they believed to be a widespread witch cult in the Basque region. Alonso de Salazar Frías, the junior inquisitor and lawyer in training, was designated to examine the matter at length. Armed with an Edict of Grace, promising pardon to all those who voluntarily reported themselves and denounced their accomplices, he traveled across the countryside during the year 1611. He visited mainly the vicinity of Zugarramurdi, near what is now the French-Spanish border, where a cave and a water stream (Olabidea or Infernuko erreka, Basque for "Hell's stream") was said to be the meeting place of the witches.

As was usual in cases of this kind, denunciations flowed in. Frías finally returned to Logroño with "confessions" from nearly 2,000 people, 1,384 of whom were children between the ages of seven and fourteen, implicating a further 5,000 named individuals. Most of 1,802 people retracted their statements before Frías, attributing their confessions to torture. The evidence gathered covered 11,000 pages in all. Only six people out of 1,802 maintained their confessions and claimed to have returned to sabbaths.

Of about 7,000 people accused in the Basque witch trials, only six were ultimately executed: Domingo de Subildegui, María de Echachute, Graciana Xarra, Maria Baztan de Borda, Maria de Arburu and Petri de Joangorena. They were condemned to be executed by the Inquisition because they had repeatedly refused to confess, regret and ask for mercy, despite having been accused for a number of sorcery acts by several different people, and burned at the stake, alongside the effigies of five more who had died in prison prior to execution, in Logrono 1 November 1610.

In the stir of the events, proceedings were started in Hondarribia in 1611, some 35 km away from Zugarramurdi and 19 km from St-Jean-de-Luz, main hotspots of witchcraft allegations against presumed female witches accused of casting spells on living creatures and meeting in Jaizkibel in akelarres, led by a he-goat shaped Devil, known in Basque Mythology as Akerbeltz. Men in this Bidasoa region were recruited in droves for Basque whaling, leaving women on their own (sometimes along with the priests, children, and elders) for long periods. According to evidence given by a witness as attested in the record, "the Devil summoned in the Gascon language those from San Sebastián and Pasaia, and in Basque those from Irun and Hendaye, addressing a few words to them."

== Skepticism ==
Belief in witches was comparatively low in Spain. Although it was never strong, it became weaker under the Visigothic law, established by the Visigoths during their last century of rule in Spain and preserved by the Christian nations during most of the Middle Ages. According to this law, belief in supernatural phenomena of any sort such as witches, fortune tellers, and oracles was a crime and a heresy. The belief in witchcraft had survived, though to a lesser degree in the northmost mountain regions of Galicia and the Basque Country.

The Spanish Inquisition persecuted mainly Protestants, Conversos (baptized descendants of Jews and Moors), and those who illegally smuggled forbidden books into Spain. As far back as 1538, the Council of Inquisition had warned judges not to believe all that they read in Malleus Maleficarum, the infamous witch-finding text. In March 1610, Antonio Venegas de Figueroa, the Bishop of Pamplona, sent a letter to the Inquisition in which he claimed that the witch hunt was based "on lies and self-delusion" and that there had been little knowledge of witchcraft in the region before the trials.

Educated Spaniards were typically skeptical of witchcraft and considered it a northern or Protestant superstition. Salazar, the youngest judge in a panel of three, was also skeptical about the ordeal, stating that he had found no substantive proof of witchcraft on his travels, in spite of the numerous confessions. In addition, he questioned the central basis of the trials. Because of the judges' disagreement on how to proceed, the matter was referred to the Inquisitor-General in Madrid. The senior judges, Alonso Becerra y Holquin and Juan del Valle Alvarado, accused their colleague of being "in league with the Devil." Some of Salazar's objections are remarkable:

The real question is: are we to believe that witchcraft occurred in a given situation simply because of what the witches claim? No: it is clear that the witches are not to be believed, and the judges should not pass a sentence on anyone unless the case can be proven with external and objective evidence sufficient to convince everyone who hears it. And who can accept the following: that a person can frequently fly through the air and travel a hundred leagues in an hour; that a woman can get through a space not big enough for a fly; that a person can make himself invisible; that he can be in a river or the open sea and not get wet; or that he can be in bed at the sabbath at the same time;... and that a witch can turn herself into any shape she fancies, be it housefly or raven? Indeed, these claims go beyond all human reason and may even pass the limits permitted by the Devil.

The Inquisitor-General appeared to share the view that confession and accusation on their own were not sufficient evidence of witchcraft. For some time, the central office of the Inquisition had been skeptical of claims of magic and witchcraft and had only sanctioned the earlier burnings with considerable reluctance, resulting only from the reported mood of panic from Logroño. In August 1614, it was ruled that all of the trials pending at Logroño should be dismissed. The determination issued new and more rigorous rules of evidence that brought witch-burning in Spain to an end, long before the practice ended in the Protestant North.

== Discussion ==
The background and circumstances leading to the trials are not obscure. In the wider context of religious persecution and conflict in Europe, the Catholic Church aimed to suppress old customs or belief systems that they perceived could threaten the authority of the church. Witch trials were one of the ways by which they were able to quell old traditions while reasserting their power.

The so-called sabbaths and akelarres may have been meetings out of reach of the official religious and civil authorities. Those who attended the meetings would eat, drink, talk, and dance, sometimes all night long, in the forest or caves, at times consuming mind-altering herbs and ointments.

While academic research into the Basque Witch Trials has traditionally focused on the mechanisms of persecution, in recent years scholars such as Emma Wilby have argued that the presumed witches drew on a range of experiences to inform their accounts of the witches’ sabbath, from folk magic and collective medicine-making to popular expressions of Catholic religious practice such as liturgical misrule and cursing masses. The emphasis on Catholic liturgy in the Zugarramurdi trials is the reason why, along with the trials simultaneously conducted by Pierre de Lancre in the French Basque country, these persecutions produced the most sophisticated descriptions of the Black Mass to emerge anywhere in Europe.

== In popular culture ==
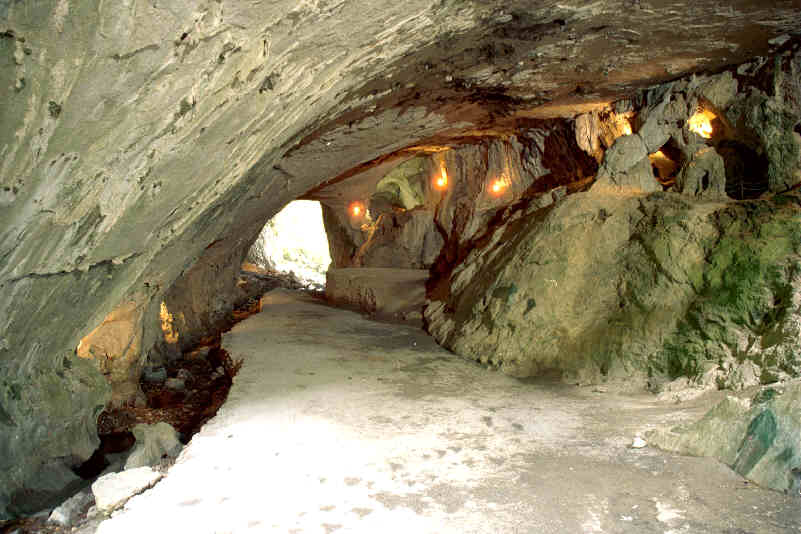
The "Cave of the Witches" near Akelarre in Zugarramurdi.

It was reported that the witches of Zugarramurdi met at the meadow of Akelarre (Basque for "meadow of the he-goat"). In Spanish, aquelarre has become a loan word from the original Basque and refers to black sabbath.

The village of Zugarramurdi is home to a Witchcraft Museum that commemorates the witch trials of the region and pays tribute to the victims.

Akelarre was a 1984 Spanish film by Pedro Olea about the trials.

The Basque witch trials were also featured as a subplot in season 4 of the HBO series True Blood, when the spirit of powerful witch Antonia Gavilán being fed upon, tortured, and condemned to death by vampire priests in the city of Logroño in 1610, takes possession of a modern-day Wiccan in order to exact revenge on vampires.

== See also ==
- Navarre witch trials (1525–26)
- Witching & Bitching
- Akelarre (witchcraft)
- Brujería
- Labourd witch-hunt of 1609
- Maria de Arburu
