= Zugarramurdi =

- Municipality
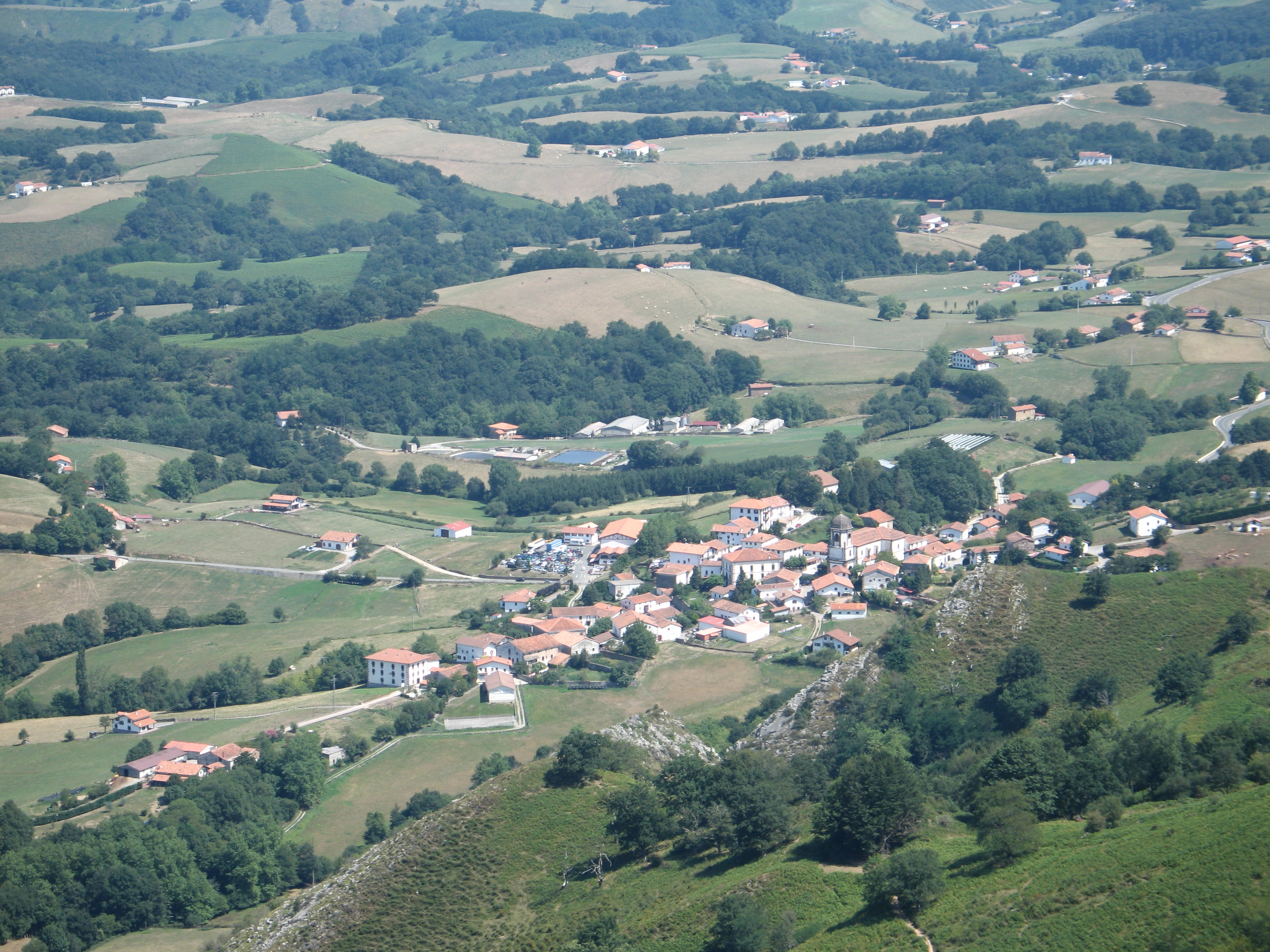
- Zugarramurdi

- Coat of arms

- Location in Spain Zugarramurdi (Spain)
- Coordinates: 43°16′10″N 1°32′30″W
- Country: Spain
- Autonomous community: Navarre
- Province: Navarre
- Comarca: Baztan

Government
  - Mayor: Lázaro Dainciart Iribarren (Akelarre)

Area
  - Total: 5.6 km^{2} (2.2 sq mi)
- Elevation (AMSL): 205 m (673 ft)

Population (2025-01-01)
  - Total: 213
  - Density: 38/km^{2} (99/sq mi)
- Demonym: zugarramurdiarra or zugarramurditarra
- Time zone: UTC+1 (CET)
  - Summer (DST): UTC+2 (CEST (GMT +2))
- Postal code: 31710
- Area code: +34 (Spain) + 948 (Navarre)
- Website: www.zugarramurdi.es

Zugarramurdi is a town and municipality located in the province and autonomous community of Navarre in northern Spain. It passed into history as the setting of alleged occult activity featured in the infamous Basque witch trials held in Logroño in the seventeenth century. The town is home to the Basque witch museum and the Witch Caves. Every year, spectacular fires are lit in the caves near Zugarramurdi for the celebration of the ‘day of the witch’ on the summer solstice.

== Etymology ==
Zugarramurdi is a toponym with unknown meaning, even though it comes from Basque. The philologist Koldo Mitxelena proposed that the etymology of the name could be “place with an abundance of ruined elms”, coming from zugar (elm) + andur (ruined) + the suffix –di (it indicates abundance). However, Mitxelena himself admitted not having proof about this theory. It seems that the name of the village is transcribed in the same way in Basque and Spanish, even though the z is pronounced differently in these languages. Because of this, the pronunciation of Zugarramurdi varies slightly.

== Legend ==
It is said that the word “akelarre” comes from the field next to one of the small Zugarramurdi caves, where the witch meetings used to take place. The Basque word akelarre means “the field of the he-goat”, as well as 'witches sabbath'. Those present in the meetings used to call the caves from this field, because in it, a big black he-goat used to graze (called Akerbeltz in Basque). It is said the he-goat turned into a human when the witches gathered, so it is thought the goat was the devil itself. This is why Zugarramurdi is often called “The Cathedral of the Devil”.

The legend of Zugartamurdi is the basis of the 2013 comedy-horror film, Las brujas de Zugarramurdi (renamed Witching and Bitching for English audiences).

== Gallery ==
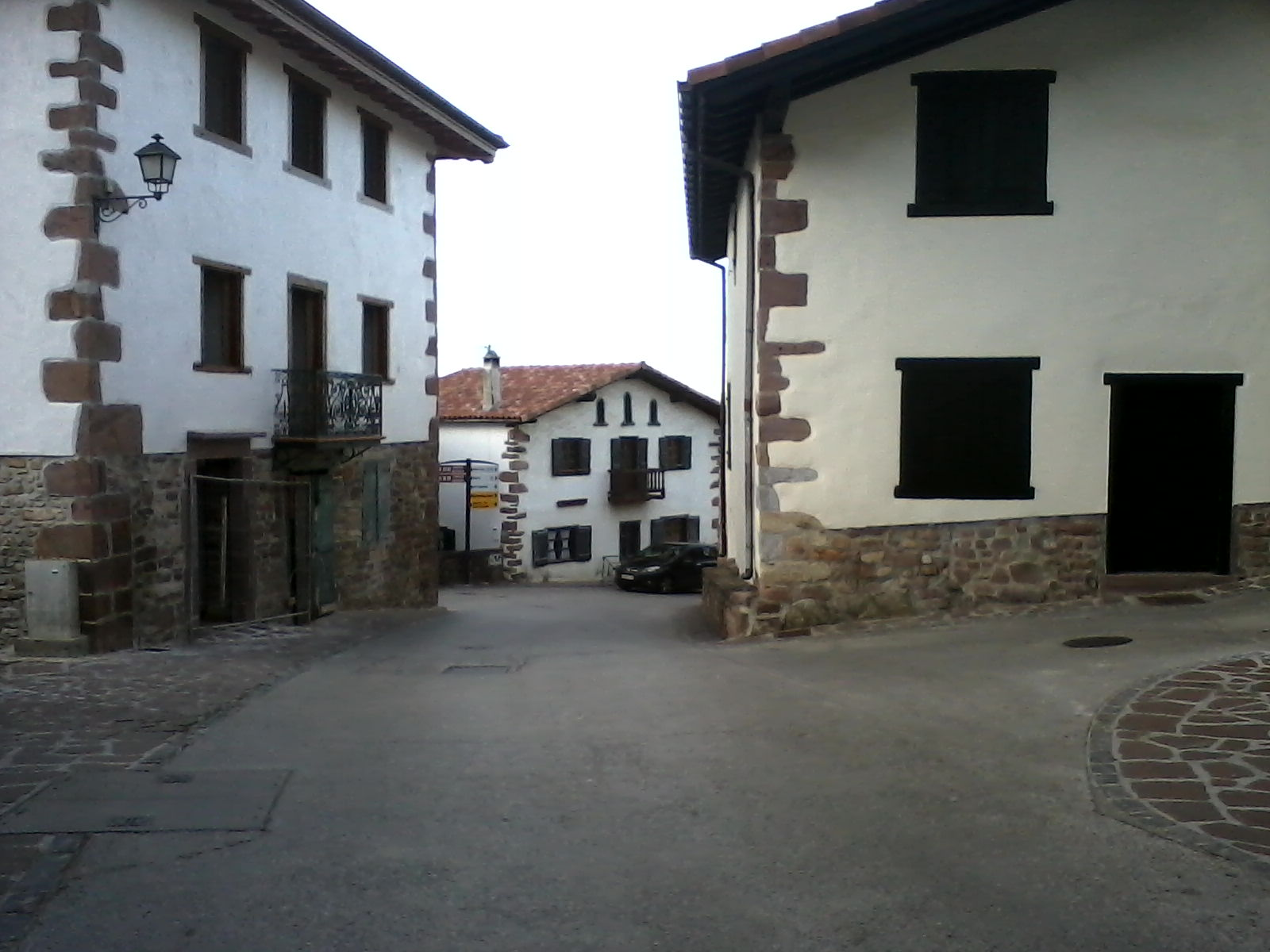
Street of Zugarramurdi

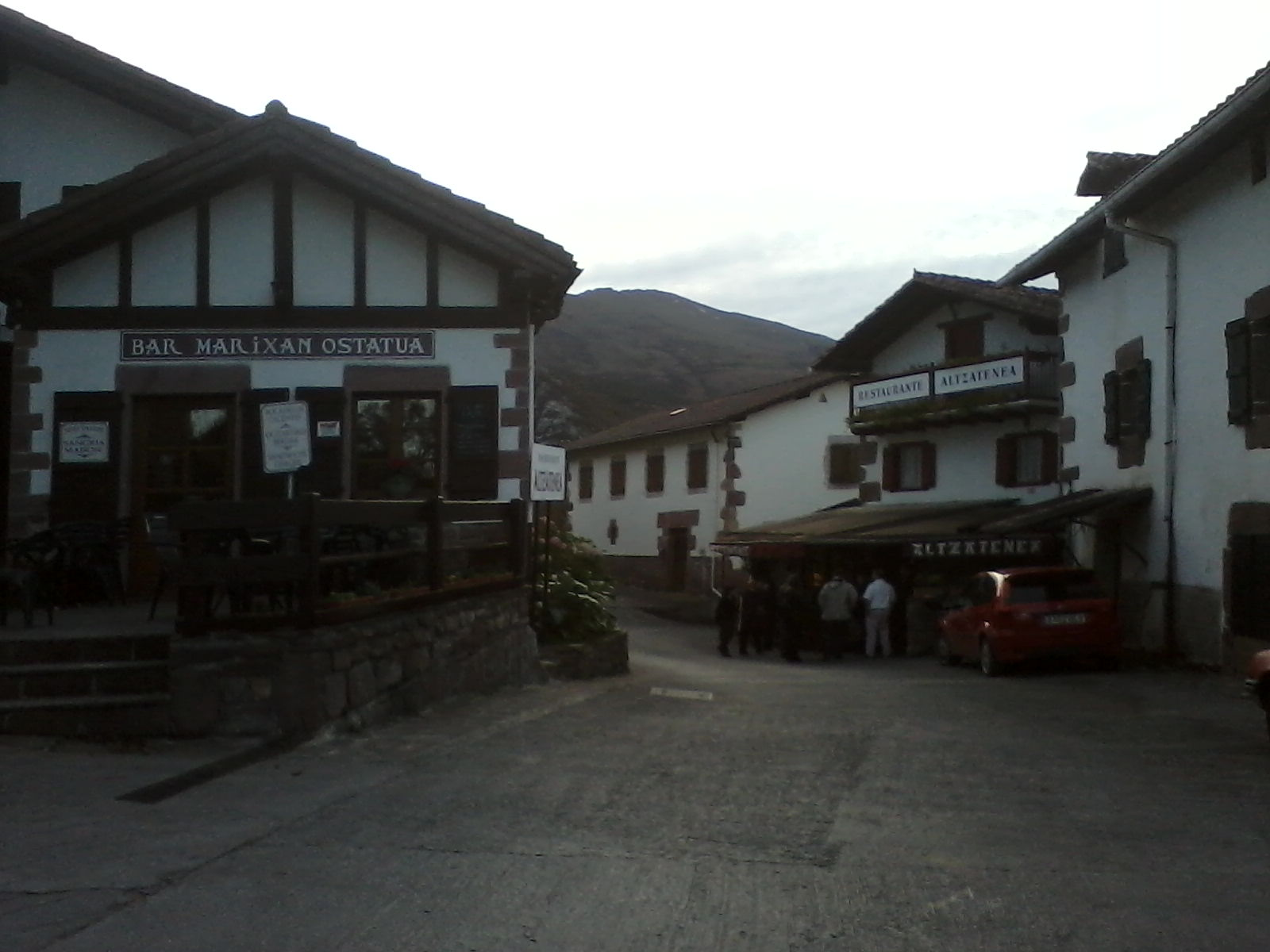
Typical architecture

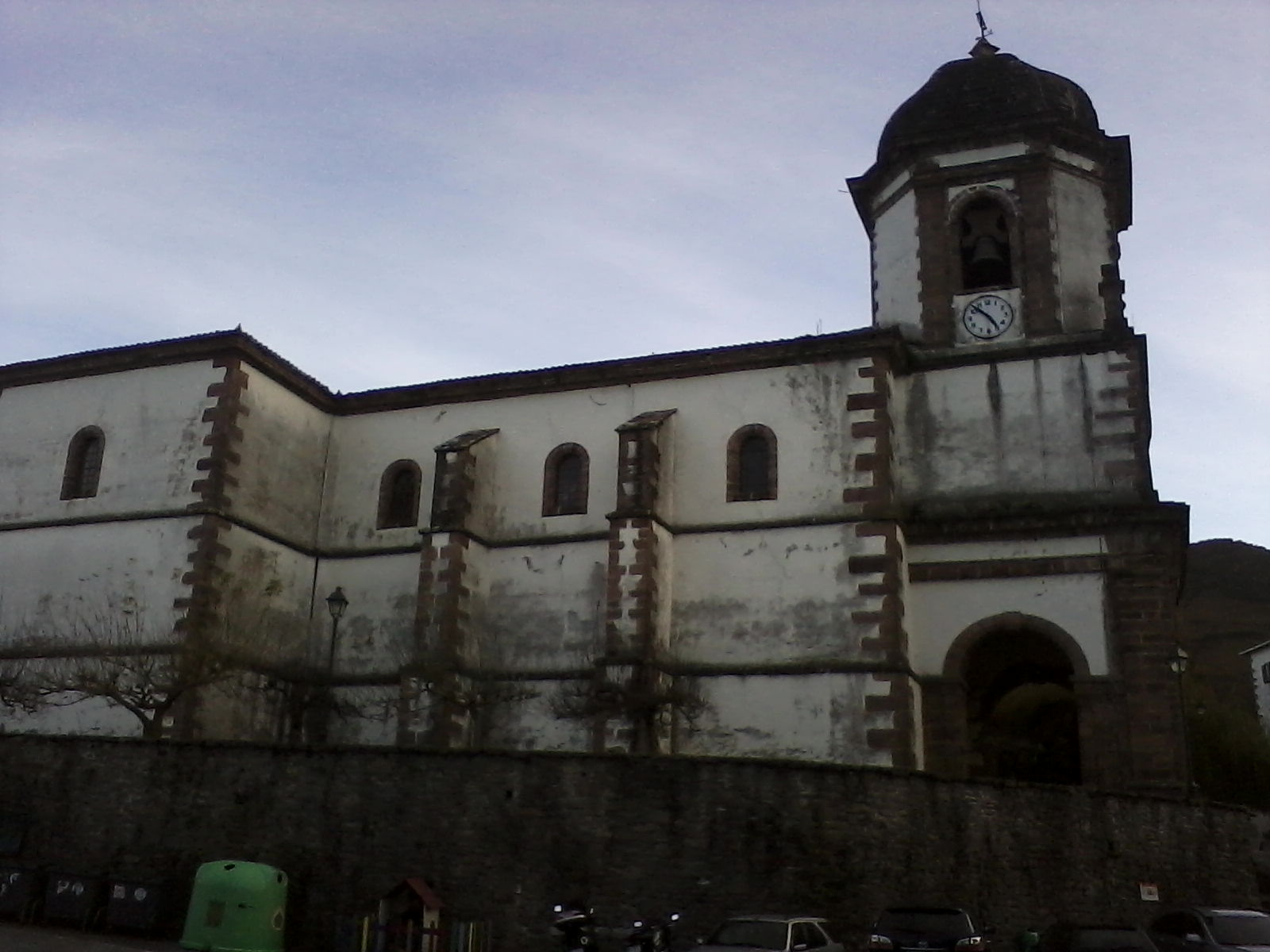
Asunción Church

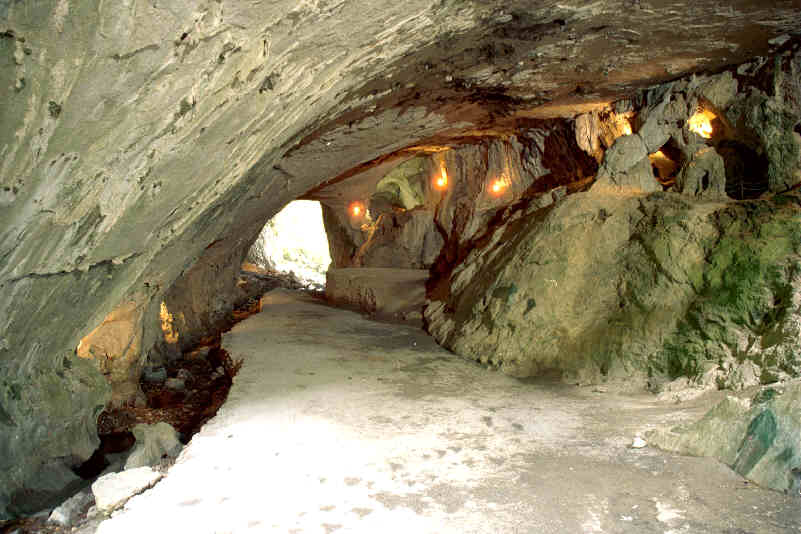
The "Cave of the Witches" near Akelarre in Zugarramurdi
