= Michael van Langren =

Astronomer & cartographer (1598-1675)

Michael van Langren (Note: His name appears in a variety of forms. It is attested as Michael Floreet van Langren; Michael Florent, Michiel Florent, Michel Florent, or Michel-Florent van Langren; Michael Florencio van Langren; Michel or Michiel Florentius van Langren; Michael or Miguel Florencio van Langren; Michael Flor. van Langren; Mich. Fl. Langren; and M.F. a Langren.) (April 1598 – May 1675) was an astronomer and cartographer of the Low Countries. A Catholic, he chiefly found employment in service to the Spanish Monarchy.

== Family ==
Michael van Langren was the youngest member of a family of Dutch cartographers. He was baptized on 27 April 1598 in Amsterdam.

His grandfather, Jacob van Langren, was born in Gelderland but moved to the Southern Netherlands and later to Amsterdam, where his sons Arnold and Hendrik were born. Unusually, each member of the family retained variations of Jacob's patronym Floresz rather than separate patronyms of their own. Jacob and his sons produced globes from 1580, both terrestrial and celestial. A 1586 pair survives, the celestial globe based on astronomical data provided by Rudolf Snellius father of Willebrord Snellius, while Petrus Plancius collaborated on the 1589 edition. In 1592, the States General granted the Van Langren family a monopoly in the production of globes, which led to quarrels with Jodocus Hondius.

Arnold and Hendrik produced maps as well. Their world maps of the mid 1590s usually were drawn after maps by Plancius or Ortelius, but sometimes contained novelties based on recent discoveries such as depicting Nova Zembla as an island or Korea as a peninsula.

Arnold moved with his family, which included his sons Jacob and Michael, from Amsterdam to Antwerp around the year 1609, during the truce between the Spanish crown and the States General. From the Spanish administration he got the title of Sphérographe de leurs Altesses and was awarded a grant of 300 livres towards the expense of his move.

Michael van Langren did not receive a university education. He became a cartographer and engineer. He would serve as the Royal Cosmographer and Mathematician to King Philip IV of Spain, and was helped in his work by the patronage of Isabella Clara Eugenia. He died in May 1675 in Brussels.

== Contributions ==
Among his contributions were attempts to determine longitude.

Determining longitude at sea was one of the major scientific problems of the seventeenth century, and Van Langren devoted much of his work to finding a practical solution. As early as 1621 he proposed that longitude could be calculated by observing the Moon, particularly by tracking how the illumination of lunar mountains and craters changed during the lunar cycle.

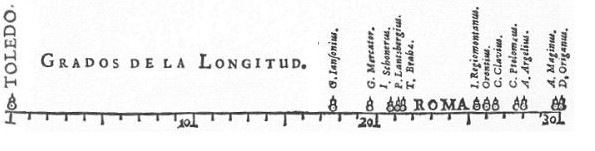
A graph of statistical data, showing the wide range of estimates of the distance in longitude between Toledo and Rome.

To show the magnitude of the problem, he created the first (known) graph of statistical data, showing the wide range of estimates of the distance in longitude between Toledo and Rome.

He believed he could improve the accuracy of longitude determination, particularly at sea, by observing peaks and craters of the Moon as they appear and disappear, not only during eclipses of the Moon but also in the course of the entire lunation.

His proposed method required accurate observations and detailed mapping of the lunar surface, which led him to undertake systematic studies of the Moon.

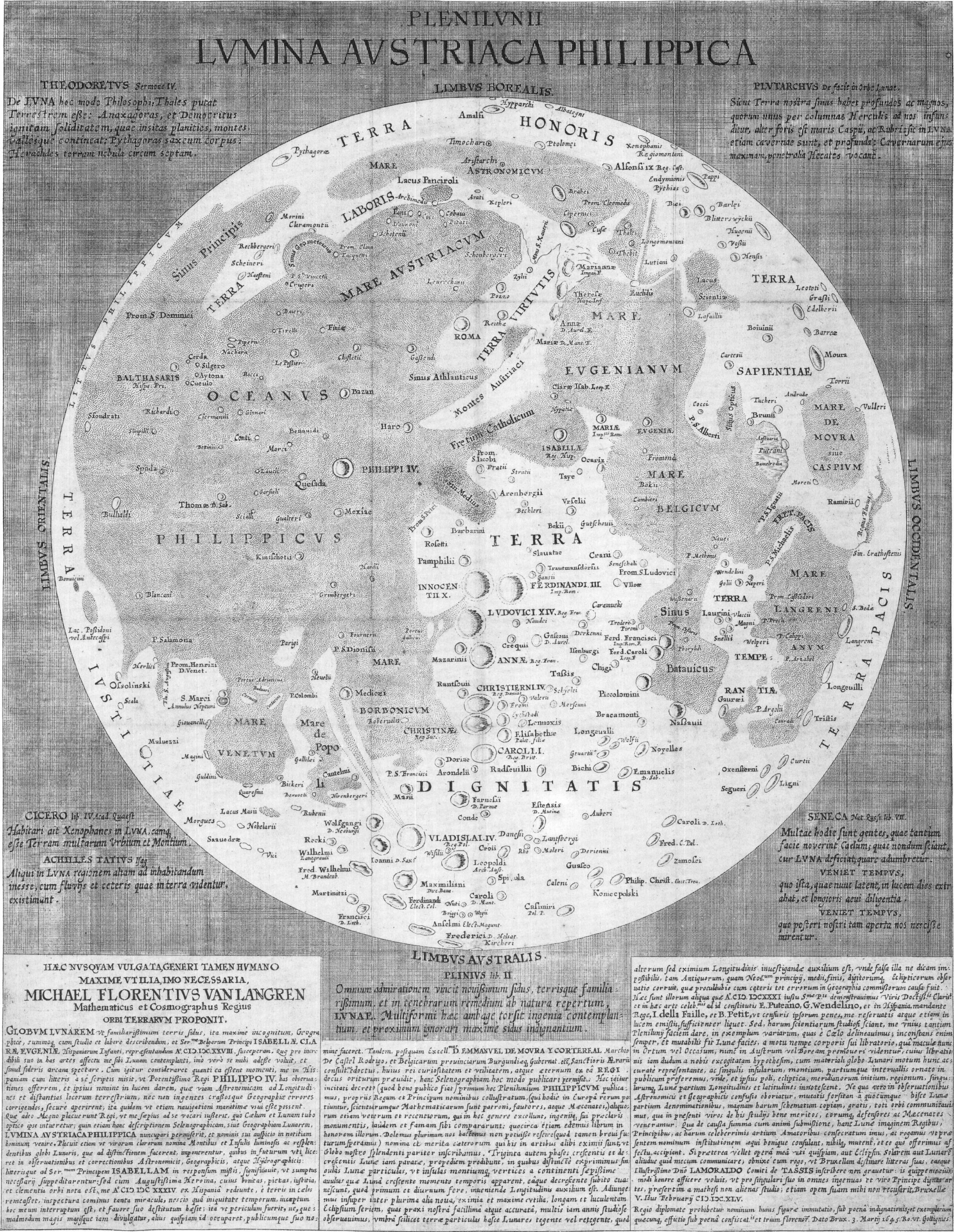
Langren's map (1645)

This led him to make a map of the Moon (published in 1645), and he planned to produce maps of the Moon at thirty different phases, but never realized this plan. He was the first to assign names to various lunar features, but few of these names were widely accepted because they mostly corresponded to Catholic monarchs, scientists, and artists.

Van Langren actively promoted his ideas to the Spanish court. In 1625 he presented his longitude method at Dunkirk to the Archduchess Isabella Clara Eugenia, and in the following years he travelled to Spain seeking royal support for his work. During this period he produced astronomical and hydrographical tables intended to support his longitude calculations, although these works have not survived. In Madrid he also published Advertencias de Miguel Florencio Van Langren a todos los professores y amadores de la mathemática (c.1634), outlining his approach to the longitude problem.

He also published his observations of the comet of 1652, C/1652 Y1. He made various maps of the Spanish Netherlands. He also produced plans for a port near Dunkirk, improvements to the port of Ostend, efforts to clear the canals of Antwerp, flood control concepts, and fortifications.

He named crater Langrenus on the Moon after himself, and the name has been preserved to this day.
