= Nicolás de Aguilar =

Nicolás de Aguilar y Villagómez

Personal details
- Born: 1627 Yuriripundaro, Michoacán, Mexico
- Died: 1666 (?)
- Spouse: Catalina Márquez Núñez
- Profession: official

Nicolás Pablo Pedro de Aguilar de Villagómez (born 1627; died 1666?) a criollo, was a Spanish official in New Mexico. He defended the Pueblo Indians who wanted to continue their earlier religious practices even after they ostensibly converted to Christianity, clashed with the Franciscan missionaries, and was tried and found guilty of heresy by the Mexican Inquisition. As a result of this conviction, his public career ended and he was banished from New Mexico.

== Early life ==
Nicolás de Aguilar was born in Yuririapundaro, in the Mexican state of Guanajuato. His grandparents were Spanish conquistadors of the province. His parents, Pedro Pablo de Aguilar and Isabel Juana de Villagómez Pérez, were well-off. At 18, Aguilar left home to live near the northern city of Parral, Chihuahua, where he worked as a miner and soldier.

Aguilar quickly demonstrated stubborn courage. Claim jumpers attempted to intimidate the 18-year-old miner by pulling down a support pillar and caving in his mine tunnel. He appealed to local legal authorities, brought charges against four men and won his case. Years later in 1654 he was involved in a shooting incident. Aguilar was charged with kidnapping three women and taking them to a hideout in the mountains. A 16-man posse was organized to rescue the women. Surrounded, Aguilar shot and killed a member of the posse, the father of one of the women he had allegedly abducted. He then escaped by horseback and was seen no more in Parral. Aguilar is next heard of in New Mexico where he served as a soldier, becoming a sergeant, an adjutant, and as an inspector of trade caravans between New Mexico and El Paso. He married Catalina Márquez Núñez and the couple had four children, Gerónima, María, Isabela, and Nicolás. When newly appointed governor Bernardo López de Mendizábal arrived in New Mexico in 1659 he appointed Aguilar Magistrate (Alcalde Mayor), the chief civil official, of the region of Las Salinas. Las Salinas consisted of several Tompiro Indian Pueblos on the eastern border of the New Mexico colony. The ruins of these Pueblos are today preserved in the Salinas Pueblo Missions National Monument. The Salinas Pueblos were exposed to Apache raids, but earned a precarious livelihood by trading salt and agricultural products for buffalo meat and skins.

== Aguilar and the Franciscans ==
In the New Mexico colony, the Franciscan missionaries had set up a theocracy among the Pueblo Indians. Several Franciscan missionaries lived among the Salinas Pueblos. During Governor López’s inspection of Las Salinas in October 1659, he detected several abuses of Indians by the Franciscans. He established the policy that Aguilar was to use his powers to enforce civil law and not permit the Franciscans to punish religious infractions by Indians. Aguilar carried out this policy so enthusiastically that the Franciscans were soon calling him “Attila.”

The Franciscans often demanded that the Indians work for them without pay. Aguilar enforced a prohibition against Indians working for the Franciscans without pay, including as members of the choir in the churches or as volunteers. Moreover, he decreed that Indians were not to be flogged or punished in any way for offenses against the church. On one Sunday Aguilar and a priest clashed during a church service and Aguilar ordered all the Indians to leave. On another occasion Aguilar ordered Indians not to gather firewood for the friars. His rationale was that it was dangerous for the Indians to go into the mountains for firewood given the proximity of Apache Indians. On a third occasion he had an Indian Church official whipped for disciplining two Indian girls accused of being concubines. The issue, however, that truly infuriated the missionaries was Governor López’s permission to the Pueblos to practice their traditional dances and ceremonies, believed by the Franciscans to be idolatrous. This was a direct swipe at the authority of the Church. Aguilar further inflamed the situation by ordering Christian Indians to participate in the dances. López charged that the Franciscans were not observing their vows of poverty and chastity.

The Franciscans duly noted all the offenses against them by López, Aguilar, and other officials. In 1660, the Franciscans publicly excommunicated Aguilar. He turned his back on the clerical judge and said he did "not care for all the excommunications in the world." The judge resigned "saying he did not wish to proceed with people who had no fear of God or censures."

In May 1662, the Franciscans had Aguilar and Governor and Mrs. López arrested and turned over to Inquisition authorities. The men were chained and sent to Mexico City for trial. Aguilar was accused of simple heresy; the governor and his wife were charged with the more serious crime of “Judaic practices.”

== Trial before the Inquisition ==
Nicolás de Aguilar was not intimidated by the much feared Inquisition officials. He was described as a 36-year-old man of “large body, coarse, and somewhat brown.” He dressed in crudely woven and well-worn flannel trousers and a wool shirt. His total worldly belongings fit into a small box containing an extra set of clothing, several religious books, and a few good luck charms and medicinal herbs. He was charged with “obstructing the missionary program, inciting hostility toward the Franciscan friars and disrespect for the church and its teachings, undermining mission discipline, and encouraging native Kachina dances.” Aguilar gave a spirited defense of himself, denying all charges. His trial lasted 19 months and he was found guilty on all charges. He was sentenced to undergo an auto de fe and banned from residing in New Mexico for ten years and holding government office for life. One of the four judges dissented from the ruling and the punishment was lenient considering the charges. Governor López died during his trial.

== Legacy ==
Aguilar is described by most historians in terms such as an “unscrupulous lackey” with a “devilish fury.” Recent scholars, however, have shown a grudging admiration for his brave and uncompromising stand against the Franciscans. As a mestizo, ranking low on the social ladder of Spanish society, he may have had a sincere sympathy with the plight of the Indians and resentment of the rule over them by the Catholic priests. His forthright defense of himself before the Inquisition can be admired as most defendants were reduced to pitiful pleading of their case.

The defeat of Aguilar and Governor López by the Franciscans probably was the last opportunity of the Spanish regime in New Mexico to reduce the animosity of the Indians under its control. Spanish officials after them knew not to run afoul of the Fransciscan priests. In 1680 the Pueblos revolted, expelled the Spanish, and with special animosity slaughtered most of the priests in New Mexico. The Salinas Pueblos had been abandoned in the 1670s as a result of Apache raids, famine, and drought.

Nothing is known of the life of Aguilar after the conclusion of his trial. His wife and children apparently remained in New Mexico and the children took her last name of Marquez.
