= Mexican Inquisition =

Extension of the Spanish Inquisition in New Spain

Tribunal of the Holy Office of the Inquisition in New Spain

History
- Established: 4 November 1571
- Disbanded: 10 June 1820

Leadership
- First Inquisitor: Pedro Moya de Contreras
- Last Inquisitor: Manuel de Flores

Meeting place
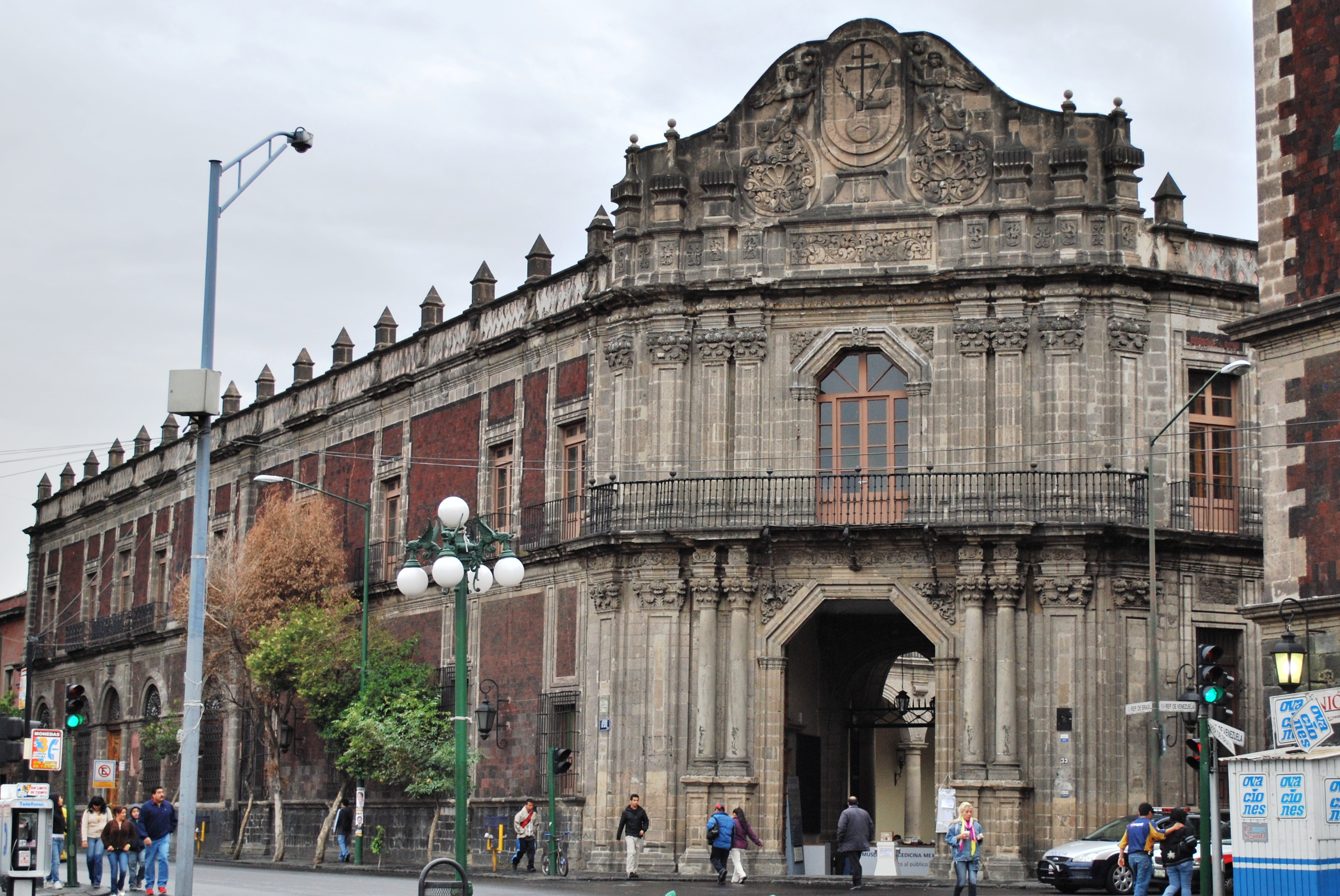
- Palace of the Inquisition, Mexico City

Footnotes
- See also: Spanish Inquisition; Peruvian Inquisition

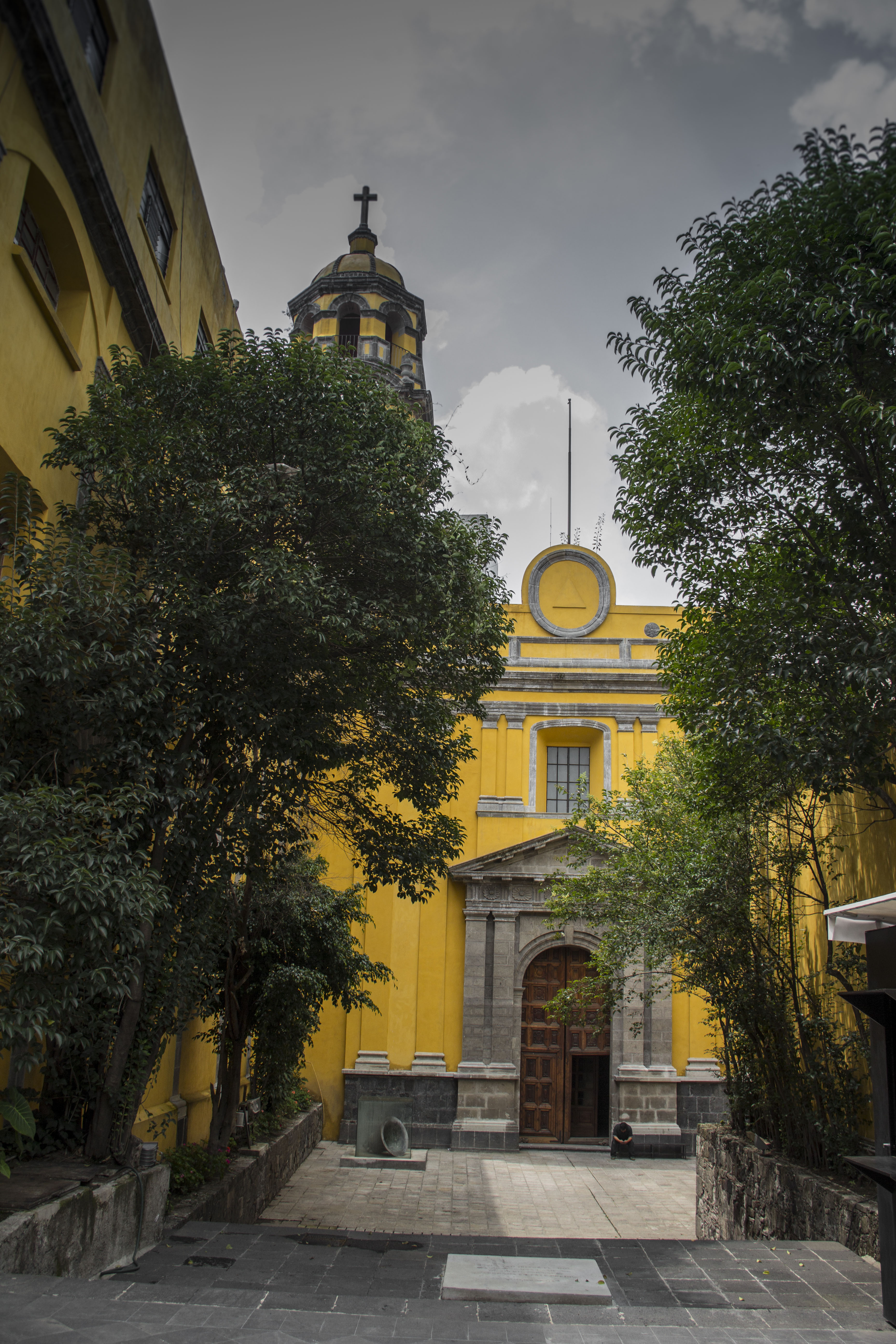
Convent of San Diego which contains a plaque in memory of Inquisition victims that were burned alive here.

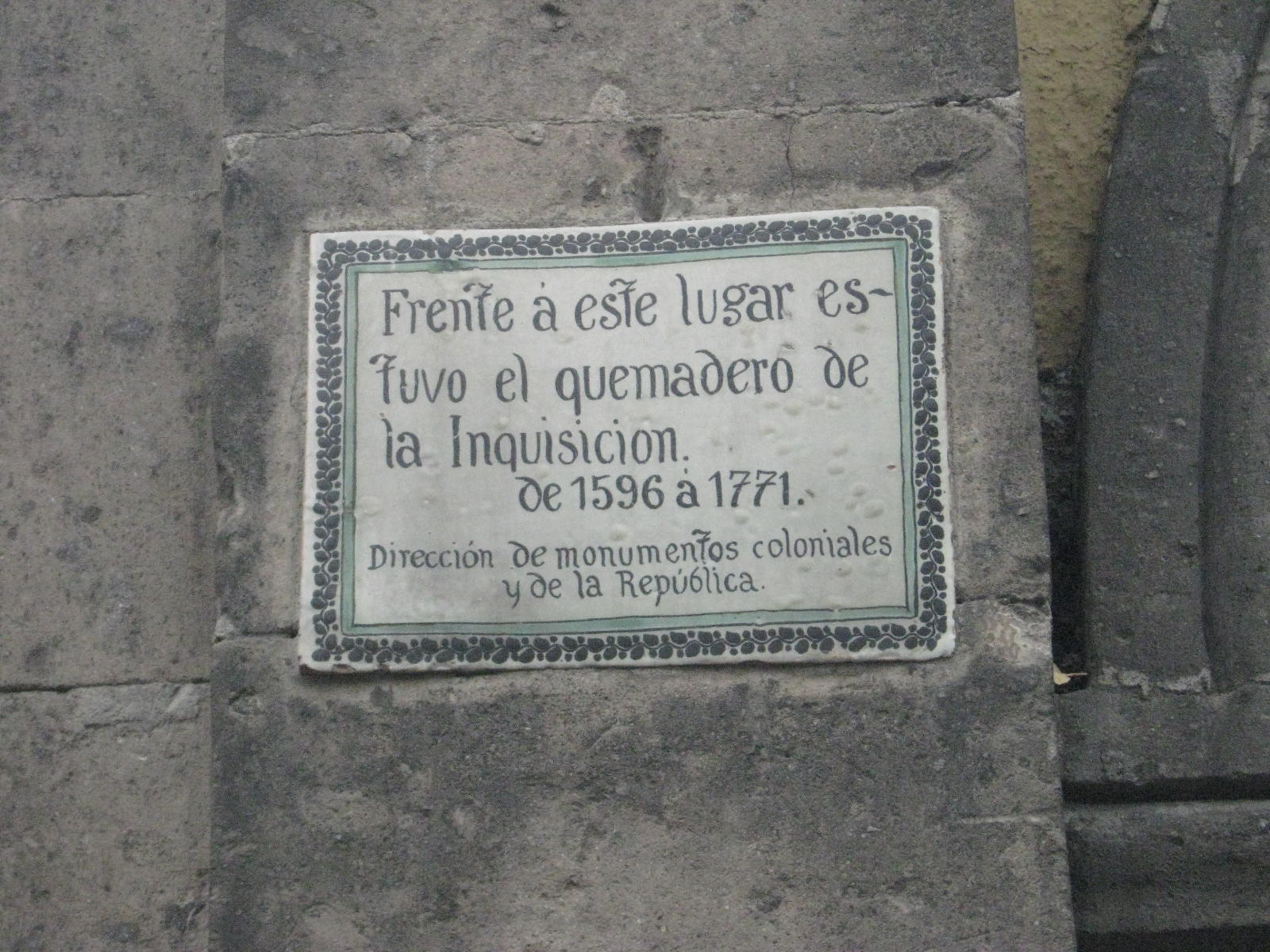
The plaque reads "In front of this place was the quemadero (burning place) of the Inquisition. 1596–1771"

The Mexican Inquisition was an extension of the Spanish Inquisition into New Spain. The Spanish conquest of the Aztec Empire was not only a political event for the Spanish, but a religious event as well. In the early 16th century, the Reformation, the Counter-Reformation, and the Inquisition were in full force in most of Europe. The Catholic Monarchs of Castile and Aragon had just conquered the last Muslim stronghold in the Iberian Peninsula, the kingdom of Granada, giving them special status within the Catholic realm, including great liberties in the conversion of the native peoples of Mesoamerica. When the Inquisition was brought to the New World, it was employed for many of the same reasons and against the same social groups as suffered in Europe itself, minus the Indigenous to a large extent. Almost all of the events associated with the official establishment of the Palace of the Inquisition occurred in Mexico City, where the Holy Office had its own major building (which is now the Museum of Medicine of UNAM on República de Brasil street). The official period of the Inquisition lasted from 1571 to 1820, with an unknown number of individuals prosecuted.

Although records are incomplete, one historian estimates that about 50 people were executed by the Mexican Inquisition. Included in that total are 29 people executed as "Judaizers" between 1571 and 1700 (out of 324 people prosecuted) for practicing Judaism.

== Spanish Catholicism ==
The Mexican Inquisition was an extension of the events that were occurring in Spain and the rest of Europe for some time. Spanish Catholicism had been reformed under the reign of Isabella I of Castile (1479– 1504), which reaffirmed medieval doctrines and tightened discipline and practice. She also introduced the Holy Office of the Inquisition in 1478 with the permission of Pope Sixtus IV, combining secular and religious authority. Much of the zeal to reaffirm traditional Catholic tenets came from the history of the Reconquista. Those who overthrew Muslim domination of the peninsula were very committed to the goal of making Catholicism completely dominant wherever they could. After the discovery and conquest of the New World, the effort to spread the faith included the belief that non-Christians would benefit from instruction in the "true faith."

== Introduction of Christianity to New Spain ==
The Spanish crown had total domination of political and religious matters in New Spain. Pope Alexander VI in 1493 and later Pope Julius II in 1508 gave the crown extensive authority over New Spain, with the goal of converting the Indigenous peoples to Catholicism. Spanish officials appointed religious authorities in Mexico and even had the authority to reject papal bulls there. The evangelization process and later Inquisition had political motivations. The objective of Christian conversion was to strengthen alternative sources of legitimacy to the traditional authority of the tlatoani, or chief of the basic political unit of the city-state.

Franciscan friars began the work of evangelization in the mid-1520s and continued under the first Bishop of Mexico, Fray Juan de Zumárraga in the 1530s. Many of the Franciscan evangelists learned the native languages and even recorded much of native culture, providing a great deal of our current knowledge of life in Mesoamerica. The Dominicans arrived in 1525. They were seen as both intellectuals and agents of the Inquisition, paralleling their role in Spain. These two orders, along with the Augustinians, provided most of the evangelization effort in Mexico. By 1560, the three orders had more than 800 clergy at work in New Spain. The Jesuits arrived in 1572. The number of Catholic clergy grew to 1,500 by 1580 and then to 3,000 by 1650. In the early years, the clergy's attention would be focused on the conversion of the Indigenous peoples. In the latter years, however, struggles between religious orders as well as segments of European society emerged and took precedence over conversion activities.

A series of three ecclesiastical councils met during the course of the 16th century to give shape to the newly established Church in New Spain. In 1565, the Second Mexican Ecclesiastical Council met to discuss how to implement the decisions of the Council of Trent (1546–1563). The Catholicism being imposed here was heavily influenced by the Counter-Reformation and required total assent from its believers. Its main thrust was not on individual belief or conscience but on collective observance of clerically ordained precepts and practices. This combination of authoritarianism and collectivism was extended to the Indies during the course of the 16th century.

This sense of collectivism allowed for a certain amount of laxity in the conversion of the Native American population as many outward practices were indeed similar to Catholic practices. Both systems intertwined religious and secular authority, practiced a type of baptism with subsequent renaming of the child and the practice of communion had parallels with eating replicas of Aztec divinities with blood. Franciscan and Dominican studies of Native American culture and language led to a certain amount of appreciation for it. It was definitely different from the Islam that the Reconquista had subdued, toward which so much Christian hatred was directed. Instead, the indigenous religion was branded as paganism, but was regarded as an authentic religious experience that had been corrupted by demonic influences. Much of appreciation of the indigenous religion was helped by the fact that many parallels could be drawn between the gods and the cults of the saints as well as the Virgin Mary. For this reason, evangelization did not result in a direct onslaught against indigenous beliefs. Rather the evangelizers attempted to shift existing belief into a Christian paradigm. While in theory Christianity was to have absolute supremacy in all things religious, in practice, the Church did not oppose any practices that did not directly conflict with doctrine.

The native population more easily adjusted to aspects of Catholicism that were similar to their previous beliefs, including the notion of the intertwining of religious and secular authority. Many European and indigenous practices continued side-by-side with indigenous beliefs. Indigenous practices were redesigned with Christian names and references. Pre-Hispanic beliefs and practices therefore survived in the new religion and colored the new religion's expression. The most famous example of this may be the emergence of the cult of the Virgin of Guadalupe. Franciscan Fray Bernardino de Sahagún suspected it was a post-Conquest adaptation of the Aztec cult of Tonatzin, a mother goddess. However, the archbishop of Mexico, Fray Alonso de Montúfar, who was a member of the Dominican Order, promoted the cult. There was even some speculation in the early colonial period that the Nahua god Quetzalcoatl was being refashioned as the Apostle Thomas.

However, not all native reactions were docile. There was strong resistance early on in Tlaxcala. The Oaxaca sierra violently resisted until the late 1550s. The Otomi and peoples in parts of Michoacán state as late as the 1580s also resisted.

== Episcopal Inquisition ==
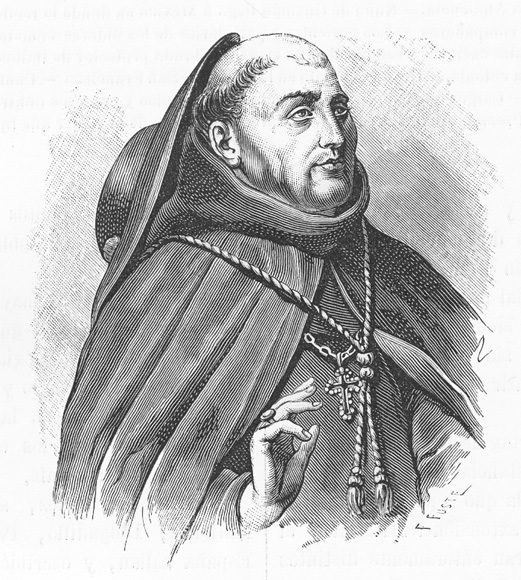
Bishop Juan de Zumárraga, who as bishop exercised inquisitorial powers

At the time of the discovery and conquest of the New World, Cardinal Adrian de Utrecht was the Inquisitor General of Spain. He appointed Pedro de Córdoba as Inquisitor for the West Indies in 1520. He also had inquisitorial powers in Mexico after the conquest, but did not have the official title. When Franciscan Juan de Zumárraga became the first Bishop of Mexico in 1535, he exercised inquisitorial powers as bishop.

One of Bishop Zumárraga's first acts as episcopal inquisitor was the 1536 prosecution of a Nahua man, baptized Martín, with the indigenous name of Ocelotl ("ocelot"). He was prosecuted as a nahualli, a priest with supernatural powers, as well as for heretical dogmatism and concubinage. The trial record of his case was published in 1912, This early case prosecuting a Nahua holy man attracted the attention of scholars.

Another of Bishop Zumárraga's inquisitorial prosecutions was that of Nahua lord of Texcoco, who took the name of Carlos upon baptism. He is known in the historical literature as Don Carlos Ometochtzin. The trial record was published in 1910. It is the main source for this high-profile case. Don Carlos was likely a nephew of Nezahualcoyotl. Zumárraga accused this lord of reverting to worship of the old gods. Following a trial with indigenous witnesses and Don Carlos's own testimony, the Texcocan lord was declared guilty. He was burned at the stake on 30 November 1539. However, the Spanish secular and religious authorities did not consider the prosecution of the case prudent. Zumárraga himself was reprimanded for it.

For a number of reasons persecution of the Indians for religious offenses was not actively pursued. First of all, since many native practices had parallels in Christianity, and since this "paganism" was neither the Judaic or Islamic faiths that Spanish Christians had fought so zealously against, ecclesiastical authorities opted instead to push native practices in Christian directions. Also, many of the friars sent to evangelize the native peoples became protectors of them from the extremely cruel treatment at the hands of secular authorities. The lighter treatment of indigenous peoples contrasted sharply with treatment of European heretics later in the colonial period. However, as a practical matter it was probably not prudent to pursue rigid enforcement of ecclesiastical rules in an environment where native peoples vastly outnumbered their European conquerors, who also needed to rule through indigenous intermediaries.

The above considerations help explain why the Inquisition was not formally established in New Spain until 1571. However, this is not to say that Inquisition-like tactics were never used after the execution of Nahua lord Don Carlos. Antagonism toward the Spanish led to the Maya resistance in the Yucatán in 1546–1547. The failure of this Maya movement prompted more aggressive evangelization, with the Franciscans finding out that despite their efforts many traditional beliefs and practices survived. Under the leadership of Fray Diego de Landa, the Franciscans decided to make an example of indigenous people they considered back-sliders without regard to proper legal formalities. Large numbers of these people were subjected to torture and as many of the Maya's sacred books as could be found were burned.

=== Allegations of witchcraft and assertions of power ===
While there were many allegations against and executions of “crypto-Jews,” a large majority of cases brought to the Inquisition concerned sorcery or magic, and thus blasphemy and collusion with the Devil. Most of these cases were brought against female actors, rather than males, although there were cases of male sorcery brought before Inquisitors.

The Inquisition in peninsular Spain was generally uninterested in and highly skeptical of accusations of witchcraft. In Spanish America, however, Inquisitors were concerned with delegitimizing women who were accused of and confessed to crimes of witchcraft. Some upper class women tried to avoid conviction by "proving" that the supposed magic of which they were accused was in fact a female delusion. While this was a somewhat successful endeavor on the elite level, the prosecution of these women in fact created the environment for lower- and middle-class women to claim outlandish abilities and thus brought them a degree of power within their local communities.

Within ethnically mixed communities, the types of "magic" women of Hispanic America would use with a fair amount of frequency were, to an extent, a folkish variation of Catholicism. Cultural influences on these practices derived from Spanish, indigenous, and African traditions. The use of "day to day magic" was not unusual. The types of magic practiced included "sorcery," which authors such as Laura de Mello e Souza define as needing a pact with the Devil. Other "magical practices" that do not require a pact with the Devil are incredibly vast and based upon race and socioeconomic standing. These types of magic were used by people who were oppressed. Many enslaved people would use magic or expressions of blasphemy as a way to exert power against their masters. It was a way to take back some agency. By using magic, they felt they could create negative consequences for their masters' actions. Enslaved people would often use blasphemous cries as an opportunity to speak with Inquisitors and voice their complaints against their masters.

For women, across class and ethnicity, an aim of magic was frequently to change the balance of power within the marital sphere or create a situation where one might find a husband. Sometimes this was a simple kind of magic meant to make a husband stay "true" to his wife. Other times, the purposes of magic spells included aims of making the man impotent or obedient. Some women used their menstrual blood or water previously used to clean their genitals to "ensorcell" food. This approach played on powerful gender role restrictions regarding a woman's place in the private sphere. The approach also represented a metaphorical penetration of the male by the female as a way to hold power over the husband.

Sometimes the idea of magic or mystical powers didn't play off Christian concepts of the Devil, but rather played off religious ideas of Jesus and God. A woman who could claim a special connection to Christ found herself uniquely able to advance her social and economic position. People in her community could come to her for advice and help. Many men of greater wealth would wish to spend time with such women to gain insights. An example of this is Marina de San Miguel, who was brought before the Mexican Inquisition in 1599. Marina, as a beata (a woman who was beatified), was well known in her neighborhood for experiencing religious raptures and trances in which she communicated with saints and Christ himself. For that reason members of her community, "devoted laymen," and even clergy would come to Marina for advice. While these experiences at first gained her credibility, Marina's preoccupation with material gain, her involvement in a religious group defined as part of alumbradismo, and her sexual exploits eventually made her a target for the Mexican Inquisition.

It should be stated that while many women in lower- or middle-class backgrounds were able to use the concepts of magic and satanic pacts as a way to create a sense of power or authority, some women did in fact experience the opposite effect. When women would use these magic practices, often they would be so moved by the "evil" of their actions they would turn themselves in through confession, coming before Inquisitors crying in such a way they were frequently forgiven for their crimes.

== Colonial Holy Office of the Inquisition ==
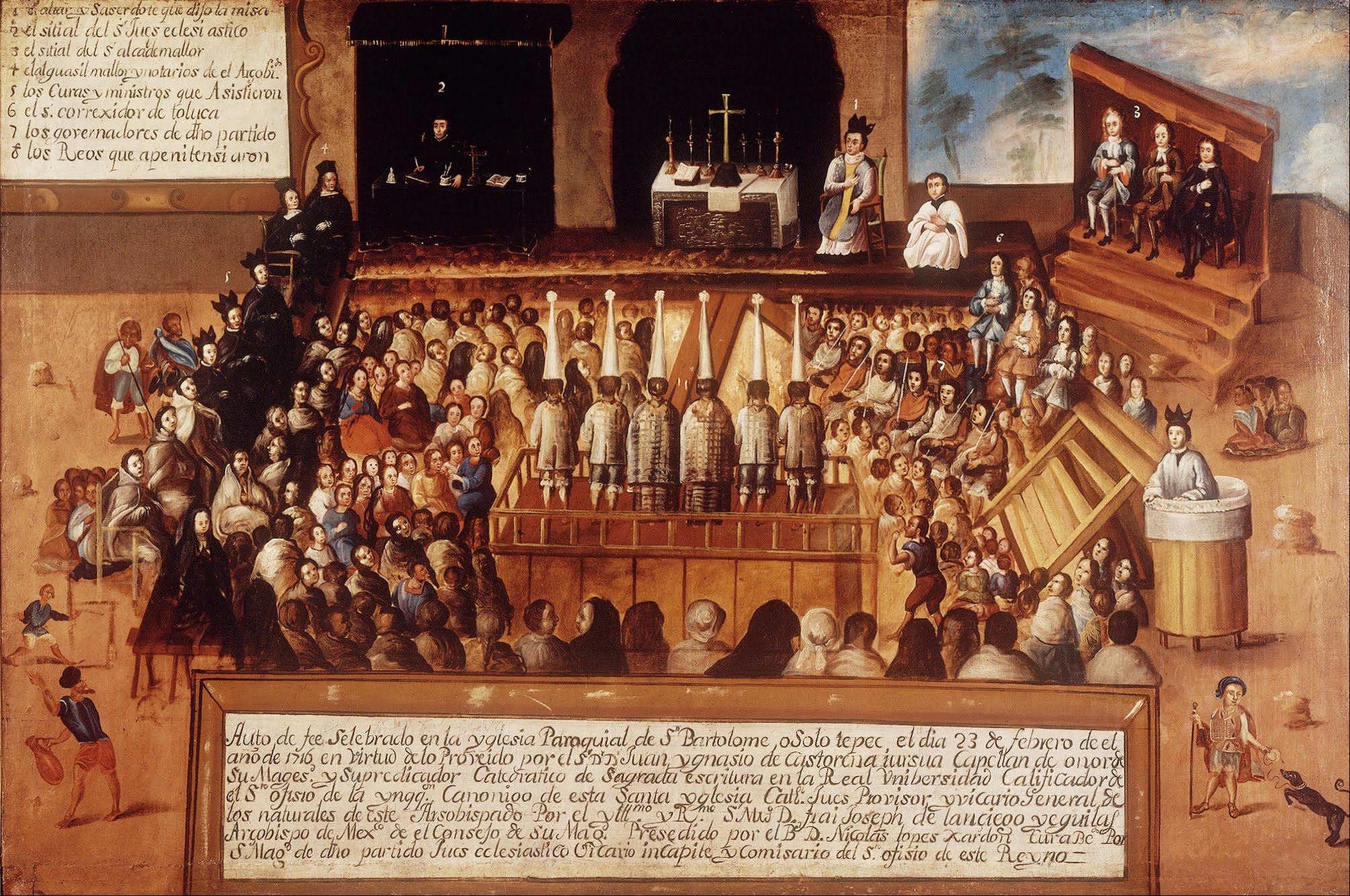
An auto de fe in New Spain, 18th century

In 1570, King Philip II instructed the Holy Office of the Inquisition to establish tribunals in the Spanish colonies. One was located in the city of Mexico, covering the Viceroyalty of New Spain. The other was located in the city of Lima, covering the Viceroyalty of Peru.

When Holy Office of the Inquisition had been established in New Spain in 1571, it exercised no jurisdiction over Indians, except for material printed in indigenous languages. Its first official Inquisitor was archbishop Pedro Moya de Contreras, who established the "Tribunal de la Fe" (Tribunal of the Faith) in Mexico City. Through the Holy Office he transferred to Mexico the principles of the Inquisition set by Tomás de Torquemada in Spain. However, the full force of the Inquisition would be felt on non-Indian populations, such as the "Negro," "mulatto," and even certain segments of European colonial population. Historian Luis González Obregón estimates that 51 death sentences were carried out in the 235–242 years that the tribunal was officially in operation. However, records from this time are very poor and accurate numbers cannot be verified.

One group that suffered during this time were the so-called “crypto-Jews” of Portuguese descent. Jews who refused to convert to Christianity had been expelled from Spain in 1492 and from Portugal in 1497. When Spain and Portugal united shortly thereafter, many converted Portuguese Jews came to New Spain looking for commercial opportunities. Following the voluntary confession of one Crypto-Jew, Gaspar Robles, a younger member of a merchant family, his closest kin and other members of Mexico City's merchant families came under suspicion. In 1642, 150 of these individuals were arrested within three or four days, and the Inquisition began a series of trials. These people were accused and tried for being "judaisers," meaning they still practiced Judaism. Many of these were merchants involved in New Spain's principal activities. On 11 April 1649, the viceregal state staged the largest ever auto de fe in New Spain, in which twelve of the accused were burned after being strangled and one person, Tomás Treviño de Sobremontes, was burned alive, since he refused to renounce his Jewish faith. The Inquisition also tried accused Crypto-Jews who had already died, removing their bones from Christian burial grounds. At the Gran Auto de Fe of 1649, these deceased convicted Crypto-Jews were burned in effigy, along with their earthly remains.

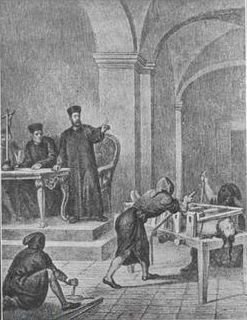
Torture of Francisca Nuñez de Carabajal at Mexico, from El Libro Rojo, 1870

The best known case of a Crypto-Jew prosecuted by the Inquisition was that of Luis de Carvajal y de la Cueva. Born Jewish in Mogadouro, Portugal in 1537, from what may have been an old, Spanish converso family. However, he was married to a woman, Guiomar de Rivera, who would not give up her Hebraic faith even though he tried to convert her. Finally, when she decided to stay behind as he went to the West Indies to trade wine, he moved on to New Spain. There he became a businessman but was more noted as a soldier. He fought for the Spanish against the Indians in Xalapa and the Huasteca areas. Having made a name for himself, he brought a number of his family members over from Spain to live in the frontier state of Nuevo León. Raiding in that area, he was alleged to have made a fortune capturing and selling Indian slaves. It was rumored that the family were secretly practicing Judaic rites. He was brought before the Inquisition and had 22 chapters of charges, including slave trading, read against him but the main charge was reverting to the Judaic faith. He was convicted in 1590 and sentenced to a six-year exile from New Spain but died before the sentence could be imposed. Later, on 8 December 1596, most of his extended family, including his sister Francisca and their children, Isabel, Catalina, Leonor, and Luis, as well as Manuel Díaz, Beatriz Enríquez, Diego Enríquez, and Manuel de Lucena, a total of nine people, were tortured and burned at the stake on the Zócalo in Mexico City. The most famous, a nephew, Luis de Carabajal the younger, a leader in the community of crypto Jews, tried to kill himself by jumping out a window to avoid further torture but was burned at the stake in 1596 with the rest of his family.

Another case was that of Nicolás de Aguilar. Aguilar was a mestizo, the descendant of a Spanish soldier and a Purépecha. He was appointed as a civil official in a district in New Mexico. He attempted to protect the Tompiro Indians from abuses by Franciscan priests. In 1662, due to complaints about him by the Franciscans, he was arrested, imprisoned, and charged with heresy. Tried in Mexico City, Aguilar vigorously defended himself but was convicted and sentenced to undergo a public auto de fe and banned from New Mexico for 10 years and government service for life.

After a series of denunciations, authorities arrested 123 people in 1658 on suspicion of homosexuality. Although 99 of these managed to disappear, the Royal Criminal Court sentenced fourteen men from different social and ethnic backgrounds to death by public burning, in accordance to the law passed by Isabella the Catholic in 1497. The sentences were carried out together on one day, 6 November 1658. The records of these trials and those that occurred in 1660, 1673, and 1687 suggest that Mexico City, like many other large cities at the time, had an active gay underworld.

The last group that had to be careful during this time was scholars. During the 1640s and 1650s the Inquisition ended early attempts to reform the educational curriculum when educators tried to keep pace with contemporary European influences. The central target was Fray Diego Rodriguez (1569–1668), who took the First Chair in Mathematics and Astronomy at the Royal and Pontifical University of Mexico in 1637, and tried to introduce the scientific ideas of Galileo and Kepler to the New World. For thirty years, he argued the removal of theology and metaphysics from the study of science. He was the leader of a small circle of academics that met semi-clandestinely in private homes to discuss new scientific ideas. Political struggles of the 1640s, however, brought the suspicions of the Inquisition down upon them and a series of investigations and trials followed into the middle of the 1650s. When academics worked to hide books banned by the Holy Office's edict in 1647, the Inquisition required all six booksellers in the city to subject their lists to scrutiny under the threat of fine and excommunication.

A unique and spectacular case prosecuted by the Inquisition was of Irishman William Lamport, who had transformed himself into Don Guillén de Lombardo, bastard half-brother of King Philip IV, and attempted to foment rebellion among dissident elements in Mexico City and have himself named as king. This would-be king was denounced to the Inquisition in 1642 and was executed at the auto de fe of 1659. He is considered by some as a precursor of Mexican Independence, and there is a statue of him inside the base of the Monument to Independence in Mexico City.

Those sentenced under the Inquisition usually were punished. The most extreme punishment was execution, carried out in a ceremony called the auto de fe, almost all of which were carried out in Mexico City. For these events, notables and most of the populace turned out in their finest garb. The Church set up a stage with pulpits and rich furnishings for the noble guests. Tapestries and fine cloth served as decorative canopies over the stage. No expense was spared in order to show the power and authority of the ecclesiastical hierarchy. In addition, all nobles from the viceroy himself, his court, and all others in position of authority would be conspicuously in appearance. The ceremony began with a sermon and a long declaration of what constituted the true faith. The assembly was required to swear to this. The condemned were led onto the stage dressed in capes with marks showing their crime and their punishment. They also wore a hat that resembled a dunce cap. They were given a chance to repent, in many cases, to modify their sentences, such as strangulation instead of burning alive at the stake. Then sentences were carried out.

The Inquisition remained officially in force until the early 19th century. It was first abolished by decree in 1812. However, political tensions and chaos led to an abbreviated return between 1813 and 1820. It was abolished in 1820.

== See also ==
- Converso
- Morisco
- Crypto-Islam
- Crypto-Judaism
- Judaizer
- Limpieza de sangre
- Marrano
- New Christian
- Palace of Inquisition
- Peruvian Inquisition
