= Convento de Santo Domingo, Cartagena =

Convent in Cartagena de Indias, Colombia

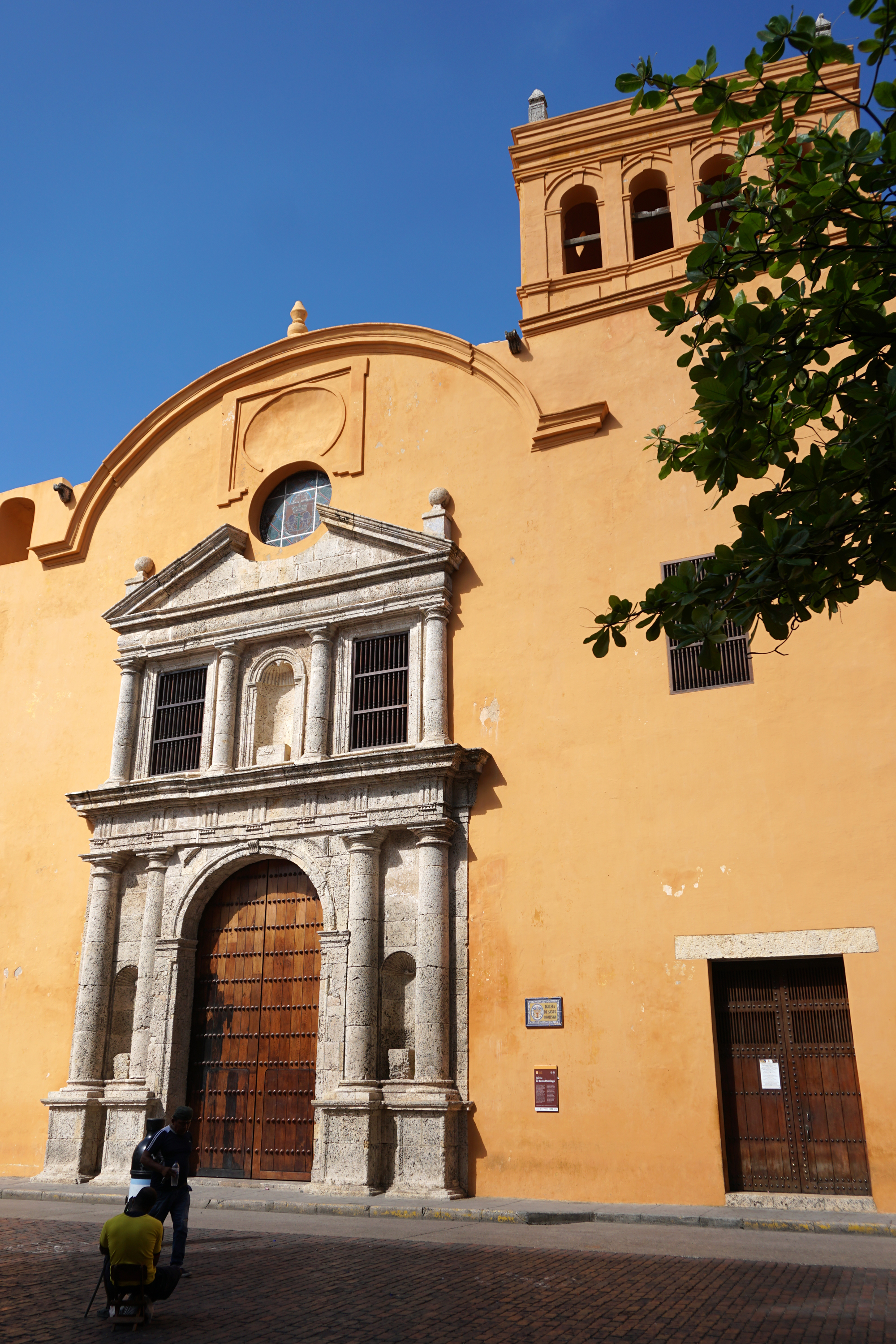
Church of Santo Domingo, Cartagena, after its restoration.

The Convento de Santo Domingo is a Catholic convent established from the 16th century in the city of Cartagena, Colombia. Its canonical name was Convento de San Daniel. Until 19th century, it housed a community from the Dominican Order. The building was then expropriated and handed over to the Archdiocese of Cartagena, serving as a seminary, college and an institute of fine arts. It is one of the most important tourist sites in the city.

== Origin of the convent ==
In 1531, two years after the first arrival of the Dominican friars to the shores of the so-called "New Kingdom of Granada" and following the method used of evangelization attached to the Conquest, a small group of them accompanied the conqueror Pedro of Heredia in its task of exploration of the region of Calamarí.

In June 1533, the city of Cartagena de Indias was founded, thought from the beginning as a city-port of great relevance for the colonizing task. That is why, three months later, the creation of a diocese was organized in this place, the second of these lands, after Santa Marta. As first bishop, the Dominican Salamancan Fr. Tomás de Toro y Cabero was chosen on April 24, 1534. His government was brief, for he died two years later, after facing serious struggles with the encomenderos, at the head of Pedro de Heredia himself, due to its excesses with the natives.

From the very origin of the city, the friars dedicated themselves to the teaching of Christian doctrine to the natives entrusted, in towns and villages of the region. As the new population prospered, it was thought to create a convent, which would serve as a basis for evangelization tasks, and contribute to intellectual formation and observance. Thus, while the bulls were issued for the second bishop of the diocese, the also Dominican Fr. Jerónimo de Loaisa, the order was sent to organize a regular convent in the city, which began to be built that year, under the invocation of "Saint Joseph", although everyone knew him as "Sant Dominic" because this was the saint founder of the religious order of the Dominicans. Its first prior was Fr. Juan de Ávila.

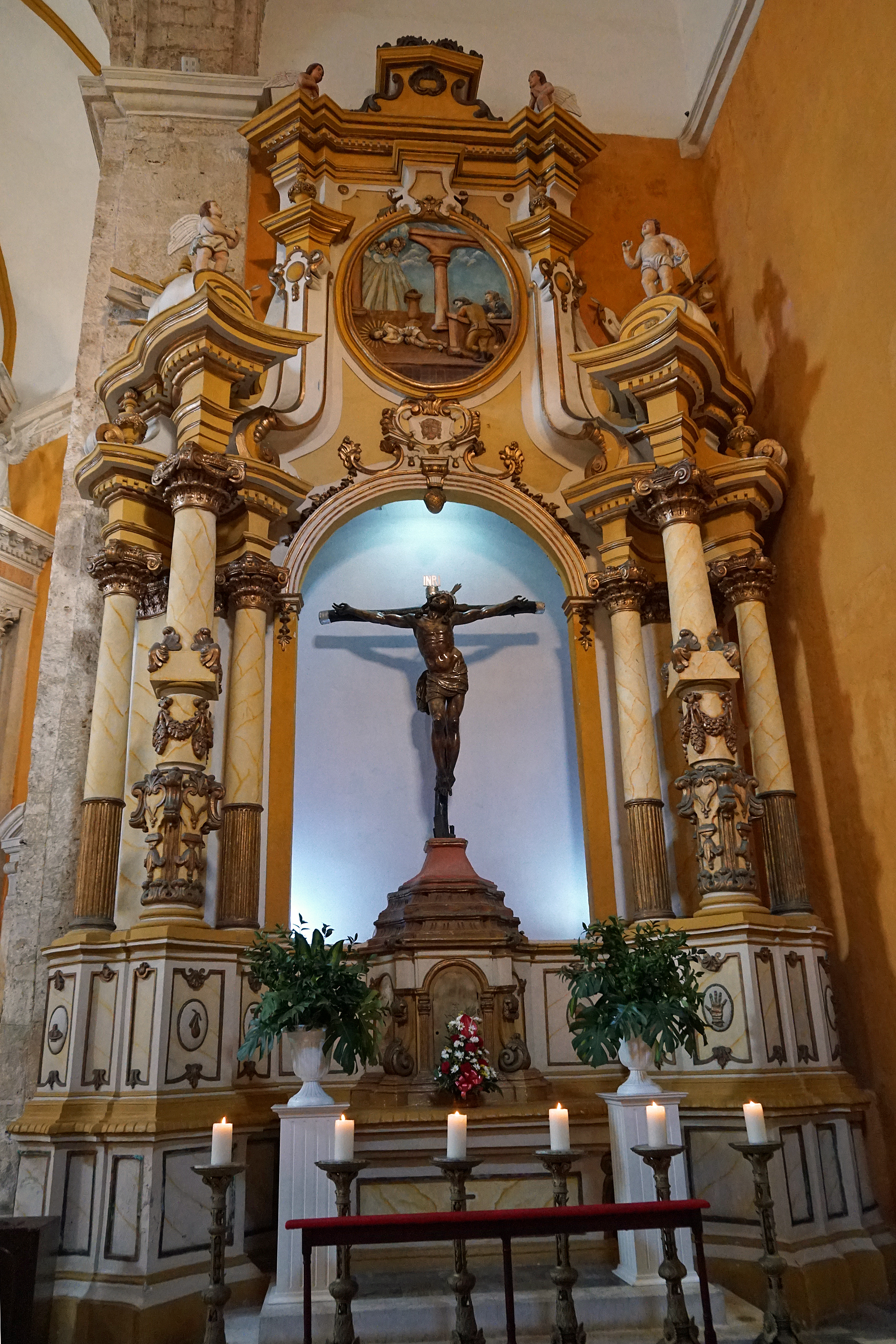
Altar with the wooden image of "Cristo de la Expiración" ("Christ of Expiration")

The first seat of the convent was located in the square "Plaza de la Yerba" (Plaza de los Coches) and it was no more than a temporary shed of straw and mud, which was not very strong. And although there was the essential, community life, the building still lingered on being erected.

After an agitated crosses of letters, reports, petitions and certificates, towards 1549, thanks to the initiative of Fr. José de Robles, the construction of the Convent headquarters was begun. In February 1552 a fire destroyed the city and a better place had to be found for the Dominican convent, on a lot donated by Francisco Lípari. As is usual, the work was totally in charge of the indigenous of the encomiendas, who also had to hand over part of their own property. The contribution of the Spanish encomenderos in a beginning was minimal. For this reason, the initial construction was not a big thing: a rustic house of straw and mud, with a chapel, in which, because of its fragility, "the Blessed Sacrament could not be had, especially because of the danger of fires" according to the documents.

Then came the years of stagnation, where, in spite of the efforts of the friars, the Spaniards of the city were reluctant to collaborate in the construction of the conventual seat. Meanwhile, through its doors entered and left numerous Dominican missions coming from Spain, destined to diverse regions of the New World.

At last, about 1565, the prior Fr. Pedro Mártir Palomino, seeing the house threatening to ruin, entrusted to the friars doctrine, to take advantage of the preaching of Lent "to see if they could make some fruit with their sermons and get some alms to start the sumptuous building of our church and convent."

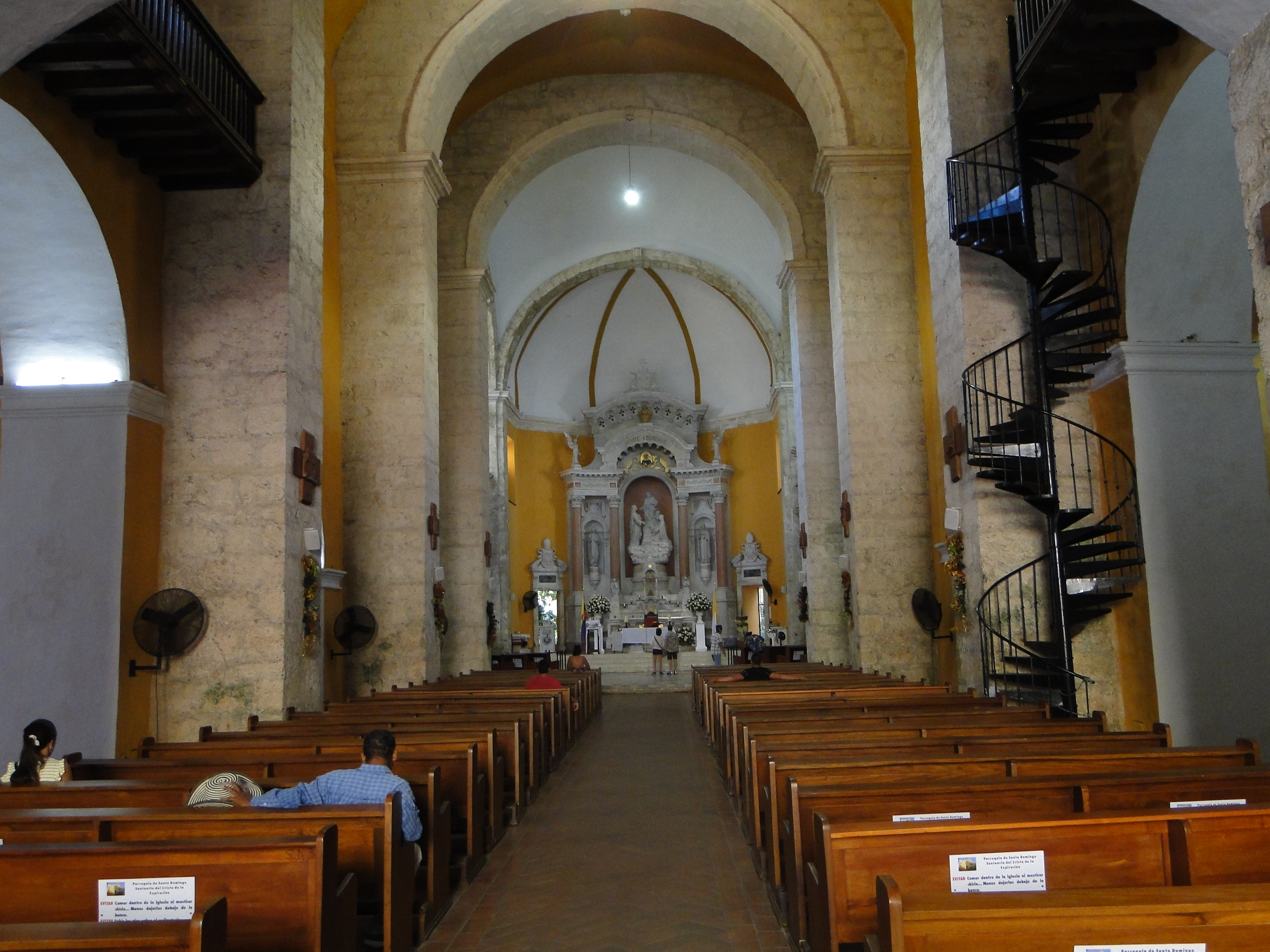
Convento de Santo Domingo (interior view)

And although there was an effort to build, the funds appeared very slowly, so the construction process took approximately 150 years. Thus, at the time of building, it was necessary to repair what was already built and deteriorating rapidly in the warm atmosphere of Cartagena. The works only began in 1578. Two years later, the new convent only had the bases and religious offices continued to be held in temporary places; Meanwhile, the numerous friars managed to live in only seven table cells. And although in 1596 the King ordered an aid of 5,000 pesos for the convent of Santo Domingo and the one of San Agustín, in 1623 the ceiling of the conventual church barely covered half of enclosure. Finally, in 1630 the temple was finished, but by the end of the 17th century the first convent cloister remained unfinished, and we still find in 1730 references to donations made by the King for the construction and repair of the Convent.

The large investment and long work produced a building not very attractive on the outside, as the chronicler Friar Alonso de Zamora, who described it at the beginning of the 18th century as a convent of "yellow facade; Those grate-like lattice-like windows, that massive church, whose rounded ceilings resemble a gigantic turtle, that crumpled dome, that rough quadrangular bell tower, that unfinished tower whose crumbling ruined walls are covered with vegetables and shelter owls, All that causes a deep sadness," nothing to do with the exterior grandeur of the other great Dominican convent in New Granada, the "convento de Santo Domingo, of Santa Fe de Bogotá. However, the chronicler continues, "all that is changed in admiration when one crosses the threshold and contemplates the grand quadrilateral of the cloisters, ten meters high and proportionally wide, on two floors"; A spacious and airy building, simple, large, eloquent. To say of own and strangers, the convent of Santo Domingo was the most beautiful construction that existed in the city.

== Center of evangelization in doctrines ==
The Convento de Santo Domingo, raised curiously on an old indigenous center, was born and had its being put in place of formation of missionary friars and center of doctrinal diffusion in the bordering regions. For this reason, many of the Dominicans assigned to this convent worked, especially during the 16th, 17th and 18th centuries in doctrines of natives, returning periodically to make regular life. It was important the work that during the 16th century, several of them did in defense of the Natives, against the exploitation of which they were object by the encomenderos. By 1763 the Convent was still in charge of the doctrines of San Andrés, Morroa, Piojo, Malambo, Ciénega, Gaira, Sitionuevo y Simaña.

== Formation and study place ==
This place also became center of studies for the friars. It had its own noviciate and it imparted the philosophical-theological formation required by the constitutions of the Order. Its conventual study was erected canonically and was the third in importance, after those of Santa Fe de Bogotá and Tunja. Also, the convent of Santo Domingo, or "San José" of Cartagena, had the right to send annually two outstanding friars to carry out doctoral studies in the University of Santo Tomás of Santa Fe de Bogotá. It even went on to teach theology, of compulsory attendance, to secular priests and clerics of higher orders residing in the city.

== Economic center ==
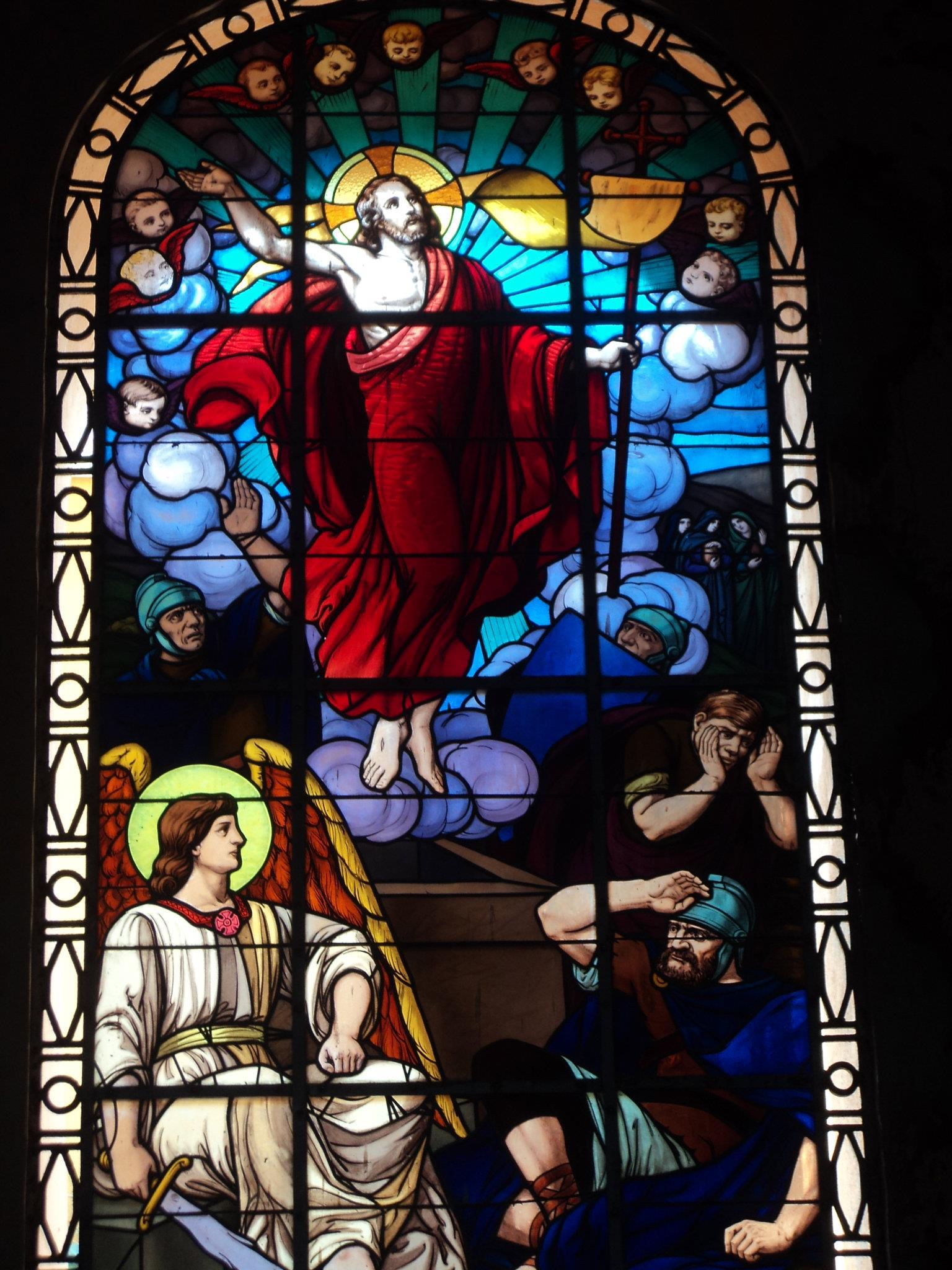
Stained glass in the convent

Cartagena was a port city and merchant by nature and the Dominican convent could not escape this business atmosphere. For that reason, the community soon acquired many movable and immovable property and became an important lender, thanks to the system of censuses, chaplains and pious works, favoring the call by the historians "economy of salvation".

== Collaborator of the court of the Inquisition ==
It is known that in 1610 the Inquisition was inaugurated in Cartagena de Indias, and although the Dominicans were not in front of the court (except in one opportunity), yes they collaborated, like the other religious communities in the city, in the role of qualifiers, charged with theological study of propositions considered heretical, and to seek the repentance of the accused. On the other hand, in this Cartagenian convent were celebrated at least two auto de fés, in 1648 and 1654.

== Cemetery ==
The Dominican Convent of Cartagena, as was usual in the sacred sites at that time, was a very desirable place for the personalities of the city to bury their dead, acts that became massive in times of epidemics. During excavations carried out for the process of restoration of the Convent, a significant number of tombs of children in courtyards and corridors of the Convent were found, which gives clues for a study on infant mortality during the period.

== Restoration ==
The restoration of the Convento de Santo Domingo was carried out between 2001 and 2004 under a cooperation agreement between the Agencia Española de Cooperación Internacional para el Desarrollo (AECID) and the Archdiocese of Cartagena, the legal owner of the building. The project aimed to rehabilitate the monument for adaptive reuse as the Centro de Formación de la Cooperación Española (CFCE) while preserving its architectural, historical, and symbolic values.

Overview of Degradation: Macroscopic Causes

By the end of the 20th century, the Convento de Santo Domingo exhibited widespread material and structural degradation, caused by a combination of macroscopic, interrelated factors:

a) Environmental Conditions

-High humidity, salt-laden winds, and tropical rains typical of Cartagena’s coastal climate.

-Persistent capillary rise due to a shallow ground water table and poor drainage.

b) Incompatible Past Intervention

-Use of cement mortars and plasters, which trapped moisture and led to internal wall decay.

-Structural overloads from concrete additions (notably the western wing).

-Replacement of traditional flat terraces

with sloped tiled roofs, altering drainage behavior.

c) Functional Abandonment and Lack of Maintenance

-After the seminary vacated the building in 1995, prolonged disuse accelerated decay.

-Outdated plumbing and electrical systems, with leaks and failures contributing to further deterioration

=== Architectural and Structural Interventions ===
==== Demolition of Incompatible Additions ====
The concrete western wing (20th century) was dismantled due to its spatial and material incompatibility. This allowed recovery of the cloister’s original volumetric unity and courtyard proportions.

==== Structural Consolidation ====
- Reinforcement of foundations using compatible methods.
- Stabilization of arcades through injection of lime-based grouts.
- Correction of roof-induced thrust through replacement with lighter wooden structures in traditional configuration.

==== Reconstruction of the Western Gallery ====
- Rebuilt using traditional masonry and carpentry techniques.
- Roofs restored with par-and-nudillo trusses, guayacán beams, and curved ceramic tiles.
- New wooden floors, doors, and windows crafted by Escuela Taller apprentices.

== See also ==
- List of colonial buildings in Cartagena, Colombia

== Bibliography ==
- ARIZA S., Alberto, O.P. Los Dominicos en Colombia. Santafé de Bogotá, Provincia de San Luis Bertrán, 1992. Volume I
- DORTA, Enrique Marco. Cartagena de Indias puerto y plaza fuerte. Bogotá, Fondo Cultural Cafetero, 1988
- MESANZA, Andrés, O.P. Apuntes y Documentos sobre la orden Dominicana en Colombia (de 1680 a 1930), Caracas, 1936
- THERRIEN, Monika. "El Espacio Urbano de Cartagena de Indias en la Colonia". Historia Crítica, No. 2, July–December de 1989.
- URUETA, José P.; Gutiérrez de Piñeres, Eduardo. Cartagena y sus cercanías. Guía descriptiva. Cartagena, Tipografía de Vapor Mogollón, 1912.
- ZAMORA, Alonso. Historia de la Provincia de San Antonino del Nuevo Reino de Granada. Tomo III.(Original 1701) Bogotá, Instituto Colombiano de Cultura Hispánica. Editorial Kelly, 1980.
