= Jacob van Langren =

Dutch cartographer and globe-maker

J. Fl. van Langren
- Born: c. 1525; Gelderland, Netherlands
- Died: 27 July 1610 (aged 84–85); Alkmaar, Netherlands
- Occupation: Cartographer

Jacob van Langren (Note: The name appears under a wide variety of forms. His first name was sometimes latinized as Jacobus even in Dutch. His last name is sometimes latinized as Langrenus or given as Langren, Langelaer, or Van Langelaar. His middle name is variously given as Floris, Floriz, Florens, Florentius, Floresz, Floreisz, Florissoon, and Floriszoon. He was also sometimes distinguished as Jacobus Florentius Ultrajectensis or Jacobus Florens Trajectensis, both meaning "from Utrecht".) (c. 1525 – 27 July 1610) was a Dutch cartographer and globe-maker who established a family dynasty of three generations in those professions.

== Early life ==
Jacob van Langren was born in Gelderland but moved to the Southern Netherlands and later to Amsterdam, where his sons Arnold and Hendrik were born.

== Career ==
By 1580, van Langren was producing globes in Amsterdam in collaboration with his son Arnold. That year, they presented one of their globes to officials in Amsterdam as an example of their work, with their names inscribed on it as the makers. However, no confirmed example of the 1580 globe is known to survive. The earliest surviving terrestrial globe attributed to van Langren dates from 1585 and is preserved in the Astronomical Museum in Rome. Another globe of the same year, formerly held at the Jesuit Collegio Romano in Rome, includes a dedication to King Christian IV of Denmark.

These were the first ever produced in the northern Low Countries. Over the next fifty years, the Van Langrens continued to revise and improve their engravings; Petrus Plancius collaborated on the 1589 edition. In 1592, the States General granted the Van Langren family a monopoly in the production of globes, which led to quarrels with Jodocus Hondius. His grandson Michael van Langren was also a cartographer.

== Death ==
Jacob died in Alkmaar in 1610, where he is buried in the Grote Kerk.
