= C/1652 Y1 =

Comet

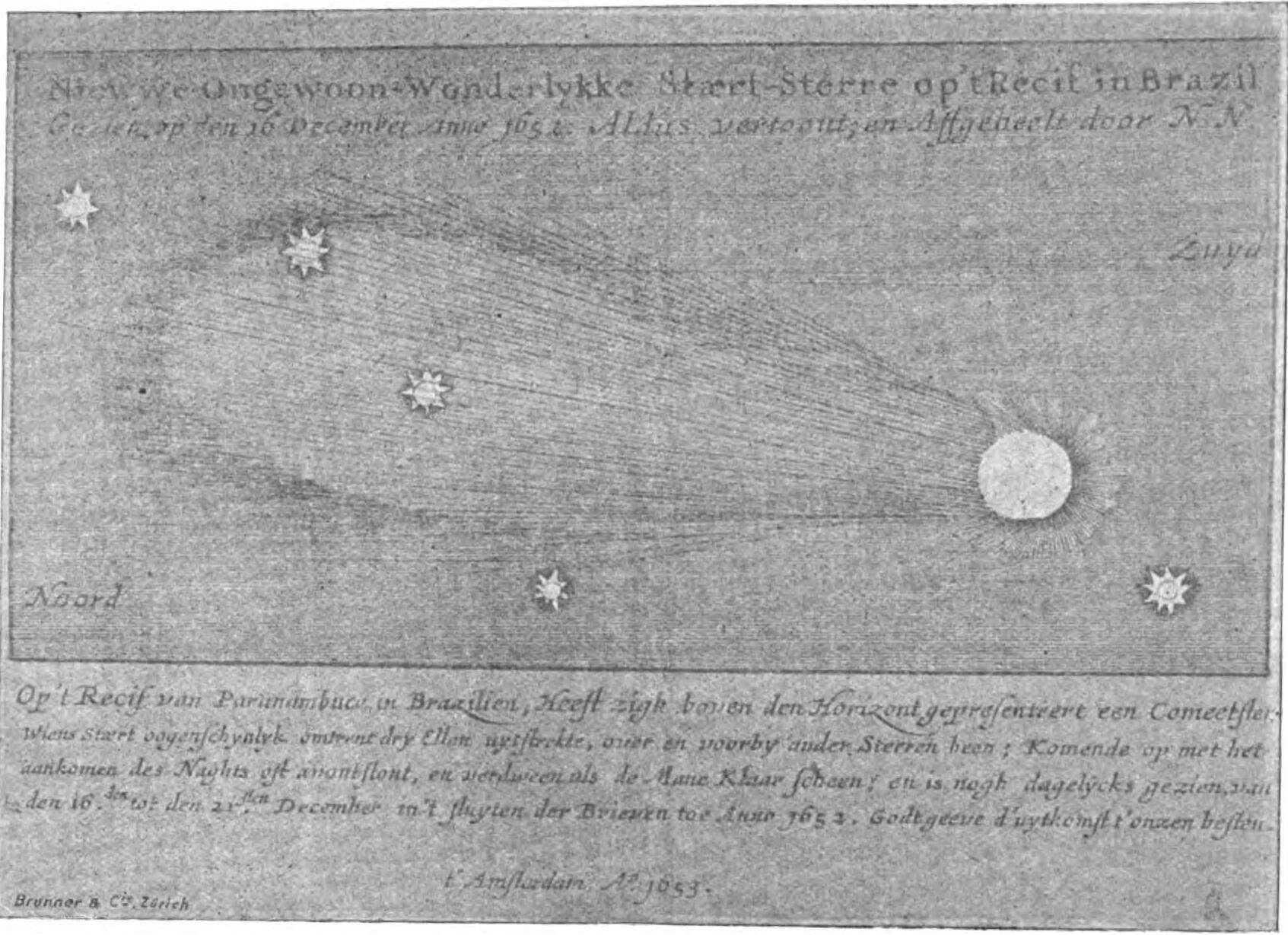
- Illustration from 1652

Discovery
- Discovered by: Diego Rodríguez
- Discovery date: 14 December 1652

Orbital characteristics
- Epoch: 13 November 1652 (JD 2324757.653)
- Observation arc: 18 days
- Number of observations: 54
- Perihelion: 0.8475 AU
- Eccentricity: ~1.000
- Inclination: 79.461°
- Longitude of ascending node: 93.001°
- Argument of periapsis: 300.19°
- Last perihelion: 13 November 1652

C/1652 Y1 was a naked-eye comet observed, among others, by Jan van Riebeeck. It was first spotted on 14 December 1652, in Mexico City, by Novohispano friar Diego Rodríguez, and next sighted on 16 December 1652, by Dutch observers at Pernambuco (Brazil).

As of June 2008 the comet was about 280 AU from the Sun (very approximate due to poorly determined orbit).
