= Diego Rodríguez (mathematician) =

Mexican mathematician and astronomer

Diego Rodríguez (Atitalaquia c.1596, in Mexico City – 1668) was a mathematician, astronomer, educator, and technological innovator in New Spain. He was one of the most important figures in the scientific field in the colony in the second half of the seventeenth century.

== Background ==
In 1613 he entered the Order of the Blessed Virgin Mary of Mercy.

== Scientific revolution ==
For thirty years Father Rodríguez maintained in his writing and teaching the separation of the exact sciences from metaphysics and theology. He tried to propound the heliocentric theory of Nicolaus Copernicus without, in his writings, openly breaking with the scholastic tradition. He wrote on the astronomical findings of Galileo Galilei, but without directly endorsing them or attacking the classical cosmology. Nevertheless, these were radical steps, and the scientific community he headed in Mexico accepted them about 30 years before their colleagues in Spain. One reason for this surprising difference is that the books of modern science originating in Protestant countries were refused entry into Spain by the censors. Booksellers, in order not to lose their investments, often sent the contraband books on to America. Because of this aspect of Rodriguez's work, he was a target of Mexican Inquisition.

Rodríguez was at the center of a small circle of intellectuals that met semi-clandestinely in private homes to discuss the new ideas. The 1640s, however, brought them to the attention of the Inquisition. A series of investigations and trials followed, continuing into the mid-1650s. A frantic hiding of books followed the Inquisition's 1647 edict imposing careful censorship on scientific works. In July 1655 the Inquisition required all Mexico City's booksellers (six) to submit their book lists to the Holy Office for approval, on pain of fine and excommunication.

Melchor Pérez de Soto, one of the group of scientific modernizers headed by Diego Rodríguez and chief architect at the cathedral, was subjected to the Inquisition. Thanks to this process, a catalog of his library, more than 1,660 volumes, has come down to us. Many of the works dealt with the modern science of contemporary Europe; many others had more traditional content.

== Works ==
BBC Rodríguez wrote many works, some of them truly revolutionary contributions to mathematics (like his treatise on logarithms), astronomy and engineering. He also wrote treatises on technology, such as the one dealing with the construction of precise clocks. Many of these works were developed for his own courses in the university; others were written to support his own investigations. In the latter category is the report on the prediction and exact measurement of eclipses, which is fundamental for calculation of exact geographic positions (longitude), because the eclipse permits synchronization of the time with that in other geographic localities. This and his work on the improvement of clocks allowed him to measure the longitude of Mexico City with a precision greater than Alexander von Humboldt was able to make a century and a half later, even with improved methods. Rodríguez's Peruvian student and correspondent, Francisco Ruiz Lozano, used the samtechnique to measure the position of his birthplace, Lima, Peru.

== Evaluation ==
It is strange that the many valuable contributions of Rodríguez and his students did not make a bigger impact on the history of the colony. His methods of calculating positions were not used by Spanish navigators, who could have benefited greatly from them. Most of his writings were never published, remaining in manuscript. In New Spain it was difficult to print them, not only because of high costs but also because special type faces were unavailable, for example, for mathematical symbols. And there was no market for the published works. For that reason some of his manuscripts were sent to Spain, but there was no greater interest there and they were ignored. At his death in 1668, most of his manuscripts were buried in the library of his order; the rest were dispersed in private collections or were irretrievably lost.

Rodríguez's successors in the chair of astronomy and mathematics occupied the position only briefly, and are of little interest, up until Carlos de Sigüenza y Góngora took over the position in 1672.
