= Cristo de la Expiración, Cartagena =

17th-century image of crucified Christ

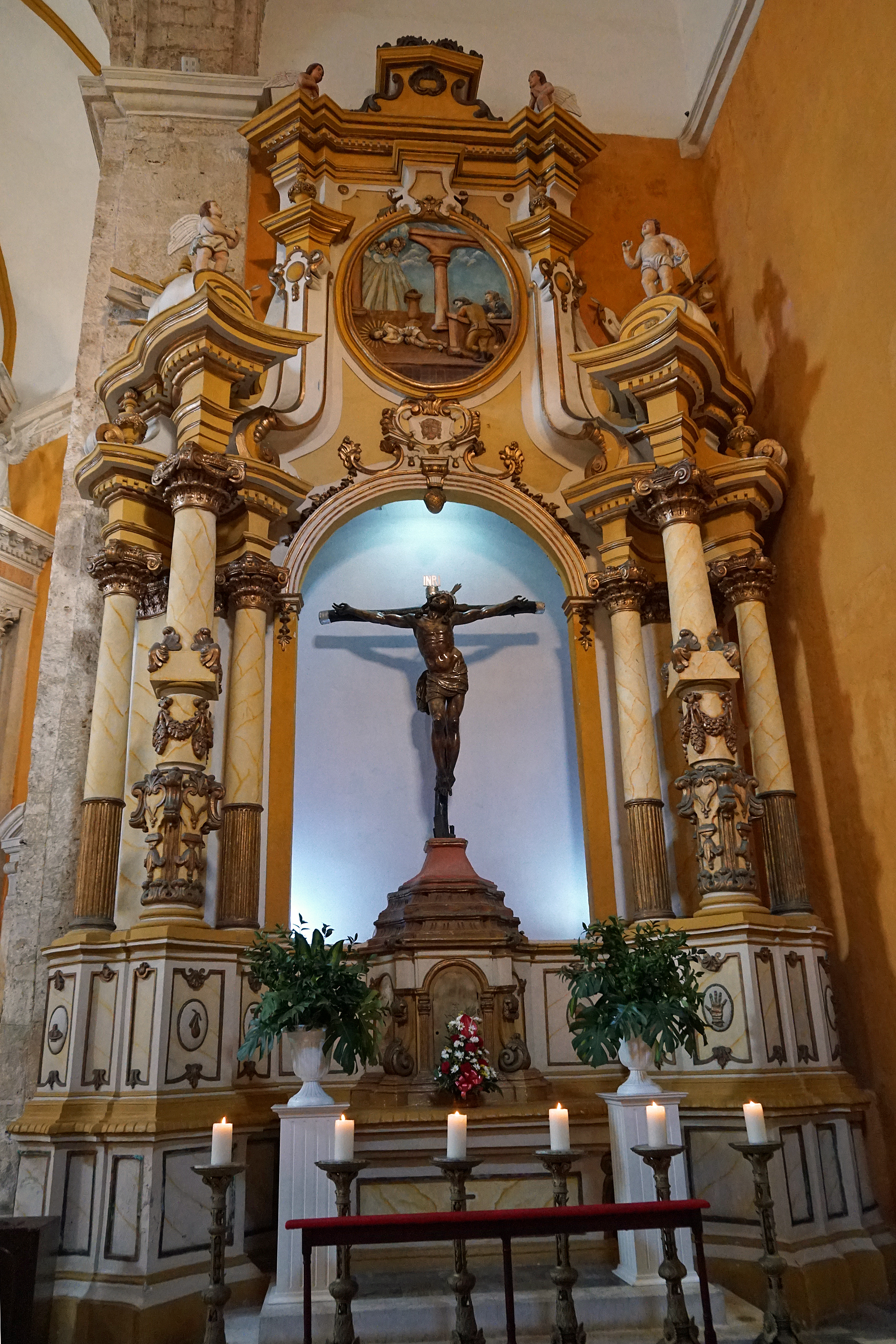
Altar with the wooden image of "Christ of Expiration" at the Church of Convento de Santo Domingo, Cartagena

The Cristo de la Expiración is a 17th-century Roman Catholic devotional wooden image enshrined in the titular Convento de Santo Domingo, in Cartagena de Indias, Colombia, depicting crucified Jesus.

In addition to its architectural beauty, the Convento de Santo Domingo holds precious sacred objects, such as the Christ of Expiration. The chroniclers say that in 1754 an epidemic of smallpox spread, which could only be stopped after praying for nine days to this image, which is why this Christ is an object of special devotion for the Cartagenians.

== Legend of the origin ==
The origin of the Christ of Expiration also has its miraculous chronicle. According to tradition, the novices found a piece of wood by the sea that they gathered with the idea of carving the image of Christ.

Taking advantage of the fact that in those days spent an unknown carver in the Dominican convent, they decided to propose the idea to him. Asked the pilgrim carver, he said that the log was very short for the proposed work. Then the fathers returned the log to the sea.

Days later the religious returned to the beach and found the same tree, but now it measured enough to carve the image. The artisan agreed to do the work, but asked not to be interrupted and to have the food delivered through a window of the room, where he locked himself up for several days. After a couple of weeks the religious stopped listening to the craftsman carving. Worried about this unusual silence, they decided to enter the room.

There they found the image of Christ at the moment of expiration, but no trace of the craftsman. This led to the legend that it was an angel sent by God to make the venerated Christian image. This image was preserved for years in a Baroque style altar, that altar dating from 1807, and is the work of the Cartagenian artist Hermenegildo José de Ayala.

== Cristo de la Expiración Day ==
The Cristo de la Expiración, whose devotion is expressed through prayers, songs and praises, is honored with the pilgrimages that September 14 are made to the temple of Santo Domingo, from where one of the most massive processions that take place in the Historic Center of Cartagena de Indias. The event begins with a tour of the main streets of the sector.
