= Tompiro Indians =

The Tompiro Indians were Pueblo Indians living in New Mexico, in several adobe villages east of the Rio Grande Valley in the Salinas region of New Mexico. Their settlements were abandoned, and they were absorbed into other Pueblo Nations in the 1670s.

== Origin and language ==
Very little is known about the origin of the Tompiros. They spoke a language closely related to that of the Piro Indians, who lived to their west in the Rio Grande Valley. The Piro and Tompiro languages are believed by most authorities to belong to the Tanoan language family.

In the 16th century, the Tompiro lived in nine settlements in the Salinas clustered around the present-day town of Mountainair. Those whose ruins are preserved today are Quarai, Abó, and Gran Quivira, which today make up the Salinas Pueblo Missions National Monument. The ruin known as Gran Quivira today, but during Spanish times as Las Humanas, was the largest settlement and may have had a population of 2,000 people. Las Humanas and the other Tompiro settlements were probably established about 1300 and became culturally similar to the other Pueblo Indians in the Rio Grande Valley. The Tompiro name for Las Humanas was probably Cueloze, but Juan de Oñate named the settlement the "Great Pueblo of the Humanas" when he visited in 1598, the name reflecting the inhabitant's custom of painting stripes or tattooing their faces. The Plains-dwelling Jumano Indians were called by the same name, and authorities differ as to whether they were related to the Tompiros or simply given similar names by the Spaniards.

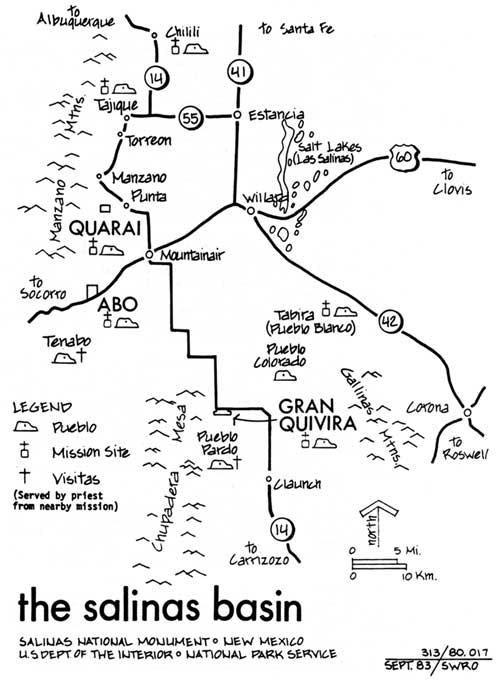
Territory and Settlements and Missions of the Tompiro Indians

As village-dwelling and sedentary Pueblo Indians, the Tompiros lived in a marginal climate. Their region was more than 6,000 feet in elevation, near the upper climatic limit for corn cultivation. They had little surface water for irrigation, rainfall was sparse and sporadic, and winters were long and cold. What made the Tompiro settlements viable was their proximity to salt deposits in the Salinas and to the bison herds of the Great Plains. Thus, they were important traders and middlemen between the Plains Indians and the Pueblos of the Rio Grande Valley for salt and bison skins and meat. The Tompiros also hunted small and large game in the region, especially deer, pronghorn, and rabbits, and gathered wild foods, including pinyon pine nuts.

== Relations with the Spanish ==
Francisco Vásquez de Coronado did not visit the Tompiros during his expedition of 1539–1542. The first Spanish account of the Tompiros is from Antonio de Espejo in 1582–1583. Espejo was greeted with suspicion in the Tompiro settlements. In 1601, the founder of the colony of New Mexico, Juan de Oñate, retaliated for the killing of two Spaniards with a raid on the Tompiros that left, according to one account (probably exaggerating the feat of Spanish arms), 900 Indians dead and three Pueblos destroyed.

The Tompiros were distant from the early Spanish settlements in the Rio Grande Valley, and not until 1627 was a Catholic mission, headed by the Franciscan Fray Alonso de Benavides, established at Las Humanas. Thus began a long struggle between the Spanish missionaries and the Tompiros about religion. At first, Catholicism and the Kiva religion of the Tompiros co-existed, but by 1660, the Franciscans were suppressing the native religion.

The early days of Spanish settlement in New Mexico were characterized by bitter disputes between the civil authorities and the missionaries, as each attempted to exert control – and exploit – the Pueblo Indians. This dispute came to a head among the Tompiros. In 1659, Governor Bernardo López de Mendizábal appointed Nicolás de Aguilar as alcalde mayor (magistrate) of the Tompiro settlements. Aguilar was a Mestizo (part Indian) soldier from Michoacán, Mexico, and he carried out the policy of Governor López forcefully. Among López's dictates were that no Indian would be required to work for the Franciscan priests without pay and that the Indians had the right to practice their religion. He also permitted the Pueblos to perform their religious dances in the Governor's Palace in Santa Fe, thus endorsing religious practices that had been prohibited for 30 years.

Aguilar enforced the governor's policy among the Tompiros over the opposition of the Franciscans. Aguilar went so far as to have Indians whipped who contributed labor to the priests. During a bitterly cold winter when the Franciscans requested Indian assistance to gather firewood, Aguilar told them to burn the 600 wooden crosses they had collected for ceremonies. Aguilar said gathering wood for the priests was too dangerous for the Indians because of Apache raiders lurking in the area. Aguilar also permitted Indian dances and ordered Christian Indians to participate.

The Franciscans took their grievances to the authorities in Mexico City, and López and Aguilar were charged under the Inquisition of obstructing the spread of the Catholic faith. Both were arrested. López died during his trial, but Aguilar defended himself before the Inquisition. Nevertheless, after a long trial, he was convicted and exiled. The Church had won and its authority in New Mexico went unchallenged until 1680, when the Pueblos rose up en masse and expelled the Spanish. The dispute would have consequences. Among the major causes of the Pueblo Revolt were the excesses of the Franciscans in suppressing the traditional religions.

== Last days of the Tompiros ==
The problems of the Tompiros multiplied in the 1660s. European diseases probably took a heavy toll among the Tompiros, as they did among other Pueblos. In addition, drought impacted the viability of the Tompiro economy. A priest stated in 1669, "For three years, no crop has been harvested. In the past year, a great many Indians perished of hunger, lying dead along the roads, in the ravines, and in their huts. There were pueblos (for instance, Las Humanas) where more than 450 died of hunger…there is not a fanega of corn or wheat in the whole kingdom." Labor required of the Tompiro to build churches and to participate in Catholic religious ceremonies took time away from what the Indians needed to earn their uncertain living in a difficult environment.

Weakened by drought and disease, fractured by religious disputes, the Tompiros were also the closest and most vulnerable of the Pueblos to Apache raiders. The diminished Tompiros began to abandon their settlements to take refuge among their Piro relatives westward on the Rio Grande. In 1670, the residents of Las Humanas moved to Abó. Within a few years, the Salinas Pueblos were all abandoned and the Tompiros had ceased to exist as a distinct people.
