= Francisco Ruiz Lozano =

Francisco Ruiz Lozano, Cosmógrafo Mayor of the Viceroyalty of Peru

Francisco Ruiz Lozano (1607, Oruro, Upper Peru—1677, Mexico City) was a Peruvian soldier, astronomer, mathematician and educator.

Ruiz Lozano was born in Oruro (now in Bolivia). He studied with the Jesuits in Lima at the College of San Martín. It was here that he acquired his love of mathematics. He also studied hydrography, as a mathematical science. In 1651, he moved to Mexico City to continue his studies at the University of Mexico. In Mexico, he also learned navigation, not only in theory, but also in practice. Together with his teacher, Fray Diego Rodríguez, he observed the Comet of 1652. They reported on it in Discurso ethereológico del nuevo cometa, visto en aqueste Hemisferio Mexicano; y generalmente en todo el mundo. Este año de 1652, published that year in Mexico City.

He returned to Lima in 1655 in the party of the new viceroy, Luis Enríquez de Guzmán, conde de Alba de Liste. Enríquez de Guzmán had been viceroy of New Spain, and was now taking up his new position in Peru. He appointed Ruiz Lozano captain of Spanish infantry. He served as the first director of the nautical school founded in 1657 in Lima, at the Hospital of Espiritu Santo, a sailors' hospital. The mission of the nautical academic was "to form men skillful in the handling of ships for the defense of the viceroyalty." He was also cosmógrafo mayor of Peru. The duties of cosmógrafo mayor included publishing almanacs and sailing instructions. He served for several years as the director of the Hospital of Espiritu Santo, improving its building and its financial situation.

In 1658 he married Jacoba de la Cueva, a native of Lima. He was tutor to the sons of Viceroy Enríquez de Guzmán and, together with Juan Ramón Koening, a tutor to the son of the viceroy who succeeded Enríquez de Guzmán, Diego de Benavides y de la Cueva. He held the first university chair of mathematics in Peru.

In 1660 or 1661 he was in Portobelo, Panama, where he acquired various kinds of merchandise. In 1662 he was in Panama City on similar business. Over his lifetime, he pursued mercantile affairs nearly everywhere in Spanish America — Panama, Cartagena de Indias, Acapulco, Valparaíso, Concepción and Talcahuano.

Later, probably under the government of Baltasar de la Cueva Enríquez, Count of Castellar (1674-1678), Ruiz Lozano was named general of the navy of the Southern Sea.

In 1665 in Lima he published Tratado de Cometas, observación y juicio del que se vió en esta ciudad de los Reyes, y generalmente en todo el Mundo, por los fines del año 1664 y principios de 1665 (Treatise on Comets, observation and judgment of what I saw in the City of Kings [Lima], and generally anywhere in the world, from the end of 1664 to the beginning of 1665). This report was the first publication of European astronomical observations in South America. The comet had first been observed on December 11, 1664.

He died in Mexico City, apparently on a commercial venture involving the trading of mercury.
