= Auto-da-fé =

Public penance imposed during the Inquisition

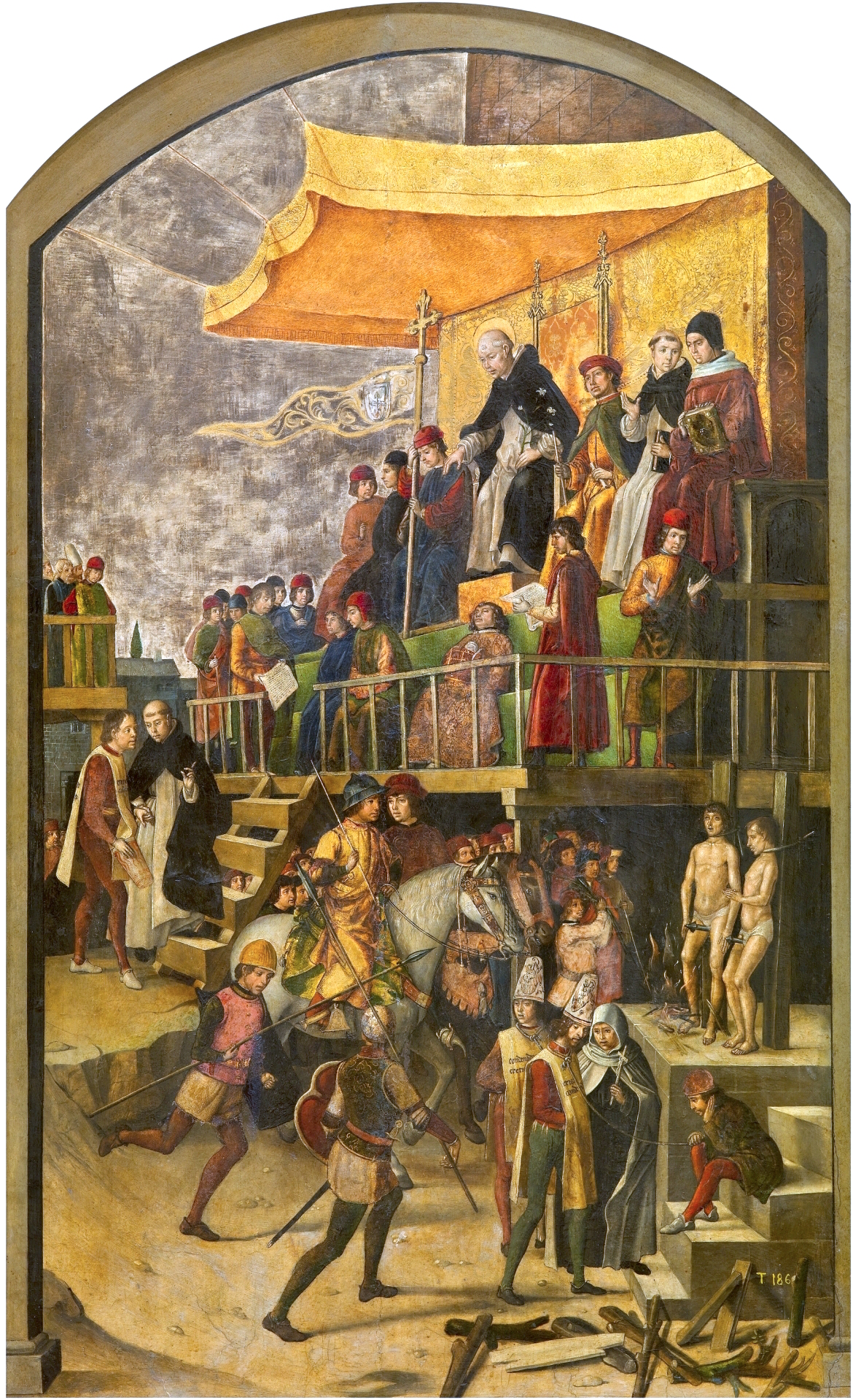
Saint Dominic anachronistically presiding over an auto de fe, by Pedro Berruguete (around 1495)

An auto-da-fé (/ˌɔːtoʊdəˈfeɪ, ˌaʊt-/ AW-toh-də-FAY, OW-; from Portuguese auto de fé or Spanish auto de fe [ˈawto ðe ˈfe], meaning 'act of faith') was a ritualized or public penance carried out between the 15th and 19th centuries in condemnation of heretics, apostates, and minorities such as Jews and Muslims. It was imposed by the Spanish, Portuguese, or Mexican Inquisition as punishment and enforced by civil authorities. Its most extreme form was death by burning.

== History ==
The Inquisition was officially established to root out heresy, particularly among conversos (Jews and Muslims who had converted to Christianity but were suspected of secretly practicing their former faiths). There was a growing concern that these groups threatened the status quo. From that point, Spain became a political melange of different powers and territories, each with its own policies regarding the status of Jews and Muslims. By the 13th century almost all of modern Spain was under Christian rule. Ferdinand III of Castile boasted of being the king of three religions. This tolerance, however, did not last long.

In the 14th century, Dominican and Franciscan priests called on Christians to expel the Jews from Spain, blaming Jews for social problems and stirring the Christian majority to destroy synagogues, burn Jews alive, and impose forced conversion. Jews would be forced to attend sermons and have Christian preachers outline what the Christians viewed as the errors of their ways.

New laws segregated the Jewish population and limited the occupations that were still open to them, with the ultimate goal of conversion. More than 100,000 Jews converted. Once converted, these New Christians joined the "conversos" class, who were afforded the legal and social privileges of a full Christian in society. Many New Christians took advantage of their elevation in status and embraced Christian privileges. After a few generations, the converted Jews identified as nothing more or less than "regular" Christians, and Spain was almost uniformly Christian.

This uniformity brought with it new sources of anxiety. "The mistrust of the Jew as an outsider gave way to an even more alarming fear of the converso as an insider". The differences between religious classes had formerly been very clear. Laws and customs codified Christian dominance in Spain. Once the Jews converted, however, many Christian Spaniards believed that they no longer knew whom they could trust and who could possibly be a treacherous heretic at heart.

In an attempt to assuage these fears, Limpieza de sangre (Purity of Blood) laws were put in place that traced the bloodline of Christians New and Old to see if they had Jewish ancestry. In doing so, Spain divided its Christian class along ethnic and religious lines, "othering" those with Jewish blood much as it had prior to conversion. Influential Christians believed that there was something different in the essence and soul of the person that could not be cured by religious conversion.

On 1 November 1478, Ferdinand II of Aragon and Isabella I of Castile received permission from Pope Sixtus IV to name inquisitors throughout their domains in order to protect Catholicism as the one true Christian faith. The decree originally applied to the Crown of Castile—the domain of Isabella—but in 1483 Ferdinand extended it to his domain of the Crown of Aragon. Autos de fé became quite popular throughout the Spanish realm, competing with bullfights for the public's attention and attended by royalty. Though Ferdinand's action met with occasional resistance and resulted in the assassination of the inquisitor Pedro de Arbués by converted Jews in 1485, between 1487 and 1505 the processing and trying of more than 1,000 heretics was recorded by the Barcelona chapter, of whom only 25 were ultimately absolved.

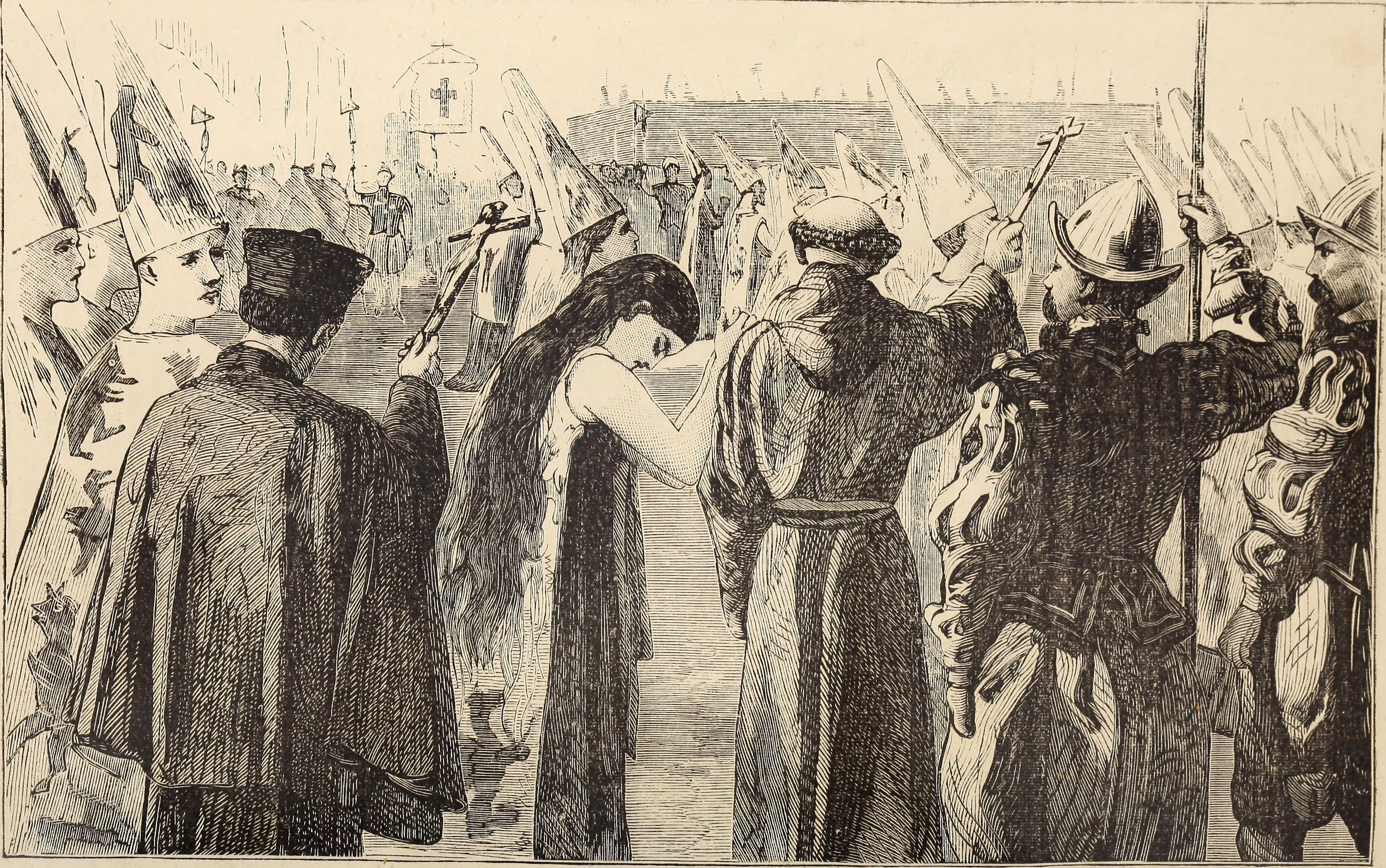
An auto de fé in Seville, illustration from 1870

Once granted permission from the Pope to conduct inquisitions, the monarchs began establishing permanent trials and developing bureaucracies to carry out investigations in most of the cities and communities in their empire. The first Iberian auto de fé took place in Seville in 1481: the six accused were found guilty and executed. Later, Franciscan missionaries brought the Inquisition to the New World.

The Portuguese Inquisition was established in 1536 and lasted officially until 1821. Its influence was much weakened by the late 18th century under the government of the Marquês de Pombal.

Autos de fé also took place in Goa, New Spain, the State of Brazil, and the Viceroyalty of Peru. Contemporary historians of the Conquistadors, such as Bernal Díaz del Castillo, recorded them. Although records are incomplete, one historian estimates that about 50 people were executed by the Mexican Inquisition.

== Scale and numbers ==
The exact number of people executed by the Inquisition is not known. Juan Antonio Llorente, the ex-secretary of the Holy Office, gave the following numbers for the Inquisition excluding the American colonies, Sicily and Sardinia: 31,912 burnt, 17,696 burned in effigy, and 291,450 reconciled de vehementi (i.e., following an act of penance). Later in the nineteenth century, José Amador de los Ríos gave even higher numbers, stating that between the years 1484 and 1525 alone, 28,540 were burned in person, 16,520 burned in effigy and 303,847 penanced. However, after extensive examinations of archival records, modern scholars provide lower estimates, indicating that fewer than 10,000 were actually executed during the whole history of the Spanish Inquisition, perhaps around 3,000.

== Process ==
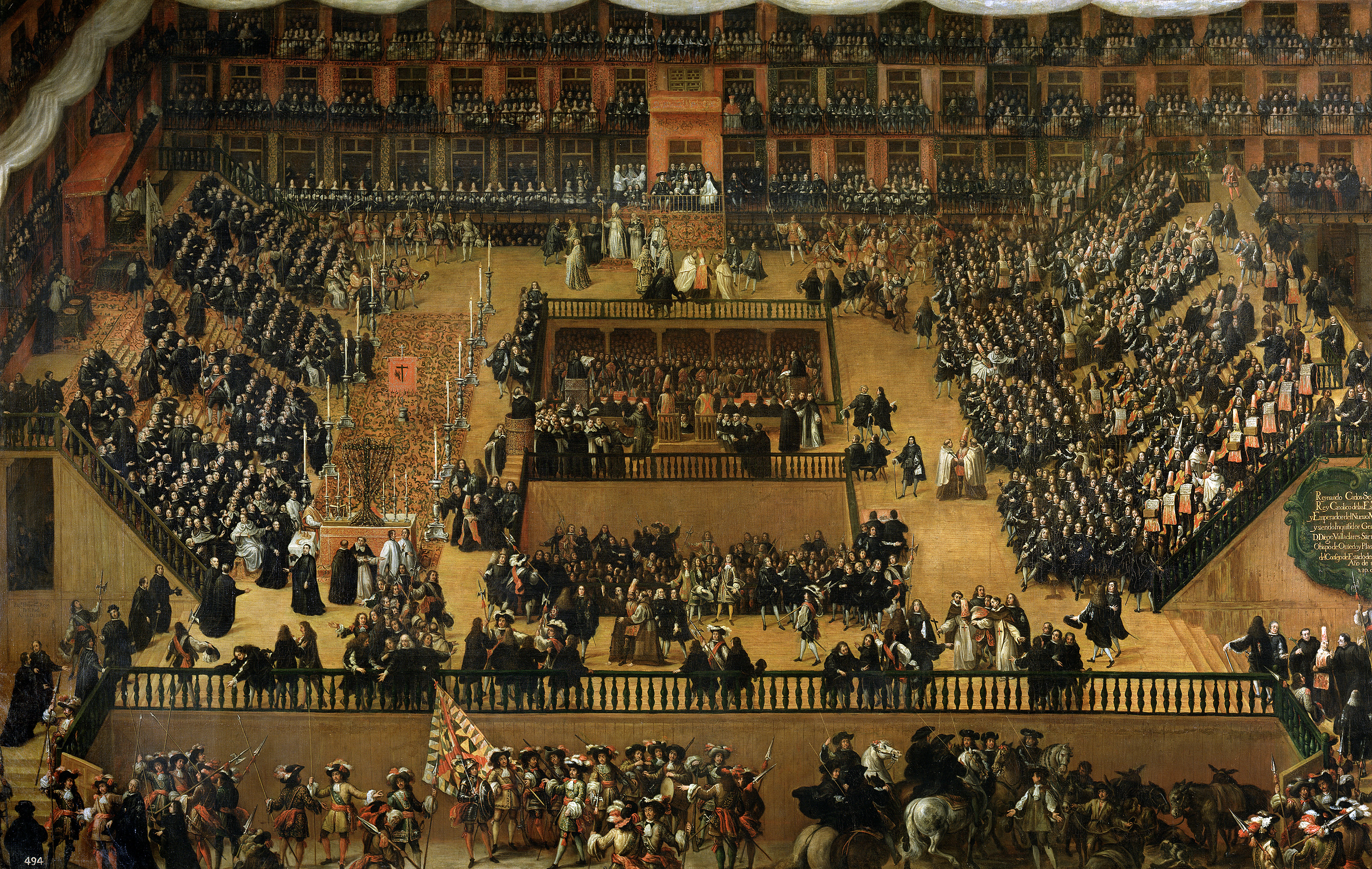
1683 painting by Francisco Rizi of the auto de fé held in Plaza Mayor, Madrid on 30 June 1680

The auto de fé was a major aspect of the tribunals and the final step in the Inquisition process. It involved a Catholic Mass, prayer, a public procession of those found guilty, and a reading of their sentences.

An Inquisition usually began with the public proclamation of a grace period of 40 days. Anyone who was guilty or knew of someone who was guilty was urged to confess. If the accused were charged, they were presumed guilty. Officials could apply torture during the trial. Inquisitors were required to hear and record all testimony. Proceedings were to be kept secret, and the identity of witnesses was not known to the accused.

Officials proclaimed the prisoner's sentence after the trial and administered it in an auto de fé. The auto de fé was not an impromptu event, but thoroughly orchestrated. Preparations began a month in advance and only occurred when the inquisition authorities believed there were enough prisoners in a given community or city. The ritual took place in public squares or esplanades and lasted several hours with ecclesiastical and civil authorities in attendance.

An all-night vigil would be held in or near the city's plaza, with prayers, ending in Mass at daybreak and a breakfast feast prepared for all who joined in.

The ceremony of public penitence then began with a procession of prisoners, who bore elaborate visual symbols on their garments and bodies. These symbols were called sanbenito, and were made of yellow sackcloth. They served to identify the specific acts of heresy of the accused, whose identities were kept secret until the very last moment. In addition, the prisoners usually had no idea what the outcome of their trial had been or their sentencing.

The prisoners were taken to a place called the quemadero or burning place, sometimes located outside the city walls. There the sentences were read. Prisoners who were acquitted or whose sentence was suspended would fall on their knees in thanksgiving, but the condemned would be punished. Artistic representations of the auto de fé usually depict physical punishment such as whipping, torture, and burning at the stake.

The auto de fé was also a form of penitence for the public viewers, because they too were engaging in a process of reconciliation and by being involved were given the chance to confront their sins and be forgiven by the Church.

== Notable events ==
- A particularly notable auto general de fe was held in Madrid's Plaza Mayor on June 30, 1680, during which 117 individuals were sentenced. 65 of them appeared in person and received punishments including flogging, incarceration, hard labor, banishment, destitution, or combinations thereof. 31 were sentenced in effigy, either because they had fled or died, and one deceased individual was posthumously reconciled to the Church. The remaining 21 were condemned to be burned at the stake. More than half of the accused, including most of those executed, were conversos charged with "Judaizing."

== See also ==
- Auto-da-Fé (novel)
