= Giant =

Usually gigantic humanoid, common in folklore

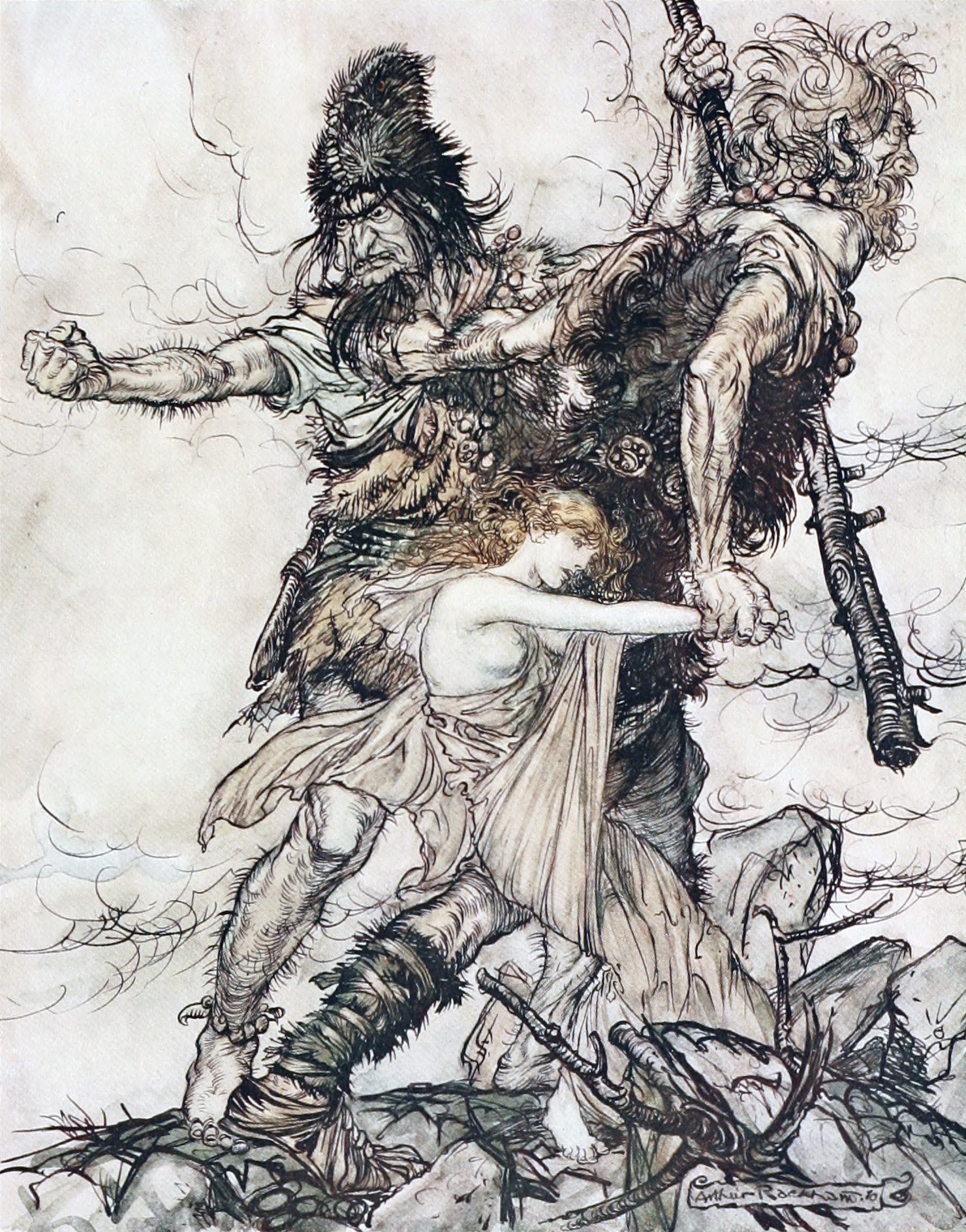
The giants Fafner and Fasolt seize Freyja in Arthur Rackham's illustration of Richard Wagner's Der Ring des Nibelungen.

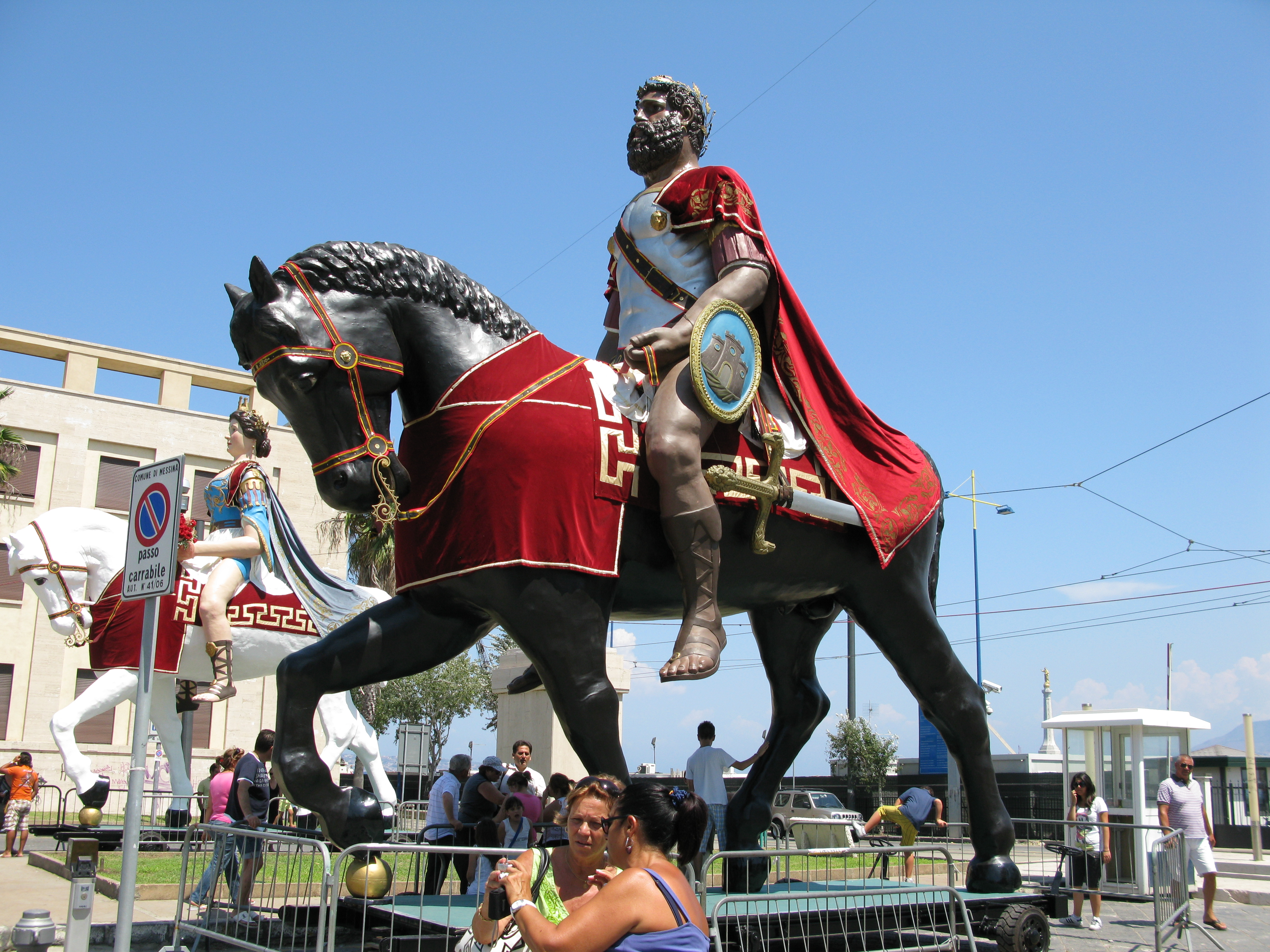
Giants Mata and Grifone celebrated in Messina in August, Sicily, Italy

In folklore, giants (from Ancient Greek: gigas, cognate giga-) are beings of humanoid appearance, but are at times prodigious in size and strength or bear an otherwise notable appearance. The word giant is first attested in 1297 from Robert of Gloucester's chronicle. It is derived from the Gigantes (Ancient Greek: Γίγαντες) of Greek mythology.

Fairy tales such as Jack the Giant Killer have formed the modern perception of giants as dimwitted and violent ogres, sometimes said to eat humans or livestock. In more recent portrayals, like those of Jonathan Swift and Roald Dahl, some giants are both intelligent and friendly.

== Literary and cultural analysis ==
Giants appear many times in folklore and myths. Representing the human body enlarged to the point of being monstrous, giants evoke terror and remind humans of their body's frailty and mortality. They are often portrayed as monsters and antagonists, but there are exceptions. Some giants intermingle with humans in a friendly way and can even be part of human families, their offspring portrayed as regular humans often referred to as half-giants.

Folklorists and historians examine the role giants are assigned in regional geomythologies. For example, Fionn mac Cumhaill is said to have built the Giant's Causeway on the island of Ireland. Per a 1965 examination in an American studies journal,

It is generally admitted today that Paul Bunyan was a synthetic figure conceived by advertising men rather than the spontaneous product of the folk mind, yet he has been adopted by the American people with enthusiasm...Paul and his blue ox Babe are supposed to have altered the appearance of the American continent; the animal's hoof prints became the lake beds of the Northwest and from its drinking trough spilled the Mississippi River.

Fossilized remains of ancient mammals and reptiles common to the Sivalik Hills of India may have influenced aspects of the Mahābhārata that tell of battles in which "hundreds of mighty, and sometimes gigantic, heroes, horses, and war elephants are said to have died."

== Archeology and paleontology ==
Claudine Cohen, in her 2002 book The Fate of the Mammoth, argued that the history of human interaction with fossil bones of prehistoric megafauna was heavily influenced by giant lore. Per Cohen, the proto-scientific study of giants appears in several phases of human history: Herodotus reported that the remains of Orestes were found in Tegea; Pliny described a giant's skeleton found in Crete after an earthquake, and seemed to refer to evolution as the process by which giants become human-size over time; and Saint Augustine mentions what is believed to have been the fossilized molar of an ancient Elephantidae in his City of God, in a passage reflecting on the nature and meaning of the Noahacian deluge.

The academic consideration of giants continued through the Middle Ages, Renaissance, and even the early modern period. Boccaccio devoted a passage of his Genealogies of the Pagan Gods to purported archeological discoveries in Sicily that he thought might be evidence of the historicity of The Odyssey's Polyphemus. Rabelais created a wholly "fabricated giantology" for his 16th-century Gargantua and Pantagruel. Massive bones found in 1613 in France were initially assigned to Teutobochus but the examinations of them by various physicians and their publication of diverging conclusions about the bones kicked off a "pamphlet war" between anatomists and surgeons of the day. The discovery of the so-called Claverack Giant in colonial New York triggered giantological investigations by two important early American intellectuals, Cotton Mather and Edward Taylor.

== Religion and mythology ==
=== Abrahamic ===
Genesis tells of the Nephilim before and after Noah's Flood. The word Nephilim is loosely translated as giants in some translations of the Hebrew Bible, but left untranslated in others. According to Genesis 7:23, the Nephilim were destroyed in the Flood, but Nephilim are reported after the Flood, including:

- The Anakim
- The Amorites
- The Rephaites, also known as The Emites

The Book of Numbers includes the discouraging report by the spies sent by Moses into Canaan: "We can't attack those people; they are stronger than we are. (...) All the people we saw there are of great size. We saw the Nephilim there (the descendants of Anak come from the Nephilim). We seemed like grasshoppers in our own eyes, and we looked the same to them." The Book of Joshua, describing the actual conquest of Canaan in a later generation, makes reference to such people living there in (Joshua 14:12–15 and Joshua 15:13–14).

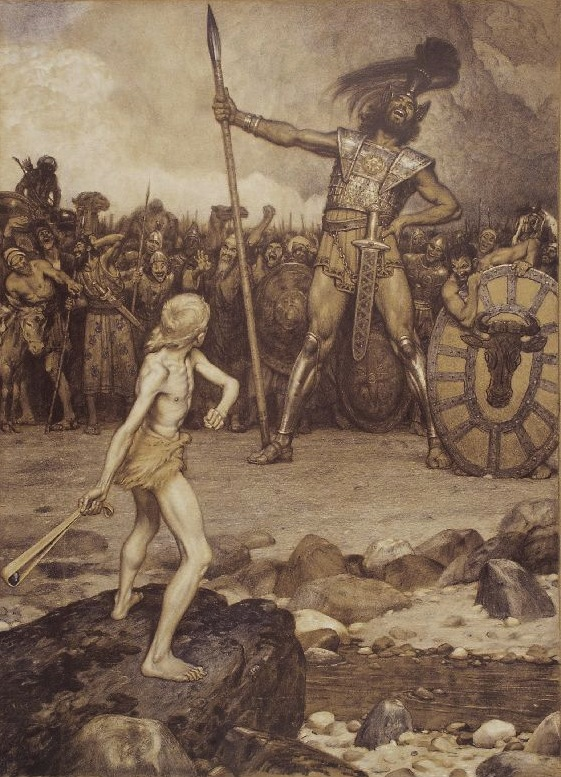
David faces Goliath in this 1888 lithograph by Osmar Schindler

The Bible also tells of Gog and Magog, who later entered European folklore, and of the famous battle between David and the Philistine Goliath. While Goliath is often portrayed as a giant in retellings of the Biblical narrative, he appears to be significantly smaller than other giants, biblical or otherwise. The Masoretic Text version of the Book of Samuel gives his height as six cubits and one span (possibly 313–372 centimetres (10 ft 3 in – 12 ft 2 in)), while the Septuagint, the 1st-century Jewish historian Flavius Josephus and the 2nd–1st-centuries BCE Dead Sea Scrolls give Goliath's height as four cubits and one span (possibly 216–258 centimetres (7 ft 1 in – 8 ft 6 in)). For comparison, the Anakites are described as making the Israelites seem like grasshoppers. See also Gibborim.

Josephus also described the Amorites as giants in his Antiquities of the Jews, circa 93 CE, indicating that some sort of fossils may have been on display at that time: "For which reason they removed their camp to Hebron; and when they had taken it, they slew all the inhabitants. There were till then left the race of giants, who had bodies so large, and countenances so entirely different from other men, that they were surprising to the sight, and terrible to the hearing. The bones of these men are still shown to this very day, unlike to any credible relations of other men."

The Book of Enoch describes giants as the offspring of Watchers and women in 7:2.

=== Armenian ===
Hayk was known as the founder of the Armenian state. Hayk was part of a race of giants who helped construct the Tower of Babel. Ancient historian Movses Khorenatsi wrote, "Hayk was handsome and personable, with curly hair, sparkling eyes and strong arms. Among the giants he was the bravest and most famous, opponent of all who raised their hand to become absolute ruler over the giants and heroes."

Mount Nemrut is known to have received its name from an Armenian tradition in which Nimrod was killed by an arrow shot by Hayk during a massive battle between two rival armies of giants to the south-east of Lake Van.

=== Aztec ===
Aztec mythology features the Quinametzin, a race of giant men created in one of the previous solar eras. They are credited with the construction of Teotihuacan.

=== Basque ===
Giants are rough but generally righteous characters of formidable strength living in the hills of the Basque Country. Giants stand for the Basque people reluctant to convert to Christianity who decide to stick to the old lifestyle and customs in the forest. Sometimes they hold the secret of ancient techniques and wisdom unknown to the Christians, like in the legend of San Martin Txiki, while their most outstanding feature is their strength. It follows that in many legends all over the Basque territory the giants are held accountable for the creation of many stone formations, hills and ages-old megalithic structures (dolmens, etc.), with similar explanations provided in different spots.

However, giants show different variants and forms, they are most frequently referred to as jentilak and mairuak, while as individuals they can be represented as Basajaun ("the lord of the forests"), Sanson (variation of the biblical Samson), Errolan (based on the Frankish army general Roland who fell dead at the Battle of Roncevaux Pass) or even Tartalo (a one-eyed giant akin to the Greek Cyclops Polyphemus).

=== Bulgarian ===
In Bulgarian mythology, giants called ispolini inhabited the Earth before modern humans. They lived in the mountains, fed on raw meat and often fought against dragons. Ispolini were afraid of blackberries which posed a danger of making the giants trip and die, so they offered sacrifices to that plant.

=== Chilean ===
There are tales of giants in the northern Chilean port town of Caldera telling of giants who play with ships moving them from one port to another. Tales of the same area also tells of giants who are able to crush humans with their feet and when laying down to sleep being so long as to reach from the mountains to the sea. In some stories the giants are black humanoids or black bulls. In southern Chile there are stories of giants said to belong to certain volcanoes such as Calbuco and Osorno.

The mythical city of Tololo Pampa in northern Chile is said to be guarded by a giant known by various names including; Pata Larga, Gigante Minero and Minero Gigante. The giant enters to the mountains to obtain riches to the princess of Tololo Pampa. If a person manages to watch the giant while he works folklore says the person will be blessed with good luck for the rest of their life.

=== Greek ===
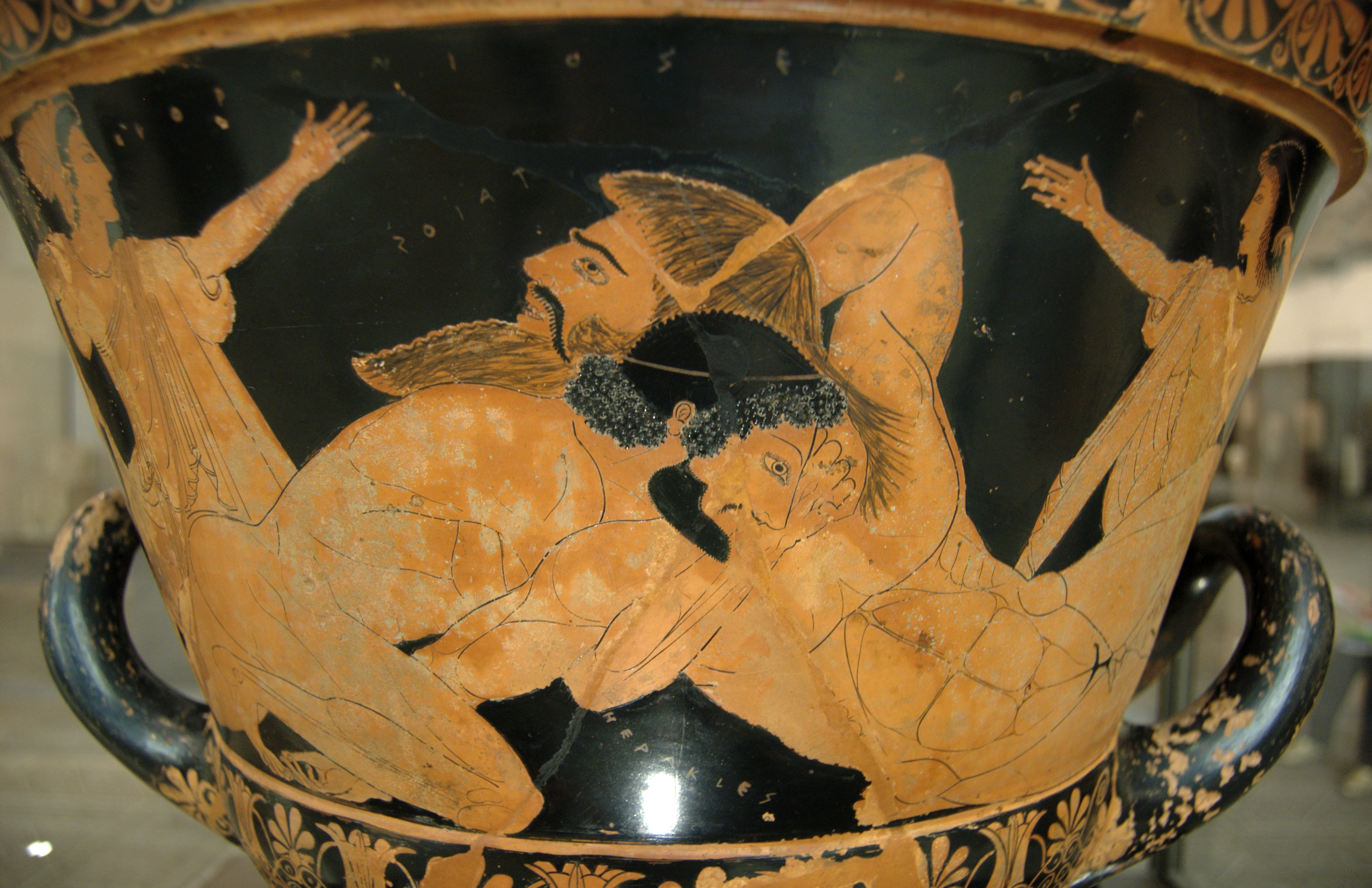
Heracles faces the giant Antaios in this illustration on a calix krater, c. 515–510 BC.

In Greek mythology, the Gigantes (γίγαντες) were (according to the poet Hesiod) the children of Uranus (Ουρανός) and Gaia (Γαία) (spirits of the sky and the earth) where some depictions had them with snake-like legs. They were involved in a conflict with the Olympian gods called the Gigantomachy (Γιγαντομαχία) when Gaia had them attack Mount Olympus. This battle was eventually settled when the hero Heracles decided to help the Olympians. The Greeks believed some of them, like Enceladus, to lie buried from that time under the earth and that their tormented quivers resulted in earthquakes and volcanic eruptions.

Herodotus in Book 1, Chapter 68, describes how the Spartans uncovered in Tegea the body of Orestes, which was seven cubits long — approximately 3.73 m, or about 12 feet 3 inches. In his book The Comparison of Romulus with Theseus, Plutarch describes how the Athenians uncovered the body of Theseus, which was "of more than ordinary size." The kneecaps of Ajax were exactly the size of a discus for the boy's pentathlon, wrote Pausanias. A boy's discus was about 12 cm (4.7 in) in diameter, while a normal adult patella is around 5 cm (2.0 in), suggesting Ajax may have been nearly 14 feet (over 4 m) tall.

The Cyclopes are also compared to giants due to their huge size (e.g. Polyphemus, son of Poseidon and Thoosa and nemesis of Odysseus in Homer's The Odyssey). The Elder Cyclopes were the children of Gaia and Uranus, and later made Zeus' "master thunderbolt", Poseidon's trident, and Hades' "helm of darkness", during the Titanomachy.

The Hecatoncheires are giants that have 100 arms and 50 heads who were also the children of Gaia and Uranus.

Other known giant races in Greek mythology include the six-armed Gegeines, the northern Hyperboreans, and the cannibalistic Laestrygonians.

=== Hindu ===
There are accounts stating humans grew to the size of giants during the Satya Yuga, the first of the four cyclical ages (yugas) in the Hindu reckoning of time.

=== Jain ===
According to Jainism, there was a time when giants walked upon this earth. Jain cosmology divides the worldly cycle of time into two parts or half-cycles, avasarpani (age of descending purity) and ascending (utsarpani).

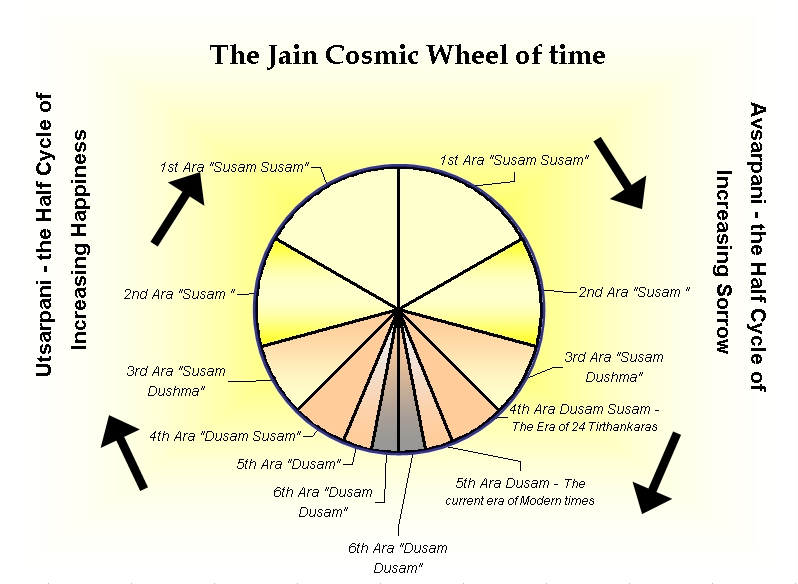
Division of time as envisaged by Jains. Human beings are said to be much taller than today in the first four aras of avasarpani and last four aras of utsarpani.

According to Jain texts, the height of Rishabhanatha, first tirthankara of the present half-cycle of time (avasarpani) was 500 dhanusa (longbow). In avasarpani, as the cycle moves ahead, height of all humans and animals decreases. The following table depicts the six aras of avasarpini–

Name of the Ara	Degree of happiness	Duration of Ara	Average height of people	Average lifespan of people
Sukhama-sukhamā	Utmost happiness and no sorrow	400 trillion sāgaropamas	Six miles tall	Three palyopama years
Sukhamā	Moderate happiness and no sorrow	300 trillion sāgaropamas	Four miles tall	Two palyopama Years
Sukhama-dukhamā	Happiness with very little sorrow	200 trillion sāgaropamas	Two miles tall	One palyopama years
Dukhama-sukhamā	Happiness with little sorrow	100 trillion sāgaropamas	1500 meters	705.6 quintillion years
Dukhamā	Sorrow with very little Happiness	21,000 years	6 feet	130 years maximum
Dukhama- dukhamā	Extreme sorrow and misery	21,000 years	2 feet	16–20 years

=== Norse ===
In Norse mythology, the jötnar (cognate with Old English: eotenas and English: ettin) are often opposed to the gods. While often translated as "giants", most are described as being roughly human-sized. Some are portrayed as huge, such as some frost giants (hrímþursar), fire giants (eldjötnar), and mountain giants (bergrisar). The jötnar are the origin of most of various monsters in Norse mythology (e.g. the Fenrisulfr) and in the eventual battle of Ragnarök, the giants will storm Asgard and fight the gods until the world is destroyed. Even so, the gods themselves were related to the jötnar by many marriages and descent; there are also jötnar such as Ægir who have good relationships with the gods and bear little difference in status to them. Odin, often regarded as the chief god, is the great-grandson of the jötunn Ymir. Norse mythology also holds that the entire world of men was created from the flesh of Ymir, a giant of cosmic proportions whose name is considered by some scholars to share a root with Yama of Indo-Iranian mythology.

Trolls are beings that are sometimes very large. The name troll is applied to jötnar.

An old Icelandic legend says that two night-prowling giants, a man and a woman, were traversing the fjord near Drangey Island with their cow when they were surprised by the bright rays of daybreak. As a result of exposure to daylight, all three were turned into stone. Drangey represents the cow and Kerling (supposedly the female giant, the name means "old hag") is to the south of it. Karl (the male giant) was to the north of the island, but he disappeared long ago.

A bergrisi – the traditional protector of southwestern Iceland – appears as a supporter on the coat of arms of Iceland.

=== Paiute ===
According to Northern Paiute oral history, the Si-Te-Cah or Sai'i are a legendary tribe of red-haired cannibalistic giants, the remains of which were allegedly found in 1911 by guano miners in Nevada's Lovelock Cave. Furthermore, the Paiute creation story tells of "beautiful giants" who once lived between the Sierra Nevadas and the Rocky Mountains. After giving birth to a disfigured child, the giants treated the child so poorly that the Great Spirit responded by making the land hot and desolate and allowing enemies to conquer the giants. Only two giants survived: Paiute and his wife, both of whose skin became brown from eternally living in the hot desert.

=== Roman ===
Several Jupiter-Giant-Columns have been found in Germania Superior. These were crowned with a statue of Jupiter, typically on horseback, defeating or trampling down a giant, often depicted as a snake. They are restricted to the area of south-western Germany, western Switzerland, French Jura, and Alsace.

=== Other European ===
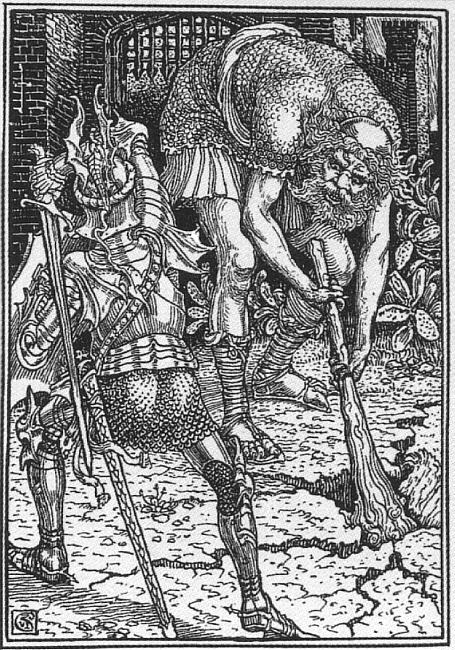
King Arthur faces a giant in this engraving by Walter Crane.

In folklore from all over Europe, giants were believed to have built the remains of previous civilizations. The Danish historian Saxo Grammaticus thought giants had a hand in the creation of megalithic monuments. Similarly, the Old English poem The Seafarer speaks of the high stone walls that were the work of giants. Natural geologic features such as the massive basalt columns of the Giant's Causeway on the coast of Northern Ireland were attributed to construction by giants.

In the Netherlands, giants are often associated with creating or forming the landscape. For instance, two giants are said to have dug a channel, until they reached the village of Akkrum, where they had an argument and each went his own way, thus splitting the channel into two separate waterways. Others threw up hills, or became hills themselves when they died on the spot. In several legends, giants were evil beings that threatened, robbed and killed travellers or locals; such as Ellert and Brammert, in the province of Drenthe.

Medieval chivalry romances such as the Spanish Amadís de Gaula feature giants as antagonists, or, rarely, as allies. This is parodied famously in Cervantes' Don Quixote, when the title character attacks a windmill, believing it to be a giant. This is the source of the phrase tilting at windmills.

Tales of combat with giants were a common feature in the folklore of the British Isles. Celtic giants also figure in Breton and Arthurian romances. In Kinloch Rannoch, a local myth has a local hill resembling a giant named as The Sleeping Giant. Folklore says the giant will awaken only if a specific musical instrument is played near the hill. Giants are also prominent in Welsh folklore.

Many giants in English folklore were noted for their stupidity. A giant named Gwendol Wrekin who had quarreled with the Mayor of Shrewsbury went to bury the city with dirt; however, he met a shoemaker, carrying shoes to repair, and the shoemaker convinced the giant that he had worn out all the shoes coming from Shrewsbury, and so it was too far to travel. This led to the giant giving up and dumping the dirt, forming two hills called The Wrekin and The Ercall. Other English stories told of how giants threw stones at each other, which was used to explain many great stones on the landscape.

Giants figure in folklore and fairy tales, such as Jack the Giant Killer, The Giant Who Had No Heart in His Body, Nix Nought Nothing, Robin Hood and the Prince of Aragon, Young Ronald, and Paul Bunyan. Ogres are humanoid creatures, sometimes of gigantic stature, that occur in various sorts of European folklore.

Rübezahl, is a kind giant from German folklore who lived in the Giant Mountains along with the Bergmönch, a giant mountain spirit.

Antero Vipunen is a giant shaman who appears in the Kalevala, meeting the epic hero Väinämöinen to teach him creation spells.

=== Yoruba ===
The legendary Yoruba warrior king, Oranmiyan, who founded the Oyo Empire is sometimes fabled to have been a giant. A 20ft tall obelisk erected in the city of Ifẹ, known as Ọpa Ọranmiyan (lit. "Staff of Ọranmiyan") is believed to have been plunged into the ground by him before his death.

== Names ==
- Amorites - Hebrew Bible
- Anakim - Hebrew Bible
- Asura - Indian religions
- Baloz - Albanian mythology
- Behemoth - Jewish mythology
- Druon Antigoon - Dutch folklore
- Brân the Blessed - Welsh mythology
- Cewri - Welsh mythology
- Cormoran - Cornish mythology
- Cyclopes - Greek mythology
- Daidarabotchi - Japanese mythology
- Daitya - Hinduism
- Fomorians - Irish mythology
- Gigantes - Greek mythology
- Gog - Hebrew Bible
- Gogmagog - Matter of Britain
- Goliath - Book of Samuel
- Humbaba - Sumerian religion
- Ispolin - Slavic paganism
- Jentil - Basque mythology
- Jötunn - Germanic mythology
- Kalevipoeg - Estonian mythology
- Mago - Korean mythology
- Majitu - Swahili people
- Nephilim - Hebrew Bible
- Og - Book of Numbers
- Ogre - European folklore
- Paul Bunyan - American folklore
- Quinametzin - Aztec mythology
- Rakshasa - Indian religions
- Rephaite - Hebrew Bible
- Rübezahl - German folklore/Czech folklore
- Si-Te-Cah - Paiute mythology
- Stallo - Sámi shamanism
- Tepegöz - Turkic mythology
- Teutobochus - Germanic mythology
- Titans - Greek mythology
- Toell the Great - Estonian mythology
- Trolls - Nordic folklore
- Uriaș - Romanian folklore
- Ysbaddaden - Welsh mythology

== Half-giant ==
Half-giants are fictional beings who have one parent that is a giant and another parent that is a different species. In most cases, a half-giant is the result of a union between a human and a giant. Often, half-giants are of normal size or slightly larger than a human. They either have abnormal or supernatural abilities, or are unusually strong and hearty.

One notable half-giant is Antaeus of Greek mythology, who is the son of the god Poseidon and the primordial entity Gaia.

In Arthurian legend, Galehaut, Guinevere, and the Green Knight were also considered half-giants.

In fantasy role-playing games, they often are a playable race (for example, half-giants in the Dark Sun setting for Dungeons & Dragons and another race of half-giants in the MMORPG Horizons: Empire of Istaria). In the game Dungeons & Dragons, half-giants are a race of enormous demi-humans who have adapted to a variety of lifestyles in the harsh terrains of Athas. The origins of the race are unclear.

Half-giants are also known from the Harry Potter series by J. K. Rowling. Rubeus Hagrid and Olympe Maxime the headmistress of Beauxbatons Academy of Magic are examples.

== See also ==
- A Book of Giants
  - Ruth Manning-Sanders
- Giantess
- Giants (esotericism)
- Ogre
- Gigantism
- List of giants in mythology and folklore
- Megafauna
- Processional giant
- Troll
- Stallo
- Processional giants and dragons in Belgium and France
- Somali mythology

== Sources ==
- Briggs, Katharine Mary (1967). The Fairies in English Tradition and Literature. University of Chicago Press, London. ISBN 0415286018.
- Childress, David Hatcher (1992). Lost Cities of North & Central America. Stelle, IL: Adventures Unlimited. ISBN 9780932813091
- Dhallapiccola, Anna (2002). Dictionary of Hindu Lore and Legend, Thames & Hudson, (ISBN 0-500-51088-1)
- Jain, Vijay K. (2015), Acarya Samantabhadra's Svayambhustotra: Adoration of The Twenty-four Tirthankara, Vikalp Printers, ISBN 9788190363976, "Non-Copyright" Alt URL
- Lyman, Robert R., Sr. (1971). Forbidden Land: Strange Events in the Black Forest. Vol. 1. Coudersport, PA: Potter Enterprise.* Dakhloul / Fakih debate, HHUMC (2013). Are Giants Just a Hoax?. Saida, Lebanon: Archive
- Schäfke, Werner (2015). ″Dwarves, Trolls, Ogres, and Giants″. In Albrecht Classen (Ed.): Handbook of medieval culture. Fundamental aspects and conditions of the European middle ages, vol. 1. Berlin: de Gruyter, pp. 347–383.
- Zimmer, Heinrich (1953), Joseph Campbell (ed.), Philosophies Of India, London: Routledge & Kegan Paul Ltd, ISBN 978-8120807396
