= Wild Fowl Decoys =

- Title page for Wild Fowl Decoys (1934)
- Author: Joel Barber
- Language: English
- Genre: Reference
- Publisher: Eugene V. Connett III, Derrydale Press
- Publication date: 1934

Wild Fowl Decoys is an art reference book by American collector Joel Barber. It was the first book that was published on decoys and decoy collecting. It was first published in 1934 by Eugene V. Connett III by the original Derrydale Press. As were almost all original Derrydale Press books, it was published as a limited edition. This first edition typically sells for thousands of dollars. A subsequent edition was published by Windward House. The book has been re-printed a number of times, notably two years after Barber's death in 1952, by Dover Books. More recently, the book has been reprinted in 1989 and 2000 by resurrections of the Derrydale Press.

This heavily illustrated book aimed to be a comprehensive guide to the carved wooden duck decoy. Used by early American waterfowl hunters, this type of decoy was promoted by the author as a form of folk art. The book is considered by art historians to be the first on the subject, and was a bible to decoy collectors throughout the 20th century. The watercolor illustrations painted by Barber for the book are in the collection of the Shelburne Museum. as is much of Barber's collection.

== See also ==
- Joel Barber
- Folk art
- Duck hunting
- Duck decoy (model)
