= The Dorset House =

Museum building in Vermont, United States

Coordinates: 44°22′36.09″N 73°13′47.91″W

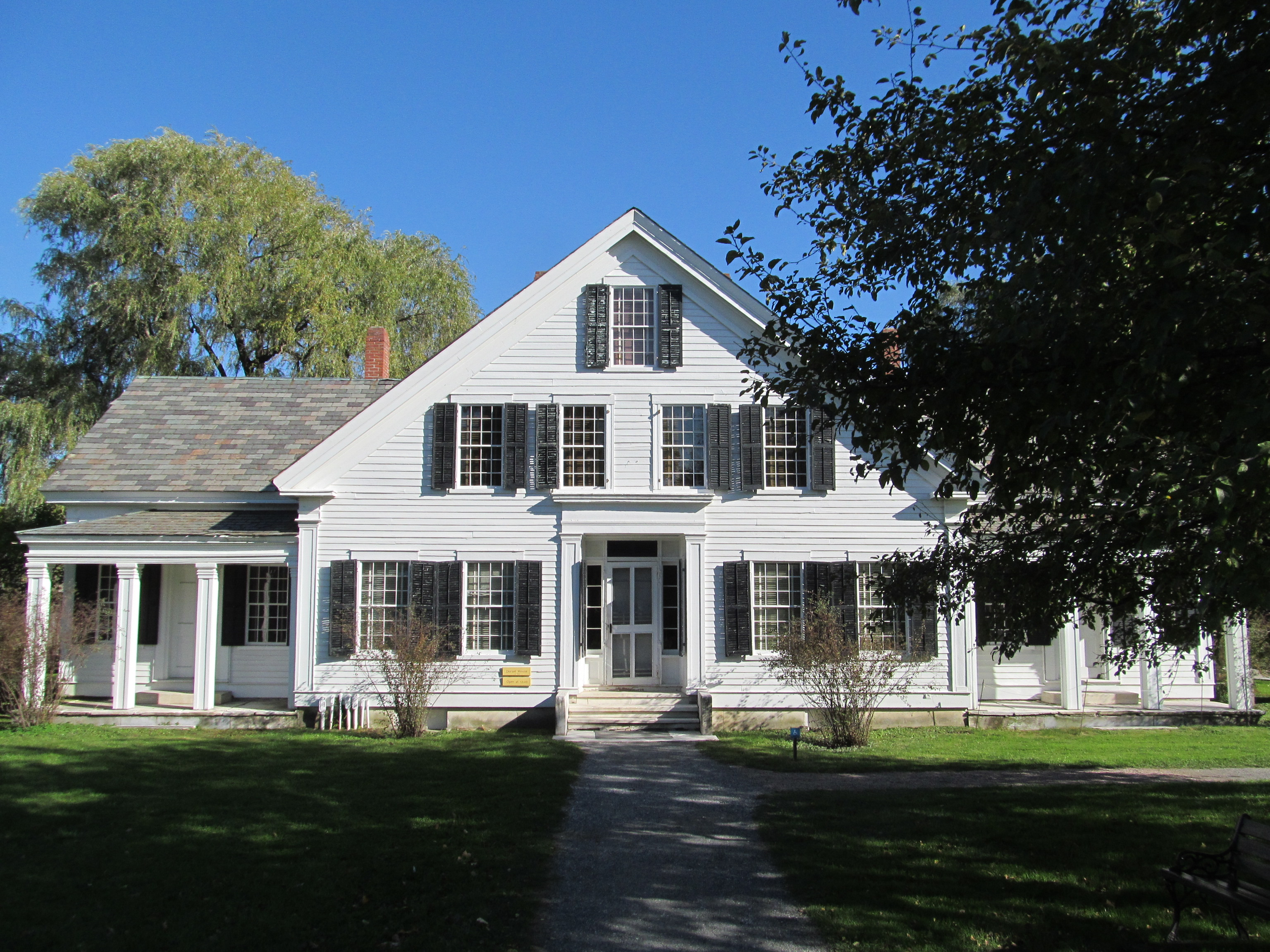
The Dorset House

The Dorset House is an exhibit building at Shelburne Museum in Shelburne, Vermont, United States; it houses the museum's collection of 900 wildfowl decoys.

In 1953, Shelburne Museum purchased Dorset House, dismantled it, and reconstructed it on the museum grounds to house the collection of decoys, punt guns, and prints of sporting scenes.

== History ==
Welcome Allen built Dorset House about 1832 in North Dorset, Vermont. Like many houses of its period, it reflects the popularity of Greek Revival architecture, which gained prominence in the United States during the second quarter of the 19th century. While classical design motifs had predominated in American architecture from the late 18th century, by the 19th century American architects began to draw inspiration specifically from Grecian temples. Often considered the first national style, Greek Revival architecture became so pervasive in the United States in part because regional architects could access the classical idiom through publications such as Stuart & Revett's Antiquities of Athens and Asher Benjamin's 1797 pattern book The Country Builder's Companion. Vernacular Greek Revival architecture developed across the United States as local builders combined classical elements with local traditions, creating distinct regional characteristics within the style.

Allen built Dorset House for his children, Florenze and Lucia. Allen's interpretation of the Greek Revival resulted in Dorset House's substantial yet unpretentious silhouette. He designed the house with mirroring wings so that his children and their families would have separate living quarters that they could access through individual doors. In combining the two cross-gabled flanking wings with the massive corniced façade, Allen achieved the classical balance and symmetry characteristic of the Greek Revival style.

Allen, and later his son Florenze, was proprietor of an iron foundry that produced stove plates, plow points, and kettles. Consequently, unlike most homes of the era, Allen designed Dorset House without open hearths and used closed iron stoves to heat the building instead.

== Decoys ==
Wildfowl decoys, made to lure game birds to within shooting range, have been used by American hunters for centuries. Native Americans originated the idea over a thousand years ago in response to the abundance of the continent's wild game. The earliest decoys made by white settlers were probably carved in the late 18th century. The idea spread rapidly, and by 1840 the wooden decoy was firmly established in American hunting traditions.

Following the American Civil War, improved transpiration systems, more advanced weapons, and abundant game combined to create what has been called the greatest wildfowl hunt in history of the world. Professional market gunners worked in most areas supplying game to meet intense public demand. Well-made decoys were among the tools most vital to their trade. To meet the needs of the market gunners and the many well-to-do sportsmen who traveled from the cities to shoot birds, scores of craftsmen turned to decoy-making full-time. Just before 1900, such firms as Mason's decoy factory of Detroit, which employed a number of carvers working from the same patterns, offered decoys by mail order. Federal conservation legislation brought the market-gunning era to an end just after World War I. However, sportsmen continued to hunt over wooden decoys until after World War II, when inexpensive molded plastic decoys took over the marketplace.

Shelburne Museum's collection of nearly nine hundred working decoys, housed in Dorset House, is the finest and most comprehensive public collection in the world. It contains superb examples by master craftsmen from all over North America, including an Elmer Crowell—whose wide variety of working decoys, decorative carvings and miniatures prove him to be the most versatile of the old-time masters—and such well-known carvers as Bill Bowman, Lee Dudley, Nathan Cobb, Lem Ward, Steve Ward, Joseph Lincoln, Albert Laing, Shang Wheeler, George Warin and John Blair. There is also a small collection of fish decoys, used by ice fishermen to lure pike, muskellunge and other predators within spearing range.

Every major hunting area in North America produced decoys. Differences in hunting methods and water conditions affected local decoy-making traditions, and dozens of regional variations developed. Exhibits in the Dorset House are arranged by region to allow easy comparison of the treatment of like species by carvers from different regions and more subtly within regions. Maine decoys, for example as seen in the work of Gus Wilson, are typically solid-bodied with wide, flat bottoms and simple paint patterns. By contrast Illinois decoys such as those made by Robert and Catherine Elliston are hollow-bodied with rounded bottoms and elaborately detailed paint. Other regional styles, including those of Louisiana, Virginia, the Chesapeake Bay, New Jersey, Long Island, Connecticut, Quebec and Ontario, are equally distinctive.

In addition to decoys, many carvers crafted miniatures and decorative birds. Elmer Crowell of Cape Cod was a pioneer in these areas. He offered his customers what he called a "songless aviary", producing miniature songbirds, shorebirds, and ducks insets of 25 species and also creating many life-sized decorative carvings of birds and fish. A wide variety of Crowell's work, including a heron used as a garden ornament, several wall-mounted flying birds and nearly a hundred miniatures, is exhibited in the Dorset House. Miniatures and decorative carvings by such other masters as Lem Ward, A.J. King and Harold Haertel are also on exhibit.

== See also ==
- Nicholas Revett
- James "Athenian" Stuart
- Joel Barber

== Bibliography ==
- Hill, Ralph Nading, and Lilian Baker Carlisle. The Story of the Shelburne Museum. 1955. ASIN: B0007F20PQ
