= Si-Te-Cah =

Native Americans purportedly from Nevada

According to reports of Northern Paiute oral history, the Si-Te-Cah, Saiduka or Sai'i (sometimes erroneously referred to as Say-do-carah or Saiekare after a term said to be used by the Si-Te-Cah to refer to another group) were a legendary tribe with whom the Northern Paiutes fought a war and eventually wiped out or drove away from the area, with the final battle having taken place at what is now known as Lovelock Cave near Lovelock, Nevada, United States. They were said to have red hair, and are sometimes described as having been cannibals. In some later versions of the legend they were giants. In 1911, a large amount of artifacts and mummified human remains were discovered under 3 to 6 feet (0.91 to 1.83 m) of guano by guano miners in Lovelock Cave.

Although the cave had been mined since 1911, miners did not notify authorities until 1912. The miners destroyed many of the artifacts, but archaeologists were still able to retrieve 10,000 Northern Paiute artifacts from the cave. Items included tule duck decoys, nets, a pair of sandals, and baskets, several dating back over 2,000 years.

== Name ==
"Si-Te-Cah" means "tule-eaters" in the Northern Paiute language. Tule or Schoenoplectus acutus is a fibrous water plant. In order to escape harassment from the Paiutes, the Si-Te-Cahs were said to have lived on rafts made of tule on Lake Humboldt.

== Oral history ==
According to archaeologists Llewellyn L. Loud and Mark Raymond Harrington, writing in 1929, the Northern Paiutes "have accounts of an extinct people living in various localities in Nevada". They expressed doubts over whether these were real historical traditions or whether, "they should be regarded as an attempt by the Northern Paiute to explain the archaeological remains of a cultural period preceding their own".

They summarize the descriptions of the Si-Te-Cah given to them by local informants thus: "Characteristics of this ancient people are that they made some of their implements differently from the Northern Paiute and of different stone materials. They had spears and no arrows, while the Northern Paiute had arrows but no spears. They were mean, contemptible, foolish, degraded cannibals, had red hair which they were excessively fond of decorating with bone ornaments, and yet were so poor that they dressed in robes made of the skin and feathers of the mud hen. In a collection of specimens from Nevada every object which is unfamiliar to a Northern Paiute is attributed to them".

Sarah Winnemucca, daughter of Paiute Chief Winnemucca, wrote in 1883 about, "a small tribe of barbarians" who ate her people, in her book Life Among the Piutes: Their Wrongs and Claims. She wrote that "after my people had killed them all, the people round us called us Say-do-carah. It means conqueror; it also means 'enemy.' My people say that the tribe we exterminated had reddish hair. I have some of their hair, which has been handed down from father to son. I have a dress which has been in our family a great many years, trimmed with the reddish hair. I am going to wear it some time when I lecture. It is called a mourning dress, and no one has such a dress but my family." She also reported hearing old women say that white people ate people, quoting one as saying "Yes, they do eat people, because they ate each other up in the mountains last winter."

Descriptions of when all this is supposed to have happened are confusing, from "many hundred years ago" (Winnemucca) to "four or five generations ago" (Winnemucca's brother, known as Natchez) to "an old Northern Paiute man recently died at Stillwater who is said to have taken part in it, and to have had one eye shot out by an arrow in one of the charges on the cave mouth" (reported by Loud and Harrington).

Some accounts describe the Si-Te-Cah as tall, or as giants, a thing not mentioned either by Winnemucca or by Loud and Harrington, who say that all their informants describe "ordinary human beings living an entirely rational human life. It is barely possible that further inquiry might bring out supernatural traits, but of all the numerous references made to them, there are no characteristics mentioned but what might well be possessed by some tribe hostile to the Northern Paiute".

== Excavations ==
A written report by James H. Hart, the first of two miners to excavate the cave in the fall of 1911, recalls that in the north-central part of the cave, about 4 feet (1.2 m) deep, "was a striking looking body of a man 6 feet 6 inches (1.98 m) tall. His body was mummified and his hair distinctly red." Unfortunately in the first year of mining, some of the human remains and artifacts were lost and destroyed. "The best specimen of the adult mummies was boiled and destroyed by a local fraternal lodge, which wanted the skeleton for initiation purposes."

Adrienne Mayor writes about the Si-Te-Cah in her book Fossil Legends of the First Americans. She suggests that the "giant" interpretation of the skeletons from Lovelock Cave and other dry caves in Nevada was started by entrepreneurs setting up tourist displays and that the skeletons themselves were of normal size. However, about a 100 miles (160 km) north of Lovelock there are plentiful fossils of mammoths and cave bears, and their large limbed bones could be thought to be those of giants by an untrained observer. She also discusses the reddish hair, pointing out that hair pigment is not stable after death and that various factors such as temperature, soil, etc. can turn ancient very dark hair rusty red or orange. Another explanation for the "giant" interpretation of the skeletons may also come from the fact that the body of the 6 feet 6 inches (1.98 m) man was described by Hart as "a giant" in comparison to the much smaller apparently female skeletons.
