= Duck decoy (model) =

Man-made object resembling a real duck

A duck decoy (or decoy duck) is a man-made object resembling a duck. Duck decoys are typically used in waterfowl hunting to attract real ducks, but they are also used as collectible art pieces. Duck decoys were historically carved from wood, often Atlantic white cedar wood on the east coast of the United States, or cork. Modern ones may also be made of canvas and plastic. They are often painted to resemble various kinds of waterfowl.

== History ==
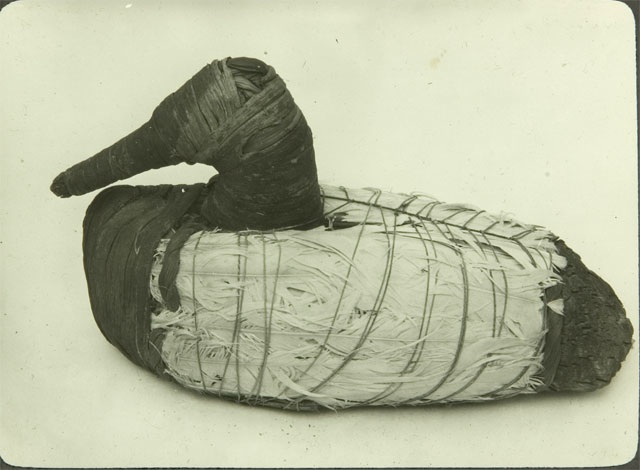
A prehistoric duck decoy found by archaeologists in Lovelock Cave in Nevada

The earliest known use of duck decoys was by ancient Egyptians, who used decoys made of clay on the Nile to hunt ducks and geese around 2500 BCE. Decoy ducks have been used in traditional hunting by Indigenous Australian peoples of the Murray River in South Australia. Native American people have been crafting and using duck decoys for thousands of years. Archaeologists discovered several decoys made from tule plants and duck feathers, dating to about 300–100 BCE in Lovelock Cave near Lovelock, Nevada. Many modern tribes have traditions of decoy crafting. Cree people traditionally make goose decoys out of tamarack twigs.

Wooden carved decoys arose in North America in the 19th and 20th centuries. After World War II, manufacturers began to make decoys out of papier-mâché and eventually plastic, and battery-powered moving decoys gained popularity in the 1990s.

== Use in hunting ==
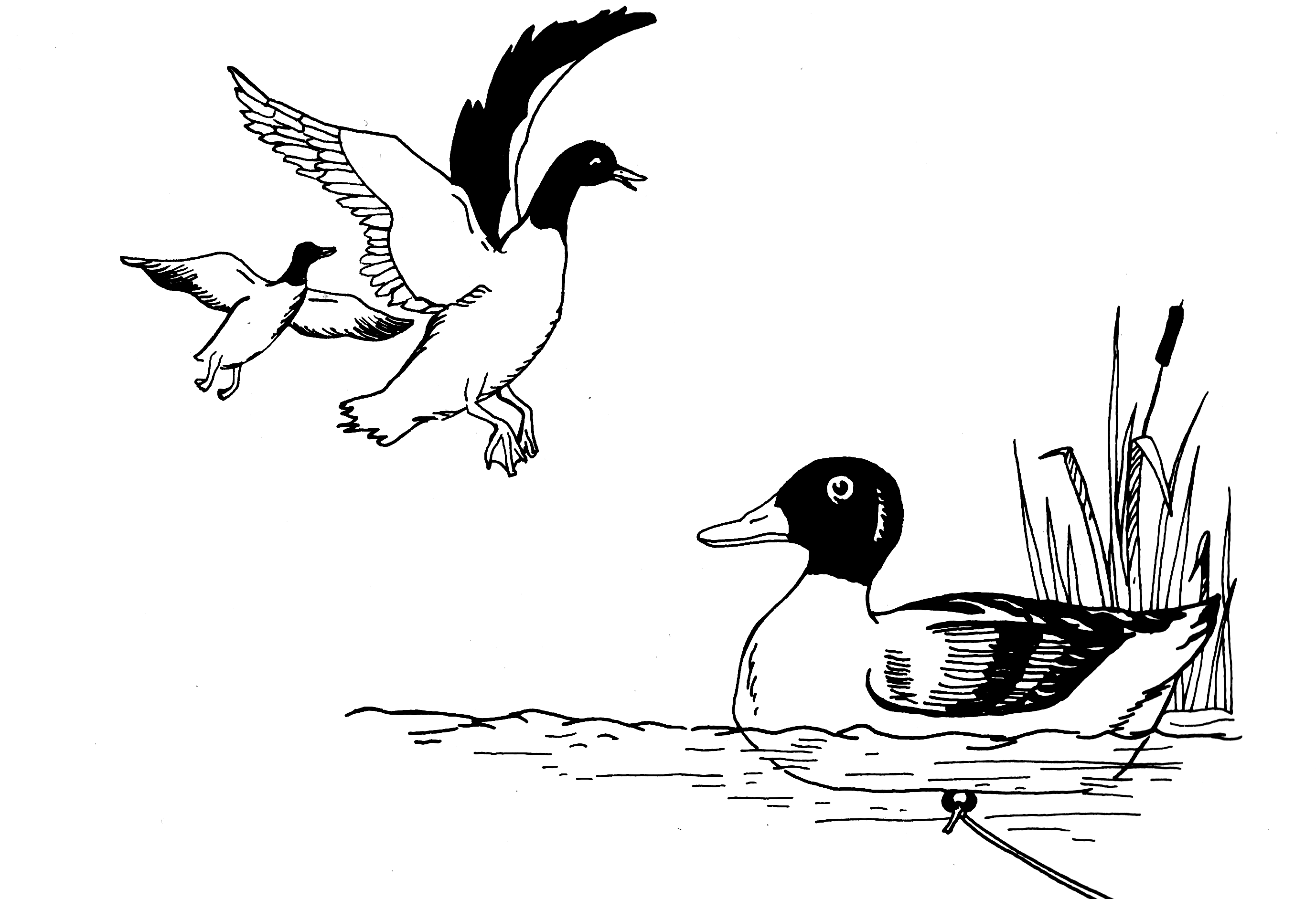
An illustration of a duck decoy attracting real ducks

Decoys are used in duck hunting to attract wild ducks to an area of water by giving the impression that other ducks are comfortably resting in the area, creating a false sense of safety in numbers. Decoys are made in different forms designed to mimic different activities of ducks, including "feeders" and "sleepers". Decoys are weighted to keep them anchored in place when floating.

Duck decoys may be colored to have a natural appearance, or they may be entirely black, as black decoys are more easily visible to passing ducks on overcast days. Hunters may also use decoys of different types of waterfowl such as coots and geese. In goose hunting, two-dimensional images of geese similar to standees are occasionally used because they are less expensive and less bulky than three-dimensional decoys.

Some modern decoys use electric batteries to move, which creates waves in the water, adding a sense of realism that may fool ducks better. One of the most popular forms of motion decoys is one that has spinning wings, creating the illusion of a duck flapping wings. Hunters may also create the illusion of movement without battery-powered decoys by using jerk-rigs, which are tethered with bungee cord and allow hunters to move decoys manually while inside their hunting blind.

== As collectible art ==
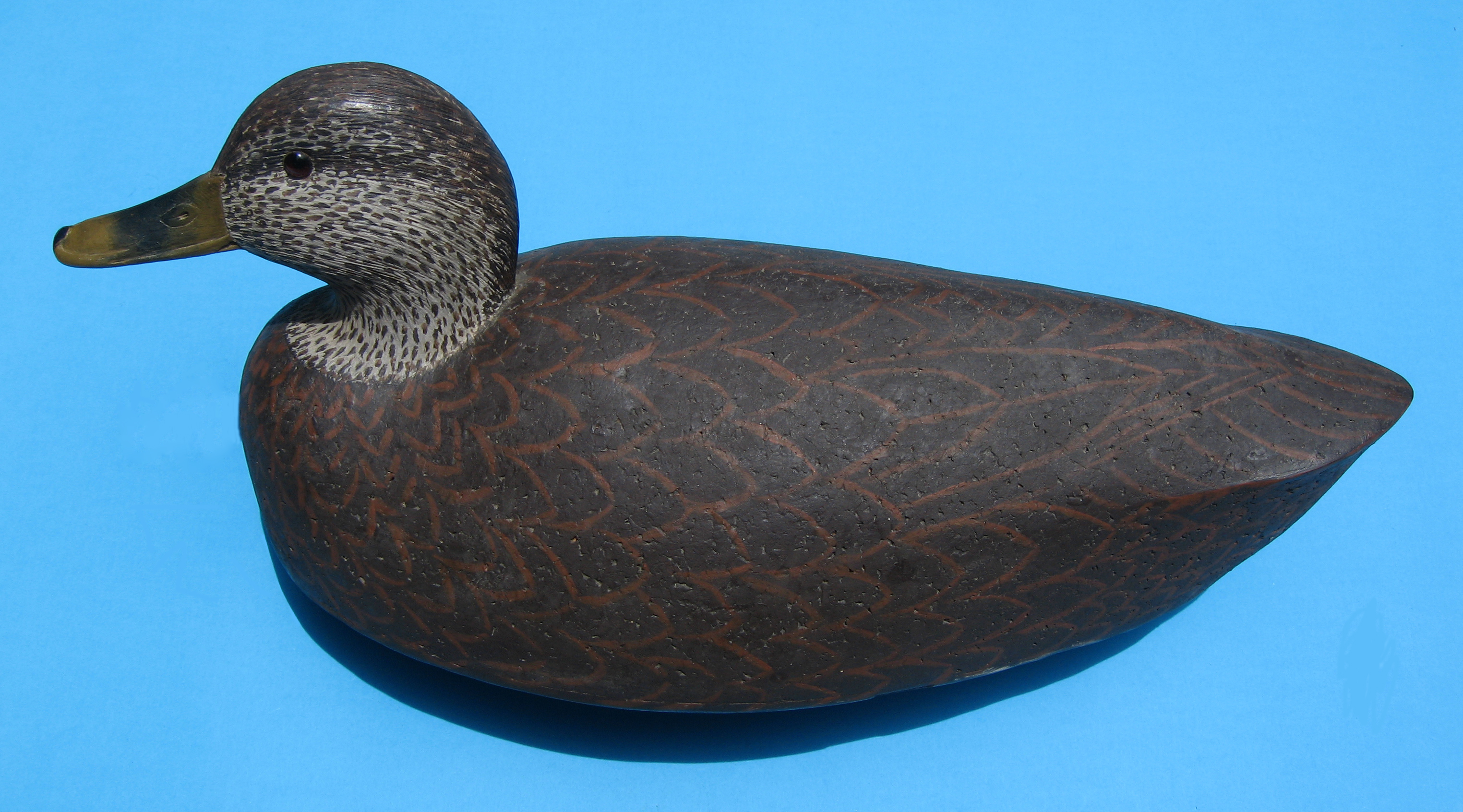
A duck decoy created by Delbert Daisey

Ever since Joel Barber, the first known decoy collector, started in 1918, decoys have become increasingly viewed as an important form of North American folk art. Barber's book Wild Fowl Decoys was the first book on decoys as collectible objects. It was followed in 1965 by folk art dealer Adele Earnest's The Art of the Decoy and American Bird Decoys by collector Wm. F. Mackey. Collectors typically focus on particular categories of decoys, such as working, decorative, antique, or contemporary. In addition, collectors may focus on decoys from particular regions such as eastern North America, Louisiana, California, or the Upper Mississippi Flyway, which all have unique decoy-carving traditions.

In 2007, a red-breasted merganser hen decoy created by Lothrop Holmes sold at auction for $856,000. At the time, it was one of the highest prices ever paid for a duck decoy. The first million-dollar price was achieved when two decoys (a Canada goose decoy and a preening Northern pintail drake decoy) created by A. Elmer Crowell were sold for $1.13 million each in a private sale in September 2007.

== See also ==
- Fish decoy
