= Ispolin =

Giant in Bulgarian mythology

The ispolin (Bulgarian: исполин [ispoˈlin], plural исполини ispolini) is a legendary giant in Bulgarian mythology. While the appearance of the ispolin varied according to the myth and region, ispolini were believed to have inhabited the Earth before humans and to have been considerably taller.

== Etymology ==
Ispolin with the meaning of "giant" appears in Rus' Old Church Slavonic texts as early as the 11th century. Russian linguist Max Vasmer believes the word's etymology is tied to spali, a name for the defeated Goths inhabiting what is today southern Russia. The word appears as Spalaei in 1st-century Ancient Roman author Pliny the Elder's Natural History.

== Origin and appearance ==
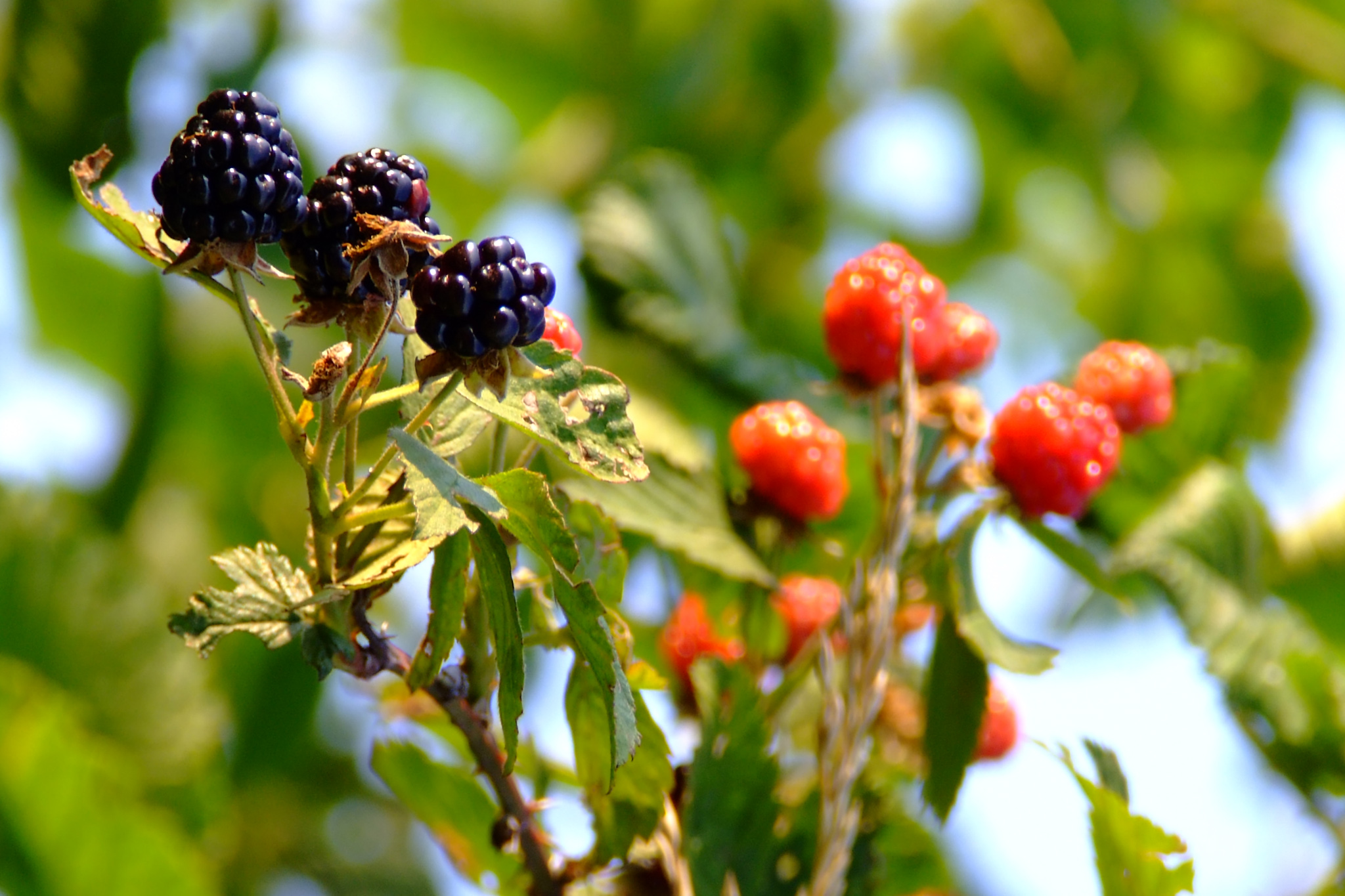
According to Bulgarian mythology, blackberry bushes posed the greatest threat to ispolini, who would trip in their thorns and die

Bulgarian founding myths refer to the ispolini as the second out of three generations of people to inhabit the Earth, the third generation being modern humans. The first people that God created were dwarves or little people, i.e. dzhudzheta (джуджета, singular джудже dzhudzhe). However, because of their low stature these people were unable to protect themselves from wild animals or to effectively cultivate the land, and thus they died out.

Dwarves were succeeded by ispolini, whom Bulgarians believed God created as the opposite of dwarves. Various myths describe them as up to 3 metres (9.8 ft) tall and having huge heads, while other legends portray ispolini as possessing three heads and a single eye, the size of an egg, on their forehead, or a single leg. In some aspects, the ispolin bears a resemblance to the cyclops of ancient Greek mythology. Besides their height, ispolini also possessed supernatural powers.

Ispolini were believed to have inhabited the prehistoric mountains. Their voices were thought so powerful that they were able to communicate between each other even when they were standing on far-away mountain tops. Ispolini lived in caves and were carnivorous, feeding exclusively on raw meat. They were regarded as a natural enemy of dragons (змейове zmeyove) and would often engage them in battle.

Despite their physical strength and stature, ispolini were not invulnerable. Bulgarian legends claim that the most dangerous object for an ispolin was the blackberry bush. Due to their height and sluggishness, ispolini were unable to spot or avoid blackberry bushes, so they would trip, get caught in the thorns and perish. Perceiving the blackberry as a great and powerful danger, ispolini were believed to offer sacrifices (курбан kurban) to the blackberry in order to propitiate it.

However, the legend goes, God destroyed ispolini because he judged that they were, just like dwarves, not suited for life on Earth. In many regions of Bulgaria, large heaps of stones, often ruins of ancient buildings, are interpreted as ispolin graveyards. It was common practice that when a person passed such an area, they would throw a stone as a form of denouncement (anathema).

Because ispolini and thus their "graveyards" were also known under the names елини elini ("Hellenes"), латини latini ("Latins") and жидове zhidove ("Jews"), such heaps are attributed to the pre-Christian civilizations that inhabited the Balkans. Ruins that were commonly tied to the mythological ispolini could be found near Samokov, Veliko Tarnovo, Malko Tarnovo and Ihtiman. Bulgarian scholars interpret the association of Latins and Greeks with legendary ancient giants as a result of the wars that medieval Bulgaria waged against these people. Humans who were often forced to wage war were thought to be inherently strong and bulky.

== Various ispolini ==
A large number of characters or groups were described as "ispolini", depending on the region of Bulgaria.

Latin transliteration	Cyrillic original	Meaning
elini	елини	Hellenes
latini	латини	Latins
zhidove	жидове	Jews
zhidavtsi	жидавци	from zhidove, see above
kapinchovtsi	къпинчовци	blackberry people
kaloyantsi	калоянци	
pesoglavtsi	песоглавци	dog-headed people
tsoglavtsi	цоглавци	
tsologlavtsi	цологлавци	
bugantsi	буганци	
