= Lovelock Cave =

Cave in United States of America

- Bat Cave, Horseshoe Cave, Sunset Guano Cave, Indian Cave
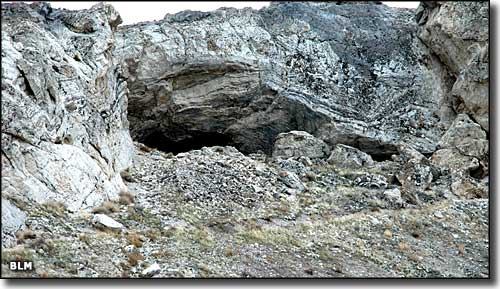

- Location within Nevada
- Coordinates: Approx. 39°57′45″N 118°33′30″W
- Depth: 40 ft (12 m)
- Length: 160 ft (49 m)
- Discovery: 1911, 1912
- Geology: Limestone
- Entrances: 2
- Difficulty: Easy
- Hazards: Narrow entrance
- Access: Public
- Cave survey: 1912
- Lovelock Cave
- U.S. National Register of Historic Places
- Location: Address Restricted; Churchill County, Nevada
- Nearest city: Lovelock, Nevada
- NRHP reference No.: 84002073
- Added to NRHP: May 24, 1984

Lovelock Cave (NV-Ch-18) is an archaeological site located near Lovelock in rural Churchill County, Nevada, United States. It has previously been known as Sunset Guano Cave, Horseshoe Cave, and Loud Site 18. The cave is about 150 feet (46 m) long and 35 feet (11 m) wide. Lovelock Cave is one of the most important classic sites in the Great Basin region because the cave's conditions preserve organic and inorganic material. The cave was placed on the National Register of Historic Places on May 24, 1984. It was the first major cave in the Great Basin to be excavated, and the Lovelock Cave people are part of the University of California Archaeological Community's Lovelock Cave Station.

== History ==
The large rock shelter is north of modern-day Humboldt Sink, next to the former lakebed of Lake Lahontan. Lake Lahontan was a large Pleistocene-era pluvial lake that covered much of western Nevada. Initially a rock shelter, the lake's currents and wave action carved it into a cave. Eventually, an earthquake collapsed the mouth's overhang. The drier Holocene climate lowered the water level, creating several smaller lakes, such as Lake Humboldt, Pyramid Lake, and Carson Lake. The cave's dry environment preserved a wealth of artifacts from earlier inhabitants, spanning over 4,000 years of occupation. Lovelock Cave was in use as early as 2580 BC but was not intensively inhabited until around 1000 BC. The earliest discoveries of artifacts and excavations in the early 20th century were not very well executed, which resulted in a loss of archaeological information; more recent investigations were more careful and meticulous.

== Earliest discovery of artifacts ==
In 1911, two miners, David Pugh and James Hart, were hired to mine bat guano from the cave for use as fertilizer. They removed a layer of guano estimated to be 3 to 6 feet (0.91 to 1.83 m) deep and weighing about 250 tons. Heizer and Napton's review of the excavation states “[the guano] was dug up from the upper cave deposits, screened on the hillside outside the cave, and shipped to a fertilizer company in San Francisco.” Miners had dumped the top layers of Lovelock into a heap outside of the cave. The miners were aware of the artifacts, but they saved only the specimens they deemed most interesting. The first exploration was unsystematic, and large portions of the cave lost material and suffered considerable damage to the site strata. The mining company contacted L.L. Loud of the Anthropology Department at the University of California when the refuse left by the ancient people proved so plentiful that they could no longer collect fertilizer.

== First archaeological investigation ==
In spring 1912, Alfred Kroeber sent Loud, an employee of the Museum of Anthropology, University of California, to recover any materials left from the previous year's guano mining. Loud excavated Lovelock Cave for five months and reportedly collected roughly 10,000 material remains. The majority of the archaeological record came from three areas: a dump outside the cave left by miners, lower-level deposits from the cave's northwest end, and undisturbed refuse along the cave's outlying edges. Loud did not keep a comprehensive excavation report, so detailed information is unavailable. Archaeological excavation methods and procedures have improved over the years, and Loud's excavation does not meet today's standards. He labeled the 41 individual dig locations as "lots" without establishing any grid system, which are used to determine the origin and depth of the archaeological record.

== Later excavations ==
Twelve years after the first excavation, Loud returned to Lovelock Cave with Mark Raymond Harrington in the summer of 1924. The Museum of the American Indian, Heye Foundation, New York commissioned Harrington and Loud, who, with help from local Paiute Indians, tried to recover any materials left by earlier investigations. They found fragments that collectors in the east end and center of the cave had ignored. The team also dug to the base of the deposits in the west end. This excavation resulted in the discovery of the famous duck decoy cache.

The American Museum of Natural History sponsored Nels C. Nelson to conduct a surface collection of Lovelock Cave in 1936. However, the museum did not admit any recovered archaeological material into its collection.

Robert Heizer came to Lovelock Cave in 1949 to collect organic material for radiocarbon dating. He returned in 1950 and 1965 with a field group to sift through remains the miners left on a slope in front of the cave and collect coprolites. During excavations with Lewis Napton in 1968 and 1969, they discovered disturbed human remains. The remains found were so scattered that a complete recovery was never possible. Human coprolites found at Lovelock Cave are instrumental in piecing together the cultures’ subsistence patterns, specifically the kinds of food the inhabitants were eating: primarily birds, fish, and other fauna that lived near the lake, as well as vegetation which was collected and stored for winter months. Furthermore, because coprolites are organic material, they can be dated using radiocarbon dating.

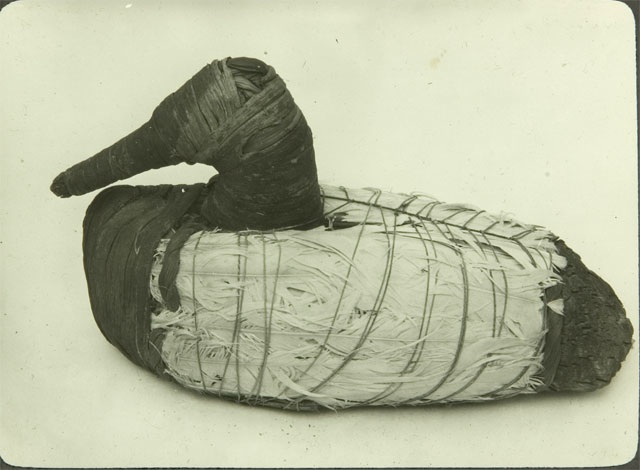
One of the duck decoys found in Lovelock Cave.

=== Duck decoys ===
The most renowned discovery at Lovelock Cave was a cache of eleven duck decoys found in Pit 12, Lot 4, when Harrington and Loud dug for the Museum of the American Indian in 1924. The cache included eight painted and feathered decoys and three unfinished decoys. The same pit also contained feathers and two bundles of animal traps. The remarkable decoys were made from bundled tule, a long, grass-like herb, and were covered in feathers and painted.

The first attempt to date the decoys with radiocarbon dating techniques in 1969 was unsuccessful because the material was lost. Later samples could not be acquired without extensively damaging the decoys, so researchers did not date them until the development of accelerator mass spectrometry (AMS). Technological advances in AMS dating meant that much smaller, milligram-sized specimens from archaeological material were sufficient for dating. Researchers retrieved samples from two duck decoys, and A. J. T. Tull of the University of Arizona, Tucson dated the specimens in 1984. Duck Decoy 13/4513 dated to 130 BC (± 330), and Duck Decoy 13/4512B dated to 300 BC (± 230).

=== Prehistoric sling ===
A hand-woven textile sling was collected by Loud in 1912, but it was not reported or studied extensively until years later. Archaeologists value the specimen because it is recognized as one of the earliest slings in North America. The Northern Paiute (Paviotso) occupied the area during historic times, and they recognized the sling as a toy or used it for hunting and war. Slings served different purposes, such as a toy, a forehead band, or a mechanism for hunting birds. The sling found at Lovelock was constructed using a simple knotting technique from two-ply yarn, likely made from various available fibers. The pattern on the sling is reversible. The sling found at Lovelock is just one of the many handmade textile items from the cave. Hunters also crafted traps and nets to help them find food. Baskets and other food storage items were used to ensure that during times of resource scarcity, everyone would have enough food for survival.

=== Dating ===
Archaeologists excavated the eight burials at Lovelock Cave at various times between 2500 BC and 1100 AD. These burials do not appear to be similar to the earlier burials from Spirit Cave or to the later burials from Stillwater Marsh.

Similar, approximately contemporaneous Elephant Mountain Cave bundle burials also occur in the Black Rock Desert north of Lovelock. The site was extensively looted, making it difficult to study. A pair of sandals from the cave has been radiocarbon dated to 10,000 years ago, making them the oldest footwear ever found in Nevada and among the oldest in the world.

The cave's last use is believed to be in the mid-1800s, as indicated by a gun cache and a human coprolite. Radiocarbon dating dated the material to about 1850.

== Life at Lovelock Cave ==
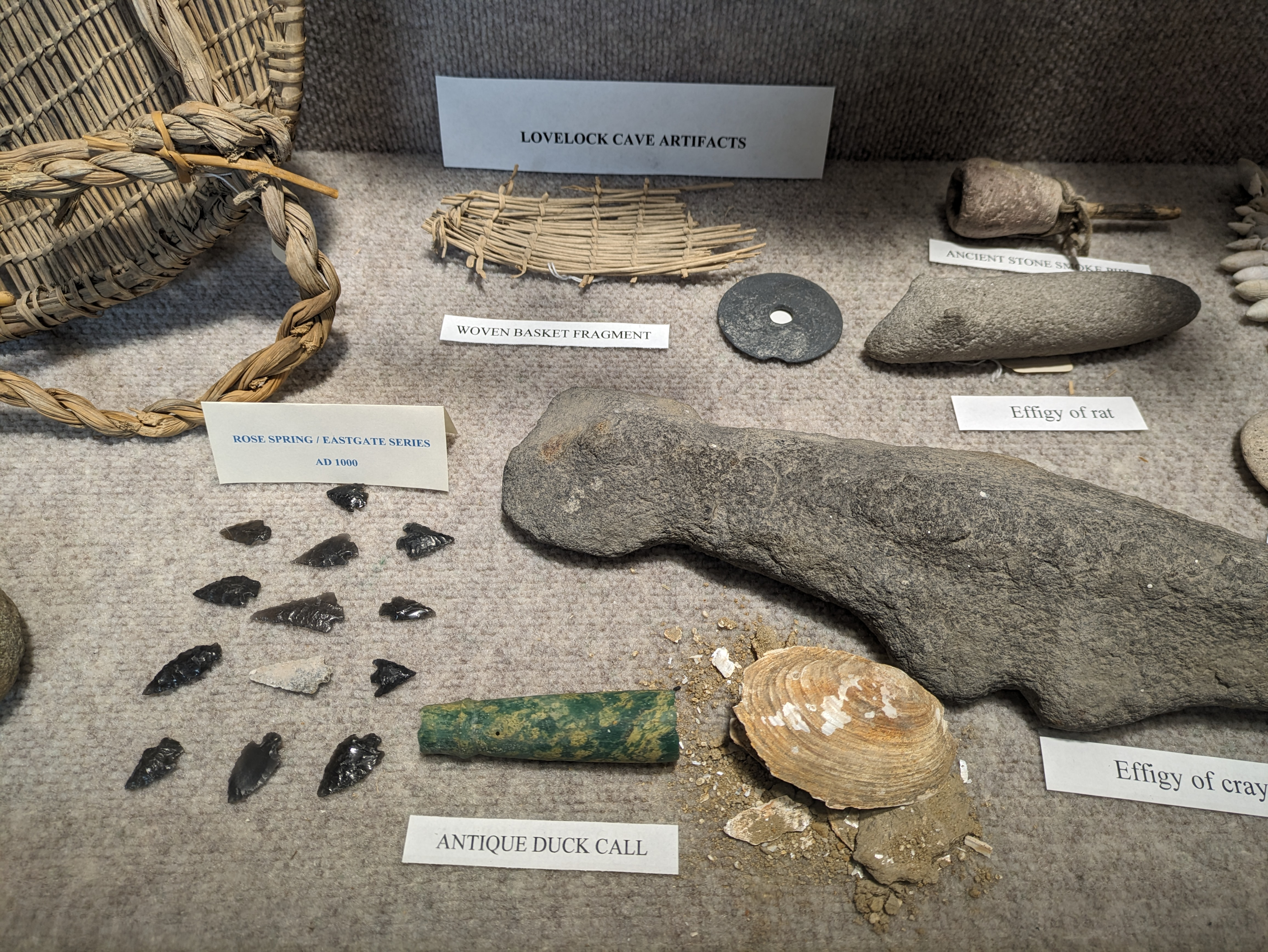
Artifacts from Lovelock Cave

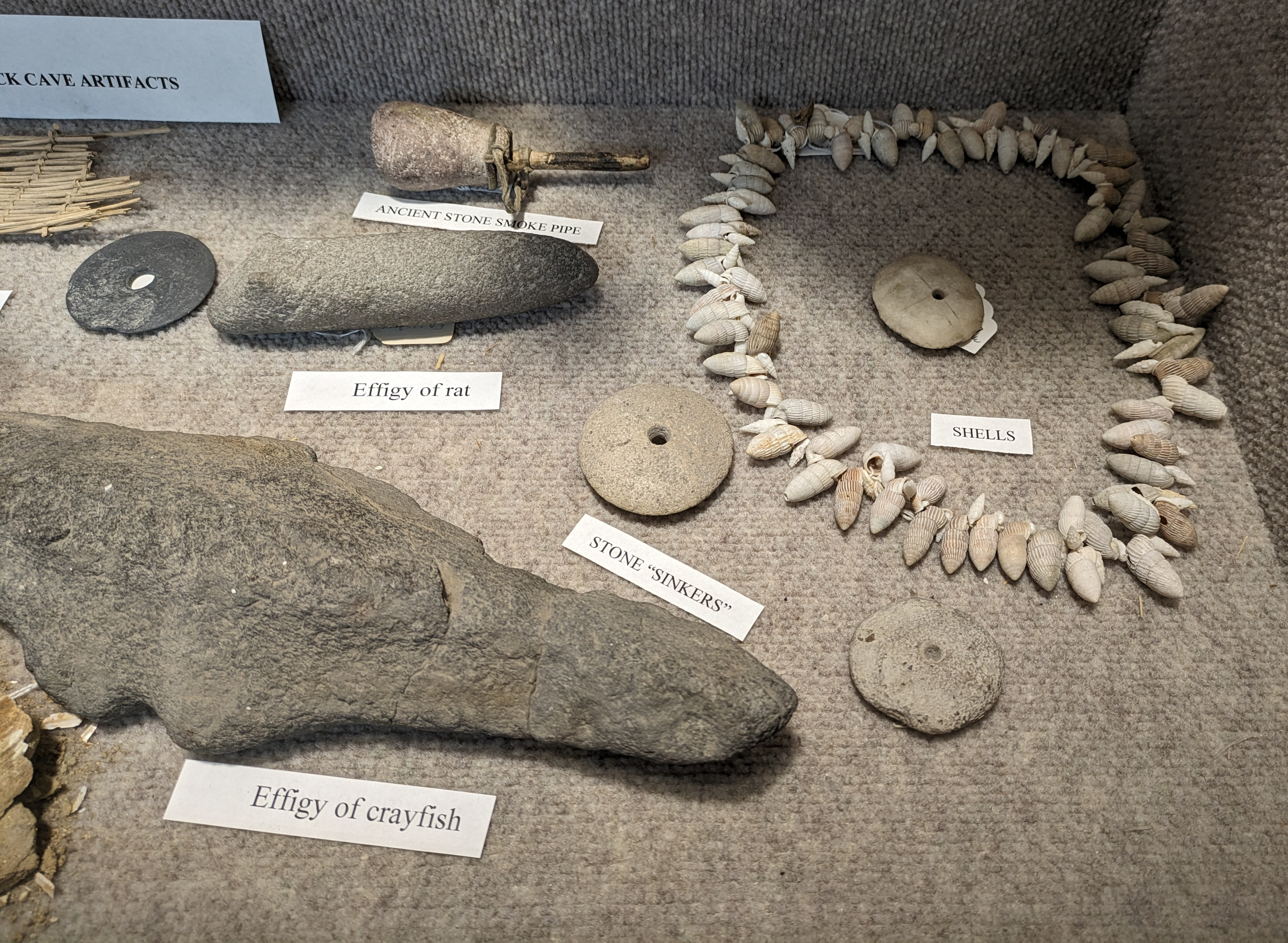
Artifacts from Lovelock Cave

Humans used the cave starting around 2500 BC, but it was not intensively used until 1000 BC. Two competing hypotheses arose from the investigations of Lovelock Cave. Heizer and Napton supported a limnosedentary theory pertaining to life at the site. This view held that people in the area rarely moved from their base because they had access to such rich, varied resources. This theory is based on the coprolitic material found at Lovelock which revealed a primary diet of fish and diverse lakeside fare. By contrast, a limnomobile view suggests that people in the area were highly mobile and that sites such as Lovelock were occupied only at certain times throughout the year. Lovelock Cave is believed to have been occupied extensively during the winter months. Summer months may have been plagued by insects, such as mosquitoes, that made life near a marsh undesirable. The site's findings reveal long periods of occupation and the complex techniques hunters and gatherers used to acquire resources.

Lovelock Cave overlooks Humboldt Sink, a remnant of Lake Lahontan. Human coprolites recovered from Lovelock Cave show that 90 percent of their diet came from Humboldt Sink. They ate fish of all sizes, and hunting techniques included nets, traps, and fishbone hooks. Dietary staples included Lahontan cutthroat trout, ducks, and mudhens. Plants such as bulrush, cattail, and other grasses were also significant food sources. The Great Basin environment is highly diverse, and rainfall varies year to year. A wet year can produce up to six times as much vegetation as a dry year. Hunter-gatherers of the Great Basin survived on a wide variety of resources to adapt to a changing environment. The inhabitants of Lovelock Cave were fortunate to live near a rich lowland marsh, as duck and goose decoys were ideal for hunting there.

Subsistence patterns and adaptations varied greatly among Great Basin groups. People living in mountainous areas survived on plants for more than 50 percent of their diet, whereas people around water or in marshes hunted fish and other wetland wildlife. Waterfowl have been attracted to Great Basin marshes for thousands of years. Ancient hunter-gatherers at Lovelock Cave became expert bird hunters. They used their well-designed duck decoys to lure prey, then shoot birds from blinds. As hunters became more experienced, they wore disguises made from reeds or duck skin, stalked birds, and then surprised and grabbed them by the legs. The people at Lovelock recognized the importance of waterfowl and used birds extensively. Archaeological specimens from the site show that inhabitants collected feathers from geese, ducks, pelicans, and herons and used them to create decoys that helped them capture more birds. Local native people still use decoys today when hunting waterfowl.

Hunters also relied on a variety of fauna, such as muskrat, rabbit, and rodents. Gatherers harvested vegetables and grasses in spring and fall to supplement their rich diet. The women of the group likely gathered and also crafted important items to make life easier in the marsh. They used fibers from dogbane and milkweed to make yarn and baskets. They used baskets to store food, especially vegetation harvested in the spring and fall and saved for the winter months. Women would occasionally collect fish with smaller baskets.

The ideal conditions at Lovelock Cave preserved deposits of feathers from various birds and textiles from nets. Common fibrous items include nets, baskets, sandals, traps, and decoys. Manos and metates, hand-held grinding stones, were widely used by Native people; they helped process plant foods, especially seeds, nuts, and other tough materials. The materials recovered from Lovelock Cave show that hunting and gathering were the primary means of survival for Native Americans of the Great Basin for thousands of years. The diversity of resources allowed the people in the area to thrive using traditional methods for a long period of time, and their material culture remained the same for thousands of years.

== Si-Te-Cah ==
According to Paiute oral history, the Si-Te-Cah, or Sai'i, were a legendary tribe of red-haired, cannibalistic giants. Mummified remains of a man 6 feet 6 inches (1.98 m) tall were allegedly discovered according to accounts of guano miners in Lovelock Cave in 1911, but no proof of this mummy's existence has been found. Adrienne Mayor suggests that the 'giant' interpretation of the skeletons from Lovelock Cave and other dry caves in Nevada was started by entrepreneurs setting up tourist displays and that the skeletons themselves were of normal size. About 100 miles (160 km) north of Lovelock, plentiful mammoth and cave bear fossils exist, and an untrained observer could easily mistake their large limb bones for those of giants. She also discusses the reddish hair, pointing out that hair pigment is not stable after death and that various factors such as temperature and soil can turn ancient, very dark hair into a rusty-red color.
