= Refuge Waterfowl Museum =

Coordinates: 37.924656°N 75.353712°W

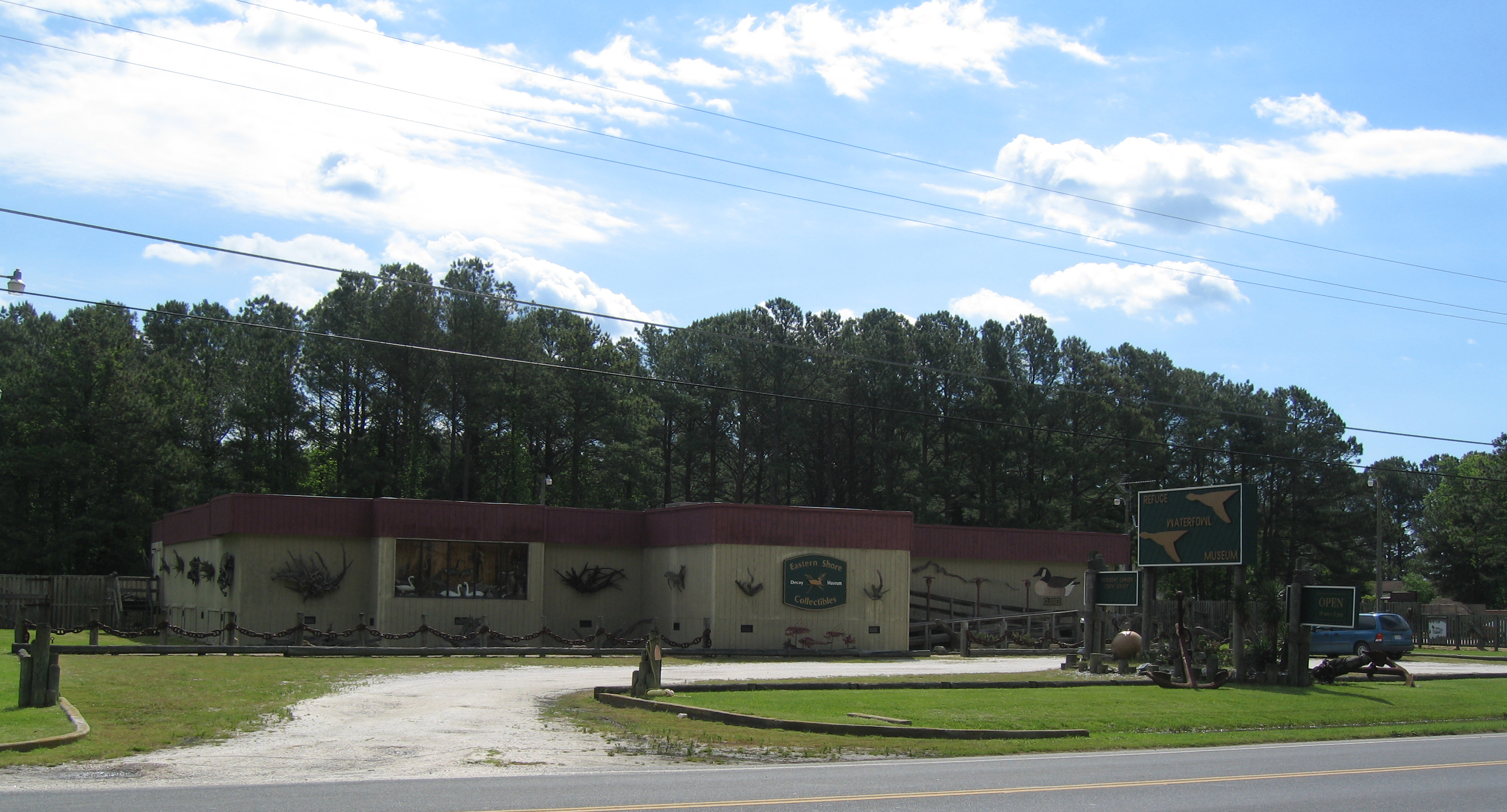
- Established: 1978
- Location: 7059 Maddox Boulevard; Chincoteague, Virginia
- Type: Art

The Refuge Waterfowl Museum was located at 7059 Maddox Boulevard, Chincoteague, Virginia, United States. The museum contained an extensive collection of wildfowl wood carvings by renowned decoy crafters. The museum also exhibited murals, wildlife paintings and skipjack models. The museum claimed "Cigar" Daisy as its resident carver. The Museum's exhibits also included Antique boats, guns, traps, a restored hunting buggy, and a replica of a carver’s shop were among the attractions.

After the death of its owner, on May 4, 2013, the museum announced that it will close and sell its assets.
