= Delbert Daisey =

American sculptor

Cigar Daisey
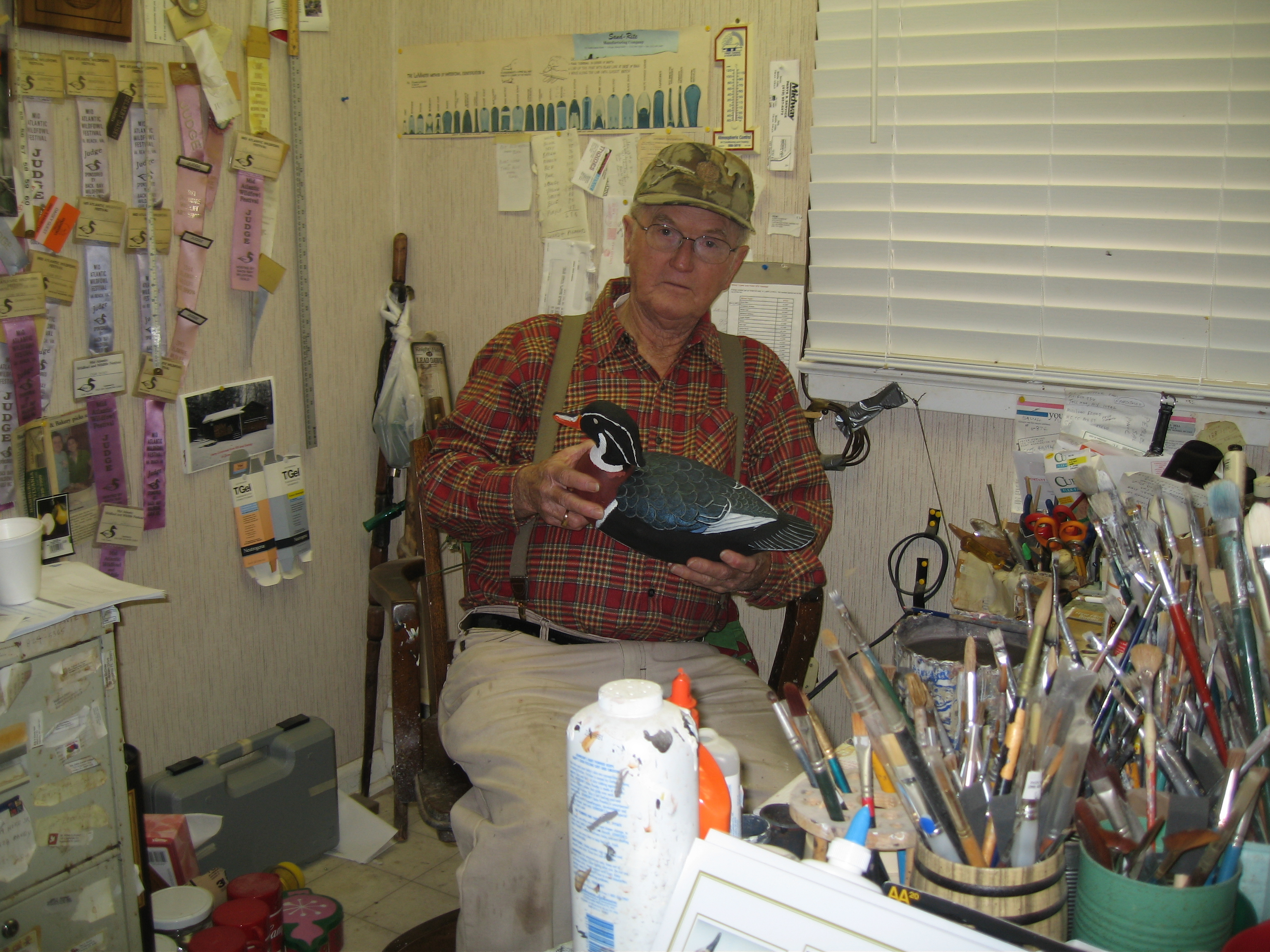
- Born: March 6, 1928; Chincoteague, Virginia, U.S.
- Died: April 19, 2017 (aged 89); Chincoteague, Virginia, U.S.
- Known for: Wood carver, Decoy maker

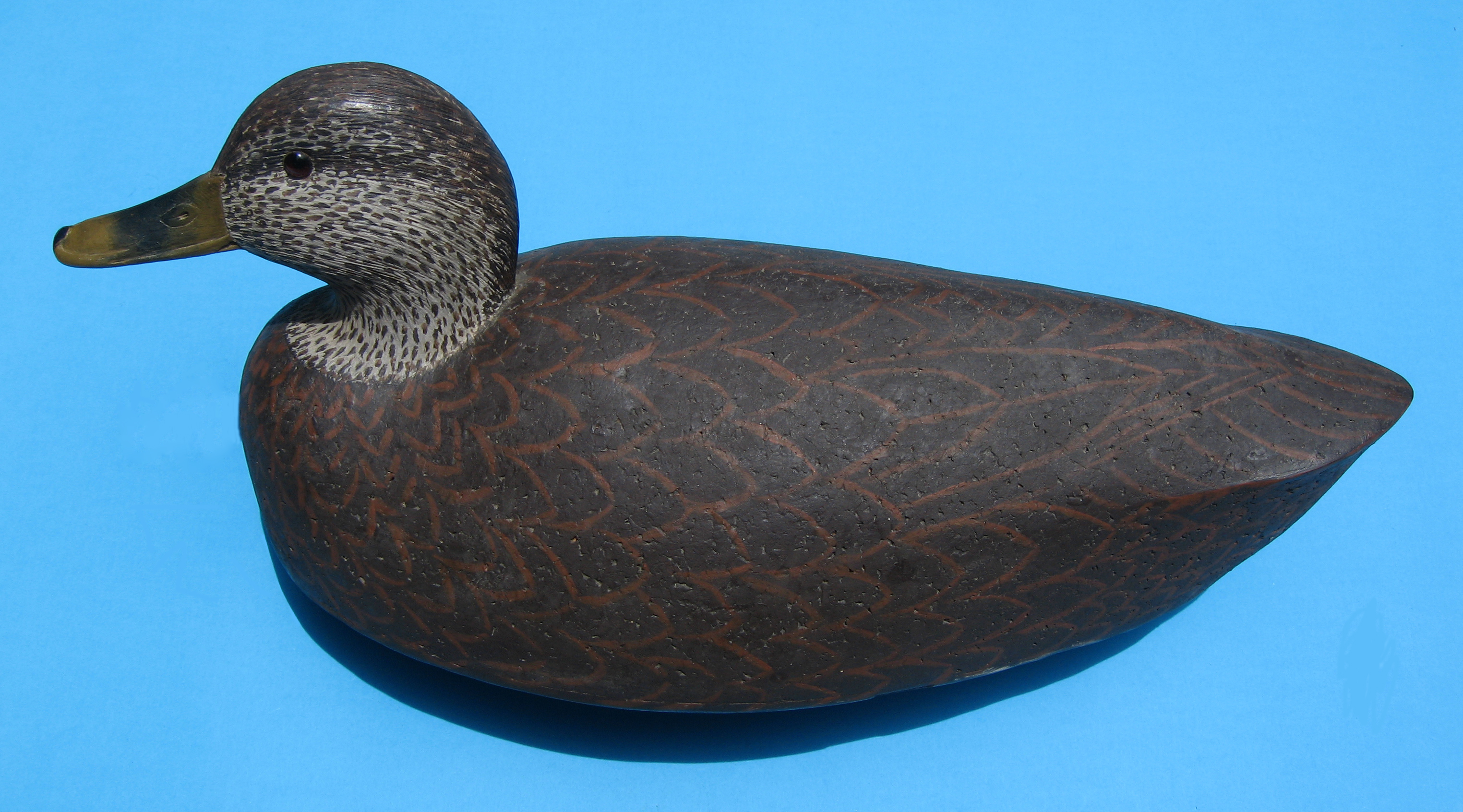
Black duck by Cigar Daisey

Delbert Lee "Cigar" Daisey (March 6, 1928 – April 19, 2017), known as "Cigar" Daisey, was an American waterfowl wood carver and decoy maker. He was the son of Herbert Lee Daisey and Emma Jane Daisey. He was born, lived and worked in Chincoteague, Virginia, and was the resident carver at the Refuge Waterfowl Museum. His decoy carvings are recognized for both their artistic value and functionality as working pieces for waterfowl hunting. His works include black ducks, mallards, redheads, ruddys and red-breasted mergansers and often crafted in drake (male) and hen (female) pairs. He had carved about 1900 ducks in total and he generally used cork or wood as his medium. He carved his first duck out of balsa wood in 1940 at his father's wood shop. The Smithsonian Institution has his works in their collection. He was given his nickname in 1945 by John Buckalew, Federal Game Warden and first manager of the Chincoteague National Wildlife Refuge because Daisey would leave cigar butts to taunt game wardens while poaching ducks on Assateague Island. Later in life, Daisey was an avid conservationist.

One of the most valuable pieces he ever made was a pintail in 1973, as a present for his wife. That was the only fully decorative decoy he had ever made, and was featured in National Geographic magazine, June 1980, page 826. The decoy was estimated to be worth $150,000.
