= Majitu =

Swahili term for mythological creatures

Majitu is a Swahili term used to refer to mythological creatures that were popular in African oral narrative.

Majitu, or Jitu in singular, as tales and legends have it, had mystical powers and could shape-shift to blend in with humans. Their interactions with humans at times led to conflicts, which seldom ended in favour of humans.

Majitu mythology is still popular, and in the 1980s was the subject of a locally produced TV series Sisi Majitu on Kenya Broadcasting Corporation (KBC), Kenya's National Broadcaster. There are currently also efforts to revive these popular mythologies in the near future in the form of an animated Majitu TV series by Kenyan-based Animation and VisualFX producer Peter Mute. According to Mute:

The enduring popularity of Majitu stories makes them an invaluable resource for future kids and youth animated content both from Africa and for the black African demographic, both within the African continent and in diaspora. Yebikenya's animation and visualFX brand – The African SciFi Factory (based in Thika, Kenya), has been working with quite a few collaborators to derive a good basis to re-establish the Majitu mythology to a new-age of African audience ... we believe we've finally found this point of ignition, and systems are now rolling on relaunching the Majitu as a narrative brand to the world...
