= Tule Desert =

Tule Desert may refer to:

- Tule Desert (Arizona)
- Tule Desert (Nevada)
