= Joel Barber =

American architect and wildfowl decoy collector

Joel David Barber (1876–1952) was an early 20th-century architect from New York City who is best known as an early collector and promoter of duck decoys as folk art.

Barber began collecting the carved wooden decoys in 1918 after finding one, a red-breasted merganser hen, by accident near his Long Island boathouse. In addition to collecting and exhibiting the works, Barber organized decoy carving competitions and produced works of his own. This includes a 1932 exhibition composed of 116 decoys in his own collection and 54 contemporary decoys made by Charles "Shang" Wheeler sponsored by Abercrombie & Fitch. But his most enduring contribution was his 1934 book Wild Fowl Decoys which is considered the seminal work on the subject, and remained the definitive collector's guide for many decades after its publication. The book includes images of decoys designed and made by Barber himself. He also wrote a lesser known work of short stories and poetry, Long Shore, based on his experiences as an outdoorsman in New England.

Following his death in 1952, Barber's collection of about 400 decoys was given to the Shelburne Museum in Vermont.

== Bibliography ==
- Wild Fowl Decoys (1934)
- Long Shore (1939)

== See also ==
- Wild Fowl Decoys
- Folk art
- Duck hunting
- The Dorset House
