= The Derrydale Press =

- Parent company: Taylor Trade/Rowman & Littlefield
- Founded: 1927
- Founder: Eugene V. Connett III
- Country of origin: United States
- Headquarters location: New York City
- Publication types: Books
- Nonfiction topics: Outdoors

The Derrydale Press was an American book publishing company founded in 1927 with headquarters on Park Ave. in Manhattan, New York. It was the creation of Princeton University graduate Eugene V. Connett III (1891–1969). He told Time magazine that he got the Derrydale name, "from a bottle of whiskey and a map of Ireland."

An important publisher of outdoor books for North American audiences during the first half of the 20th century, according to a 1938 Time magazine article, it was the only publishing house in the world devoted exclusively to sporting books.

The company went out of business in 1942. Its archives are held by Princeton University. The name was resurrected in the 1990s and the Derrydale Press is currently operated as an imprint of the Rowman & Littlefield Publishing Group of Lanham, Maryland which uses it to put out books on the outdoors as well as hunting, fishing, horse sports, hiking, and sporting art.
