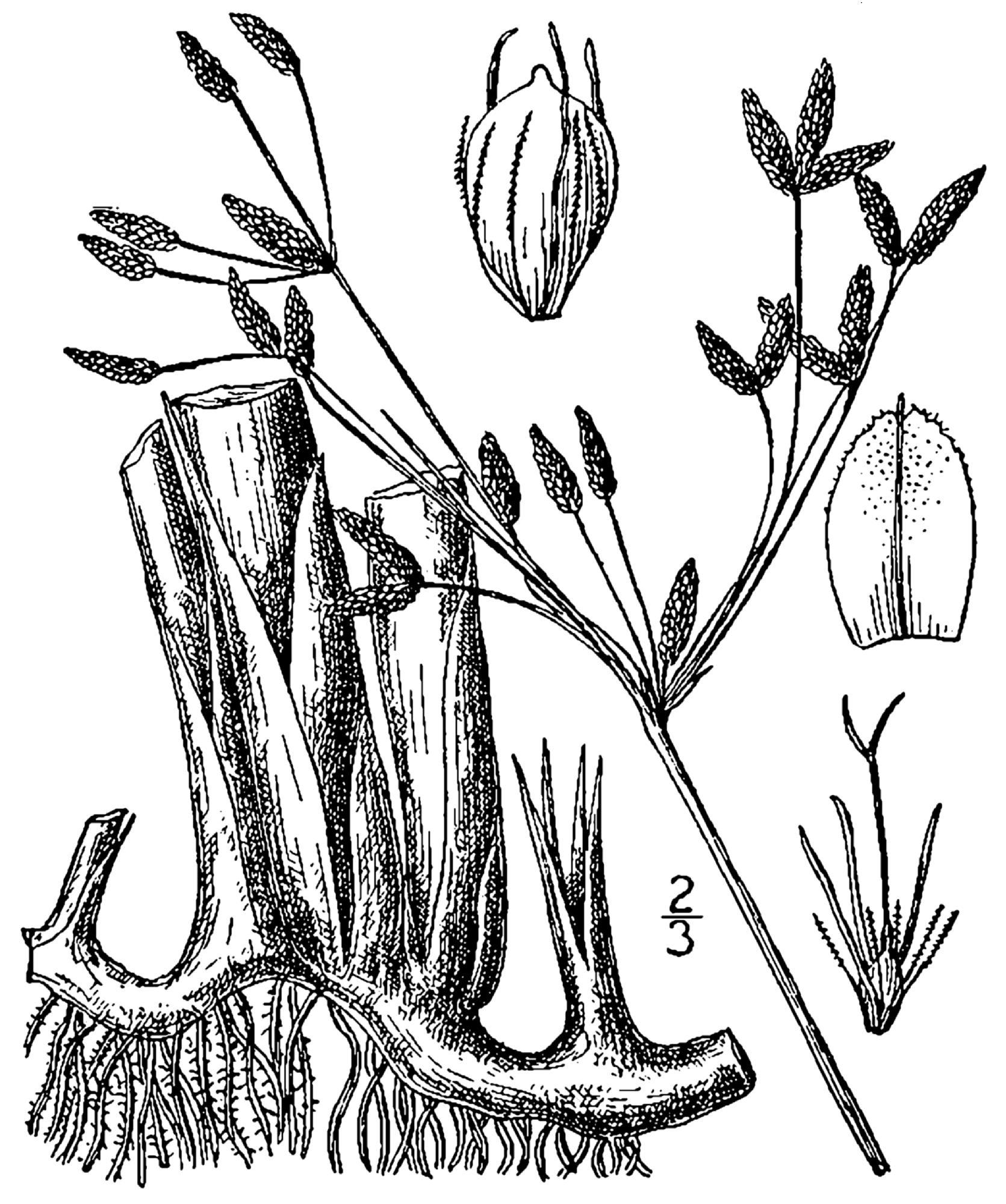
- Schoenoplectus acutus var. occidentalis

Scientific classification
- Kingdom: Plantae
- Clade: Embryophytes
- Clade: Tracheophytes
- Clade: Spermatophytes
- Clade: Angiosperms
- Clade: Monocots
- Clade: Commelinids
- Order: Poales
- Family: Cyperaceae
- Genus: Schoenoplectus
- Species: S. acutus

Binomial name
- Schoenoplectus acutus (Muhl. ex J.M.Bigelow) Á.Löve & D.Löve

= Schoenoplectus acutus =

Species of plant

Schoenoplectus acutus (syn. Scirpus acutus, Schoenoplectus lacustris, Scirpus lacustris subsp. acutus), called tule /ˈtuːliː/, common tule, hardstem tule, tule rush, hardstem bulrush, or viscid bulrush, is a giant species of sedge in the plant family Cyperaceae, native to freshwater marshes all over North America. The common name derives from the Nāhuatl word tōllin [ˈtoːlːin], and it was first recognized by the early Spanish explorers and missionaries in New Spain who saw the marsh plants in the Central Valley of California as similar to those in the marshes around Mexico City being used to construct shelters by the indigenous inhabitants.

== Description ==
Schoenoplectus acutus has a thick, rounded green stem growing to 1 to 3 m (3 to 10 ft) tall, with long, grasslike leaves, and radially symmetrical, clustered, pale brownish flowers.

== Taxonomy ==
The two varieties are:

- Schoenoplectus acutus var. acutus – northern and eastern North America
- Schoenoplectus acutus var. occidentalis – southwestern North America

== Distribution and habitat ==
It is native to freshwater marshes all over North America. It is especially common in wetlands in California.

Tules once lined the shores of Tulare Lake in California, formerly the largest freshwater lake in the western United States, which disappeared due to agricultural development in the early 20th century.

== Ecology ==
Tules at shorelines play an important ecological role, helping to buffer against wind and water forces, thereby allowing the establishment of other types of plants and reducing erosion. Tules are sometimes cleared from waterways using herbicides. When erosion occurs, tule rhizomes are replanted in strategic areas.

== Uses ==
Flour can be made by peeling and cutting up the older roots, crushing and boiling them, removing any fiber, and drying. The seeds can also be ground and mixed with the root flour.

Dyed and woven, tules are used to make baskets, bowls, mats, hats, clothing, duck decoys, and even boats by Native American groups. Before the Salish got horses for bison hunting, they lived in tents covered with sewn mats of tule. At least two tribes, the Wanapum and the Pomo people, constructed tule houses as recently as the 1950s and still do for special occasions. Bay Miwok, Coast Miwok, and Ohlone peoples used the tule in the manufacture of canoes or balsas, for transportation across the San Francisco Bay and using the marine and wetland resources. Northern groups of Chumash used the tule in the manufacture of canoes rather than the sewn-plank tomol usually used by Chumash and used them to gather marine harvests.

The Paiutes named a neighboring tribe the Si-Te-Cah in their language, meaning tule eaters. The young sprouts and shoots can be eaten raw and the rhizomes and unripe flower heads can be boiled as vegetables.

== In culture ==
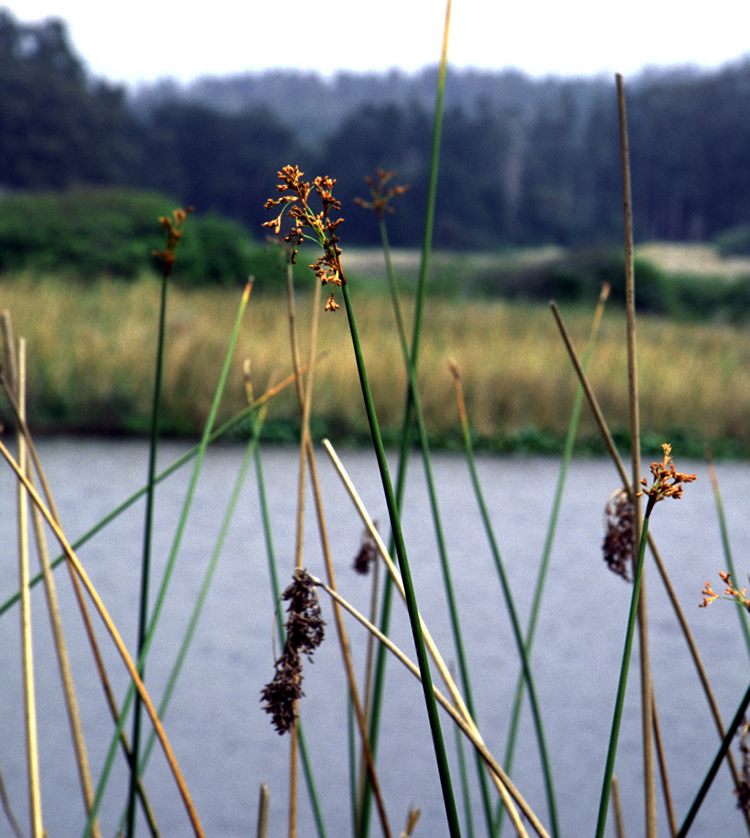
Schoenoplectus acutus at the Humboldt Bay National Wildlife Refuge

One of the few Pomo survivors of the Bloody Island Massacre (also called the Clear Lake Massacre) in Northern California, a 6-year-old girl named Ni'ka (also known as Lucy Moore) evaded the U.S. Cavalry by hiding behind the tule reeds in the bloodied water. Her descendants have since formed the Lucy Moore Foundation to work for better relations between the Pomo and residents of California.

Several places in Cailfornia are named for it, including Tulare (a tulare is a tule marsh). The city of Stockton was originally named Tuleberg by its founder, Charles Weber, and remains today as one of its many nicknames. Tule Lake is near the Oregon border and includes Tule Lake National Wildlife Refuge. It was the site of an internment camp for Japanese Americans during World War II, imprisoning 18,700 people at its peak. The town of Tulelake is northeast of the lake. California also has a Tule River. The Tule Desert is located in Arizona and Nevada. Nevada also has Tule Springs.

The expression "out in the tules" is still common, a colloquialism originating with old Californian families meaning someone who is wading in mud through sharp sticks, or toughing it out like a pioneer, or who is being invited to stay the night. A Midwesterner might find it similar to "out in the boondocks." A synonym is out in the sticks, referring to the tule's razor-sharp stalks when dried up.

California's dense, ground-hugging tule fog is named for the plant, as are the tule elk, tule perch, and tule goose (a subspecies of the greater white-fronted goose). The giant garter snake (Thamnophis gigas) was historically closely associated with tule marshes in California's Central Valley.
