= Asno de las Encartaciones =

Spanish breed of donkey

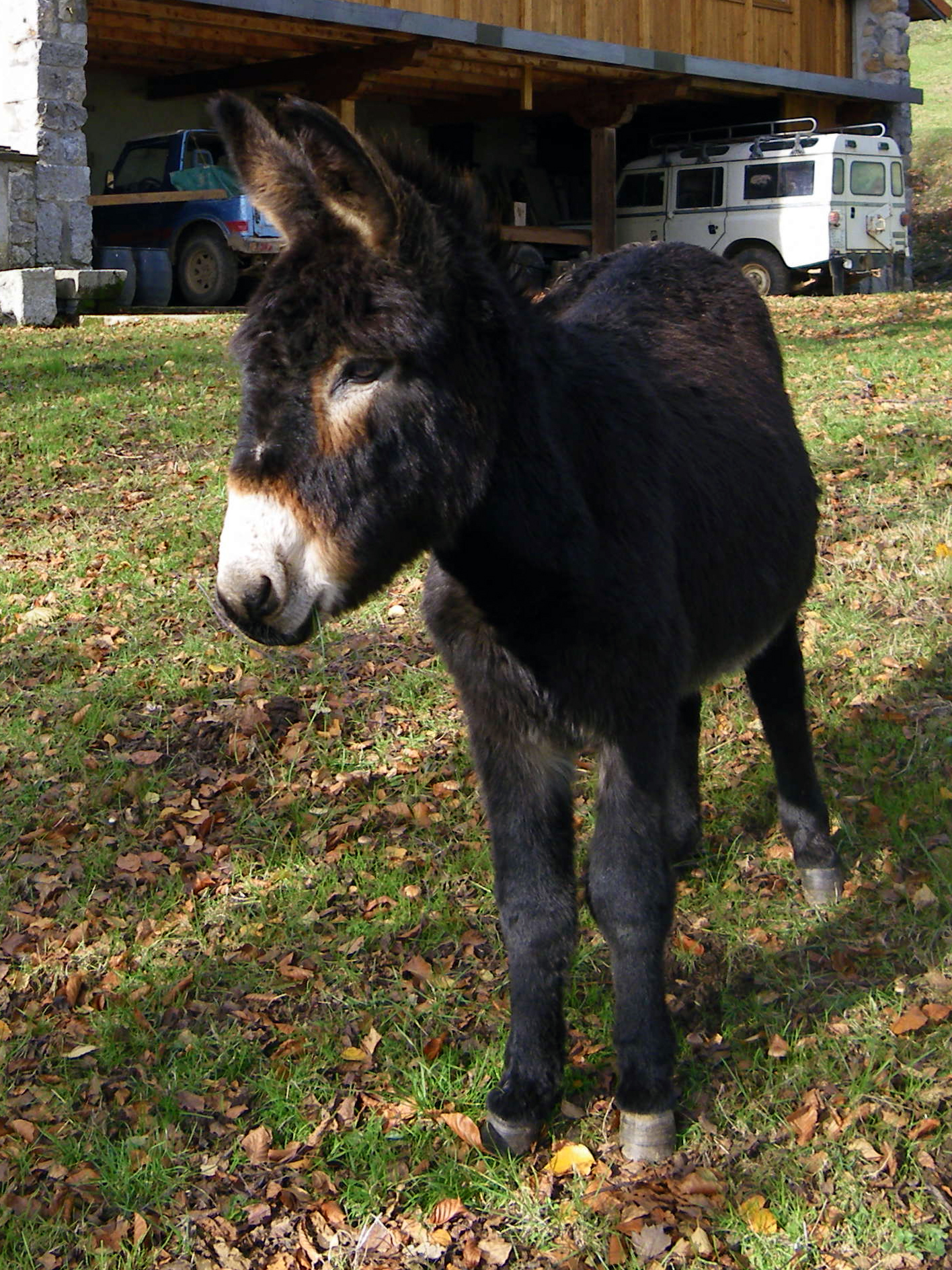
- Conservation status: FAO (2007): critical; SAVE (2008): critical
- Other names: Basque: Enkarterriko asto; Burro de Las Encartaciones
- Country of origin: Spain
- Distribution: Basque Country
- Standard: MAPA (in Spanish)

Traits
- Weight: Male: 170–210 kg; Female: 140–190 kg
- Height: Male: 109–123 cm; Female: 103–123 cm
- Coat: black or dark bay

The Asno de las Encartaciones, Basque: Enkarterriko asto, is a Spanish breed of small domestic donkey from the western part of the autonomous community of the Basque Country, in north-eastern Spain. It is named for the comarca of Las Encartaciones (Enkarterri), in the province of Biscay (Bizkaia). It is the only small donkey breed of Spain, and resembles the Gascon donkey, now a sub-type of the Pyrenean. The Asno de las Encartaciones is critically endangered, and is protected by conservation measures.

== History ==
The Asno de las Encartaciones is indigenous to the western part of the province of Biscay, and is concentrated in the municipalities of Artzentales, Balmaseda, Galdames, Gordexola, Güeñes, Karrantza, Lanestosa, Sopuerta, Turtzioz and Zalla. The breed almost disappeared during the course of the twentieth century. The fall in numbers began in the first decades of the century, and was most rapid in the 1960s and 1970s; the population numbered about 1000 in the early 70s, and had fallen to barely 100 by the late 90s. As with other donkey breeds, the principal causes were the mechanisation of agriculture and the depopulation of rural areas.

The Asno de las Encartaciones was presented at agricultural fairs in Gordexola in 1994 and at Markina in 1995. As a result, a breeders' association, the Asociación para la protección y Defensa del Burro de Las Encartaciones, was formed in 1996, and a conservation plan, including a 12-hectare reserve at Gordexola, was published in 1999.

The breed was officially recognised in 2004. Its conservation status was listed as "critical" by the Food and Agriculture Organization of the United Nations in 2007 and by the SAVE Foundation in 2008. No population data is published by the Ministerio de Agricultura, Alimentación y Medio Ambiente, the Spanish ministry of agriculture. Numbers of about 100 were reported in 1999, 2001 and 2008.

== Characteristics ==
The Asno de las Encartaciones is the only small donkey breed in Spain. It stands about 120 cm and weighs approximately 200 kg. The coat is black or dark bay in colour; the belly, muzzle and surround of the eyes are pale-coloured. It may have a darker dorsal stripe.

== Use ==
The Asno de las Encartaciones is small but strong. It was used in the extraction of minerals from the mines of the Cantabrian coast, and in all kinds of agricultural work. Its hooves are small and do not damage the terrain. Because of the competitive nature of jacks, Basque farmers preferred to keep jennies; the meat of jack foals slaughtered at about three months was a traditional local delicacy.
