= Valle de Villaverde =

- Municipality
- Flag Coat of arms

- Location of Valle de Villaverde in Cantabria

- Location in Spain Valle de Villaverde (Cantabria)
- Coordinates: 43°14′43″N 3°15′37″W
- Country: Spain
- Autonomous community: Cantabria
- Province: Cantabria
- Comarca: Asón-Agüera
- Judicial district: Castro Urdiales
- Capital: La Matanza

Government
  - Alcalde: Pedro María Llaguno Artolachipi (2007) (PRC)

Area
  - Total: 19.53 km^{2} (7.54 sq mi)
- Elevation: 190 m (620 ft)

Population (2025-01-01)
  - Total: 249
  - Density: 12.7/km^{2} (33.0/sq mi)
- Time zone: UTC+1 (CET)
  - Summer (DST): UTC+2 (CEST)
- Postal code: 39880
- Official language(s): Spanish

Valle de Villaverde (Basque: Villaverde Ibarra; also, until 2005, Villaverde de Trucíos; Truciosko Villaverde) is a town and municipality in the autonomous community of Cantabria, Spain. It is surrounded by the Basque municipalities of Carranza, Arcentales, and Trucíos, but the town belongs to the administration of the government of Cantabria. Thus, it is an enclave of Biscay and an exclave of Cantabria.

In the south of the municipality are the headwaters of the Río Agüera, whose valley includes altitudes of more than 400 metres (1,300 feet). The municipality is crossed from west to east by the Santander-Bilbao railway line operated by FEVE.

== Localities ==
The municipality is made up of the following localities:

- La Altura
- El Campo
- La Capitana
- Los Hoyos
- La Iglesia
- Laiseca
- La Matanza (the capital)
- Mollinedo
- Palacio
- Villanueva

== History ==
The area was settled in pre-Roman times not by the Cantabri but by the Autrigones. It was colonized by Rome, and later became part of the Kingdom of Asturias, as did the rest of Las Encartaciones and the heart of Biscay.

The valley was purchased in the mid-15th century by Pedro Fernández de Velasco, at which point it ceased to be part of Biscay, the antecedent to its current status as an enclave. The 1822 and 1833 territorial divisions of Spain gave it the name Villaverde de Trucíos; in 2005 it returned to its traditional name, Valle de Villaverde.

The region was devastated in the Carlist battles of 1875; as a result, few old buildings survive. One notable older building is the Church of Santa María, its interior in ruins due to the 1875 fighting and later abandonment.

== Demography ==
Demographic evolution
1900	1910	1920	1930	1940	1950	1960	1970	1980	1990	2000	2007
726	738	741	764	757	756	756	565	464	459	367	383

Source: INE

== Politics and government ==
As with the larger Enclave of Treviño (a Burgalese exclave surrounded by Álava), Basque nationalists wish to incorporate Valle de Villaverde into the surrounding Basque province, in this case Biscay. Also similarly, this intent is opposed by the Cantabrian government: Miguel Ángel Revilla, president of the autonomous community of Cantabria was clear in his unwillingness to cede the municipality. In 1979, deputies (congressmen) Xabier Arzalluz of the Basque Nationalist Party (PNV) and Juan María Bandrés of Euskadiko Ezkerra, affirmed that Article 8 of the then-new Statute of Autonomy of the Basque Country was intended to integrate the enclave of Treviño into Álava and the enclave of Villaverde into Biscay.

Although the leading political party in municipal elections in recent years has been the Regionalist Party of Cantabria, in decades past Valle de Villaverde (then Villaverde de Trucíos) was more inclined to integrate itself into the surrounding province of Biscay. Piedad González, mayor of Villaverde de Trucíos beginning in May 1983, originally as a member of the Spanish Socialist Workers' Party and later as an independent socialist, was described by El País in 1987 as an "impenitent defender of integration into Biscay."

The following tables show the results of the 2003 and 2007 municipal elections.

Municipal Elections, 25 May 2003
Party	Votes	%	Council seats
PRC	259	84.09%	6
PP	38	12.34%	1
Mayor: Pedro Luis María Llaguno (PRC)

Municipal Elections, 27 May 2007
Party	Votes	%	Council seats
PRC	238	71.90%	6
IU	59	17.82%	1
Mayor: Pedro Luis María Llaguno (PRC)
