= Galdames =

- Municipality
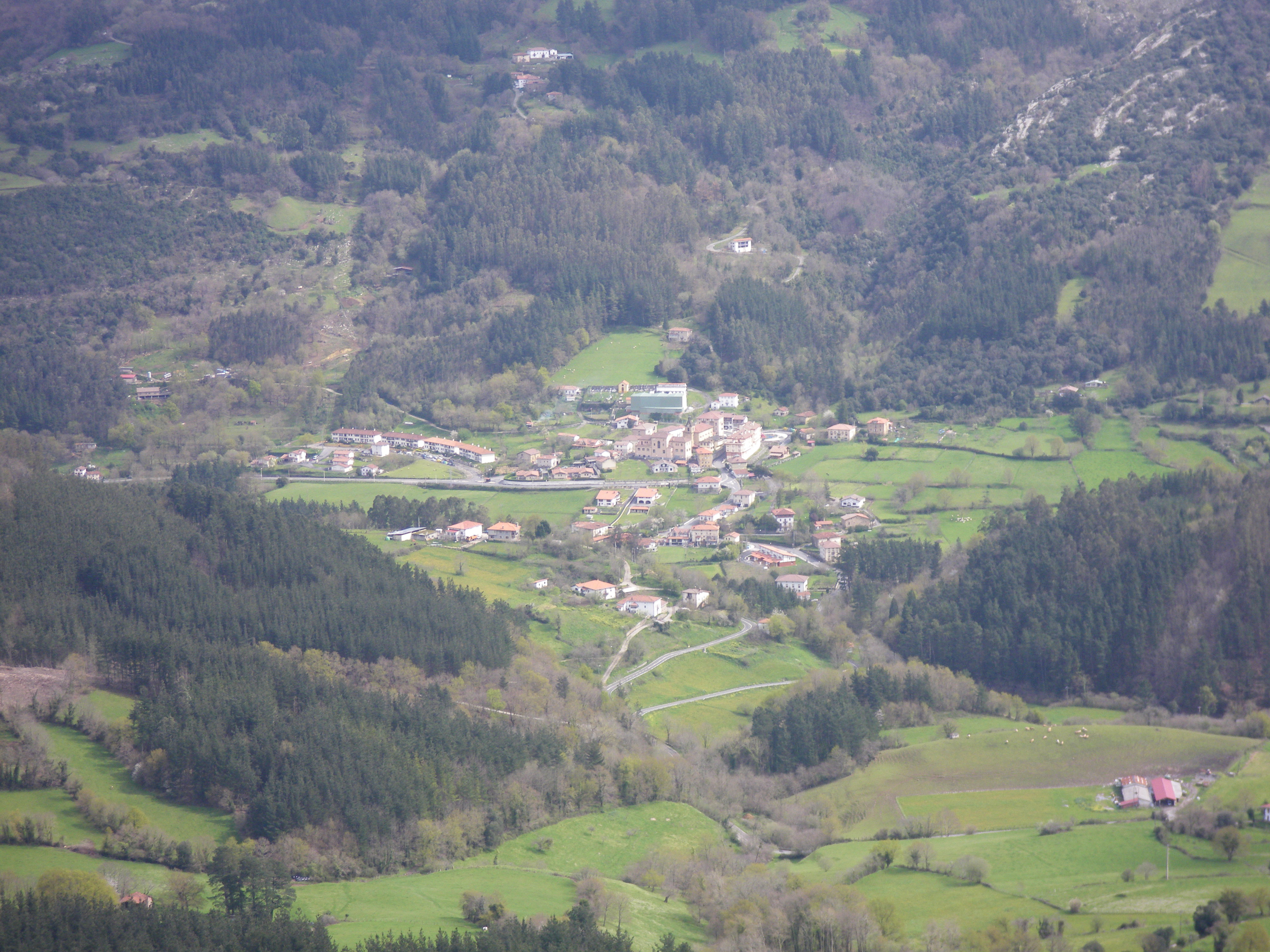
- View from Serantes

- Coat of arms

- Location of Galdames within the Basque Country
- Coordinates: 43°15′18″N 3°5′47″W
- Country: Spain
- Autonomous community: Basque Country
- Province: Biscay
- Comarca: Enkarterri

Government
  - Alcalde: Carlos Avellanal Villanueva (EAJ-PNV)

Area
  - Total: 44.36 km^{2} (17.13 sq mi)
- Elevation: 166 m (545 ft)

Population (2025-01-01)
  - Total: 829
  - Density: 18.7/km^{2} (48.4/sq mi)
- Demonym: galdamestarra
- Time zone: UTC+1 (CET)
  - Summer (DST): UTC+2 (CEST)
- Postal code: 48191
- Official language(s): Basque, Spanish
- Website: Official website

Galdames (Basque pronunciation: [ɡaldames̺]) is a town, valley, and municipality located in the Biscay province of the autonomous community of Basque Country, Spain.

Main sights are Santa Maria Magdalena and Arenaza caves, both situated in Triano mountain range and the latter containing stalactites and rest of mining operations. The medieval Torre Loizaga is located in Concejuelo, which is now the site of a classic car museum.

== History ==
The town of Galdames was first mentioned in a document dating to 1214. During the Middle Ages, Galdames was the home of various important lords and their families. The towers of the local Loizaga, Atxurriaga and Larrea people bear witness to this.

The Council of Galdames claimed the right to be a member of the Lordship of Biscay, which it received in 1672. In 1740 the council separated from the Lordship of Biscay before rejoining in 1800.

During the First Carlist War, the followers of Baldomero Espartero burned the forests surrounding San Pedro Galdames. From the 19th to mid-20th centuries, the town prospered due to the mineral wealth located beneath the valley.

In 1946, a group of Maquis returned from the Cantabrian mountains to Bizkaia and constructed a sheltered in the cave of Uraiaga and the surrounding mines.

== Geography ==
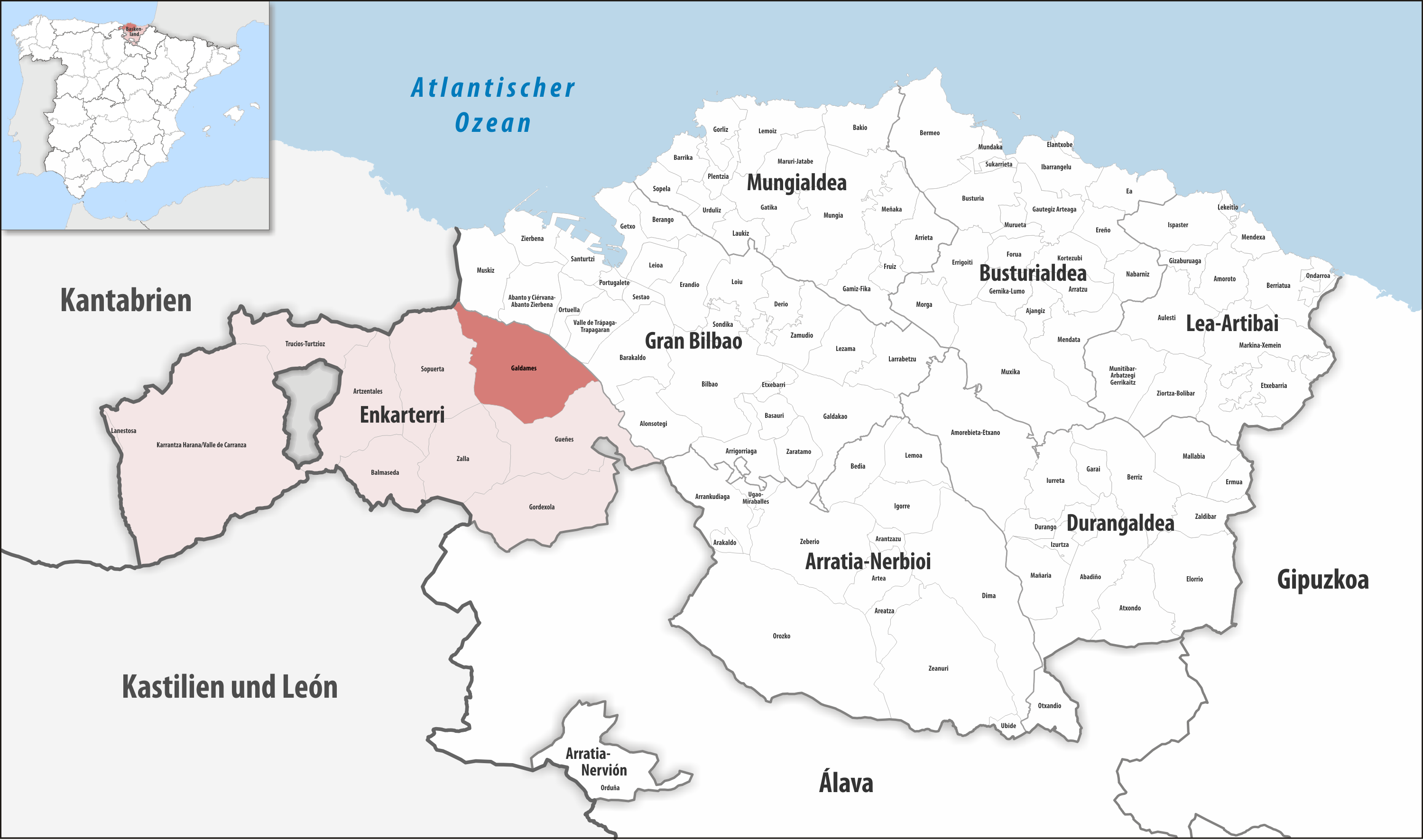
Location of the municipality of Galdames within Enkarterri

The municipality of Galdames is located in the northeastern corner of the comarca of Enkarterri. It borders the municipalities of Sopuerta, Zalla, and Gueñes in Enkarterri; and the municipalities of Muskiz, Abanto y Ciérvana-Abanto Zierbena, Ortuella, Valle de Trápaga-Trapagaran, and Barakaldo in Gran Bilbao.

The municipality of Galdames is centred around the valley of Galdames, a WNW-ESE oriented valley which lies within the Basque Mountains. Notable peaks overlooking the valley include Pico Mayor to the northeast, Ganeran to the east, Luxar to the south, and Larrea to the southwest.

Galdames Creek flows north-westward through the valley before meeting the Barbadun River in Montellano. From there, the Barbadun River flows northward into Muskiz.

== Demography ==
Population of Galdames
Year	Pop.	±%
1900	2,886	—
1910	3,856	+33.6%
1920	3,854	−0.1%
1930	3,335	−13.5%
1940	3,022	−9.4%
1950	2,312	−23.5%
1960	1,892	−18.2%
1970	1,249	−34.0%
1981	812	−35.0%
1991	799	−1.6%
2001	799	+0.0%
2011	851	+6.5%
2021	831	−2.4%

Despite being located in the west of Biscay near Bilbao, Galdames didn't experience the same population growth that other municipalities in the area – such as Barakaldo, Sestao, and Portugalete – had during the second half of the 20th century. Contrary to regional trends, the population of Galdames declined significantly between 1920 and 1981 before stabilizing.

As of 2021, Galdames has a population of 831, which is only about 21.6% of its population in 1920.

== Neighborhoods ==
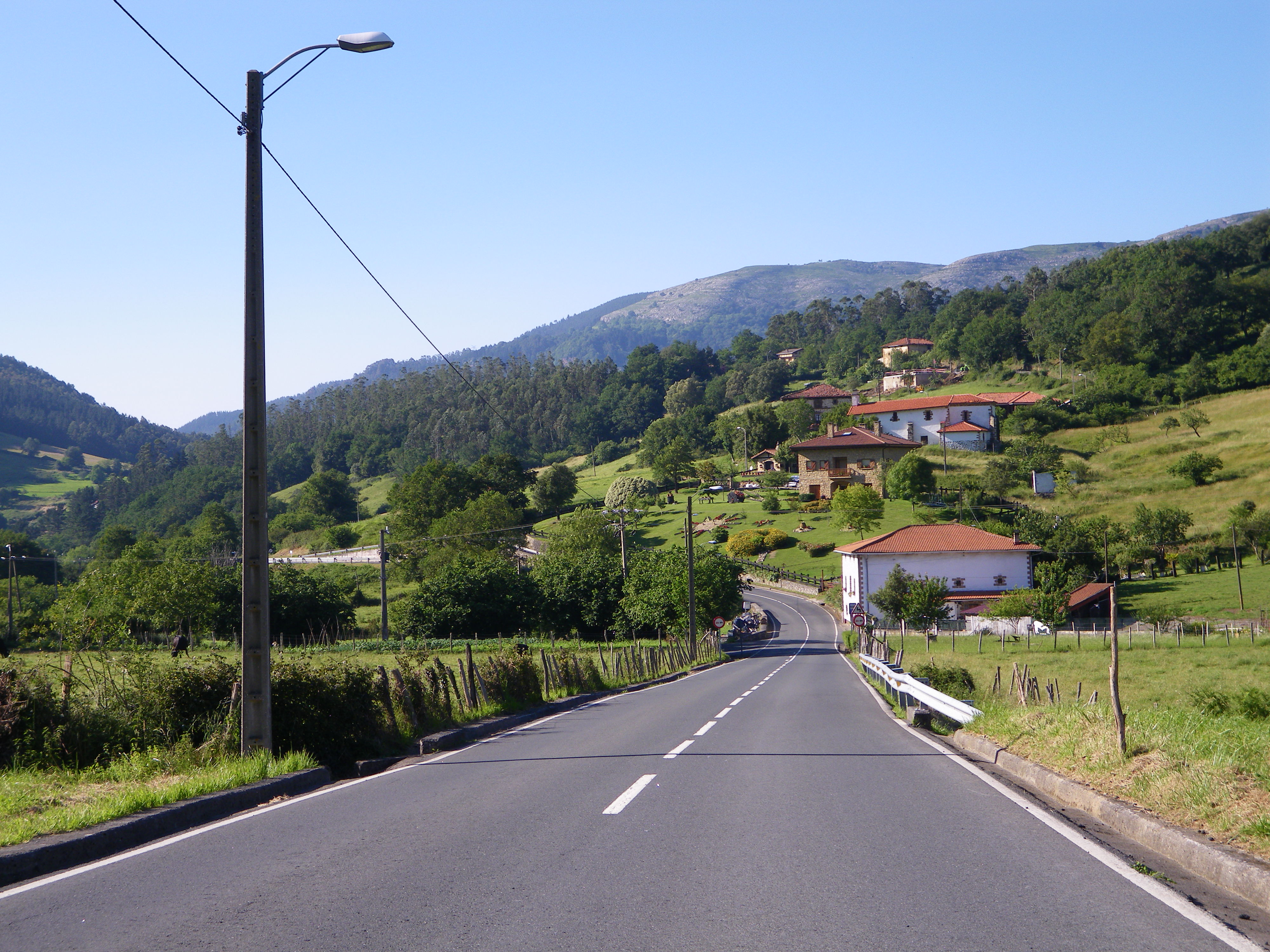
Village of Txabarri, about 1 km (0.62 mi) south of San Pedro Galdames

Galdames is administratively divided into 8 neighborhoods or wards, with San Pedro Galdames being the most populous:

- Atxuriaga (La Aceña)
- Concejuelo
- Humaran
- Larrea
- Montellano
- San Esteban Galdames
- San Pedro Galdames
- Txabarri
