= Balmaseda =

- Municipality
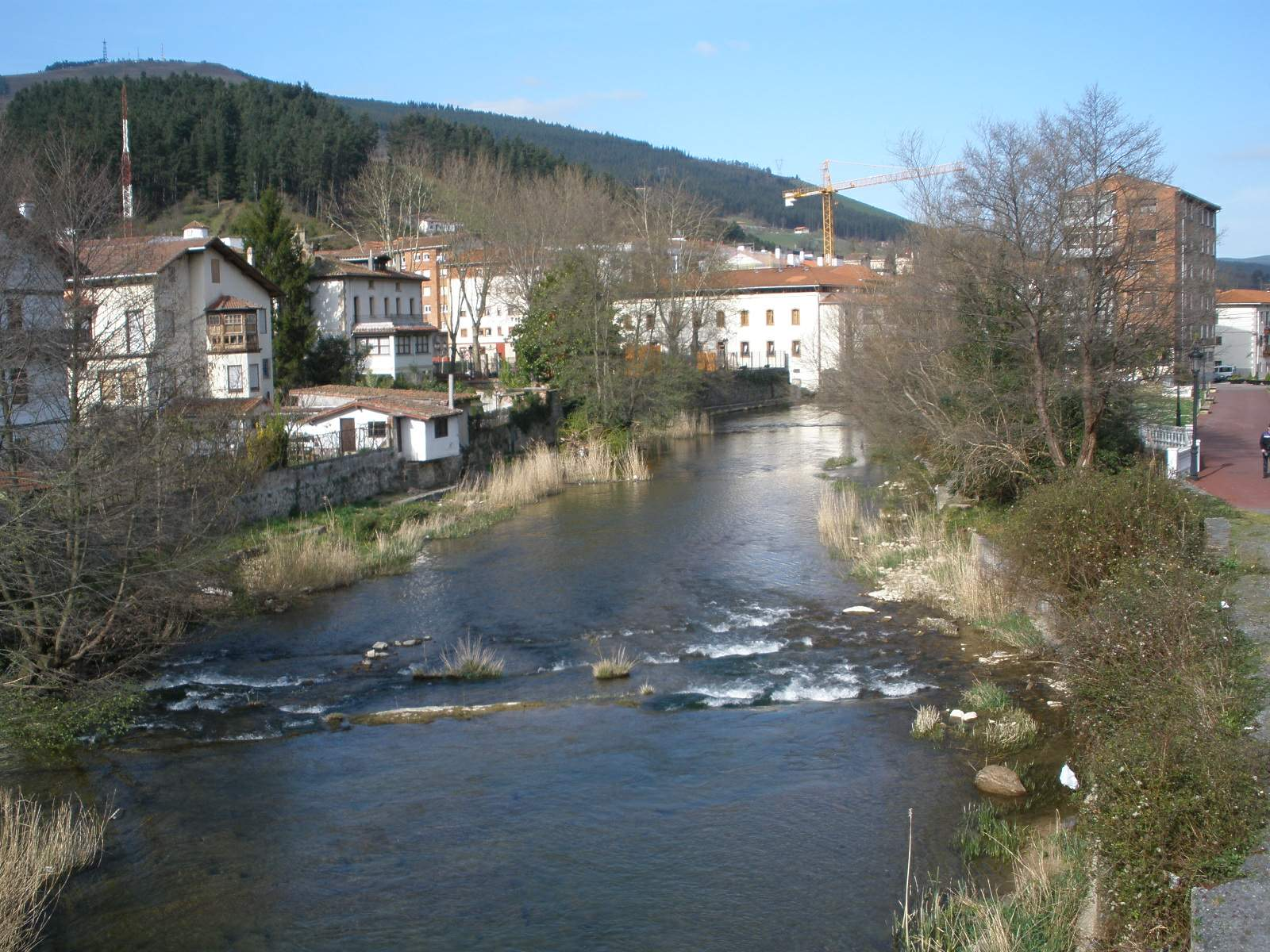

- Flag Coat of arms

- Location of Balmaseda within the Basque Country
- Coordinates: 43°11′45″N 03°11′34″W
- Country: Spain
- Autonomous community: Basque Country
- Province: Biscay
- Comarca: Enkarterri
- Established: 1199

Government
  - Mayor: Joseba Zorrilla Ibáñez (EAJ-PNV)

Area
  - Total: 223 km^{2} (86 sq mi)
- Elevation: 146 m (479 ft)

Population (2025-01-01)
  - Total: 7,718
  - Density: 34.6/km^{2} (89.6/sq mi)
- Time zone: UTC+1 (CET)
  - Summer (DST): UTC+2 (CEST)
- Postal code: 48800
- Website: www.balmaseda.net

Balmaseda (in Basque and officially, in Spanish: Valmaseda) is a town and municipality located in the province of Biscay, in the Basque Country. Balmaseda is the capital city of the comarca of Enkarterri, in western Biscay and plays an important role in the province due to its proximity to the capital city of Bilbao and the regions of Cantabria and Castile and León.

== Etymology ==
Its toponomy probably comes from a union of the Spanish word val (apocope of valle), meaning "valley", and the Basque mahatseta, which means "vineyard", Val-Mahatseta would then mean "valley of vineyards", which would eventually evolve into Valmaseda, currently in use in Spanish, and Balmaseda, following the orthographic rules of the Basque language.

== History ==
The lands in which Balmaseda is located had been inhabited since centuries before its official foundation, with evidence of ancient pastoral activity. In the eastern end of the municipality there is a Roman milestone which belonged to the Pisorica-Flaviobriga road, which connected the present-day cities of Castro Urdiales and Herrera de Pisuerga. This road is believed to have been in use at least since the 1st Century, as the milestone is dated 238. Even though the town's old bridge could have been built simultaneously, definite evidence of its existence is from some centuries later.

The territory in which today is located Balmaseda belonged to the valley of Mena, part of the Kingdom of Navarre. The Castilians occupied it in 1175, moment when the king handed over the territory to Lope Sánchez de Mena, Lord of Bortedo and kin of the Lord of Biscay. Lope Sánchez founded then the village, probably on the same location of a previous settlement, in one of the banks of the river Kadagua, granting the village the fuero of Logroño. Among the reasons for the foundation of the village were its protected location between mountains and the existence of a commercial road connecting to Castile and Biscay.

The village was incorporated into the lands of the Lord of Biscay when the Lord Lope Díaz II de Haro married the daughter of Alfonso IX, thus obtaining the territories of Balmaseda and Orduña. In 1234, Lope confirmed the municipal charter establishing Balmaseda as a town. However, this first union with Biscay would not last much; in 1255 the town was converted back to Castile because of the disputes caused by Diego López III de Haro. In 1274 it was given back to Biscay to be once more handed back to Castile in 1288 after the murder of Lope Díaz III in Alfaro following the orders of Sancho IV. Diego López IV would once more reinstate Balmaseda into Biscay. In 1312, after the disputes between Biscay and Castile, Balmaseda was once more reintegrated into the kingdom. The town would be incorporated again in Biscay in 1388, as it was requested by the village itself.

During the Middle Ages, Balmaseda was home to a Jewish community until their voluntary departure in 1487.

On 5 November 1808 the city was the theatre of the Battle of Valmaseda, part of the Peninsular War, between French and Spanish armies.

In May 2016, the return of Valmaseda to the Las Encartaciones Commonwealth, from which it had left in 2001, was agreed. The inclusion was carried out with the votes in favor of PNV, Avant Gordexola and Agrupación Electoral Independiente, three abstentions by EH Bildu and the vote against by Zalla Bai and Karrantza Zabala. The Carranza government team presented a judicial appeal on behalf of the municipal group, on the contrary, the mayor of Zalla, Javier Portillo Berasaluze, presented the judicial appeal against membership on behalf of the Zalla City Council.

== Geography ==
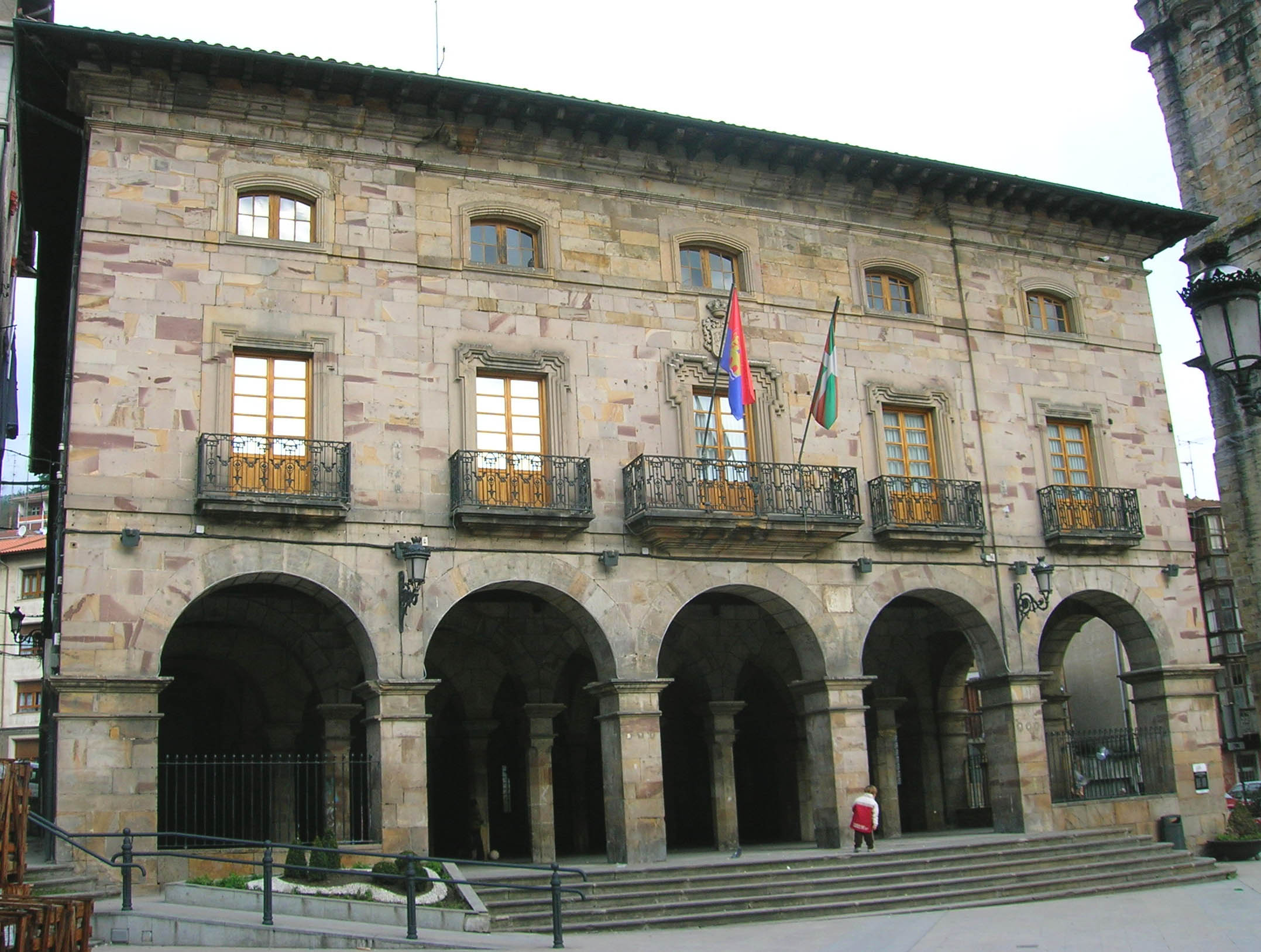
Balmaseda's town hall

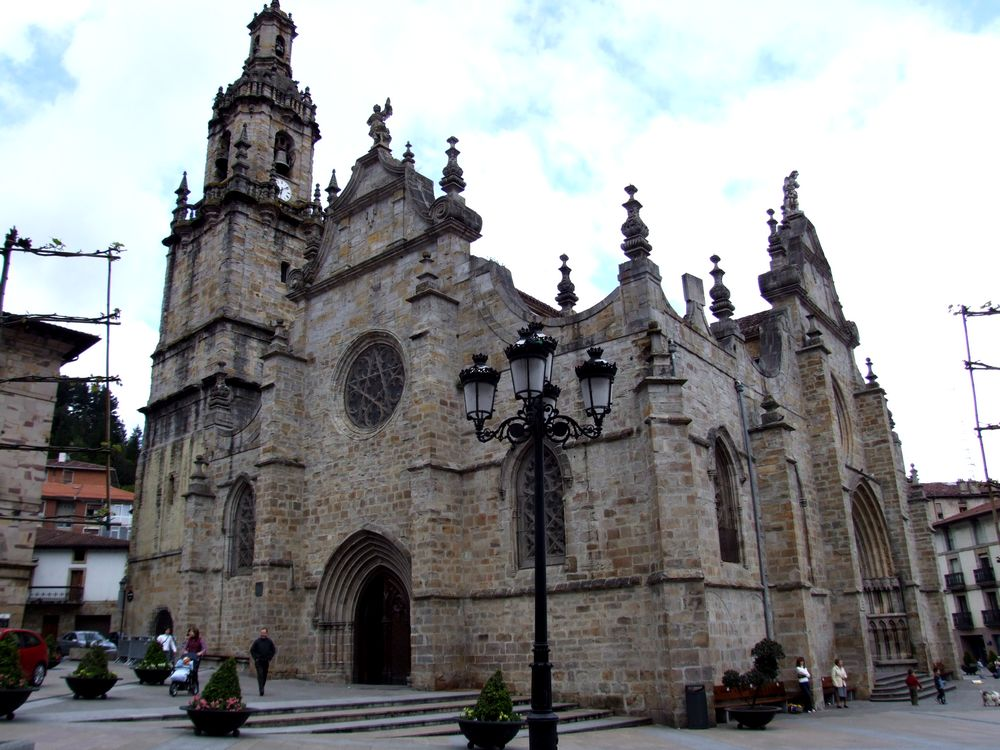
Iglesia de San Severino (Cathedral)

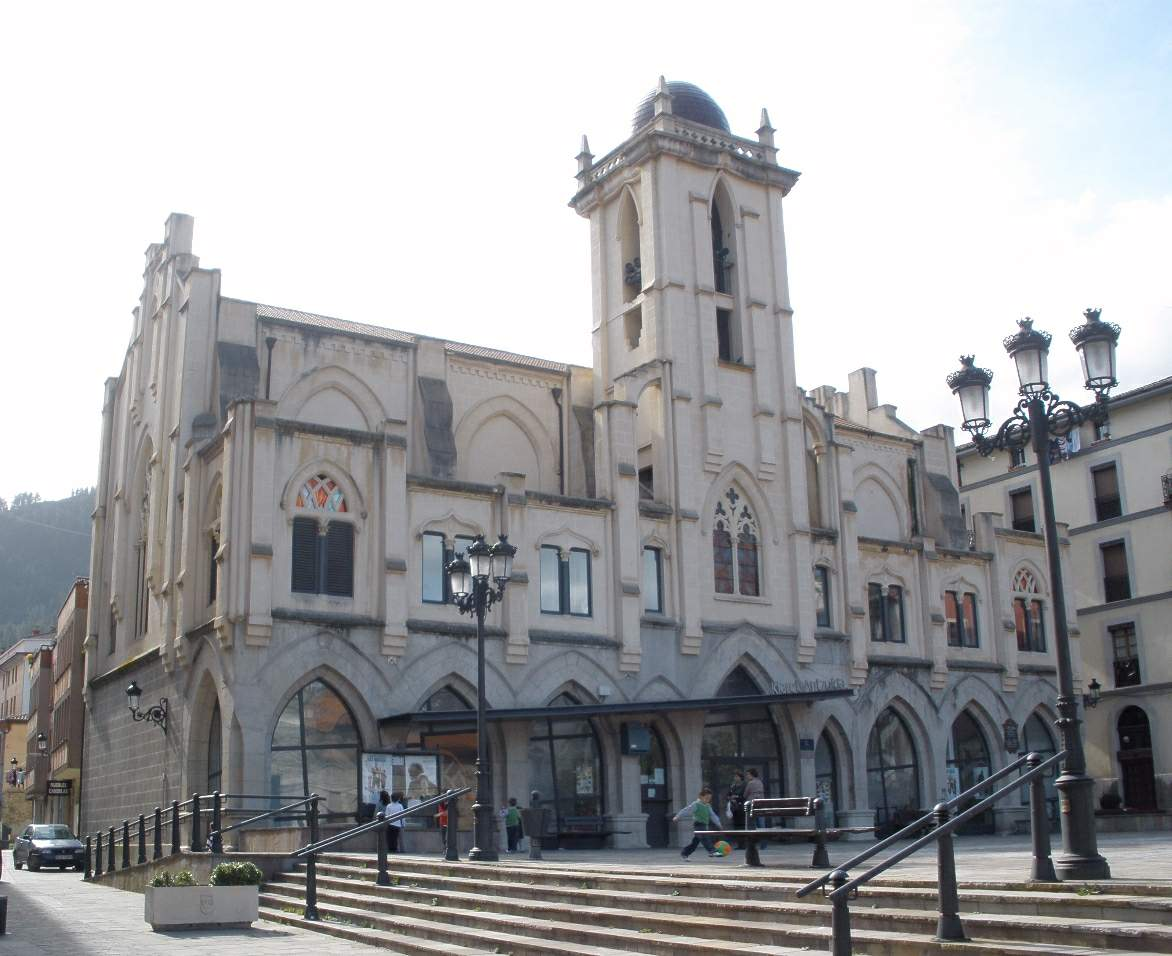
Iglesia del Sagrado Corazon de Maria

The municipality of Balmaseda is located in very mountainous territory, in southwestern Biscay and 30 kilometers away from the province capital city Bilbao. Balmaseda is located in the comarca of Enkarterri and it borders Artzentales, in the west, with Sopuerta in the north and Zalla in the east. In the south Balmaseda borders with the autonomous community of Castile and León (province of Burgos). It is surrounded by the Ordunte mountains; Kolitza, Canto, Terreros and La Garbea.

Nature park of Valley of Karrantza with Pozalagua Cave situated not far (and accessible by public buses and taxi) from Balmaseda.

=== Hydrography ===
The main river of the municipality is the river Kadagua, which forms the narrow valley where the town is located. The river is joined by several minor streams as the Acebo, Coliza, Tueros and Angostura. The river Kadagua has had historical importance for the town and still today has an important symbolism, as it is present on the town's coat of arms.

== Social sphere ==
Amongst city's landmarks are Puente Viejo Roman Bridge (XIII), Ayuntmiento-Town Hall, Cathedral Iglesia de San Severino (XIV), Church of Sagrado Corazón (Klaret Antzokia), Iglesia San Juan, Iglesia de Santa Clara with museum, Palacio Horcasitas, Balmaseda historical museum, La Encartada beret factory museum, modern court of justice.

Balmaseda carries Medieval market in March and San Severino festival on 23 October.

Balmaseda has Sociedad Deportiva Balmaseda Fútbol Club (since 1914) with home La Baluga camp stadium.

== Transport ==
Balmaseda is connected with the rest of the province of Enkarterri region and the capital city of Bilbao by the BI-636 road and by the narrow-gauge railway Feve and by bus (Bizkaibus -route number A0651).

== Personalities ==
Pedro Hurtado de Mendoza (1578–1641), an important Jesuit author of theological and philosophical textbooks.

== Twin towns – sister cities ==
- (Western Sahara) Tifariti, Sahrawi Arab Democratic Republic
- San Severino Marche, Italy
- Balmaceda, Chile

== See also ==
- Balmaceda, an alternate spelling found in Spanish surnames.
