= Torre Loizaga =

Coordinates: 43.2516°N 3.1292°W

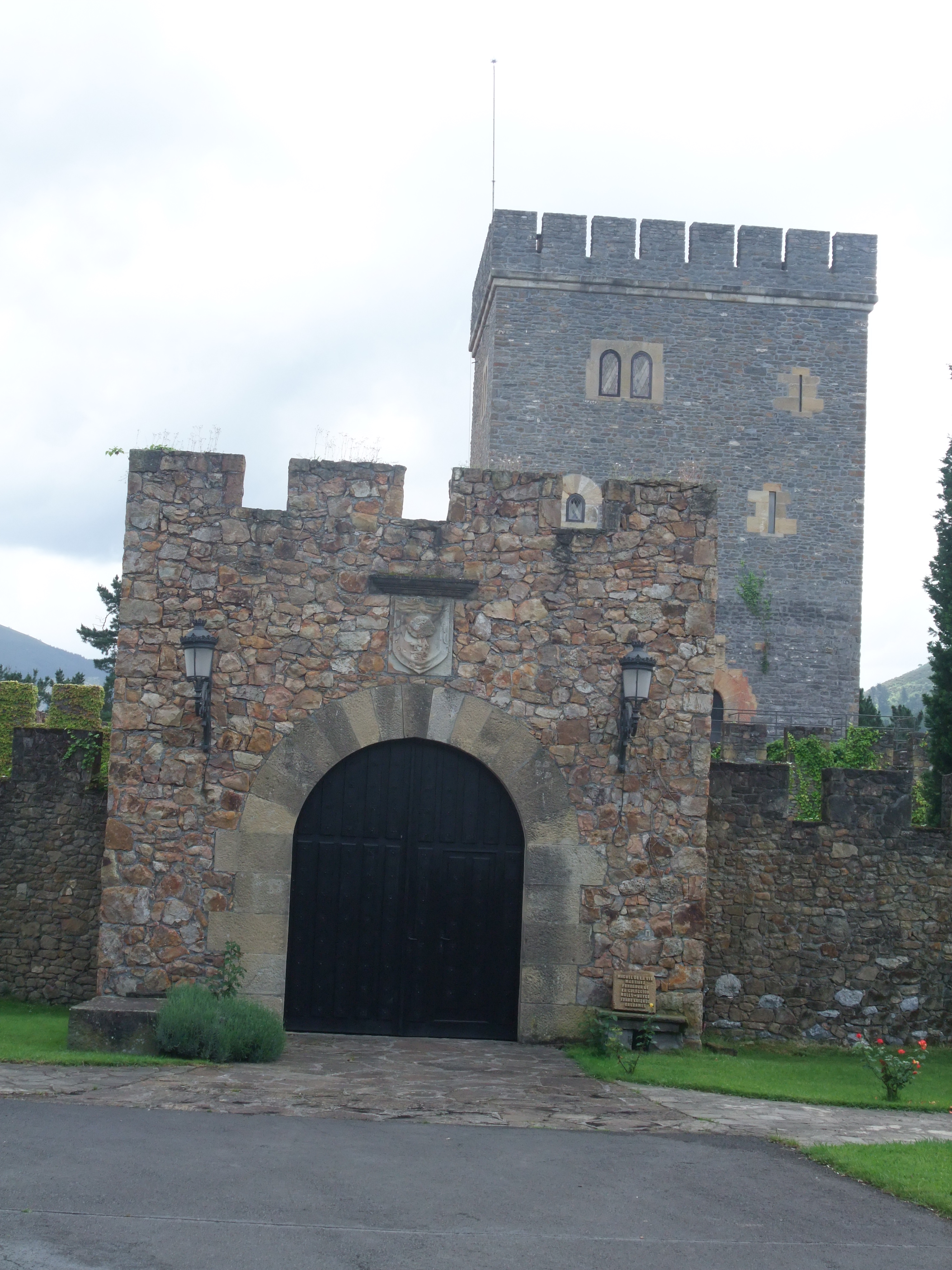
- Established: 1978
- Location: Biscay, Basque Country, Spain
- Type: Automobile museum
- Website: Official website

Torre Loizaga is a renovated tower house and automobile museum, located in Concejuelo de Galdames, Biscay in the Basque Country, Spain.

== Museum ==
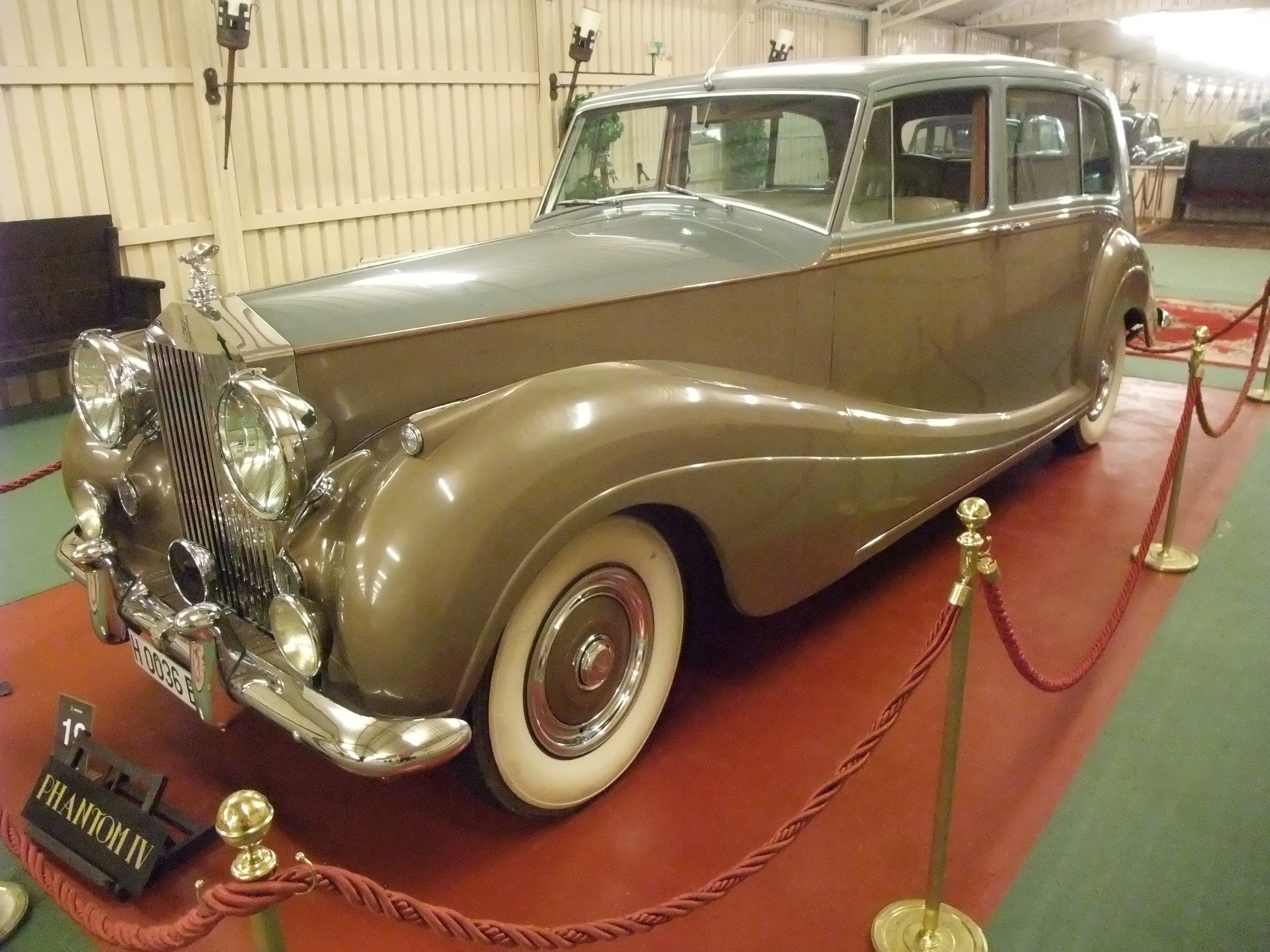
1956 Rolls-Royce Phantom IV, one of only 18 manufactured.

Described as one of the most significant Rolls-Royce collections in the world, it contains 45 Rolls-Royce cars in three pavilions, in a total of 75 cars on display. Its most significant cars are an 1899 Allen Runabout, and a rare 1956 Rolls-Royce Phantom IV, originally owned by HH Abdullah III Al-Salim Al-Sabah, Hakim of Kuwait.

The museum is open from 10:00 AM to 3:00 PM during the summer, and costs €7 for adults, and €3 for children between 12 and 18 years of age.

== Transport ==
Located 45mins drive from Bilbao, most reviews suggest that an authorised tour bus is both the easiest way to get there, and to find the hard to locate castle.

If travelling by car, exit the Autovía A-8 at Abanto y Ciérvana-Abanto Zierbena, and head south on the N-634 towards Las Carreras and Somorrostro Muskiz. On reaching Somorrostro Muskiz, take the BI-2701 south towards Sopuerta. Then take the BI-3631 East towards Galdames Güeñes (second road marked to Galdames Guenes), to kilometre marker 33, and then take mud track south marked towards Torre Loizaga.

== Collection ==
=== Rolls-Royce ===
- Rolls-Royce Silver Ghost Roi Des Belges (1910)
- Rolls-Royce Silver Ghost Alpine Eagle (1914)
- Rolls-Royce Silver Ghost 40-50 HP (1921)
- Rolls-Royce Silver Ghost (1921)
- Rolls-Royce Silver Ghost Springfield Cabrio (1922)
- Rolls-Royce Silver Ghost (1923)
- Rolls-Royce Silver Ghost Springfield Limousine (1924)
- Rolls-Royce Silver Ghost Springfield Sedanca (1925)
- Rolls-Royce Phantom I Landalette/Sedanca (1926)
- Rolls-Royce Silver Ghost Tilbury (1926)
- Rolls-Royce 20 HP Doctor's Coupe (1926)
- Rolls-Royce Phantom I Doctor's Coupe (1927)
- Rolls-Royce Phantom I Cabrio Aluminio (1928)
- Rolls-Royce 20 HP Cabrio (1928)
- Rolls-Royce Phantom I Springfield (1929)
- Rolls-Royce Phantom II Cabrio Aluminio (1930)
- Rolls-Royce Phantom II S Coupe Continental (1932)
- Rolls-Royce Phantom II Limousine (1933)
- Rolls-Royce 20/25 Sport Saloon (1934)
- Rolls-Royce 20/25 Cabrio (1934)
- Rolls-Royce Phantom III Limousine (1936)
- Rolls-Royce Phantom III Sedanca (1936)
- Rolls-Royce 25/30 Berlina (1937)
- Rolls-Royce Wraith Berlina (1939)
- Rolls-Royce Silver Wraith I 4P. Sport Saloon (1948)
- Rolls-Royce Silver Wraith Sedanca (1953)
- Rolls-Royce Silver Wraith (1954)
- Rolls-Royce Silver Dawn (1955)
- Rolls-Royce Phantom IV (1956)
- Rolls-Royce Silver Cloud I Berlina (1957)
- Rolls-Royce Silver Wraith (1958)
- Rolls-Royce Silver Cloud II (1960)
- Rolls-Royce Phantom V (1961)
- Rolls-Royce Silver Cloud II (1962)
- Rolls-Royce Silver Cloud III (1966)
- Rolls-Royce Phantom VI (1970)
- Rolls-Royce Silver Shadow Coupe (1970)
- Rolls-Royce Corniche (1972)
- Rolls-Royce Camargue (1975)
- Rolls-Royce Silver Shadow II (1979)
- Rolls-Royce Silver Wraith II (1980)
- Rolls-Royce Silver Spirit (1984)
- Rolls-Royce Silver Spur (1990)

=== Other marques ===
- Jaguar XK120 Roadster
- Jaguar E-Type 4.2
- Jaguar XJS
- Mercedes-Benz 190SL
- Mercedes-Benz 280SL
- Cadillac Roadster (1909)
- Cadillac Deville Cabrio (1970)
- Allen Runabout (1899)
- BS 8050 Gladiator (1900)
- Peugeot Bébé (1903)
- Buick Model 5 (1908)
- De Dion-Bouton (1908)
- Renault Tourer (1911)
- Ford Model T (1914)
- Ford T Tourer Race (1914)
- Fiat 501 Torpedo (1922)
- Bentley 3.5 Litre (1935)
- Camión de bomberos BMC (1936)
- Delaunay-Belleville 10 HP Roy Des Belges
- Wolseley Motors Limited Cabrio
- Hispano-Suiza K-6 (1936)
- Isotta Fraschini (1925)
- Lancia Aprilia
- Vauxhall 12 HP
- Vauxhall 14 HP
- MG TF 1500
- Austin-Healey 3000 MkIII (1965)
- Porsche 911 SC
- Lamborghini Countach
- Ferrari Testarossa
