= Alonso Álvarez de Pineda =

Spanish conquistador and cartographer

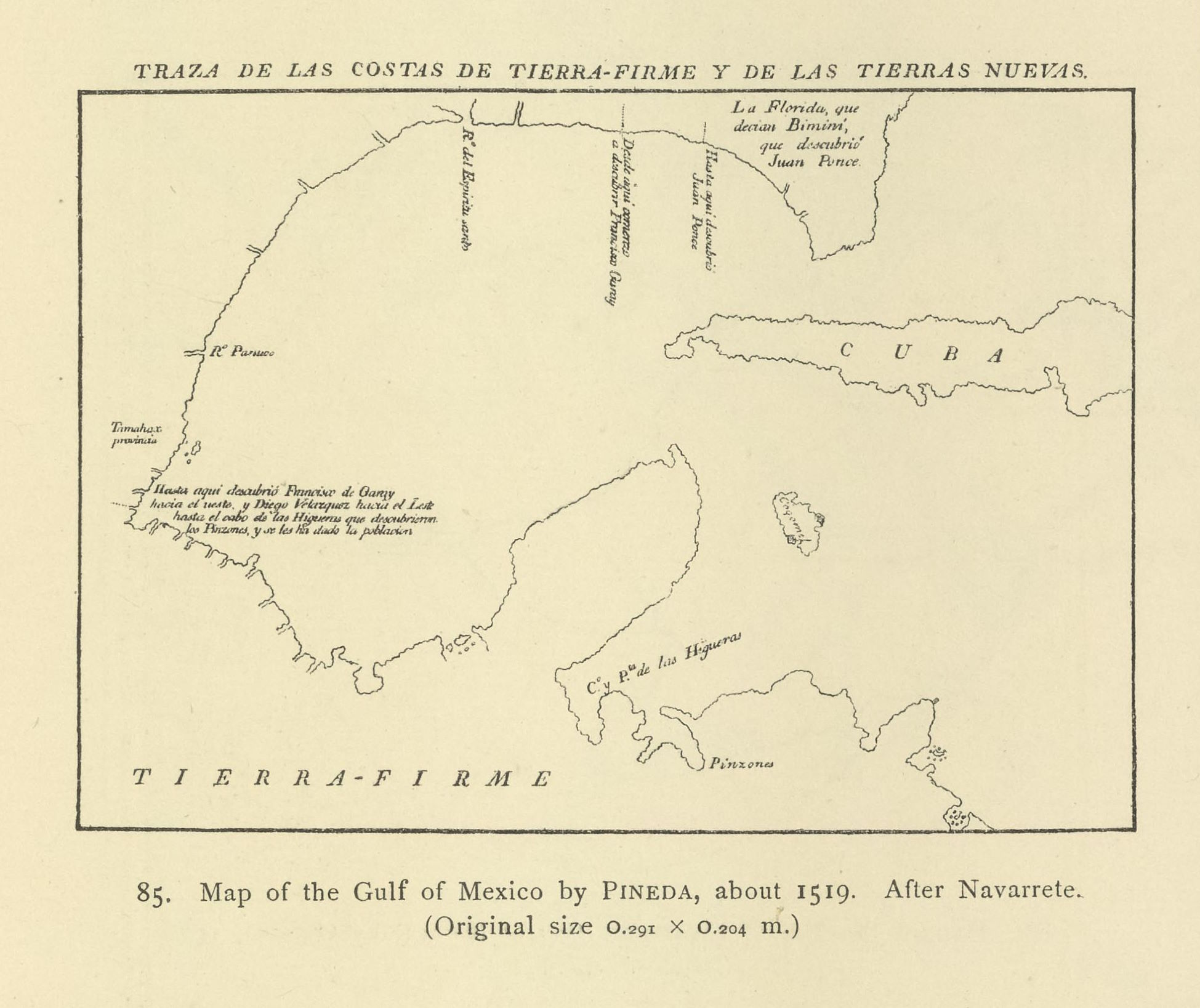
Facsimile of Álvarez de Pineda's 1519 map of the Gulf of Mexico

Alonso Álvarez de Pineda (Spanish: [piˈneða]; 1494–1520) was a Spanish conquistador and cartographer who was the first to prove the insularity of the Gulf of Mexico by sailing around its coast. In doing so he created the first map to depict what is now Texas and parts of the Gulf Coast of the United States.

== Life ==
Born in Aldeacentenera, Spain, in 1494, he led several expeditions in 1519 to map the westernmost coastlines of the Gulf of Mexico, from the Yucatán Peninsula to the Pánuco River, and also explored parts of Florida, which at the time was believed to be an island. Antón de Alaminos' explorations had eliminated the western areas as being the site of the passage, leaving the land between the Pánuco River and Florida to be mapped. An expedition was organized to chart the remainder of the Gulf. Francisco de Garay, Governor of the Colony of Santiago, outfitted three ships with two hundred and seventy soldiers and placed them under the command of Álvarez de Pineda, who left Santiago in early 1520 and sailed west to follow the northern coastline of the Gulf. At the western tip of southern Florida, he attempted to sail east, but the winds were not on his side. Somehow he did anchor off Villa Rica de la Veracruz shortly after Hernán Cortés had departed. Cortés returned on hearing of Álvarez de Pineda's arrival. Álvarez de Pineda wished to establish a boundary between the lands he was claiming for Garay and those that Cortés had already claimed; Cortés was unwilling to bargain, and Álvarez de Pineda left to retrace his route northward.

Shortly thereafter, he sailed up a river he named Las Palmas, where he spent over 40 days repairing his ships. The Las Palmas was most likely the Pánuco River near present-day Tampico, Tamaulipas, Mexico. Álvarez de Pineda was subsequently killed in a battle with the native Huastec people at the Pánuco River. Garay later sent two expeditions under Diego Camargo and Miguel Díez de Aux to find him, but they were unsuccessful, finding only his burned ships. Pineda's map did make it back to Governor Garay.

The expedition established the remainder of the boundaries of the Gulf of Mexico while disproving the idea of a sea passage to Asia. It also verified that Florida was a peninsula instead of an island. Álvarez de Pineda became the first European to see the coastal areas of what is now western Florida, Alabama, Mississippi, Louisiana, and Texas, lands he called "Amichel". He also sailed upriver on the Mississippi River, being credited with the discovery of this river. His map is the first known document of Texas history and was the first map of the Gulf Coast region of the United States. It is stored at the Archivo General de Indias in Sevilla (Spain).
