= Modesto Carriegas Pérez =

Spanish politician (1932 - 1979)

Modesto Carriegas Pérez (Arcentales, 1932 – Baracaldo, 1979) was a Spanish banking official and politician who was assassinated by the Basque separatist group ETA. He was the director of a Banco Hispano Americano branch in Baracaldo and stood as the second candidate on the Coalition Unión Foral del País Vasco list for the Congress of Deputies in the 1979 general election.

== Biography ==
Modesto Carriegas was born in Arcentales, Spain, in 1932. He was married and had five children. On 13 September 1979, at the age of 47, he was assassinated by members of ETA. He lived in Baracaldo, where he ran an office of the Banco Hispano Americano. He had attended as a candidate for the Congress of the Deputies of the coalition Unión Foral del País Vasco, occupying the second position of the list.

Earlier, on 27 January 1979, Modesto was the victim of an armed robbery and kidnapping by members of ETA at the bank where he worked. Four members of ETA entered the bank branch and stole ten million pesetas during the incident. The assailants took Carriegas to the Baracaldo railway station and forced him onto a train bound for Bilbao. Once they were there, they freed him in a bar, but not before warning him to stay there until nine a.m. The objective of taking him hostage was that the employees of the branch delayed the report of the theft

=== Murder ===
On 13 September 1979 Modesto left his house around 8 a.m., going to the Banco Hispano Americano's office. Three members of ETA participated in this attack, of whom two had hidden in the stairs that were going down to the basement of his home. Modesto was approached next to the elevator, where he was subsequently shot four times from close range, two hitting the head and two the stomach. There were no eyewitnesses of the facts even though his neighbours and relatives listened to the four detonations with clarity. The employees from a bank branch located in the adjoining portal came to help him, he was found with one hand on the stomach. José Reparaz Fernández also went to his aid, a doctor and neighbour of the deceased, who had heard the shots in a kiosk near the place of the scene. Shortly after his own wife came down, alerted by the gunshots. He was taken by ambulance to the hospital of Cruces, where he entered without life.

The assassins had stolen at gunpoint a white Seat 127 in the town of Portugalete, Biscay, about an hour before the attack. The owner was forced to give them the keys and received orders not to give an account of the events until a few hours has passed. It was in this car that the third individual was waiting for them to flee after making the shots. After the attack, this vehicle was found by the National Police in Portugalete. After the murder, the Modesto Carriegas's family received a letter from ETA in which they were required to leave Baracaldo.

On 26 December 1979, the Spanish National Court provisionally closed the investigation into Carriegas's assassination, citing a lack of conclusive evidence to bring charges against specific individuals. Two days after the killing, ETA's military wing released a communiqué in which it claimed responsibility for the attack. The procedural situation of this assassination is of provisional dismissal. Therefore, the material authors of the attack have not been condemned, nor have been an investigation that attributes these facts to any member of the terrorist group ETA.

== Bibliography ==
- MERINO, A., CHAPA, A., Raíces de Libertad. pp. 29–39. FPEV (2011). ISBN 978-84-615-0648-4
- This article makes use of material translated from the corresponding article in the Spanish-language Wikipedia.
