= Francisco de Garay =

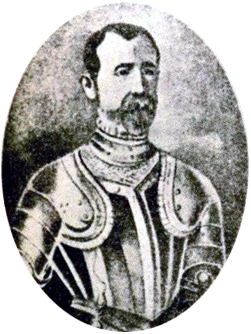
Francisco de Garay

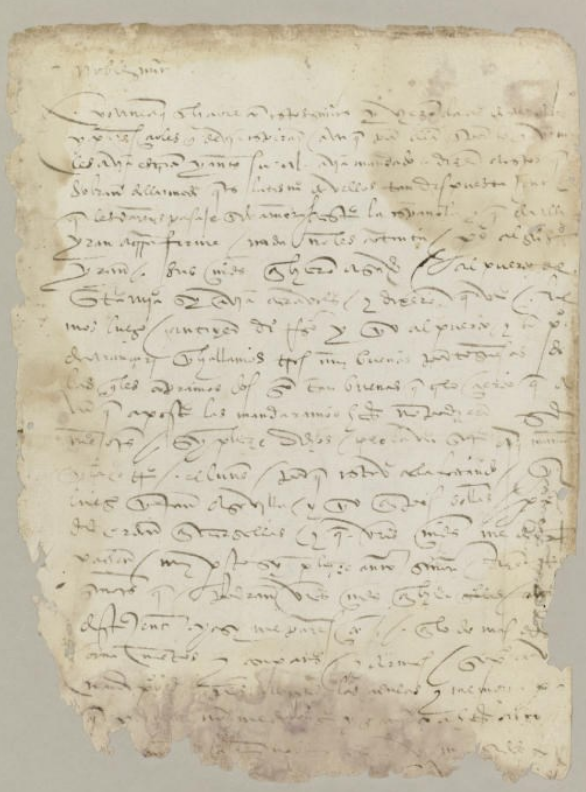
Francisco de Garay to Ochoa de Isasaga

Francisco de Garay (1475 in Sopuerta, Biscay – 1523) was a Spanish Basque conquistador.

== Early life ==
Garay was born in the Garay tower in Sopuerta, in the county of Encartaciones located in the province of Biscay. He was a companion to Christopher Columbus on his second voyage to the New World and arrived in Hispaniola in 1493. Here he attracted attention when he encountered a large gold nugget worth four thousand pesos. In 1496, Miguel Díez and Francisco de Garay found gold nuggets along the Haina River. Díez later fathered the first mestizo in America, Miguel Díez de Aux, who became Garay's explorer.

== Jamaica ==
From 1514 to 1523, Garay served as Royal Governor of Santiago, now Jamaica (Governor of Jamaica). As a Governor of Santiago, he was accused of enslaving the island's indigenous population to work in the gold mines of Cuba. Writing in 1516, Bartolomé de Las Casas accused him of being responsible for the great decline of the indigenous population. By 1519, the original population of Jamaica was almost eradicated. He also raised pigs during his governorship, at one point employing five thousand indigenous to herd his swine.

== Expeditions ==
Garay sent several expeditions to explore, map and claim lands along the shores of what is now the Gulf of Mexico from present day Florida to Mexico. In 1519 Garay sent an expedition under Alonso Álvarez de Pineda to map the coast between Florida and the northern limit of the lands visited by Diego Velázquez de Cuéllar. The Mississippi River was shown on the maps as Rio del Espiritu Santo (River of the Holy Spirit). Garay later sent Díez de Aux and Diego Camargo to try to find Pineda, but he had been killed by hostile natives.

In 1523, Garay led a 600-man expedition to found a colony on the Panuco River near present-day Tampico. However, he landed by mistake 100 miles north at the mouth of the Soto La Marina River which he called the River of Palms (Rio de las Palmas). He reconnoitered by sending a small boat upriver about 25 miles, probably reaching the site of the present day city of Soto la Marina. The explorers found 40 Indian encampments along the river, indicating a large population, although the Indians apparently did not practice agriculture. The Indians plied the river in canoes and, although initially friendly, became hostile. Realizing that the river was not the Pánuco, Garay ordered an overland march southward to the Panuco.

Garay's efforts to found a colony led him into legal conflict with Hernán Cortés.

While in Mexico City negotiating with Cortés, he became ill and died on December 27, 1523.

== Bibliography ==
- Floyd, Troy (1973). The Columbus Dynasty in the Caribbean, 1492-1526. Albuquerque: University of New Mexico Press. pp. 4, 32, 73, 109–110, 130–138, 164. ISBN 0826302831.
- Eugenio Del Hoyo; Historia del El Nuevo Reino De Leon (1577-1723)
- Weddle, Robert S. (1985). Spanish Sea : The Gulf of Mexico in North American Discovery : 1500-1685. College Station, Tex.: Texas A & M University Press. ISBN 0-89096-211-1.
- Weddle, Robert S. (2016) [1952]. "Garay, Francisco de". Handbook of Texas Online. Texas State Historical Association (TSHA).

Government offices
Preceded by Juan de Esquivel	Governor of Santiago (Jamaica); 1514–1523	Succeeded by Pedro de Mazuelo
