= Balmaceda =

Balmaceda may refer to:

- The Balmaceda family, politically influential family of Chile, including:
  - José Manuel Balmaceda, former president of Chile
  - José Rafael Balmaceda, politician and diplomat
- Giliana Balmaceda, Special Operations Executive agent in WW II.
- Balmaceda (spider), a genus of jumping spiders
- Balmaceda, Chile, a village in Chile
- Balmaceda Airport in Chile
- Balmaceda Park, urban park in Chile
- Balmaseda, a Spanish town
