= Karrantza =

Coordinates: 43°12′21″N 3°21′48″W

Karrantza Harana/Valle de Carranza
- Municipality
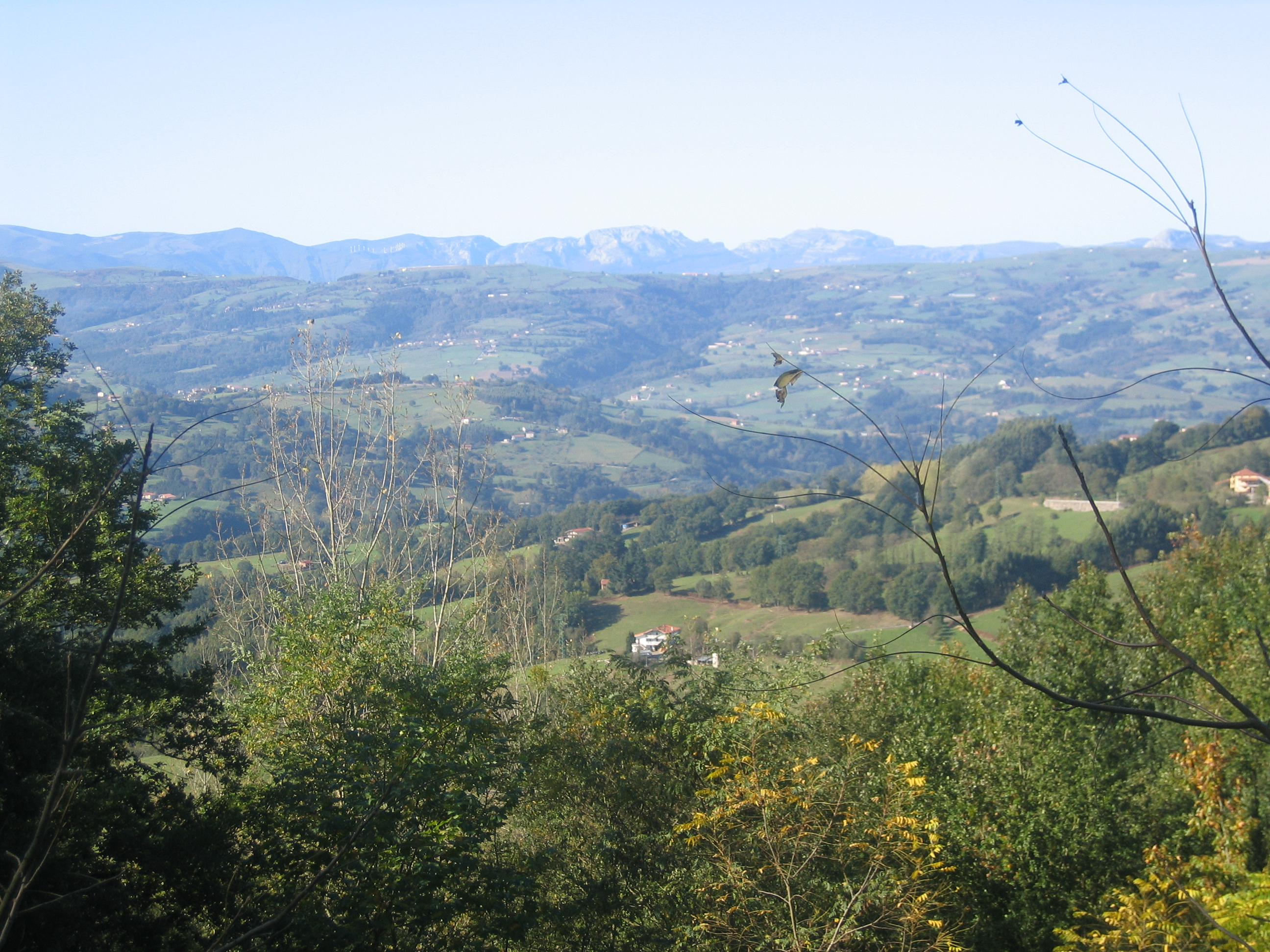
- Karrantza Harana/Valle de Carranza

- Flag Coat of arms

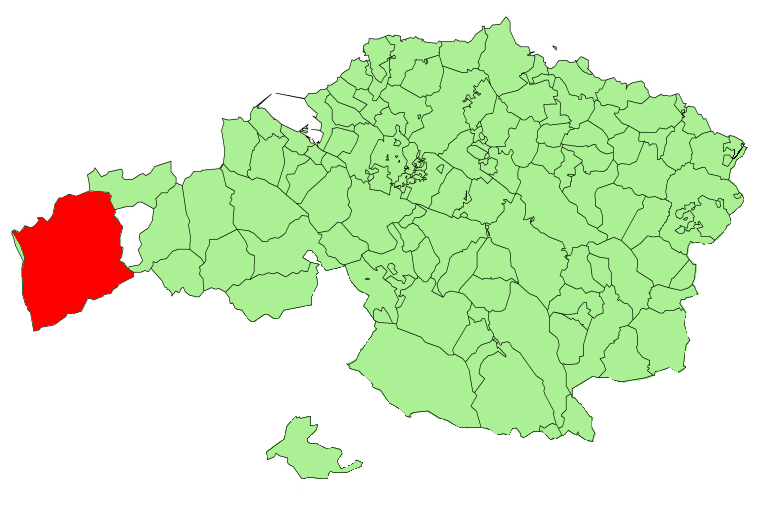
- Location of Karrantza within Biscay
- Country: Spain
- Autonomous community: País Vasco
- Province: Biscay
- Comarca: Enkarterri
- Established: 1287

Government
  - Mayor: Raúl Palacio (KZ)

Area
  - Total: 137.87 km^{2} (53.23 sq mi)
- Elevation: 155 m (509 ft)

Population (2025-01-01)
  - Total: 2,715
  - Density: 19.69/km^{2} (51.00/sq mi)
- Time zone: UTC+1 (CET)
  - Summer (DST): UTC+2 (CEST)
- Postal code: 48891
- Website: Official website

Karrantza Harana/Valle de Carranza (in Basque Karrantza Harana, in Spanish Valle de Carranza), is a town and municipality located in the province of Biscay, in the Basque Country. It is located in the comarca of Enkarterri and it is the westernmost and largest (by area) municipality of the province.

Film director Víctor Erice was born there.

== Etymology ==
The first recorded appearance of the toponym of Carranza is on the Chronicle of Alfonso III, dated in the 10th Century, where it appears as Carrantia. According to the text, Carrantia was one of the towns known to be populated during the reign of Alfonso I, King of Asturias. The origin of Carrantia comes from the Cantabrian dialect, meaning "high rocks". From Carrantia it would evolve to Carranza, the current Spanish toponym. Karrantza is the Basque toponym, an adaptation of Carranza following the Basque orthographic rules, and it is the official name of the municipality since 2001.

== History ==
The first known vestiges of the human presence in the valley of Karrantza are some lithic tools, from the late Middle Paleolithic. In Karrantza is located the sanctuary of Venta Laperra, the oldest of the entire Basque Country, with several forms of Paleolithic art. There is evidence of ancient pastoral activity, as well as art forms belonging to hunter-gatherers from the Neolithic and the Bronze Age.

The oral traditions tells of the presence of Romans in the lands of the valley, which were interested in the exploitation of galena from the Ubal mountains. Diggings effectuated in some of the caves within the municipality revealed Roman pottery. In 1903 more than one hundred Roman coins were found, all dated from 238 to 260.

The first records about the valley of Karrantza are from the 8th Century, when the King of Asturias Alfonso I was conducting a series of resettlements on the Atlantic region of the Iberian Peninsula, as they were mentioned in the Chronicle of Alfonso III one century later.

The valley of Karrantza was incorporated to the Lord of Biscay in the 12th Century. It belongs to the territory of the Enkarterri, which was itself incorporated to Biscay in the 13th Century.

== Population ==
- 1900 - 4,237 people
- 1910 - 4,463 people
- 1920 - 4,506 people
- 1930 - 4,458 people
- 1940 - 4,479 people
- 1950 - 4,687 people
- 1960 - 4,490 people
- 1970 - 3,953 people
- 1981 - 3,392 people
- 1991 - 3,149 people
- 2001 - 2,887 people
- 2004 - 2,884 people
- 2009 - 2,810 people
- 2018 - 2,715 people

== Geography ==
Karrantza is located in the westernmost part of the Enkarterri region and is the largest (by area) of all the municipalities of Biscay. Karratza is 54 kilometers away from the head of province Bilbao and limits at north by the autonomous community of Cantabria, at east mostly with the Cantabrian exclave of Villaverde de Trucios, and the Basque municipalities of Turtzioz and Artzentales, at south with the province of Burgos and at west with the tiny municipality of Lanestosa and the Cantabrian community.

== Sports ==
The Karrantza CD football club is the most important sport club. It is in regional categories of Basque football.
