= Miguel Díez de Aux =

Conquistador and first mestizo in the history of the Americas

- Born: 1496; Haina, Hispaniola
- Died: c.1560 New Spain
- Military career
- Allegiance: Spanish Empire
- Service years: 1519–1541
- Rank: Captain
- Conflicts: Siege of Tenochtitlan

Miguel Díez de Aux y Haina, known as "The Younger" (1496, Haina - c. 1560, New Spain) was a Spanish mestizo conquistador. Born in Hispaniola to a Spanish father and Taíno mother, he later served under Hernán Cortés in the conquest of the Aztec Empire and retired with great wealth. He is considered the first documented mestizo in the history of the Americas.

== Early life ==
He was born in Hispaniola. His father, Miguel Díez de Aux the Elder, hailed from the Aragonese lower nobility and served as Bartholomew Columbus' servant in his 1494. The Elder and five other conquistadors had run away from the settlement of La Isabela after he mortally wounded another Spaniard in a duel, leading them to plant their own settlements in the Haina area of the island, along with the Ozama River. There he married by the native rite a Taíno chieftainess who got later baptized as Catalina, eventually giving birth to Miguel the Younger. He was their second child, after a first one who died soon. Aux learned from the indigenous about the existence of gold and farmable land, leading him and his family to return to La Isabela, where he was exonerated from his crime thanks to his findings and the fact that his opponent hadn't died as Aux believed.

== Expeditions to mainland ==
While Aux the Younger was educated, his father was recruited by Francisco de Garay to return to Catalina's lands and establish an official settlement, later renamed Santo Domingo, current capital of the Dominican Republic. Aux the Elder and Garay became immensely wealthy thanks to their newfound gold mines, leading the former to be appointed alcaide and alguacil mayor of the Fuerte de Santo Domingo. In July 1510, he was arrested and sent to Spain by Juan Ponce de León on accusations of cruelty against the natives, but he was declared innocent and returned to Hispaniola the following year. He did so while married to a Christian woman, although he retained his mestizo son as his heir. Aux the Elder originally wished for his son to study and become a Catholic priest, but the Younger preferred to become a conquistador like him.

The Younger joined Francisco de Garay in his exploration of Jamaica. In 1521, two years after his father's death, he was sent by Garay to the continent at the head of a rescue fleet to find Alonso Álvarez de Pineda, who had gone missing in his own expedition in the Pánuco River. This was but the second attempt to find Pineda, the first being one headed by Diego Camargo, future father of mestizo chronicler Diego Muñoz Camargo. Aux failed to find Pineda, who had been killed by Huastecs, and after skirmishes with those, he eventually desisted and headed to Veracruz to reinforce the expedition of Hernán Cortés, who was at the time preparing the siege of Tenochtitlan.

== Career in New Spain ==
Díez joined Cortés with his 50 soldiers and seven horses. His squadmates were jokingly nicknamed los de los lomos recios ("the Wide-Backed Ones") because they had gained weight due to their more comfortable life in Jamaica. He coincidentally found there Camargo's expedition, which had also joined Cortés, although Camargo was ill and would die soon. Another expedition leader, Francisco Ramírez, also met them there. Aux commanded one of the Spanish brigantines during the siege of Tenochtitlan, the first showing in a career as a land conquistador in which, according to comrade and chronicler Bernal Díaz del Castillo, he served excellently in a long list of conquests.

In 1541, Díez sued Cortés' brother-in-law Andrés de Barrios, whom he accused of having capitalized on his connections to illegitimately receive lands in Metztitlan which belonged to Aux, while Barrios accused him of murdering native chieftains of said lands. The tribunal of the Council of the Indies, presided by García de Loaysa y Mendoza, was initially unfavorable to Aux due to his eccentric manners, which saw Aux lying down on the ground on his cape and pointing his dagger to his own throat while asking the judges to execute him on the spot if he was lying. Loaysa had Aux expelled from the room, but he ultimately declared him right and ordered part of the lands' tribute to be directed to Aux to compromise with the accusation, under the condition he was banished from them for two years.

According to chronicler Francisco Cervantes de Salazar, Díez died very rich in Ciudad de México. He left two daughters as his heirs.

== Bibliography ==
- G. Fernández de Oviedo, Historia general y natural de las Indias, Islas y Tierra-Firme del mar Océano, Madrid, Imprenta de la Real Academia de la Historia, 1851–1855
- R. Esteban Abad, Estudio histórico-político sobre la Ciudad y Comunidad de Daroca, Teruel, Instituto de Estudios Turolenses, 1959
- B. Díaz del Castillo, Historia verdadera de la conquista de la Nueva España, Madrid, edición crítica de Carmelo Sáenz de Santamaría, 1967
- V. Rubio, OP, Diario El Caribe, Santo Domingo (República Dominicana), April 41992
- M. Fuertes de Gilbert Rojo, “El barbastrense Miguel Díaz de Aux y el primer oro de las Indias”, Annales XVII, Anuario del Centro de la Universidad Nacional de Educación a Distancia, Barbastro (Zaragoza) 2004.
