= Gordexola =

- Municipality
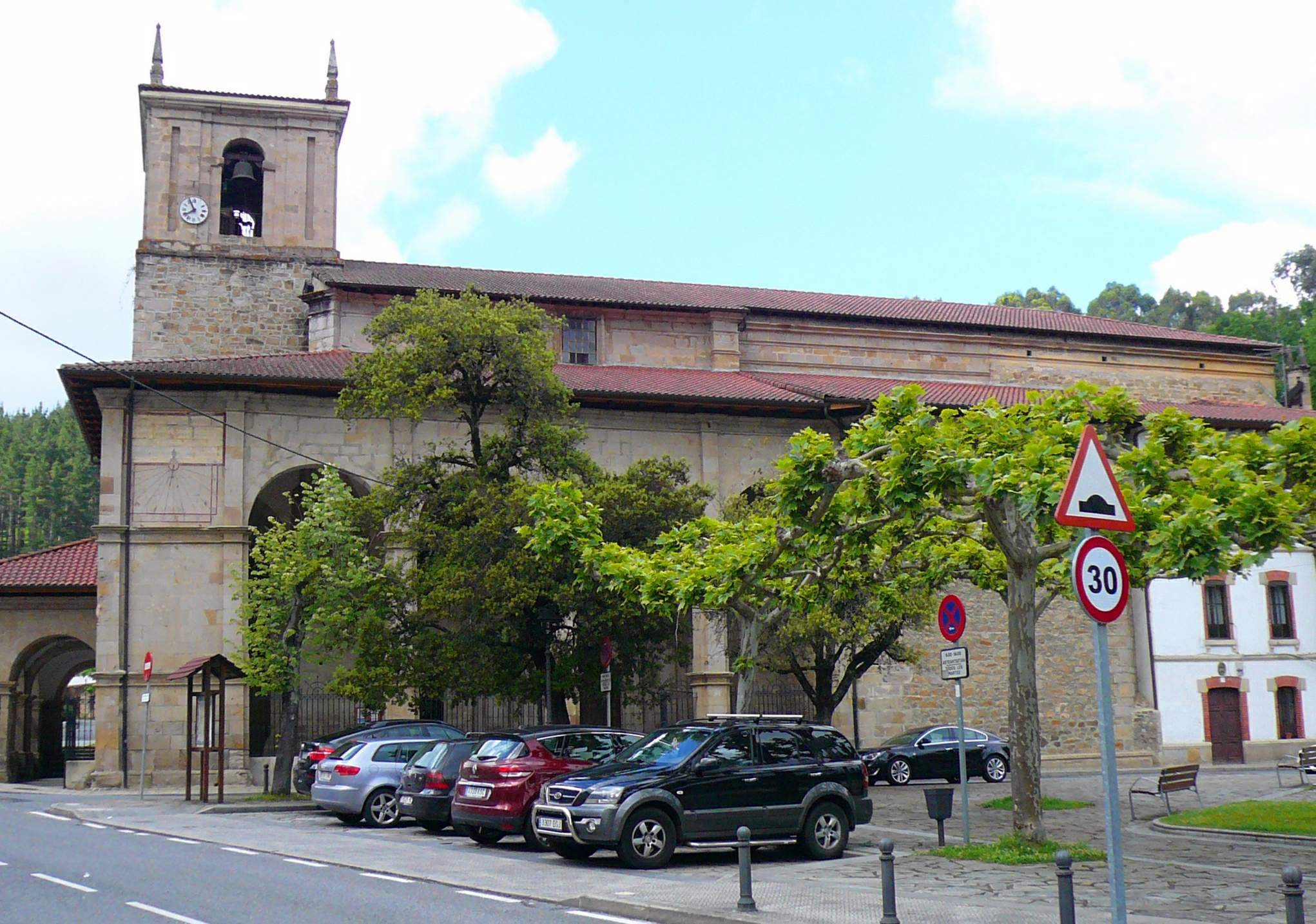
- Church of San Juan del Molinar

- Flag Coat of arms

- Location in Spain
- Coordinates: 43°10′43″N 3°4′22″W
- Country: Spain
- Autonomous community: Basque Country
- Province: Biscay
- Comarca: Enkarterri

Government
  - Mayor: Iñaki Aretxederra Zurimendi

Area
  - Total: 40.97 km^{2} (15.82 sq mi)
- Elevation: 78 m (256 ft)

Population (2025-01-01)
  - Total: 1,720
  - Density: 42.0/km^{2} (109/sq mi)
- Demonym: Gordexolatarra
- Time zone: UTC+1 (CET)
  - Summer (DST): UTC+2 (CEST)
- Postal code: 48192
- Website: Official website

Gordexola is a town and municipality located in the province of Biscay, in the autonomous community of Basque Country, northern Spain.
