= Ortuella =

- Municipality
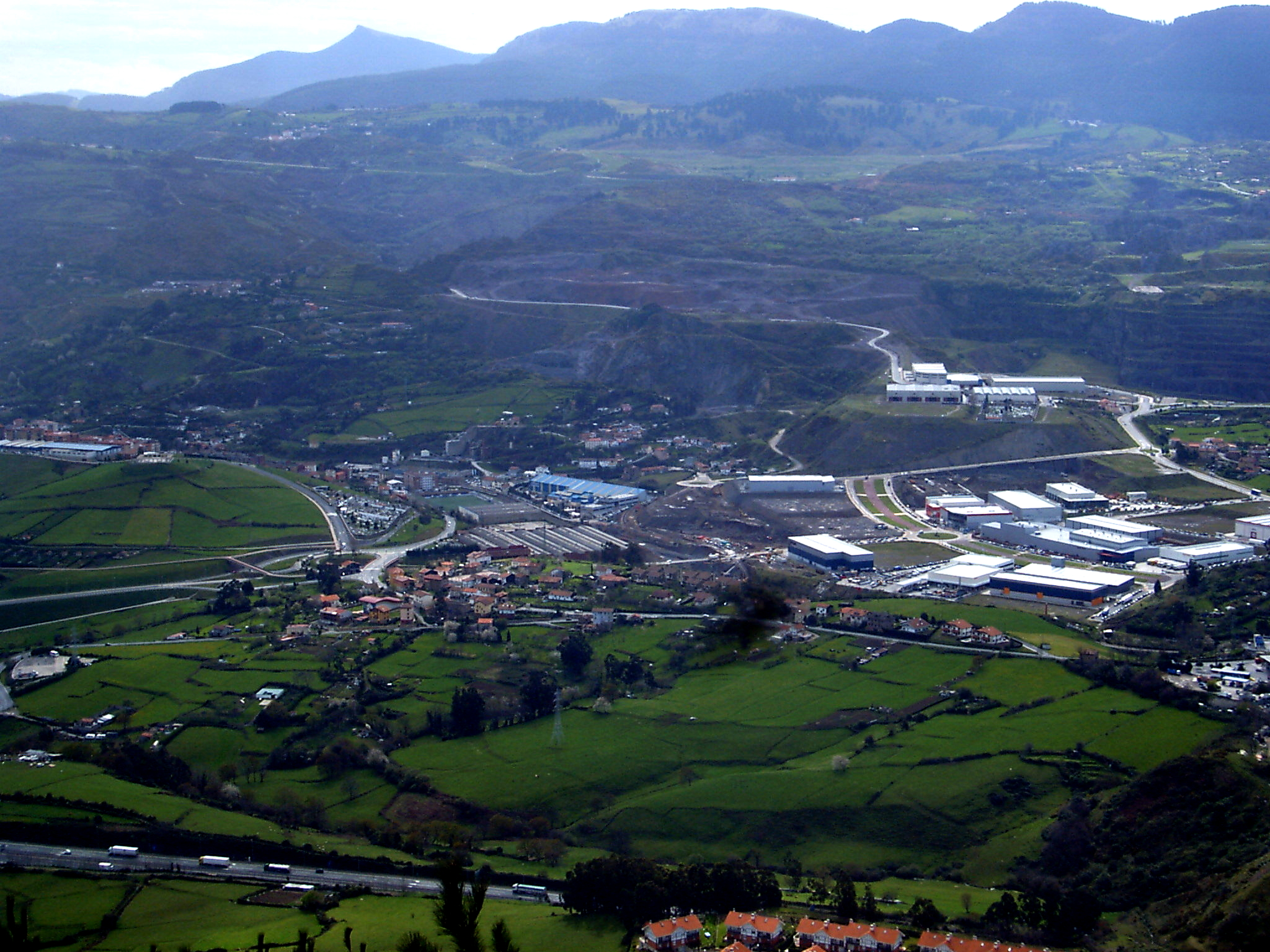
- View from Serantes

- Coat of arms

- Location of Ortuella within the Basque Country
- Coordinates: 43°18′37″N 3°3′25″W
- Country: Spain
- Autonomous community: Basque Country
- Province: Biscay
- Comarca: Greater Bilbao
- Segregated: 1901

Government
  - Alcalde: Oskar Martínez Zamora (EAJ-PNV)

Area
  - Total: 7.65 km^{2} (2.95 sq mi)
- Elevation: 66 m (217 ft)

Population (2025-01-01)
  - Total: 8,735
  - Density: 1,140/km^{2} (2,960/sq mi)
- Demonym: ortuellatarra
- Time zone: UTC+1 (CET)
  - Summer (DST): UTC+2 (CEST)
- Postal code: 48530
- Official language(s): Basque
- Website: Official website

Ortuella is a town and municipality located in the province of Bizkaia, in the Autonomous Community of Basque Country, northern Spain.

Nowadays part of the Greater Bilbao region, until the beginning of the 19th century it was integrated in the Valley of Somorrostro of Enkarterri along with Santurtzi. In 1901 the locality segregated from the municipality of Santurtzi, becoming known as Santurce-Ortuella. This segregation was motivated by an increase of population due to the mining boom at the end of the 19th century, which saw the district of Ortuella become the most populous part of the municipality. In the 1980s, and by means of the resolution of 27 March 1981, the name of the municipality definitively lost the term "Santurce", simply being "Ortuella", which was the usual name used by their citizens.

Ortuella was the site of a deadly explosion at the Marcelino Ugalde Primary School on 23 October 1980 that killed 50 schoolchildren and 14 adults, and injured killed and injured an additional 128.

The patron saint of Ortuella is Saint Felix of Cantalica (18 May), the name of the main church of the municipality.

== Neighborhoods ==
Ortuella is administratively divided into 6 neighbourhoods or wards (population figures as of 2010):

- Cadegal (Pop. 46)
- Orconera (Pop. 39)
- Nocedal (Pop. 204)
- Ortuella (Pop. 7.475)
- Triano (Pop. 10)
- Urioste (Pop. 803)

== Demography ==
Population of Ortuella
1897	1900	1910	1920	1930	1940	1950	1960	1970	1981	1991	2001	2006
*	*	5,041	5,528	6,060	5,688	5,681	7,633	8,011	9,100	8,976	8,684	8,618

== Notable people ==
- Joseba Agirre, footballer
- José Arechavaleta, botanist
- Pepeo Calleja, footballer
- Florencio Constantino, operatic tenor
- Juan Antonio Ipiña, football manager
