= Enkarterri =

Coordinates: 43°14′38″N 3°11′44″W

- Eskualdea / Comarca
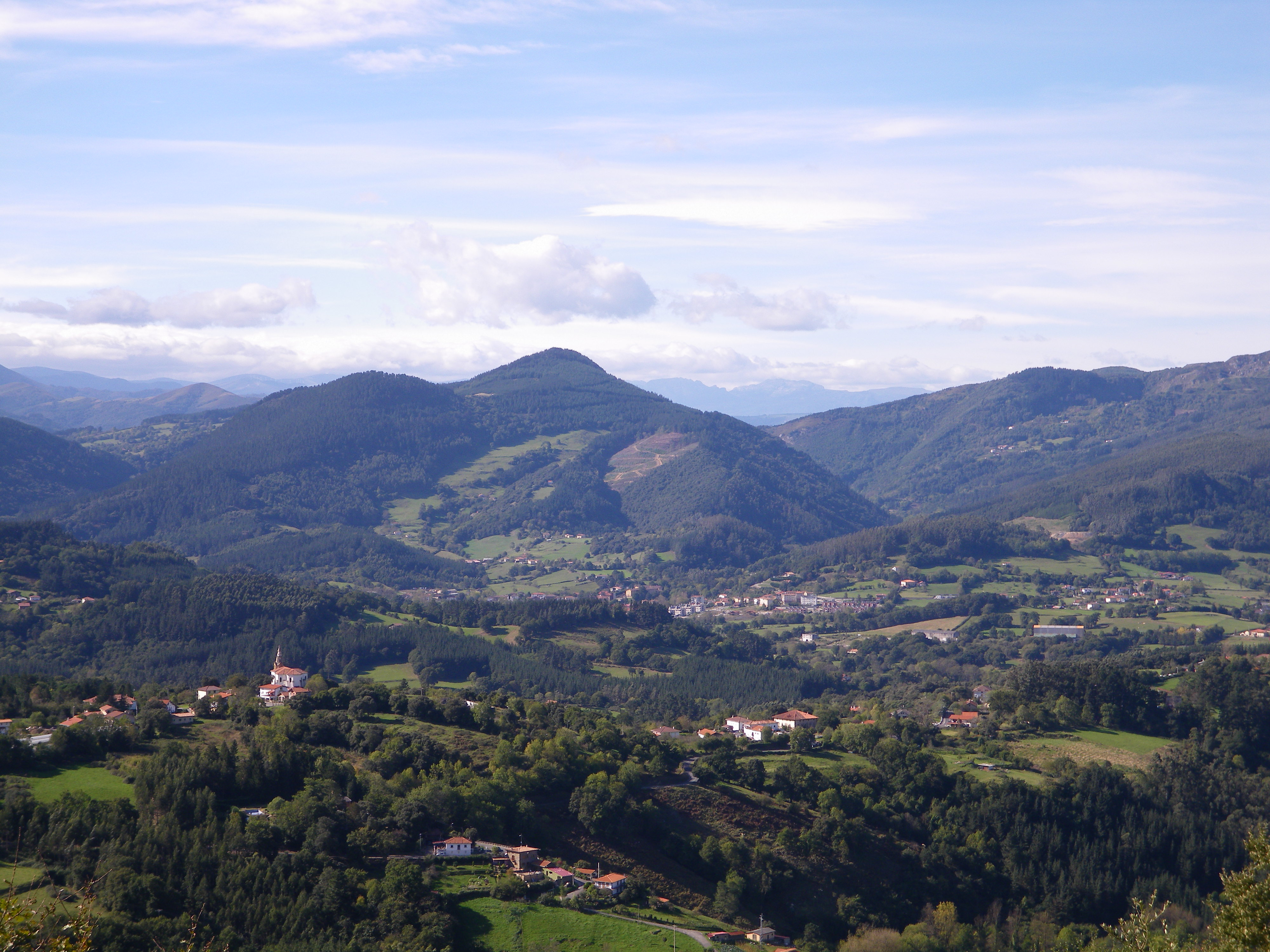
- Neighbourhoods of Sopuerta and Galdames as viewed from Pico Mayor

- Coat of arms

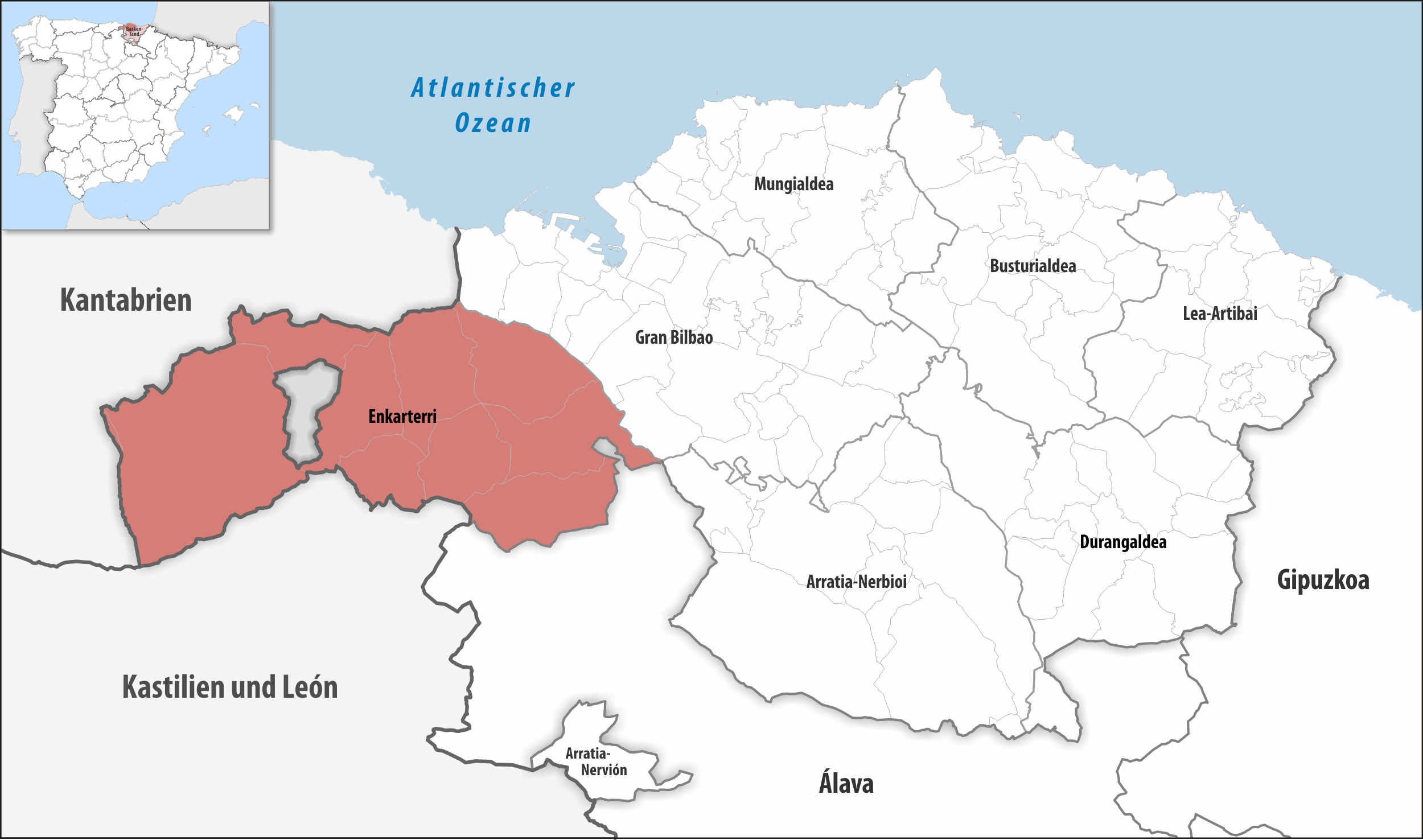
- Location of Enkarterri in Biscay
- Country: Spain
- Autonomous community: Basque Country
- Province: Biscay
- Municipalities: List: Artzentales, Balmaseda, Galdames, Gordexola, Güeñes, Karrantza, Lanestosa, Sopuerta, Trucios-Turtzioz, Zalla

Population
  - Total: 32,277
- Demonym: encartados
- Time zone: UTC+1 (CET)
  - Summer (DST): UTC+2 (CEST)

Enkarterri (Spanish: Las Encartaciones) is a comarca of the province of Biscay, in the Basque Country, Spain. It is one of the seven eskualdeak/comarcas or districts that make up the province of Biscay. Its administrative centre is Balmaseda.

Historically a larger region (merindad), Enkarterri stretched from the mountains that form its southern border with Cantabria and Castile-Leon in the west and south, to the river Nervión and the Estuary of Bilbao in the east – including the industrial municipalities of Gallarta, Muskiz, Ortuella, Portugalete, Santurtzi, Sestao, Trapagaran and Zierbena. Nowadays the name usually refers only to the rural western part of the historical territory, while the eastern urban area is known as the Left Bank (Margen Izquierda / Ezkerraldea) and is part of the Greater Bilbao comarca (together with Barakaldo, which used to belong to the neighbouring merindad of Uribe).

== Geography ==
Enkarterri is located at the northwest of the province of Biscay. It borders the community of Cantabria to the west, and the Province of Burgos (Castile and León) and the province of Álava, also in the Basque Country, to the south. The river Kadagua crosses the region and drains most of it.

== Municipalities ==
#	Municipality	Area km^{2}	Population	% of Population
	Balmaseda	22.3	7,168	20.15
	Karrantza	137.70	2,836	9.16
	Artzentales	36	692	2.23
	Gueñes	41.49	8,176	25.44
	Zalla	31.03	8,183	26.30
	Sopuerta	42.80	2,439	7.88
	Galdames	44.50	841	2.72
	Gordexola	41.50	1,658	5.35
	Trucios-Turtzioz	31	556	1.80
	Lanestosa	1.20	305	0.98
	Enkarterri	429.52	32,713	100.00
