= Aldeacentenera =

Coordinates: 39°32′N 5°38′W

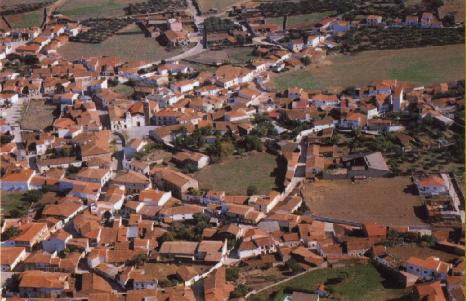
- View of Aldeacentenera

- Flag Coat of arms

- Location in Spain.
- Country: Spain
- Autonomous community: Cáceres

Area
  - Total: 110.56 km^{2} (42.69 sq mi)
- Elevation: 565 m (1,854 ft)

Population (2025-01-01)
  - Total: 603
  - Density: 5.45/km^{2} (14.1/sq mi)
- Time zone: UTC+1 (CET)
  - Summer (DST): UTC+2 (CEST)
- Website: www.aldeacentenera.es

Aldeacentenera is a village in the province of Cáceres and autonomous community of Extremadura, Spain. The municipality covers an area of 110.56 square kilometres (42.69 sq mi) and as of 2011 had a population of 733 people.

== See also ==
- List of municipalities in Cáceres
