= Cadagua =

River in Spain

Coordinates: 43°17′13″N 2°58′17″W

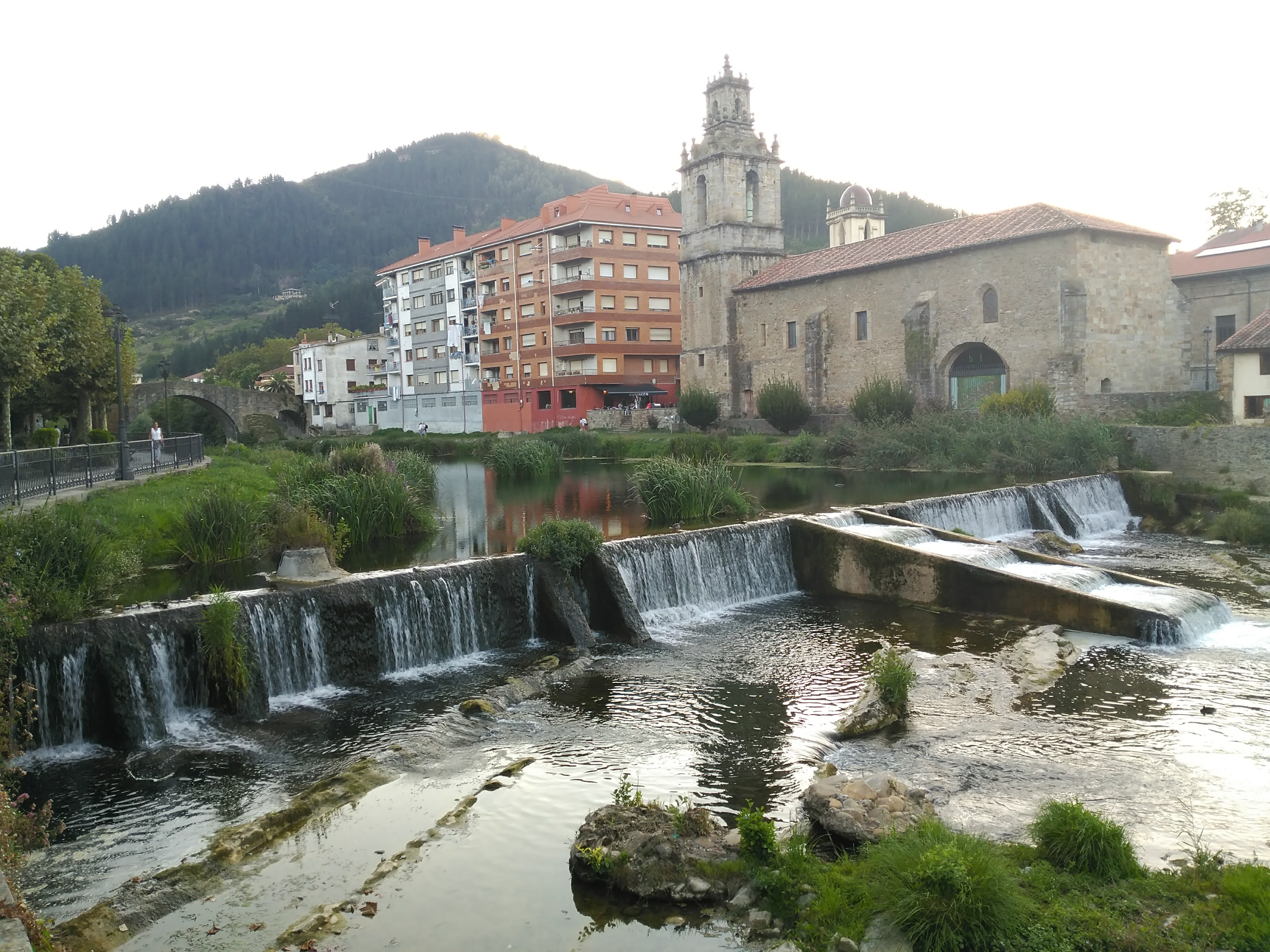
The Kadagua river in Balmaseda

The Cadagua or Kadagua River drains the Biscayan area of Encartaciones (Basque: Enkarterriak), from the Castilian valley of Mena to Barakaldo and Bilbao, where it forms the border between these municipalities and ends at the Estuary of Bilbao. Another important town that this river crosses is Balmaseda.

The river takes its name from the small village where is located its first spring. Cadagua village is located in Valle de Mena (Burgos, Spain) surrounded by the beautiful landscape of "La Peña" mountains.

Four small hydropower plants produce electricity thanks to the river Cadagua. Until the last decades of the 20th century, this water power was also used by several mills that can be seen nowadays in the river basin.

Cadagua is a company that took its name from this river. This company designs, plans and builds water treatment plants in order to improve the environment. Its main tributaries are the Ordunte on the left bank and the Herrerías on the right bank.

== See also ==
- List of rivers of Spain
