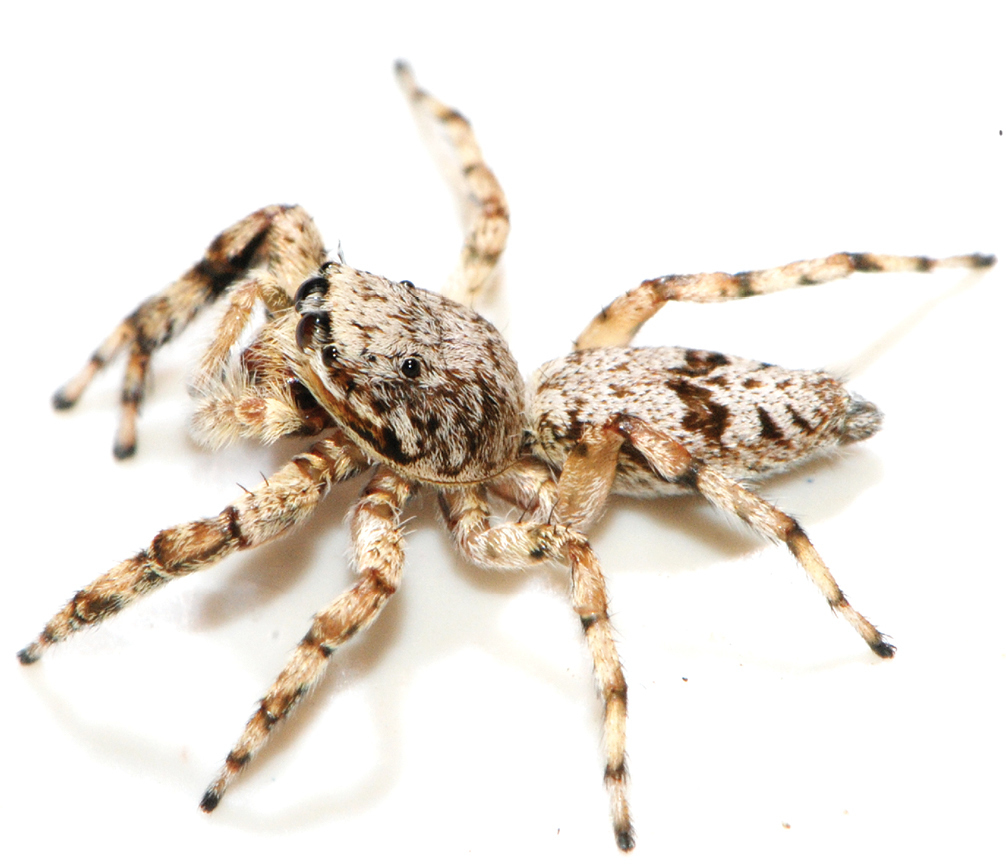
- Balmaceda nigrosecta

Scientific classification
- Kingdom: Animalia
- Phylum: Arthropoda
- Subphylum: Chelicerata
- Class: Arachnida
- Order: Araneae
- Infraorder: Araneomorphae
- Family: Salticidae
- Subfamily: Salticinae
- Genus: Balmaceda; Peckham & Peckham, 1894

Type species
- B. picta Peckham & Peckham, 1894

Species
- 11, see text

= Balmaceda (spider) =

Genus of spiders

Balmaceda is a genus of jumping spiders that was first described by George Peckham & Elizabeth Peckham in 1894.

== Distribution ==
All species of Balmaceda are found in Central America or South America. At least one species, Balmaceda minor, also ranges northwards into Mexico.

== Species ==
As of January 2025 it contains eleven species:

- Balmaceda abba Edwards & Baert, 2018 – Ecuador (Galapagos Is.)
- Balmaceda anulipes Soares, 1942 – Brazil
- Balmaceda biteniata Mello-Leitão, 1922 – Brazil
- Balmaceda chickeringi Roewer, 1951 – Panama
- Balmaceda distans (Banks, 1924) – Ecuador (Galapagos Is.)
- Balmaceda minor (F. O. Pickard-Cambridge, 1901) – Mexico to El Salvador
- Balmaceda nigrosecta Mello-Leitão, 1945 – Colombia, Argentina
- Balmaceda picta Peckham & Peckham, 1894 (type) – Guatemala to Colombia
- Balmaceda reducta Chickering, 1946 – Panama
- Balmaceda turneri Chickering, 1946 – Panama
- Balmaceda vera Mello-Leitão, 1917 – Brazil
