= Zalla =

- Municipality
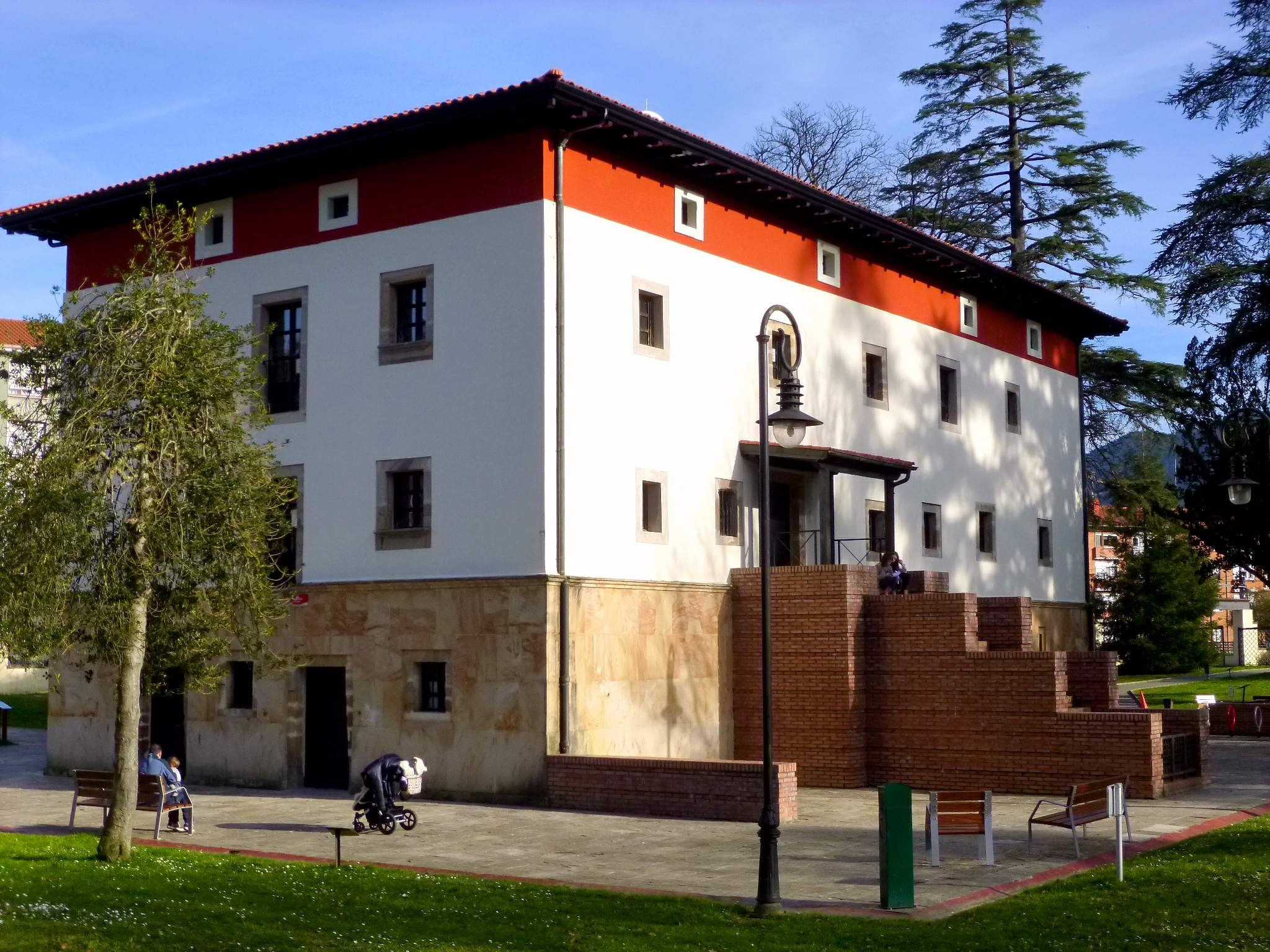
- Zalla town hall

- Flag Coat of arms

- Location of Zalla within the Basque Country Zalla (Spain)
- Coordinates: 43°12′51″N 3°07′52″W
- Country: Spain
- Autonomous community: Basque Country
- Province: Biscay
- Comarca: Enkarterri
- Founded: 12th century

Government
  - Mayor: Juanra Urkijo Etxeguren (PNV)

Area
  - Total: 31.03 km^{2} (11.98 sq mi)
- Elevation: 96 m (315 ft)

Population (2025-01-01)
  - Total: 8,334
  - Density: 268.6/km^{2} (695.6/sq mi)
- Demonym: Spanish: zallense
- Time zone: UTC+1 (CET)
  - Summer (DST): UTC+2 (CEST)
- Postal code: 48860; 48850; 48869
- Website: Official website

Zalla is a town and municipality located in the province of Biscay, in the Autonomous Community of the Basque Country, northern Spain, 24 kilometers to the southwest of Bilbao. The river Cadagua runs through the city. According to the 2019 census, it has 8,447 inhabitants.

== Popular culture ==
The Zallense people are known for their popular culture and especially for their mythology. In Zalla, superstitions and beliefs in evil supernatural beings, sorcerers and witchcraft were widespread.

The hermitage of San Pedro Zariquete was a pilgrimage center against the evil eye and against demons. Thousands of devotees who believed themselves possessed by evil spirits in search of the corresponding exorcism passed through the year. The rite was to go to the chapel on the day of the saint on a path (while throwing handfuls of salt), and return on the other, so that the evil spirits did not re-enter the disemboweled person.

== Notable people ==
- José de Urrutia y de las Casas: military, cartographer and engineer (s. XVIII).
