= Lanestosa =

Coordinates: 43°12′55″N 3°26′13″W

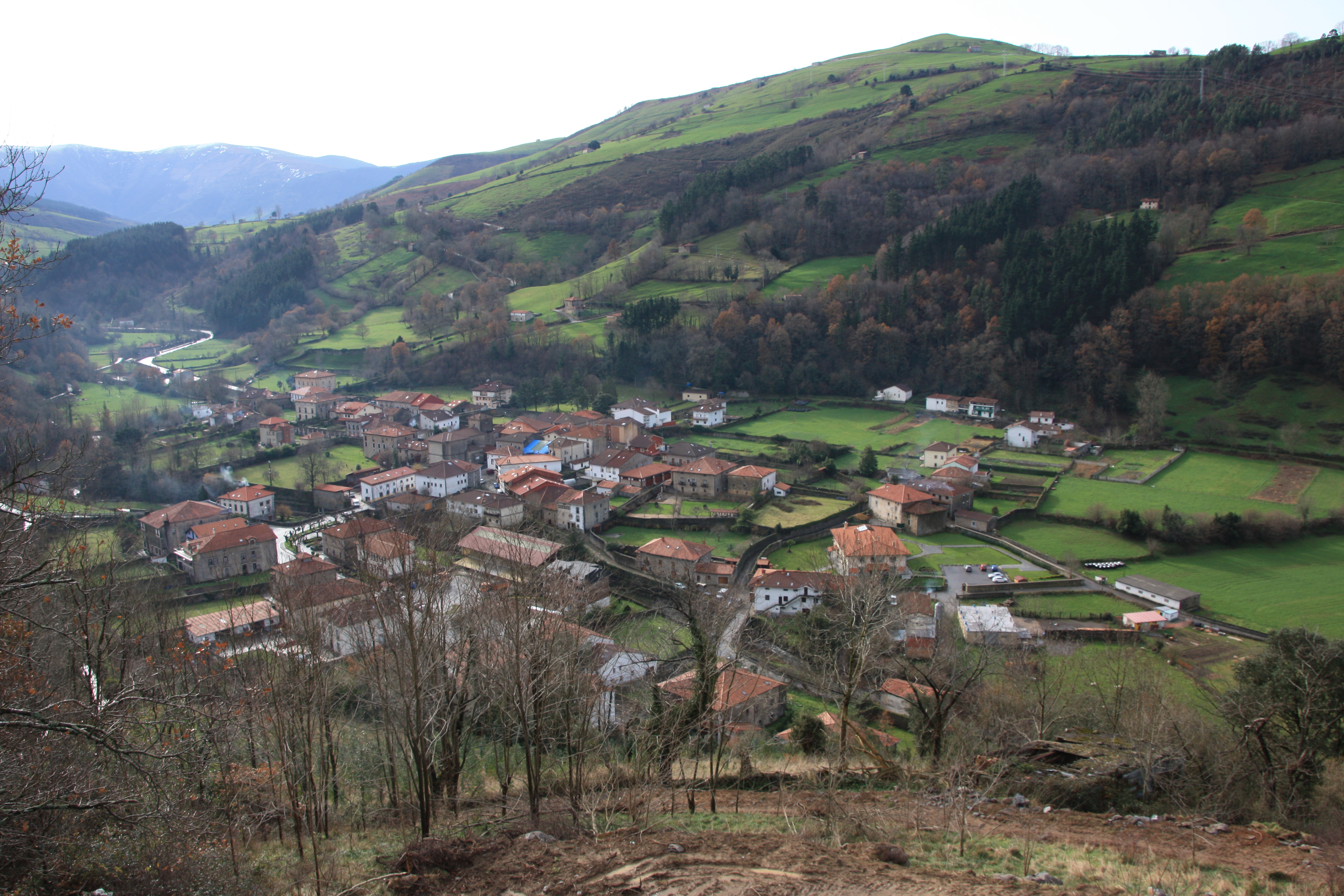

- Coat of arms

- Location in Spain.
- Country: Spain
- Autonomous community: Biscay

Area
  - Total: 1.31 km^{2} (0.51 sq mi)
- Elevation: 287 m (942 ft)

Population (2025-01-01)
  - Total: 244
  - Density: 186/km^{2} (482/sq mi)
- Time zone: UTC+1 (CET)
  - Summer (DST): UTC+2 (CEST)
- Website: www.lanestosa.eus

Lanestosa is a town and municipality located in the province of Biscay, in the autonomous community of Basque Country, northern Spain. It is a little municipality in the very west of Basque Country.
