= Güeñes =

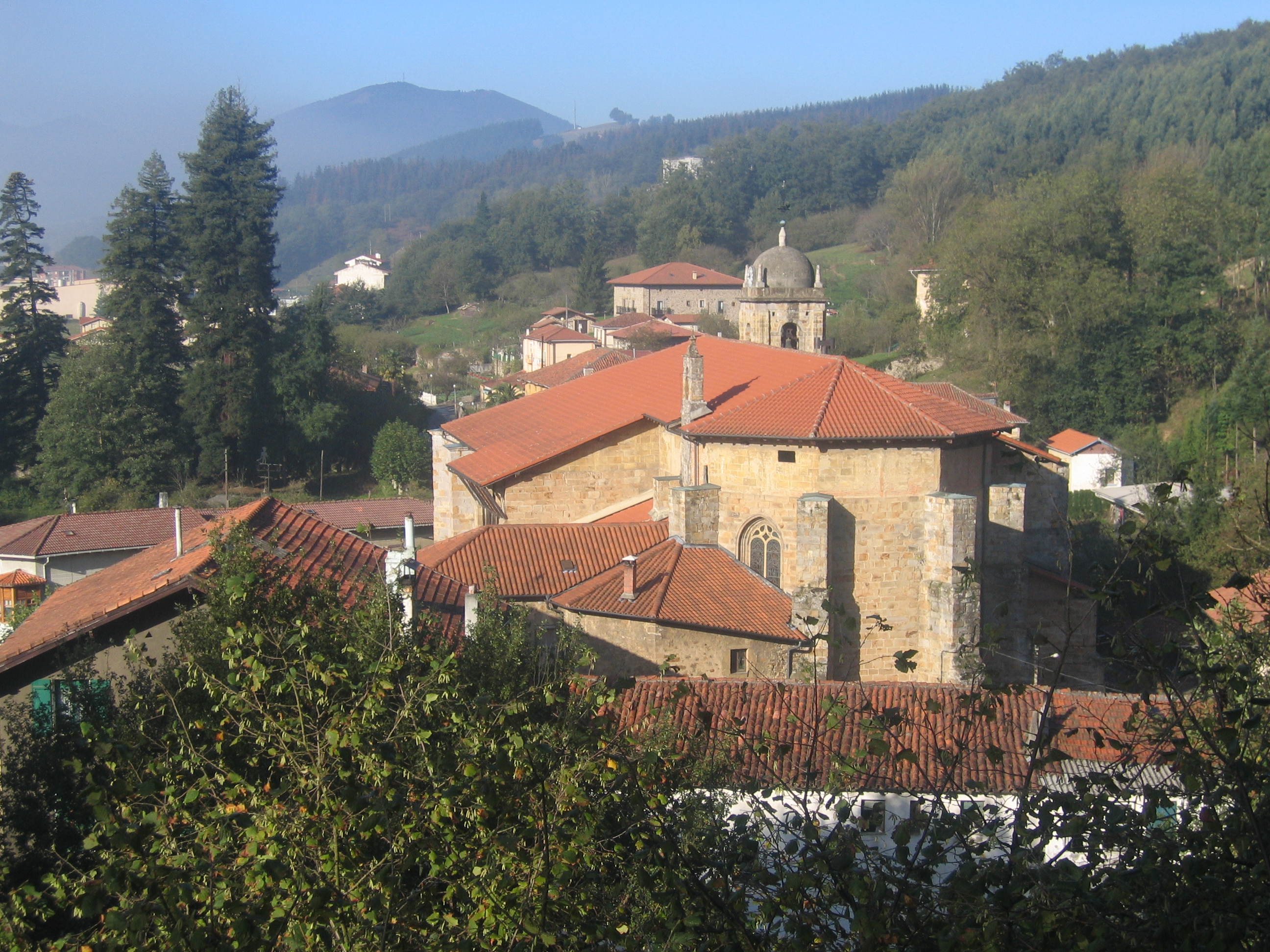
- Church of St. Mary

- Flag Coat of arms

- Location of Güeñes within the Basque Country
- Coordinates: 43°12′50″N 3°5′39″W
- Country: Spain
- Autonomous community: Basque Country
- Province: Biscay
- Comarca: Enkarterri

Government
  - Mayor: Imanol Zuluaga Zamalloa

Area
  - Total: 41.16 km^{2} (15.89 sq mi)
- Elevation: 81 m (266 ft)

Population (2025-01-01)
  - Total: 6,817
  - Density: 165.6/km^{2} (429.0/sq mi)
- Demonym: Güeñés
- Time zone: UTC+1 (CET)
  - Summer (DST): UTC+2 (CEST)
- Postal code: 48840
- Website: Official website

The council of Güeñes is a municipality in the county of Encartaciones (Biscay, Basque Country, Spain). It is furrowed by the waters of the river Cadagua and forms with its neighbor, the municipality of Zalla, Salcedo Valley. In the North it borders Galdames and k; in the east Alonsotegi (Greater Bilbao);in the west the municipality of Zalla and in the south the municipality of Gordejuela. Its more important centres of population are Güeñes, Sodupe, The Quadra, Zaramillo, Sanchosolo and San Pedro de Goicouría.

== Geography ==
The towns of Sodupe, La Quadra, Zaramillo and the administrative centre, Güeñes, all lie within the region.

== Population cores in the region ==
- Central Güeñes - 2213
- La Quadra (Basque: Quadra-Lakabex) - 420
- Sodupe - 5117
- Zaramillo - 510
- Total 8.258 - (INE 2011).

== History ==
In ancient times, it was included in the Valley of Salcedo, formed by two councils: Güeñes and Zalla. The valley of Salcedo was founded in the late 12th century by Count D. Rubio Diaz de Asturias, who ordered the building of the Tower of Salcedo of Aranguti, which was later on transformed into a palace. He was succeeded by his daughter Maria de Salcedo, married to D. Galindo de Ayala, Mr. of Ayala. Ayala and Salcedo would remain together for the rest of the 12th century and the first half of the 13th century, under the successive domination of Sancho Garcia "the headstrong" and Hurtado Sanz. They were not, however, the only eminent "owners" of the valley: other characters wielded power in the area, such as Martin Sancho de Santa Marina. In the early 13th century, Hurtado Sanz de Salcedo, (6th Lord of Ayala), had a daughter who had two bastard children with Martin Sanchez of Santa Marina: Lope Sanchez, who received Gordexola as inheritance and Sancho Ortiz Marroquin, who kept Zalla and Güeñes.

A generation later, Marroquin divided among three of his four children all their possessions in Salcedo, thus giving rise to three lineages; Montermoso Marroquin, La Jara and Salcedo Salcedo Aranguren. In the valley of Salcedo direct clashes began at a relatively late date, during the mid-14th century. Relationships between different lineages were difficult. Many of their differences seem to have started from Sancho Ortiz Marroquin's territorial divisions. Despite the opposition from Salcedo, Montermoso still had effective control of the region, especially after the death of Juan Sanchez, and the Marroquines' territorial demands also began to increase.

All sides were well defended, and they all fought tirelessly for the control of the region: zamudianos of Salcedo, Salazares and Muñatones on one hand and marroquines and gordojanos on the other. By 1400, the Salazar Salcedo quarreled with and allied with the marroquines. The atmosphere of generalized violence endured all over the territory, forcing the lords of Vizcaya and kings of Castile to take action on the matter. It was difficult to impose rules, when the lieutenants of the nobles inevitably used them for their own profit. Therefore, it became necessary to resort to outsiders. Violence began to subside during the last years of the 15th century. There was a change in economic conditions, and both production and population increased: the causes that had led to struggle began to disappear. During the first half of the 16th century, disputes concerning neighbouring municipal borders were resolved: In January 1507, the councils of Güeñes and Gordejuela gathered to mark their respective terms and limits, in order not to contravene the jurisdiction of its justices. On February 27 in the same year, the representatives of these councils proceeded to the demarcation. During this period of time, iron production and the expansion of cultivated areas acquired a very important role. Güeñes also featured another engine that underpinned its demographic expansion: the works of the church of Santa Maria, which provided work for a good number of workers.

On April 17, 1624, the General Meeting of the Lordship of Biscay, contemplating the possibility of an attack by Dutch ships, decided to fortify the ports and coasts and appoint captains in all the villas and parish churches of Vizcaya. In September 1642, Mr. Jacinto Hurtado de Tavisón, permanent mayor of the council of Güeñes, asked for the full incorporation of Güeñes into his manor.

In 1704 there were 202 fires in Güeñes, emerging from a "fogueramiento" (boundary marking fire) continuing throughout this year. This fire was started by the General Meeting of the manor on 28 June, in order to mark the divisions of the estate. From the outbreak of 1766, Güeñes suffered a long series of bad harvests, strong fiscal demands, wars and diseases. This growth forced the regiment to suppress direct taxes between 1772 and 1775 and spread land among neighbours, so that they could increase their resources. The Board of Merindades of 13 August 1799 had determined the full incorporation of the Encartaciones to the Lordship and had approved the conditions of such a union. On 25 May 1800, authorities of the council of Güeñes met in the City Hall. On February 2 a committee was appointed to be responsible for conferring with the authorities of the manor. On 14 July 1800, the General Meetings of Guernica ended up incorporating the Lordship of Güeñes. In the War of 1808 a Gallic detachment settled its headquarters in Sodupe, causing a major upheaval: the war absorbed a high percentage of local agricultural production as "rations" for troops.

== Politics ==
The Basque Nationalist Party (EAJ/PNV) has been governing Güeñes for the last 37 years. These are the elected mayors to date:

- 1979-1983 Pedro María Saracho Cortajarena
- 1983-1987 Manuel Jarrín Totorica
- 1987-1991 Jose María Larrucea Ulibarri
- 1991-2003 Guillermo Ibarra Vitorica
- 2003-2015 Koldo Artaraz Martín
- 2015-now Imanol Zuluaga Zamalloa

== Notable people ==
- Jacinto de Romarate, distinguished Marine who defended Montevideo from the patriot siege in the American War of Independence.
- Daniel Ruiz Bazán, (retired) football player of Athletic Club during the 1970s and 1980s. Born in Sodupe.
- Rosa Díez, politician. She was a tourism minister in the Basque Government, PSOE eurodeputy, deputy in the Spanish parliament and founder of the Union Progreso y Democracia political party. Born in Sodupe.
- Lorenzo de Arrieta Mascarua Sarachaga (1821-1891): politician and member of parliament.
- José Miguel de Arrieta Mascarua Sarachaga (1817-1869): politician and member of parliament.

== Monuments and heritage ==
The following are some of the most important monuments and interest places in the territory of Güeñes:

- Errecalde farmhouse: It is an example of the typical country house Gable, one of the oldest in the municipality which preserves its original facade. In this restored example, the ground floor is used as a stable, first floor to live and the last is a birdhouse.
- Palace of the Hurtado de Amézaga: It was built in the 18th century by don Baltasar Hurtado de Amezaga, first Marqués de Riscal. He constructed the palace with the help of the Guipuzcoan Martín de Zaldúa, who in 1709 joined in Güeñes to check the progress of the works. The death of the Marquis, however, stopped the works, and since then the Palace has been ruining is up till nowadays. It is included in the red list of world heritage in danger.
- St. Vincent Church: Completed in the 18th century, with three naves and four sections defined by pillars, highlights because of its own unadorned style, typical in the Baroque.
- Sanchosolo chapel: This temple, dedicated to San martin de Iturriag, has a vaulted nave of the 18th century.
- Saratxaga palace: 11th-century palace of the Saratxaga family. It has neo-classical influence and a garden.
- Cuadra Salcedo Palace: It is on the site of an old palace from the beginning of the 16th century. Its traces are still preserved, with a neo-classical order, composed in an oblong block closed presenting its main facade to pedestrians in the ancient Camino Real.
- Arenatza Park: English style park of 22,000, m2 with both autochthonous and allochthonous examples, as well as a sample of conifers, pond and pergola.
- The Bridge tower: This Romarate tower was built by D. Juan de Bolívar. Currently preserves its crenellated and the four watchtowers at its corners.
- La Cuadra tower: One of the Tower House of Vizcaya which have better kept original features. It was built in the second half of the 14th coinciding with intensification of feudal struggles.
- Sanchosolo tower:It is known since 1535, D. Lope I De Salcedo Lord of the Tower of Salcedo, cede to his first-born, D. Lope II De Salcedo, the gallows and the Tower of the Santxosolo watchtower.
- Sologuchi tower: Example of defensive Tower, strategically located next to the Royal Road, belonging to the Lords of Salcedo.
- Villa Urrutia: It is a mansion of Indians in French style. Built at the beginning of century by Leandro Urrutia and ceded by the family Garay Llaguno in 1974.
- St. Michael Lacabe Church: The Church was built in 1520. Later, in the 18th century its Renaissance dome was rebuilt.
- St Maria Church: The monumental Church of St. Maria was built in the 16th century. The temple has both Gothic and Renaissance elements.
