= Trucios-Turtzioz =

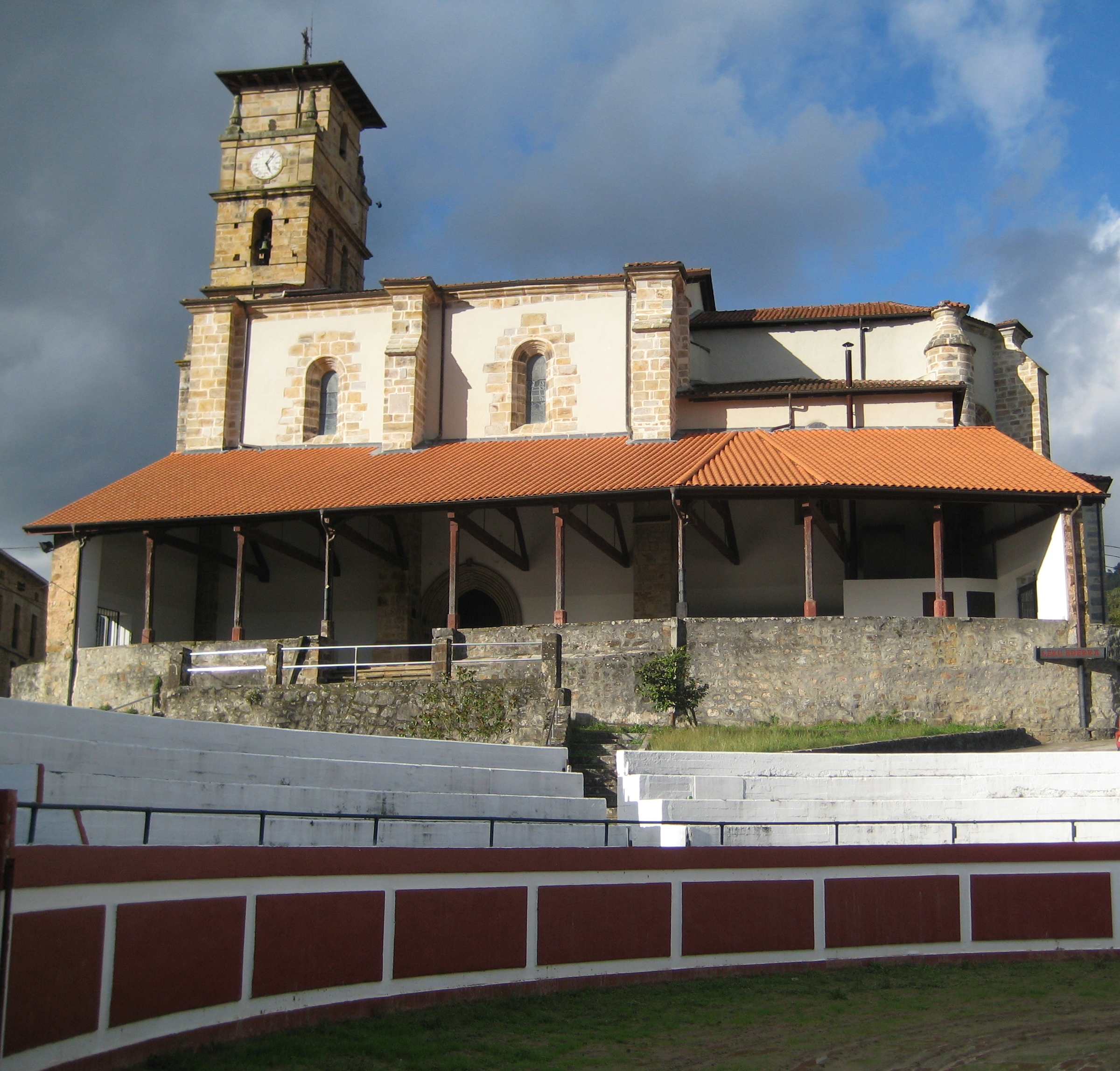
- Church of Saint Peter of Romaña in Trucios-Turtzioz

- Flag Coat of arms

- Location of Amoroto within the Basque Country
- Coordinates: 43°17′02″N 3°16′49″W
- Country: Spain
- Autonomous community: Biscay

Government
  - Mayor: José Manuel Coterón Fernández

Area
  - Total: 31.12 km^{2} (12.02 sq mi)
- Elevation: 152 m (499 ft)

Population (2025-01-01)
  - Total: 515
  - Density: 16.5/km^{2} (42.9/sq mi)
- Time zone: UTC+1 (CET)
  - Summer (DST): UTC+2 (CEST)
- Website: www.turtzioz.org

Trucios-Turtzioz (Turtzioz in Basque; Trucios in Spanish; Trucíos in Cantabrian) is a town and municipality located in the province of Biscay, in the Autonomous Community of Basque Country, northern Spain, surrounded by other municipalities of Biscay and Cantabria.

The name comes from a cold water spring, which existed, or still exists, in the center of the town. In Basque, Iturriotz means "cold spring".
