= Sopuerta =

- Municipality
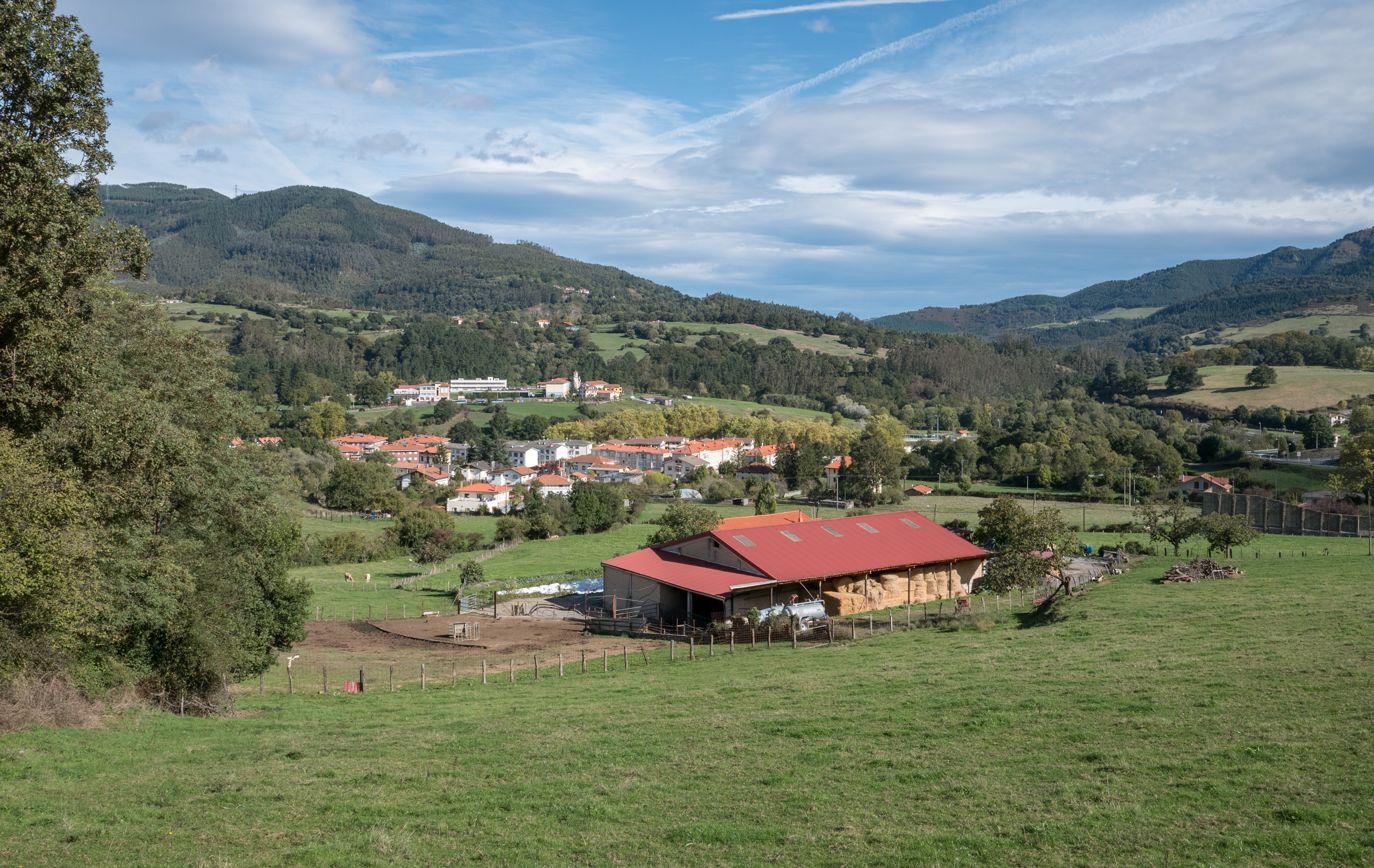
- View of Sopuerta

- Coat of arms

- Location of Sopuerta within the Basque Country
- Coordinates: 43°15′46″N 3°09′09″W
- Country: Spain
- Autonomous community: Basque Country
- Province: Biscay
- Comarca: Enkarterri

Government
  - Mayor: Joseba Andoni Llaguno Hurtado (Bildu)

Area
  - Total: 42.8 km^{2} (16.5 sq mi)
- Elevation: 86 m (282 ft)

Population (2025-01-01)
  - Total: 2,820
  - Density: 65.9/km^{2} (171/sq mi)
- Demonym(s): Spanish: soportano soportana
- Time zone: UTC+1 (CET)
  - Summer (DST): UTC+2 (CEST)
- Postal code: 48190
- Official language(s): Basque; Spanish
- Website: Official website

Sopuerta is a town and municipality located in the province of Biscay, in the Autonomous Community of Basque Country, northern Spain.

Conquistador Francisco de Garay was born in the Garay tower in Sopuerta.

== Neighborhoods ==
Sopuerta is administratively divided into 12 neighborhoods or wards:

- Mercadillo (Sokortua)
- Alen
- Arenao
- Avellaneda
- Baluga(Boluaga)
- Olabarrieta
- Bezi
- Castaño
- Jarralta
- Las Muñecas
- Las Ribas
- Carral

== Demography ==
Population of Galdames
| 1897 | 1900 | 1910 | 1920 | 1930 | 1940 | 1950 | 1960 | 1970 | 1981 | 1991 | 2001 | 2006 |
|---|---|---|---|---|---|---|---|---|---|---|---|---|
| 2,220 | 2,847 | 4,391 | 4,308 | 3,586 | 3,367 | 2,881 | 3,006 | 2,328 | 2,189 | 2,160 | 2,245 | 2,361 |
