= Artzentales =

- Municipality
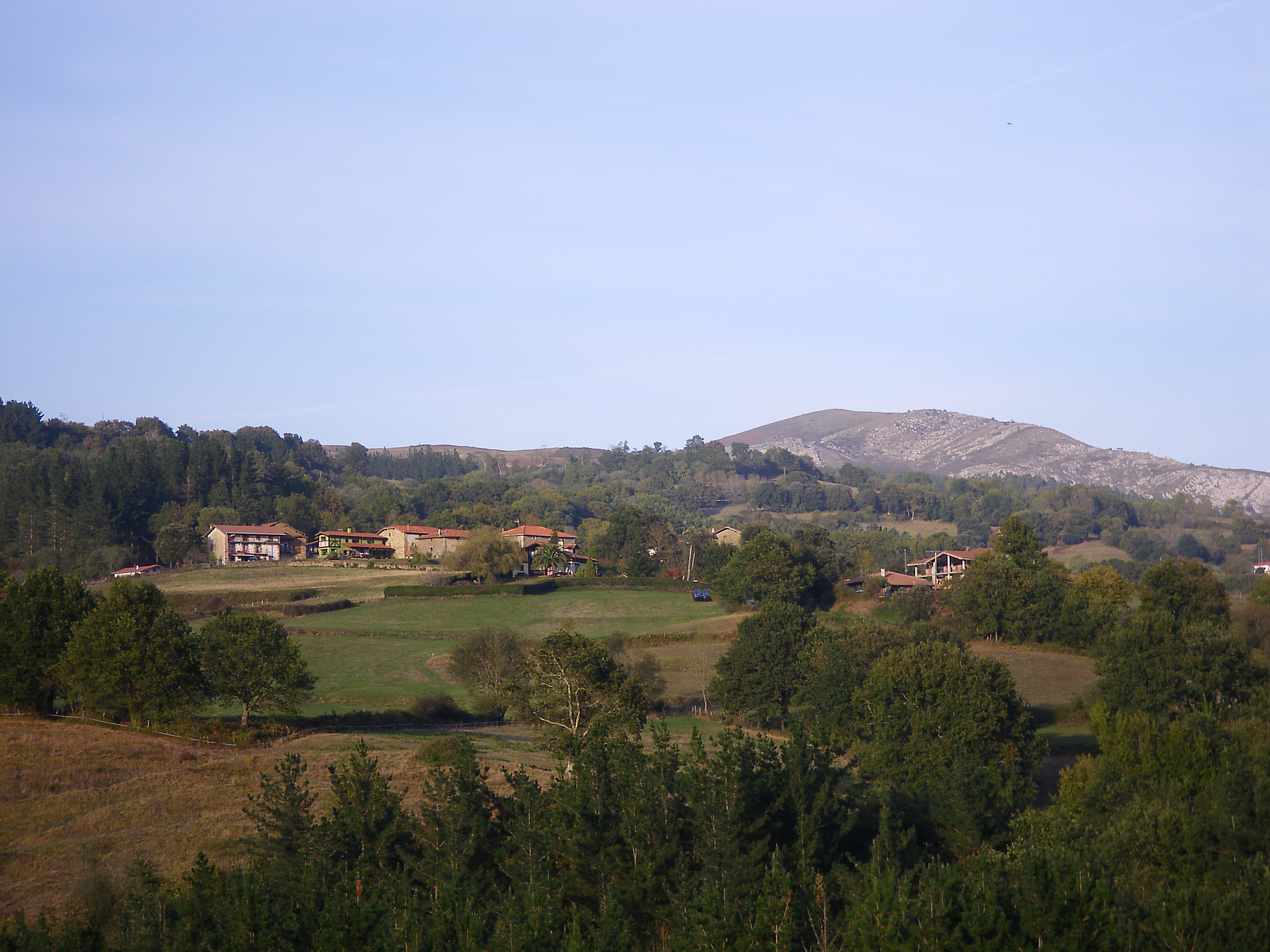

- Coat of arms

- Location of Artzentales within the Basque Country
- Coordinates: 43°14′26″N 3°13′41″W
- Country: Spain
- Autonomous community: Basque Country
- Province: Biscay
- Comarca: Enkarterri

Government
  - Mayor: Joxe Ignacio Iglesias Aldanza (Basque Nationalist Party)

Area
  - Total: 36.74 km^{2} (14.19 sq mi)
- Elevation: 345 m (1,132 ft)

Population (2025-01-01)
  - Total: 754
  - Density: 20.5/km^{2} (53.2/sq mi)
- Time zone: UTC+1 (CET)
  - Summer (DST): UTC+2 (CEST)
- Postal code: 48289
- Official language(s): Basque; Spanish
- Website: Official website

Artzentales is a municipality in the province of Biscay, in the autonomous community of the Basque Country, northern Spain.
