= Livestock in the Basque Country (autonomous community) =

The business of livestock farming is prominent in the Basque Country (Spain). The climate of this region is ideal for raising cattle and other livestock and is classified as Atlantic, or warm and rainy. The most common breeds of livestock raised in this region include beef cattle, dairy cattle, sheep, goats, and horses. These animals are most often raised in mixed farms, or farms that contain a combination of these types of animals and not just one type exclusively. Although the number of livestock farms notably decreased between the years of 1999 and 2009, the number of animals raised on each remaining farm increased dramatically, as discussed in further detail below. In 2006, there were estimated to be about 19,000 Basque farms that involved the raising of livestock.

== Types of livestock ==
=== Cattle ===
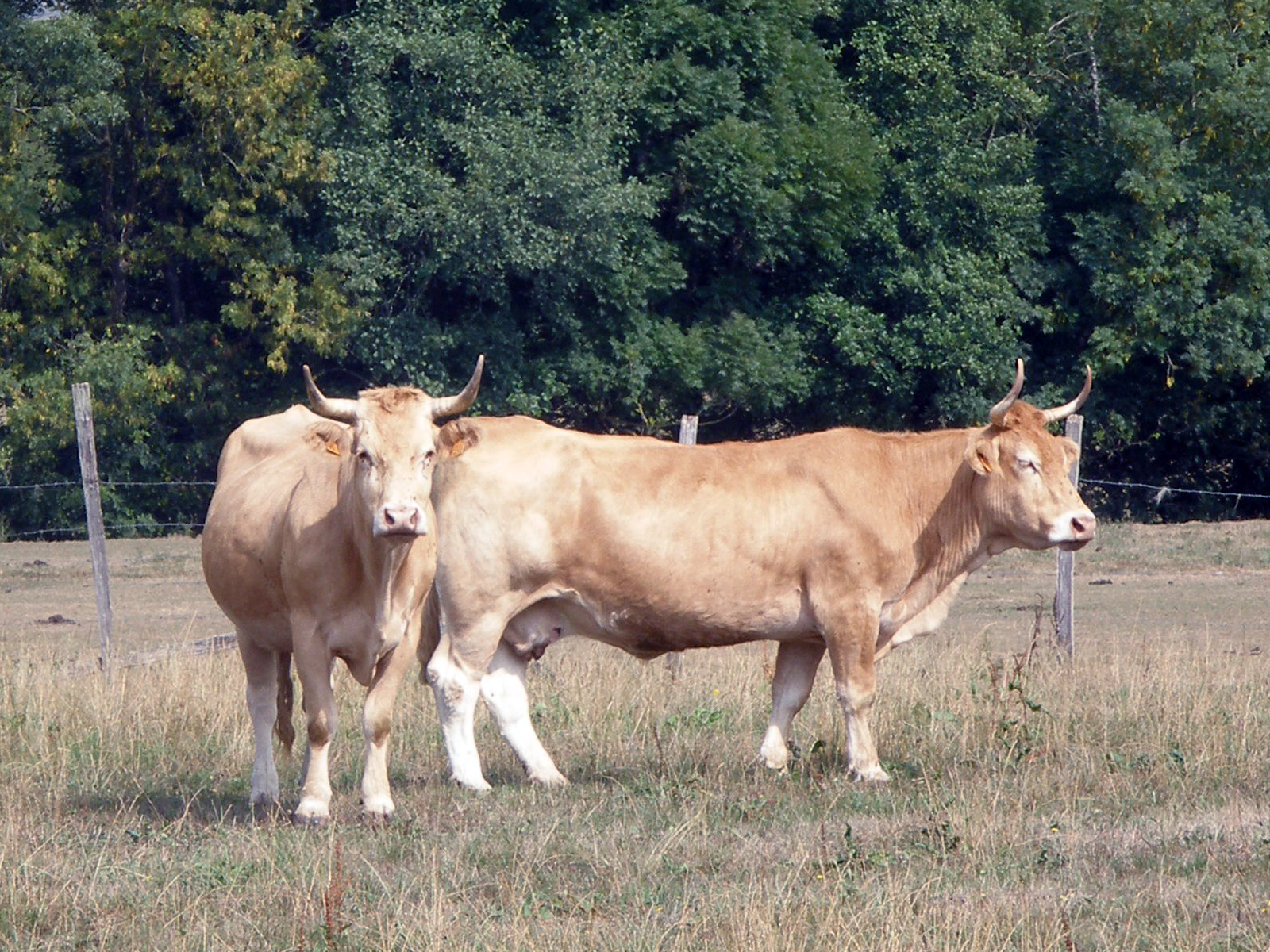
Pirenaica cows at pasture in the comarca of Baztán in Navarre

Beef cattle are the most popular livestock farmed in the Basque Country, being present in approximately 62% of all livestock farms of that region. Between 1999 and 2009, the average number of cattle present on each farm rose by about 88.3%, making cattle the most rapidly increasing group of livestock during that time. One explanation for this increased attraction to beef cattle farming is that the production of beef meat easily involves other industries such as dairy and cereal, allowing for more economic opportunities and collaborations. Almost a quarter of livestock gross production is beef meat. Some common breeds of cattle in the Basque Country include Betizu, Monchina, Pirenaica, and Terreña. However, the breed that is used most often in the meat industry is Pirenaica. Of all of the breeds used in meat production in this region, this is the only breed that is completely native to the Basque Country.

Dairy cattle are present in 17% of Basque farms. These animals are the only type of livestock in the Basque Country that must be raised in separate, specialized farms, as opposed to the mixed farms mentioned above.

As of 2006, there are 15 provincial Farmers' Associations in the Basque Country, each specializing in a specific breed of cattle. These associations are held accountable for collecting and processing data about the cattle. The Association of Pirenaica is outstanding amongst these groups due to its high number of cattle, experience, and genetic advancement of the livestock.

=== Sheep ===
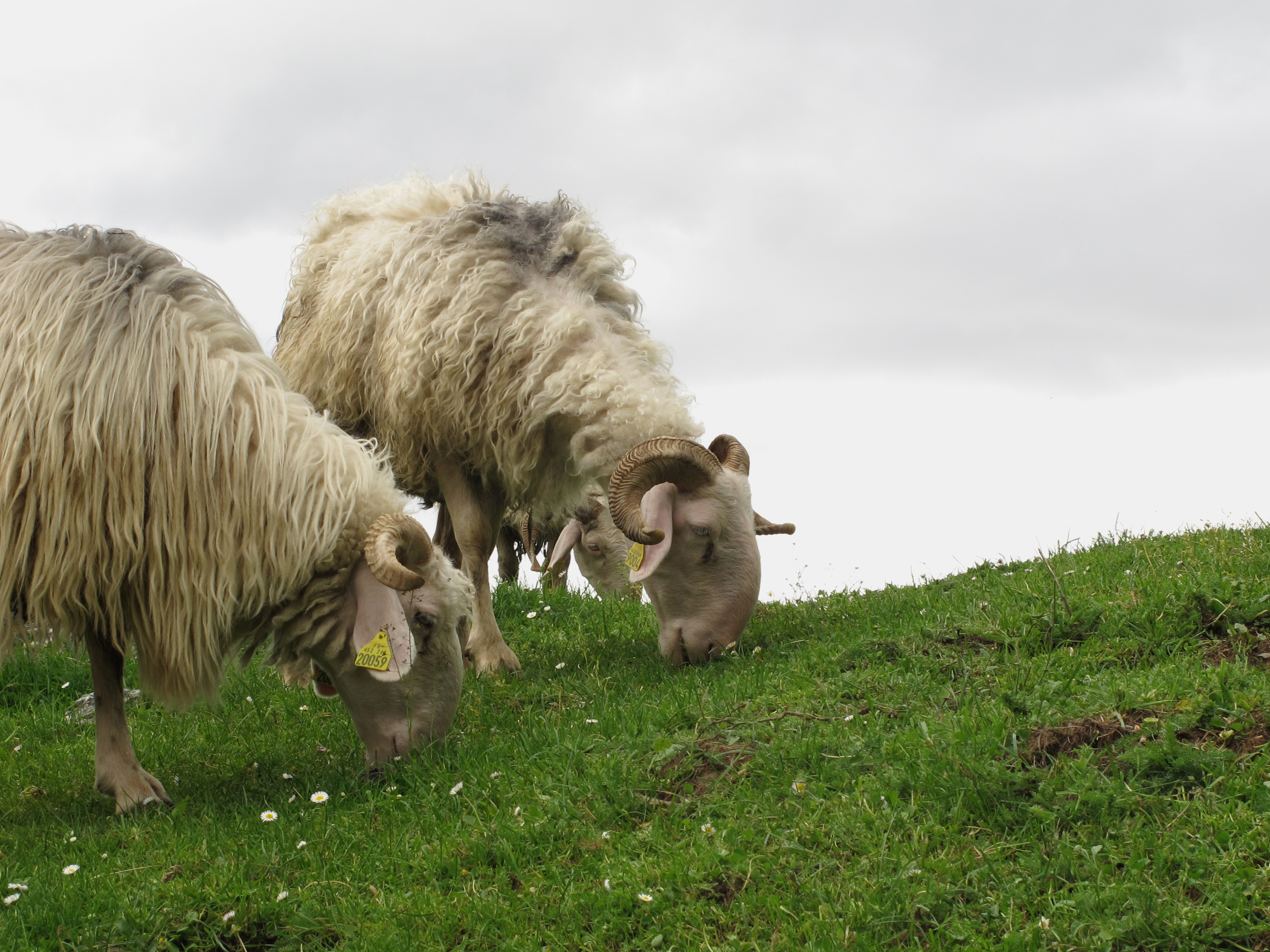
Carranzana sheep. Rams are horned and the ewes may be either horned or polled (hornless).

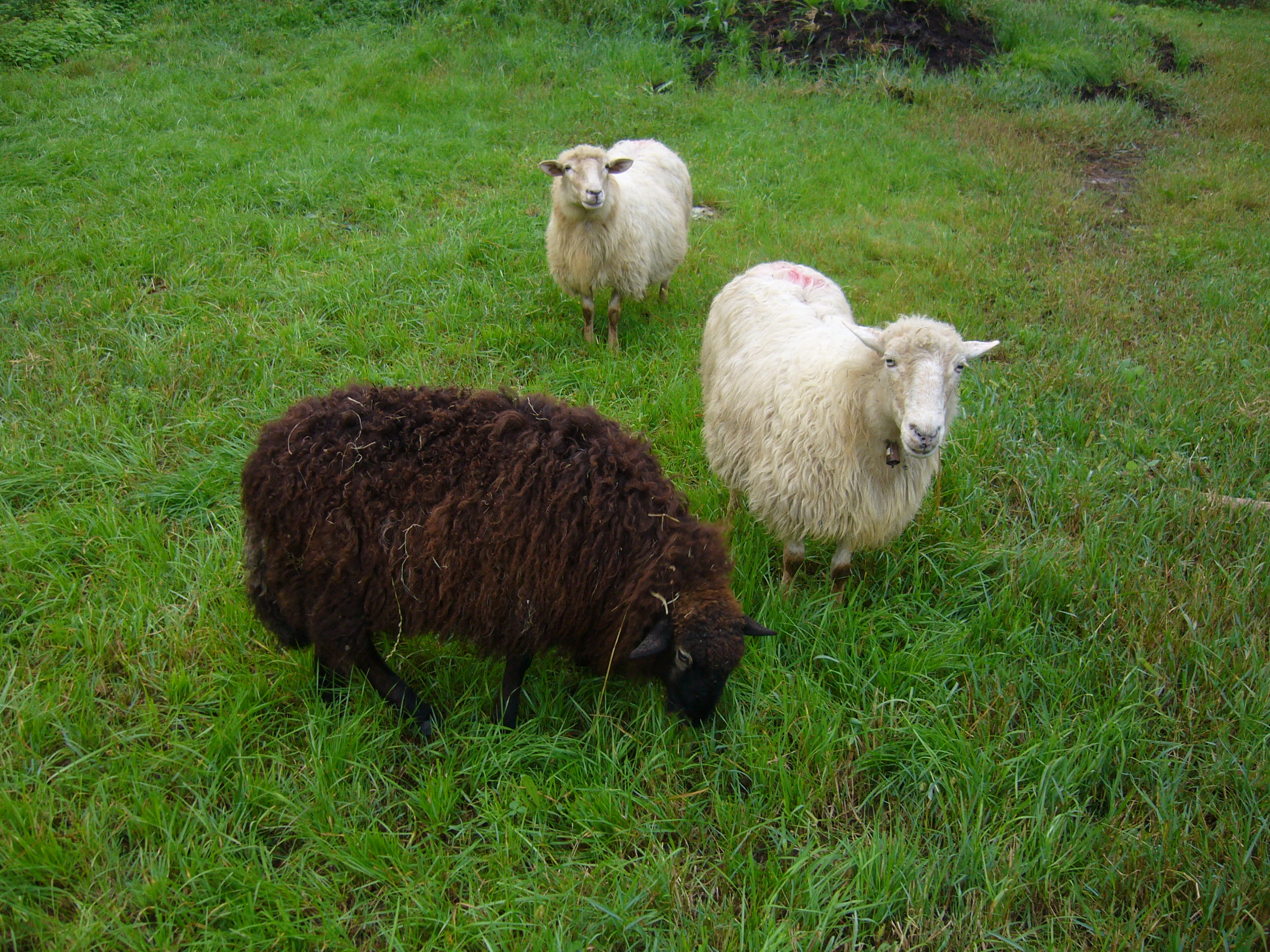
Latxa sheep can be both blonde and dark-faced

Common sheep breeds in this region include Carranzana, Latxa, and Sasi ardi. The Carranzana and Laxta sheep are most renowned for their role in the dairy industry. The vast majority of the milk obtained from these sheep is made into cheese; the farms themselves turn approximately 47% of it into cheese, while a slightly smaller percentage is made into cheese by dairy factories who buy the milk from the farms. The rest of the milk is kept in its original form for sale. Carranzana and Laxta sheep play an insignificant role in the wool industry. Dairy sheep make up a crucial part of Basque economy in certain regions where there is a lack of other prominent industries.

=== Goats ===
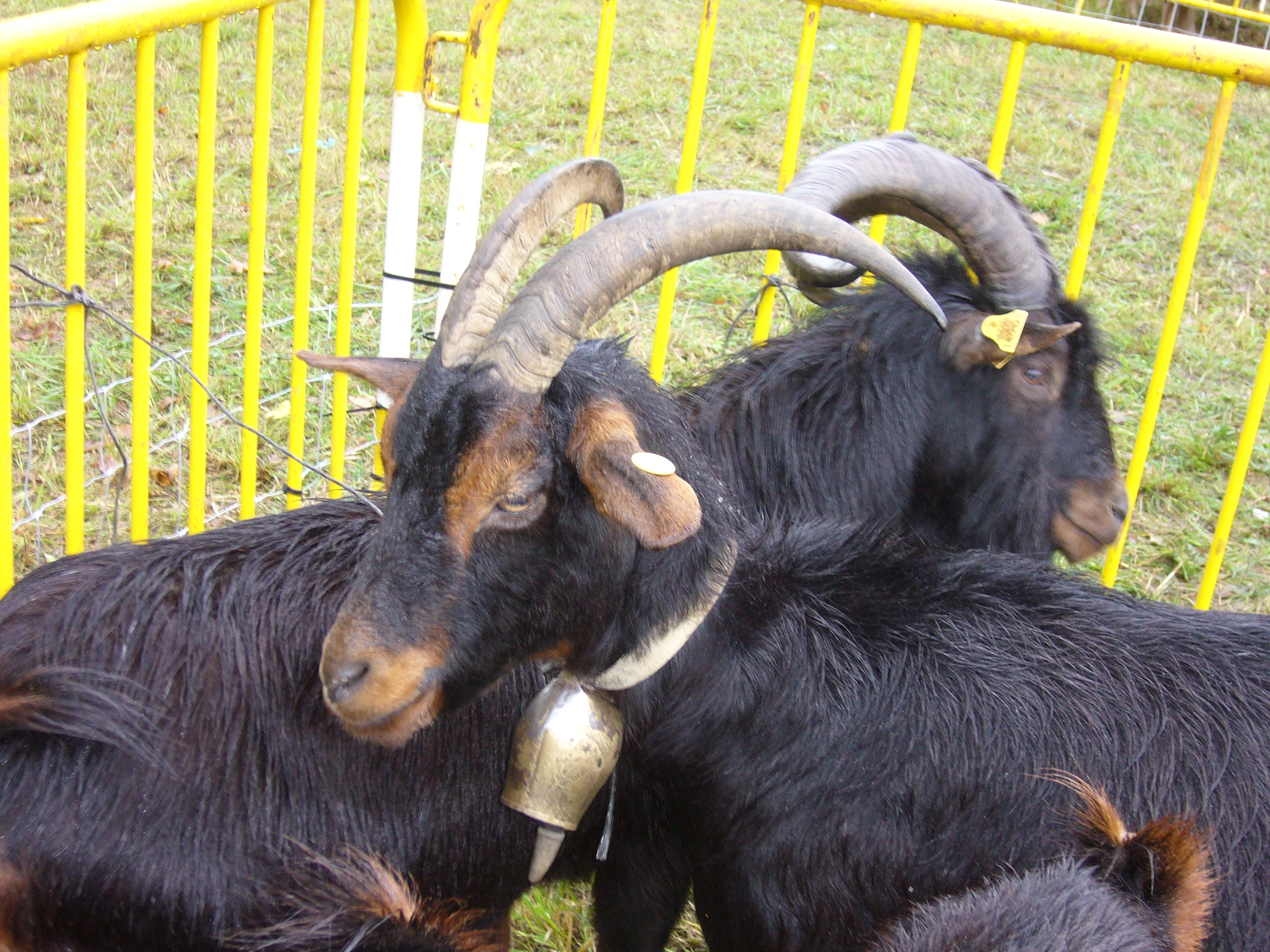
Azpi Gorri goats

The Azpi Gorri goats are predominant in the Basque Country and are native to the Pyrenees. They are raised primarily for the meat and dairy industries. They graze year-round in rocky mountain territories. The business of goat meat production is notably successful in villages where it is customary to serve young goats as the center of a feast during celebrations of special occasions. In the 1980s through the 1990s, Basque administration created a plan to eliminate all types of goats in that region for reasons of sanitation and nature preservation; this caused the number of Azpi gorri to decline during that time. Since then, the economic potential of their products has been realized and conservation efforts were put into effect. Despite these efforts, their numbers are still critically low to the point of near extinction.

=== Horses and other equines ===
Notable equine wildlife include donkeys, horses, and ponies. The asno de las Encartaciones, or the donkey of the Enkarterri territory of the province of Vizcaya, has been widely used in farm labor and is almost extinct. The Caballo de monte del País Vasco, or the mountain horse of the Basque Country, is used for its meat as well as for transportation. Thirdly, the Pottoka, a native Basque breed of pony, is known for being the subject of cave paintings found in the area from over 30,000 years ago.

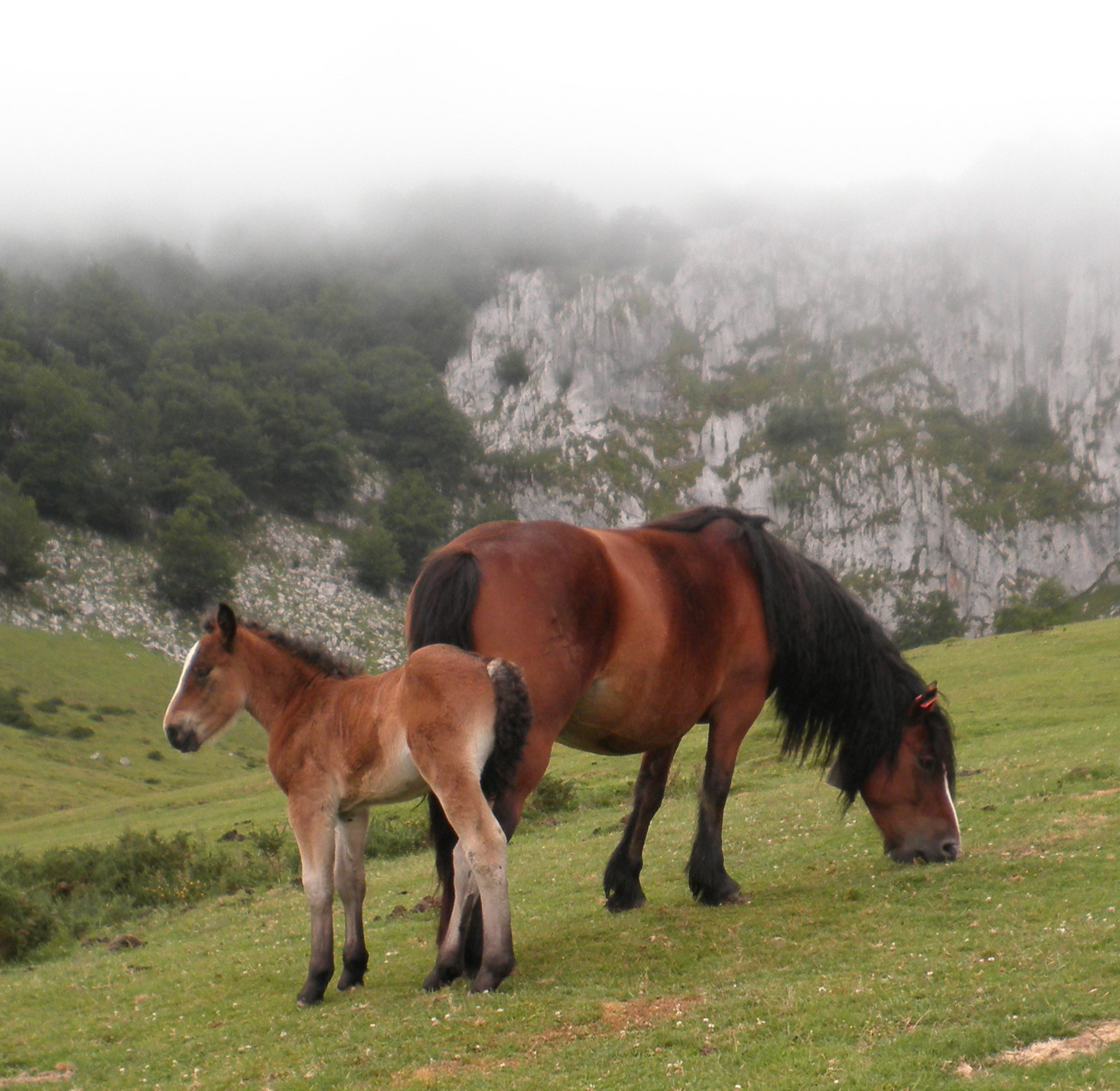
Basque mountain horse mare and foal

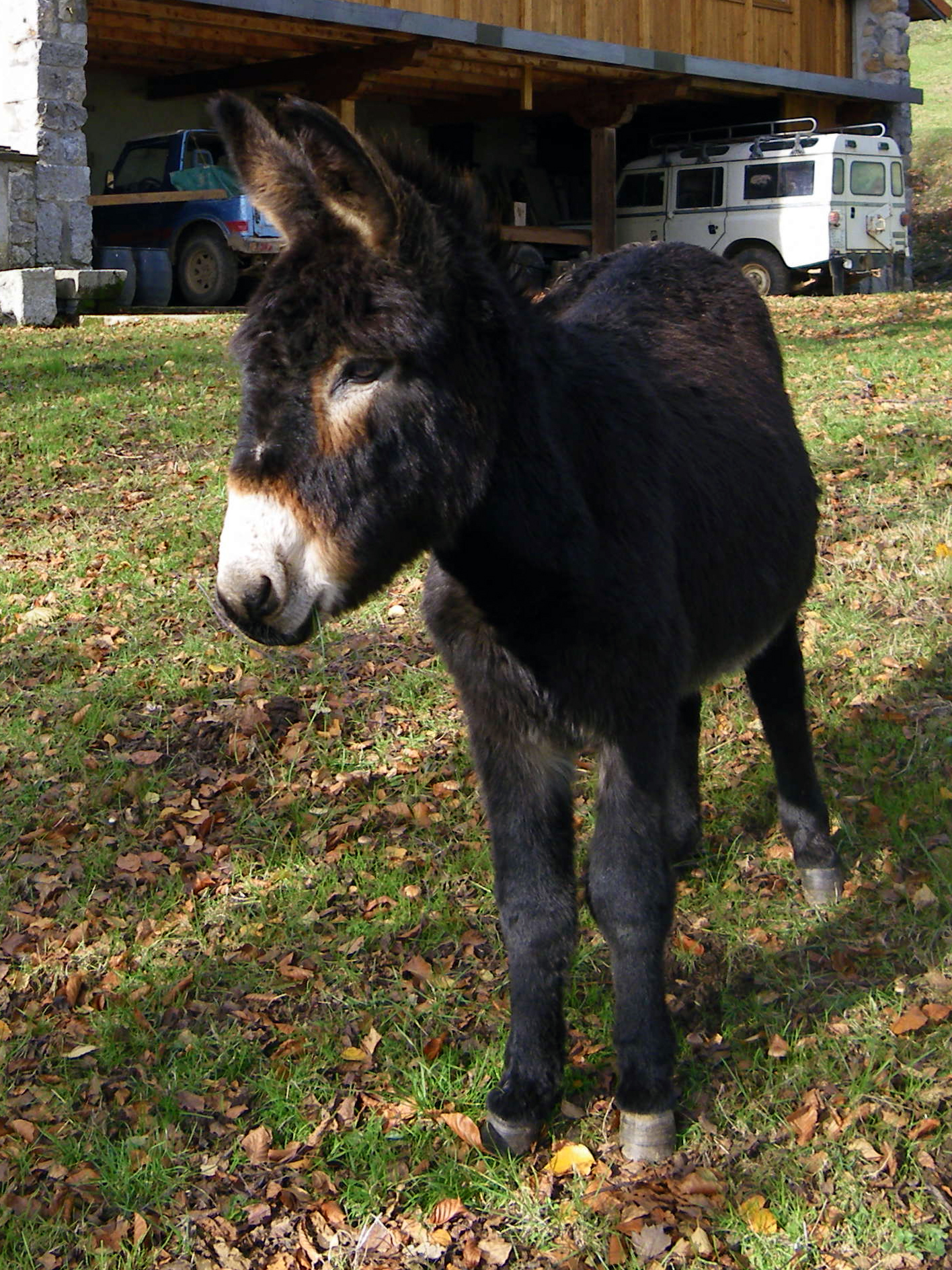
An "Asno de las Encartaciones"

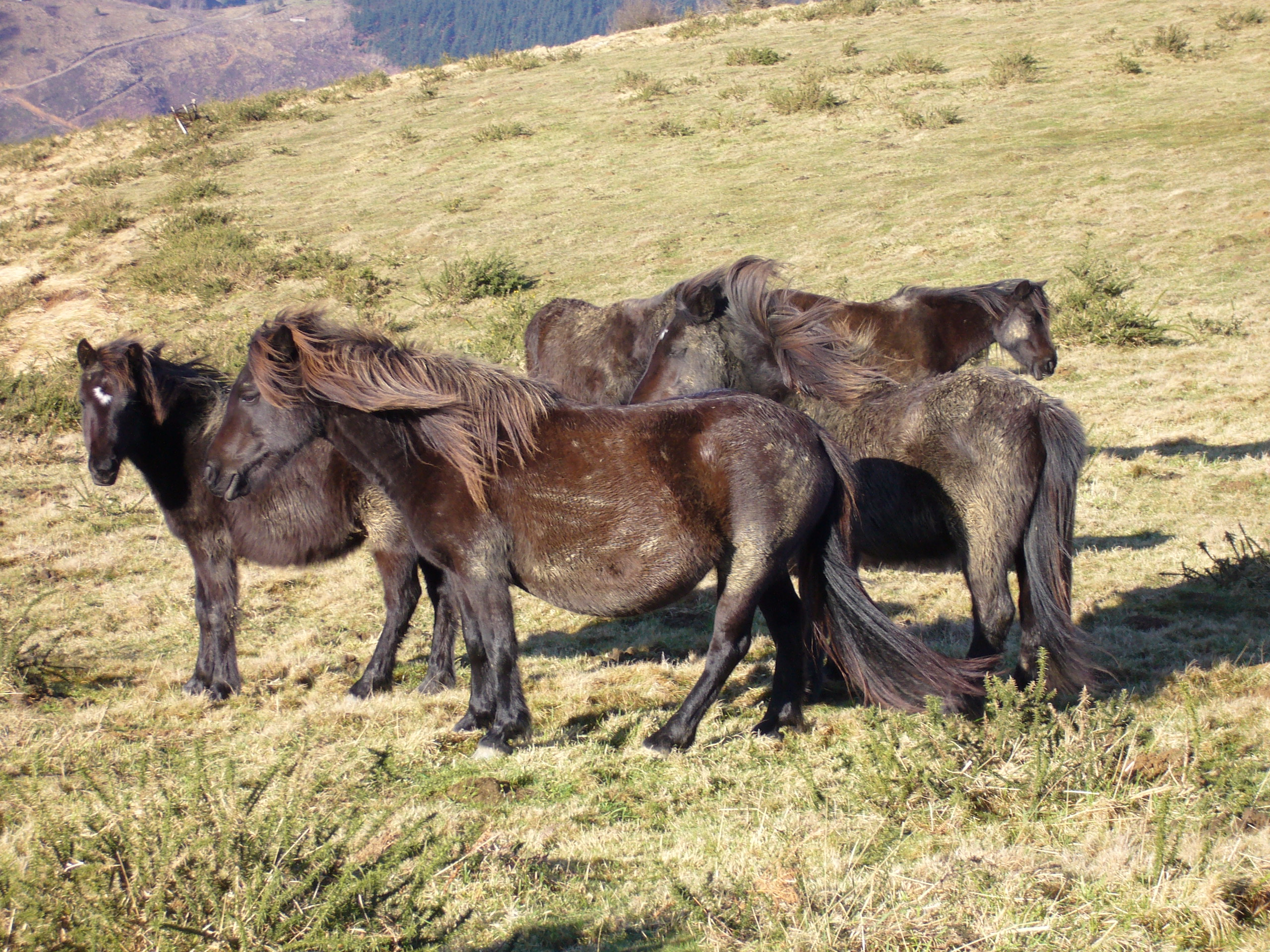
Pottoks with winter coat

== Preservation of breeds ==
The preservation of domestic livestock breeds has become valued for a variety of reasons. One reason is that the existence of several distinct breeds could lead to economic opportunities in the future. Also, breed variations offer diversity in the physical and behavioral traits of the animals, inherently providing a basis for scientific study and representing part of the unique Basque wildlife. Furthermore, these physical and temperamental distinctions can be utilized in unique ways on the farm and in society; for example, Terreña cattle are built well for agrarian labor, whereas Monchina cattle, especially the females, are traditionally involved in bullfights.

== People in charge of livestock farming ==
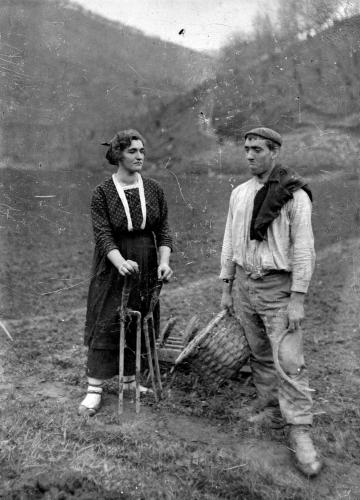
Farmers in Eitzaga 1922

There have been minor changes in the demographics of the people in charge of livestock operations during the 1990s and into the 2000s. The number of middle-aged bosses (aged 40–65 years old) increased by about 5%, while the number of young workers (aged less than 40 years old) decreased slightly by 3%. In addition, the number of women in charge increased by about 6%, meaning that by 2009 they made up about one third of all the heads of operation in the Basque Country.

== Environmental impact and use of natural resources ==
Cattle are predominant producers of greenhouse gases such as methane and nitrous oxide. In fact, more than one third of all of Spain's methane emissions come from livestock. These gases are released principally through the anaerobic decomposition of both manure and the feed that is given to the animals. Due to its affiliation with the United Nations Framework Convention on Climate Change (UNFCCC), Spain is required to report these emission data every year to this organization so that the major sources of emissions can be determined and solutions for lowering the emissions can be agreed upon. Farmers are generally able to make good use of the natural food sources for livestock, supplementing this with farm resources when necessary. However, the system is not perfect and some inequalities still do exist between grazing areas; while certain places are overgrazed, others are hardly even touched. More studies need to be done to determine the most effective practices for using these lands in the livestock industry. During warmer times of the season, while dairy sheep and beef cattle are grazing together in mountain pastures, grass is harvested from prairies and is stored for later use during the winter, meaning that farmers can utilize natural local resources more efficiently throughout the entire year. Fences are not widely used to guide or contain livestock, so the natural countryside remains fairly untouched in that regard. This lack of physical barriers is generally unproblematic, although the potential utility of fences has been pointed out in cases in which non-agricultural social activities have crossed the boundaries of grazing land. Overall, the presence of grazing livestock in Basque prairies and mountains helps to keep the ecosystem in balance.
