= Basque breeds and cultivars =

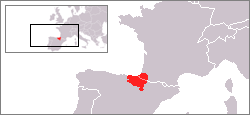
The location of the Basque provinces within Europe

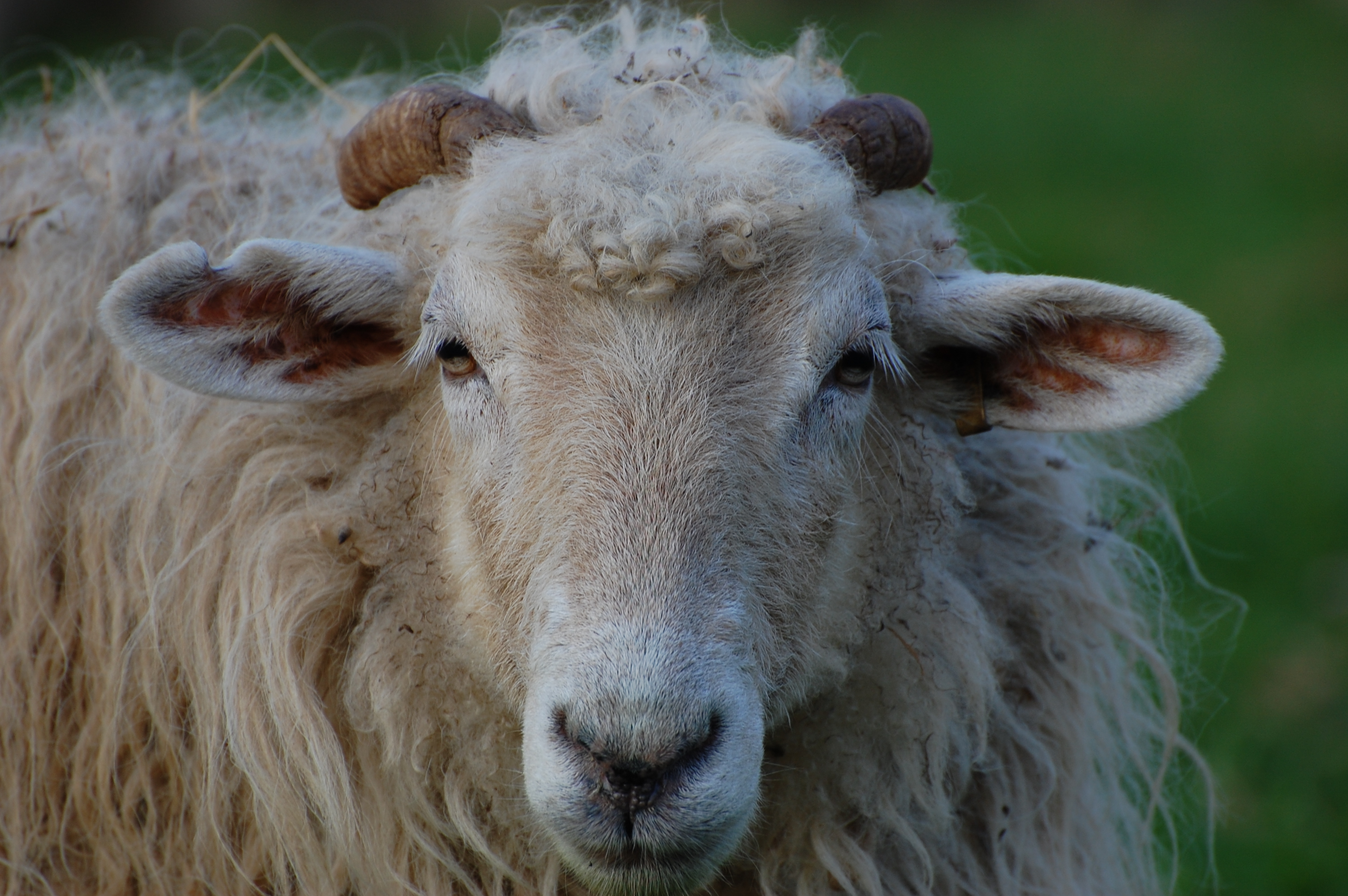
A Latxa ewe

Basque breeds and cultivars are domesticated animals and plant species that have been bred or cultivated for particular traits and features by the Basque people in the Basque Country.

Some, such as the Alano Español, are not originally Basque but have only survived in the Basque Country.

== Basque livestock breeds ==
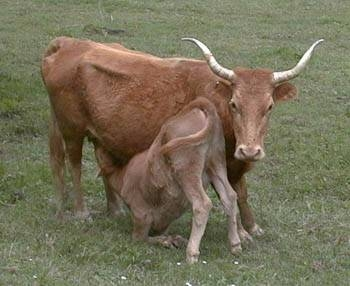
A Betizu cow with calf

=== Azpi Gorri ===
The Azpi Gorri is a breed of goat found in the Gorbeia region between Álava and Biscay, the Encartaciones, Anboto and Aramotz in Biscay. With less than 100 animals, it is considered an endangered rare breed. The Azpi Gorri is the only recognised goat breed from the region

=== Basco-béarnaise ===
The Basco-béarnaise is a sheep breed from the Northern Basque Country and Béarn. Its characteristics are long, white wool, curved horns, weighing up to 80 kg (180 lb). It is mainly a dairy sheep and the milk (7.42% fat content, 5.39% proteins) is used to make the AOC Ossau-Iraty cheese. The equivalent breed in the Spanish Basque Country is the Vasca Carranzana.

=== Baztanesa ===
The Baztanesa or Baztango Txerria is an extinct breed of Basque pig of Celtic type. It originated in – and is named for – the Baztan Valley in northern Navarre, and until the 1960s was the most common pig in that area.

=== Betizu ===
The Betizu is a cattle breed characterised as being agile, with a large head and a rectangular profile.

=== Chato Vitoriano ===
The Chato Vitoriano, also called the Chato de Vitoria, Chato Alavés or Chato de Llanada among other names, is an extinct Basque pig breed. It originated in Álava, but spread throughout the Basque Country and to other parts of Spain including Valencia, La Rioja and Castilla y Leon. In 1955 the breeding stock numbered some 86000 animals; the breed became extinct in the 1960s.

=== Enkarterriko Asto ===
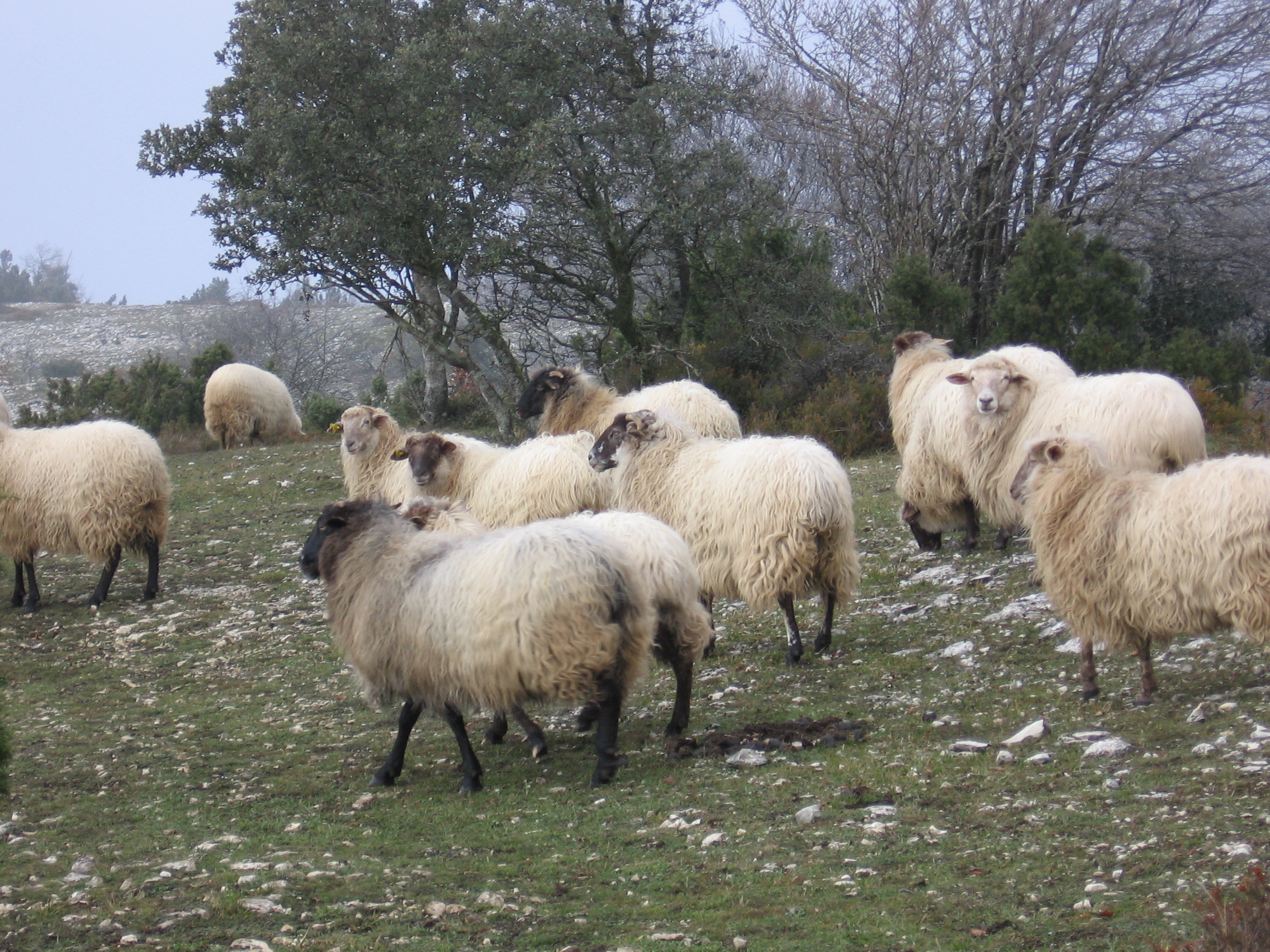
Latxas in Álava

The Enkarterriko Asto or Spanish: Asno de las Encartaciones is the smallest Iberian donkey breed, with males weighing between 170–210 kg (370–460 lb) and females 140–190 kg (310–420 lb), and the height at the withers is not much more than 120 cm (47 in).

=== Euskal Antzara ===
The Euskal Antzara is the Basque breed of domestic goose. It is raised for both meat and eggs. Ganders weigh 7–9 kg (15–20 lb), geese about 1 kg (2.2 lb) less. The eggs are white and weigh at least 160 g (5.6 oz).

=== Euskal Oiloa ===
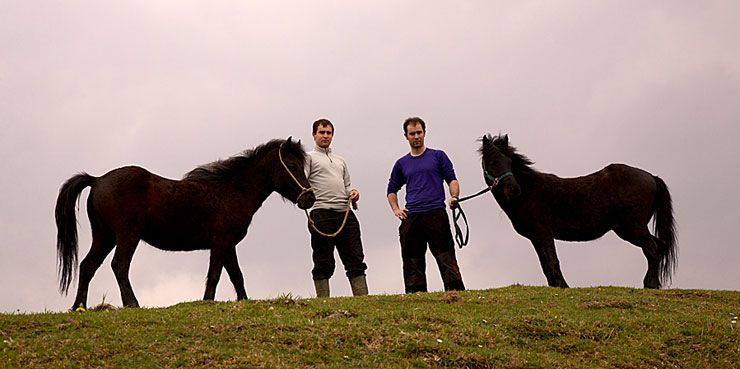
Pottoks bred by the ZAPE Society

The Euskal Oiloa is the chicken breed of the Basque Country. It has five varieties: Beltza (black), Gorria, Lepasoila (naked-necked), Marraduna and Zilarra. At the end of 2013 a population of 10872 birds was reported, all from the País Vasco.

=== Euskal Txerria ===
The Euskal Txerria, also called Pie Noir du Pays Basque or Xuri eta beltza, is an indigenous breed of the Basque Country, standardized in France in 1921, and today endangered.

=== Latxa ===
The Latxa ([ˈlatʃa]), also encountered as lacha in the Spanish spelling is a Basque dairy sheep. They are mostly bred in Biscay, Gipuzkoa and Navarre for their milk which is used in the production of Idiazábal and Roncal cheeses.

A medium to small sheep with a fairly coarse wool.

=== Pottoka ===
The Pottoka (Basque pronunciation: [poˈcoka]) is an ancient but endangered breed of mountain horse. They are small horses with a large head, small ears, short neck, long back, shaggy mane and small hooves. Originally these roamed the Basque Pyrenees in a semi-feral state but today many are stabled.

== Basque dogs ==
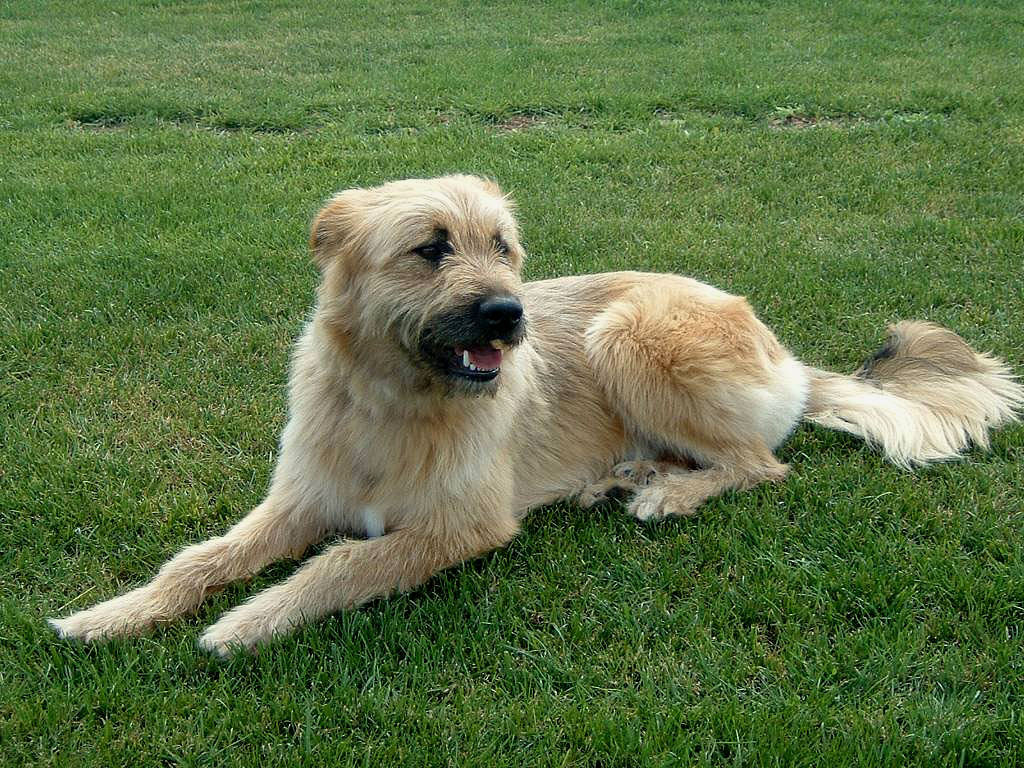
A Basque Shepherd Dog

There are five Basque dog breeds:

- the Basque Shepherd Dog (pastor vasco in Spanish, Basque: Euskal Artzain Txakurra) is common throughout the Basque Country.
- the Erbi Txakur
- the Pachón de Vitoria or Pachón Navarro
- the Villano de Las Encartaciones or Enkarterriko Billano
- the Villanuco de Las Encartaciones or Enkarterriko Billanuko

Of these, all but the Pachón de Vitoria are indigenous to the Basque Autonomous Community, and were recognised as traditional Basque breeds by government decree in 2001.

== Basque cultivars ==
=== Alubia pinta alavesa ===
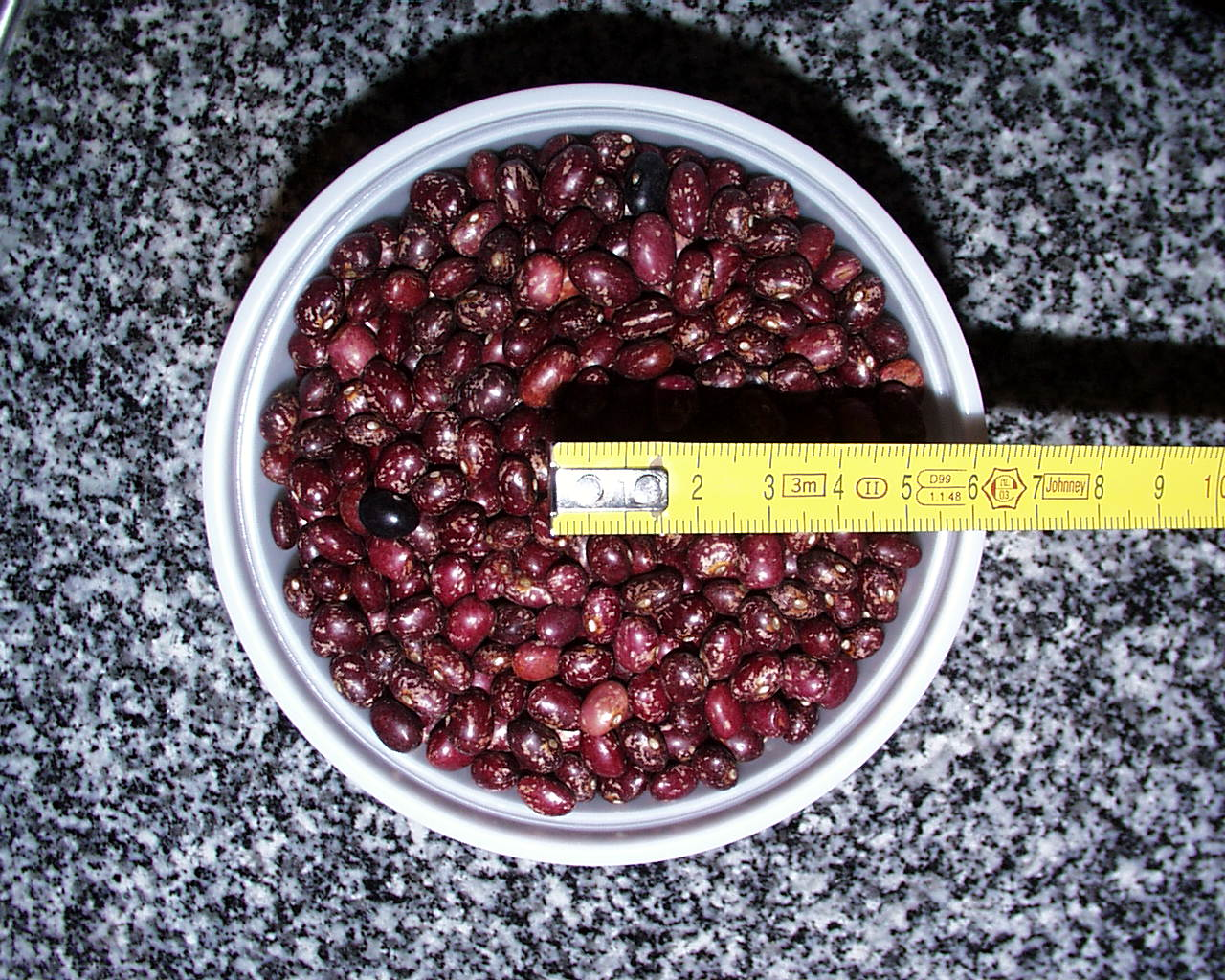
Alavan pinto beans

The Alavan pinto bean is a type of common bean.

=== Basque apple cultivars ===
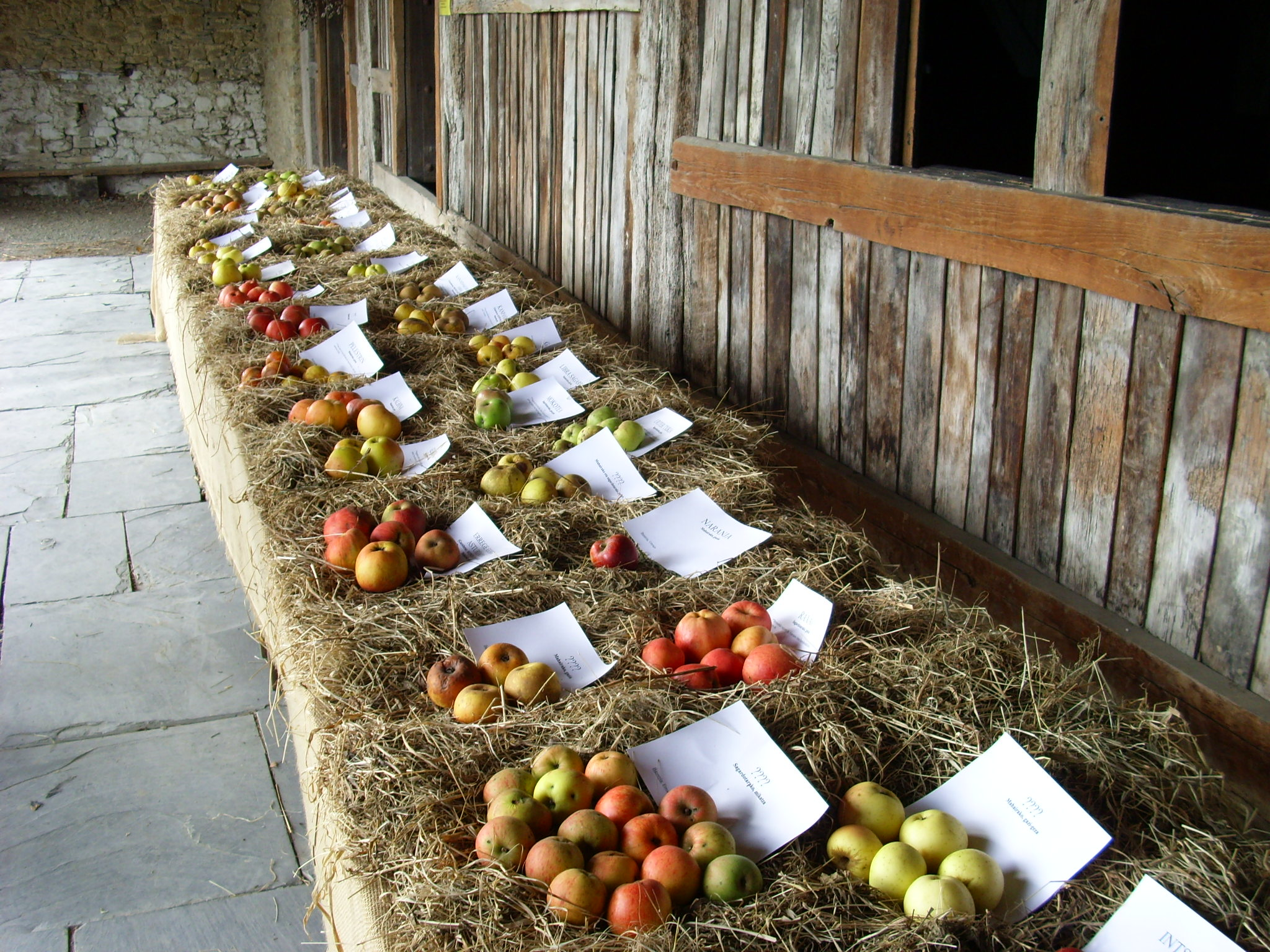
An exhibition of apple cultivars at the Igartubeiti baserri in Ezkio-Itsaso

Apple growing has a long history in the Basque Country, in particular for use in making Basque cider. The earliest written records on cider making and drinking go back to the 11th and 12th century, the very first being a record of Sancho III of Navarre sending an envoy to the Monastery of Leire in 1014 who mentions apples and cider-making. The other is the circa 1134 diary of the pilgrim Aymeric Picaud included in the Codex Calixtinus who mentions the Basques being notable for growing apples and drinking cider. The sixteenth-century inquisitor Pierre de Lancre also refers to the Basque Country as "the land of the apple".

Many varieties exist and are used for making cider. Azkue's dictionary alone, which was printed in 1905, lists more than 80 Basque varieties of apples. Depending on the desired character of the finished cider, different varieties and proportions of apple varieties are used. Some common varieties include:

- Errezila, sharp and sweet (mottled green), the most common Basque apple variety
- Geza miña, sharp; also called sagar zuria and esnaola sagarra (green)
- Goikoetxea, sharp (red)
- Mokoa, sharp (red)
- Mozoloa sweet and fresh (green)
- Patzuloa, sweet and fresh (light green)
- Txalaka sour and sweet (bright green)
- Ugarte, sour (red)
- Urdin sagarra, sharp (apple red on top and green underneath)
- Urtebi txikia, sharp (yellow-green)

=== Espelette peppers ===
A variety of mild peppers with AOC certification, grown in the Northern Basque Country in the Espelette area.

=== Pelua cherries ===
Pelua cherries are an early Basque black cherry cultivar.

=== Xapata cherries ===
Xapata (pronounced [ʃaˈpata]) cherries are a variety of black cherry with a very short fruiting season, lasting only a few weeks around June. They are cultivates mainly in the area around the Lapurdian town of Itxassou.

== Pyrenean breeds ==
Several breeds of animals are common both in the Basque Country and other regions straddling the Pyrenees.

=== Pirenaica ===
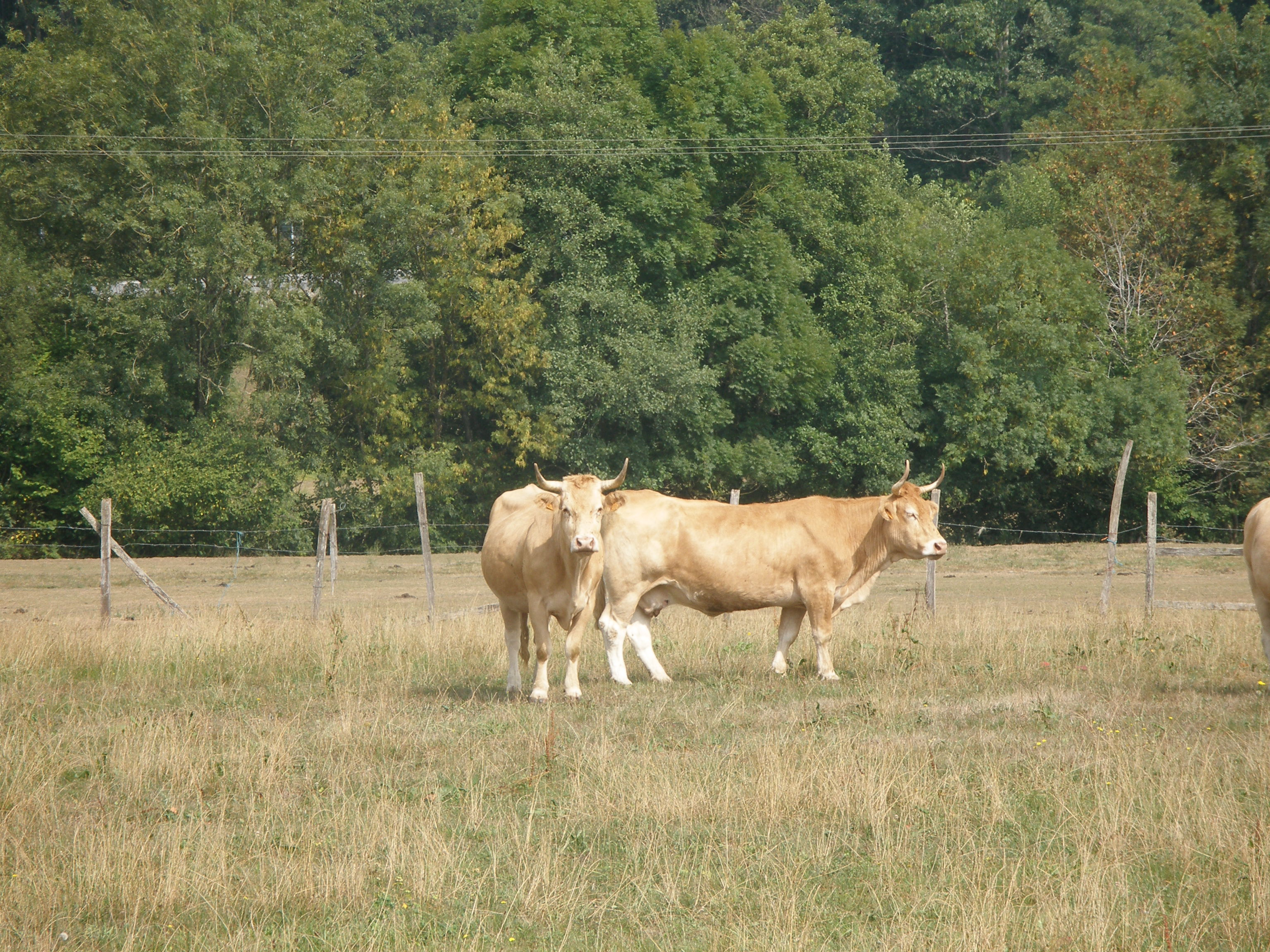
A group of Pirenaica in the Baztan Valley

The Pirenaica is a breed of cattle found in the Basque Country, Aragon and Catalonia. There were more than 4000 head in the Basque Autonomous Community in 1995, and the breed is not considered endangered.

=== Pyrenean Mountain Dog ===
The Pyrenean Mountain Dog (Pirinioetako mendiko zakurra in Basque) is a large breed of livestock guardian dog.

== See also ==
- Basque people
- Cultivars
- List of domesticated animals
- Livestock in the Basque Country
