= Basque Shepherd Dog =

Spanish breed of dog

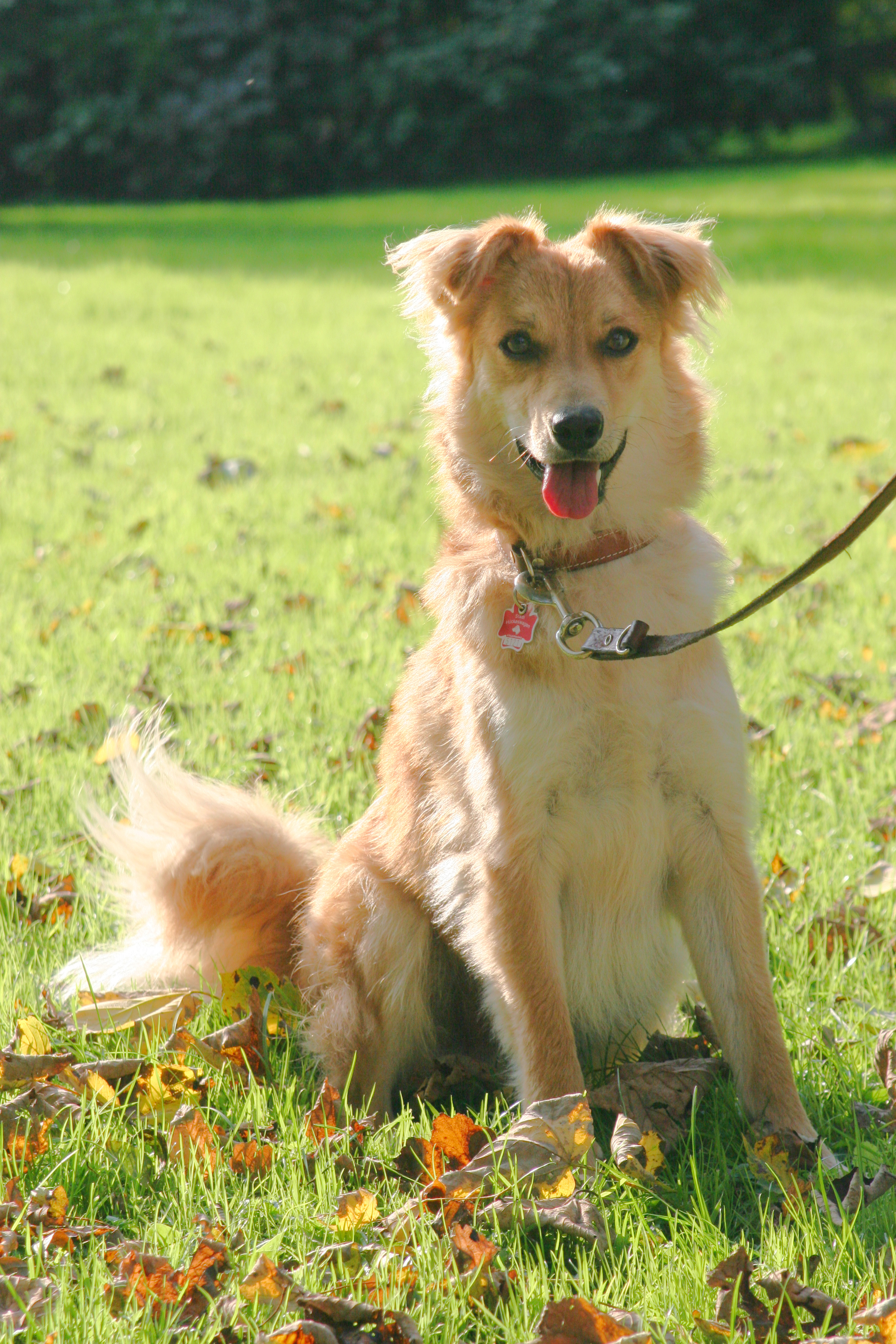
- A young dog, Gorbeiakoa type
- Other names: Basque: Euskal Artzain Txakurra; Spanish: Perro de Pastor Vasco; French: Berger Basque; Basque Sheepdog; Basque Herder
- Origin: Basque Country (Spain, France)
Traits
| Height | Males | Gorbeiakoa: 47–61 cm (19–24 in); Iletsua: 47–63 cm (19–25 in) |
| | Females | Gorbeiakoa: 46–59 cm (18–23 in); Iletsua: 46–58 cm (18–23 in) |
| Weight | Males | Gorbeiakoa: 18–36 kg (40–80 lb); Iletsua: 18–33 kg (40–75 lb) |
| | Females | Gorbeiakoa: 17–29 kg (35–65 lb); Iletsua: 17–30 kg (35–65 lb) |
- Coat: moderately long; Gorbeiakoa: smooth, soft; Iletsua: rough, coarse
- Colour: Gorbeiakoa: red, fawn; Iletsua: cinnamon, fawn
Kennel club standards
- Real Sociedad Canina de España: Iletsua standard
- RSCFRCE: Gorbeiakoa standard

The Basque Shepherd Dog (Basque: Euskal Artzain Txakurra) is a traditional Basque breed of sheepdog originating in the historic Basque Country.

It is one of five Basque breeds of dog – the others being the Erbi Txakur, the Pachón Navarro, the Villano de Las Encartaciones and the Villanuco de Las Encartaciones – and one of fourteen animal breeds native to the Basque Country.

== History ==
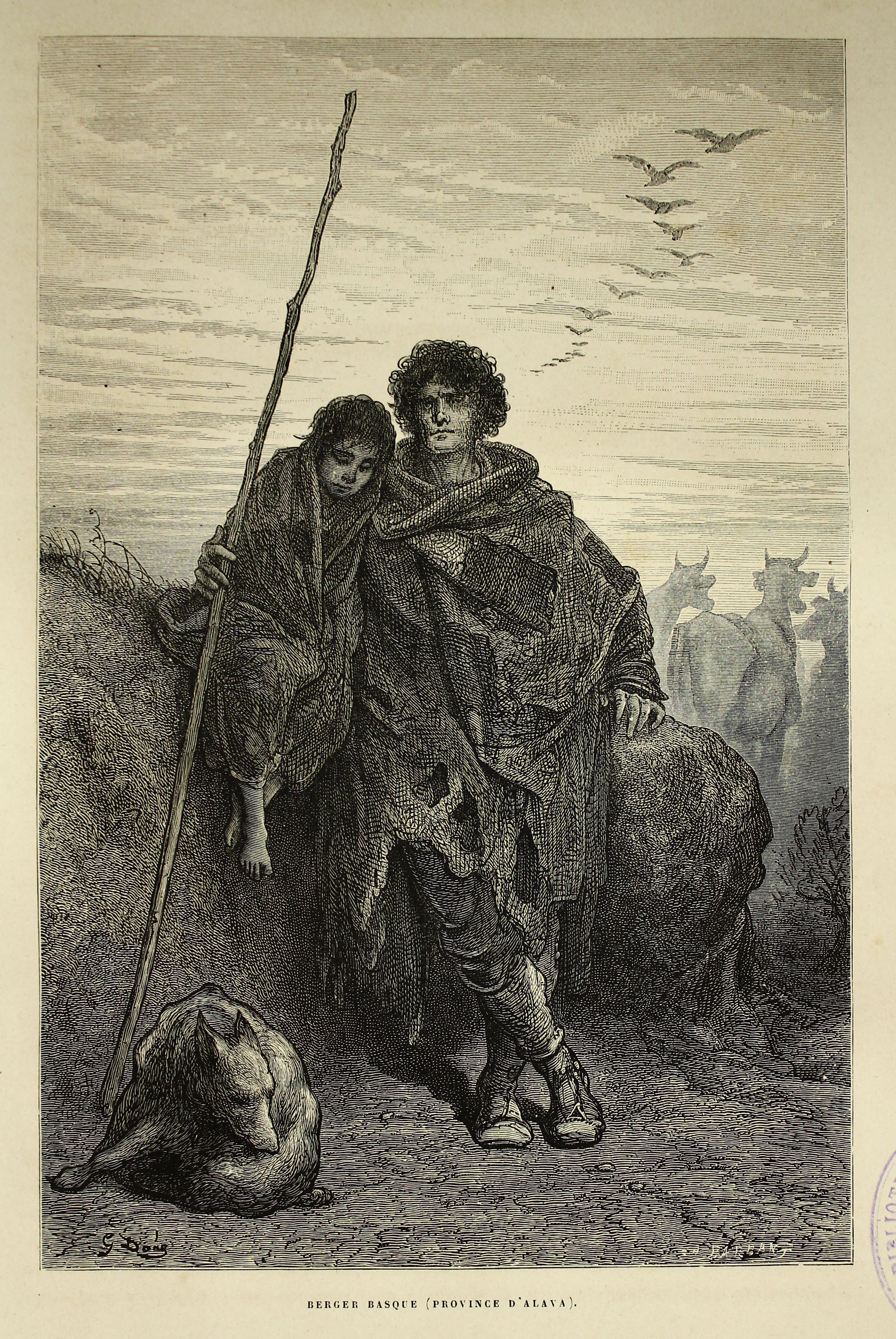
Berger Basque (Province d'Alava, engraving by Gustave Doré, 1874

The Euskal Artzain Txakurra is a traditional breed of the Basque people, and dogs of this type appear in Basque mythology. Similar dogs appear in frescoes in churches and monasteries of the Basque country from the sixteenth century onwards, and later also in the drawings and paintings of artists such as Luis Paret y Alcázar, Gustave Doré and Adolfo Guiard.

The breed was recognised by the Real Sociedad Canina de España in January 1996 in two varieties, Iletsua and Gorbeiakoa; the Gorbeiakoa originates from the region of Gorbea, and Iletsua means "hairy" or "shaggy" in Basque. It was officially recognised – and the breed standard published – by the national government of Spain in 2001, initially only in the Gorbeiakoa type; the Iletsua variant was recognised in the following year. Also in 2001, the breed in both its variants was included in the official list of autochthonous Basque breeds published by the government of the Basque Autonomous Community; specific legislation regulating breeding and registration was published in 2003.

In 2009 the total number of both subtypes of the breed was estimated to be 500. Although the Gorbeiakoa is historically linked to the municipios of the Parque Natural del Gorbeia, both it and the Iletsua are distributed throughout the historical Basque region.

In the 1950s some Basque people took sheepdogs with them when they travelled to the United States to work as shepherds.

In 2026 it was among the sixteen Spanish breeds considered by the Real Sociedad Canina de España to be vulnerable.

== Characteristics ==
The two varieties have many features in common. The body is strong and rectangular in outline, usually some 10–20% longer than it is high. The eyes are oval and may be brown or amber, the ears are of medium size, triangular and either pendent or folded.

The Gorbeiakoa has a soft smooth coat of moderate length, shorter on the face and on the front of the legs, and somewhat longer on the back of them. It may be either fire-red or fawn; if it is red, some darkening of the muzzle is common. Dogs stand some 47 to 61 cm at the withers and usually weigh 18 to 36 kg; bitches are slightly smaller, with weights in the range 17 to 29 kg.

The coat of the Iletsua variety is a rougher and wirier than that of the Gorbeiakoa. It is moderately long, rather shorter on the front of the legs. It may be either cinnamon-coloured or fawn. Dogs stand 47–63 cm and weigh 18 to 33 kg, bitches 46–58 cm with weights up to 30 kg.

== Use ==
The Euskal Artzain Txakurra has for centuries been used by shepherds of the Basque Country to guard and herd flocks of sheep. It has also been used in the management of flocks of goats and of herds of cattle or horses, and to guard farmhouses.

It is the dog most commonly used in txakur probak, traditional Basque sheepdog trials. It has also been successful in sheepdog trials at international level, including those held since 1950 at Oñati, in south-western Gipuzkoa.

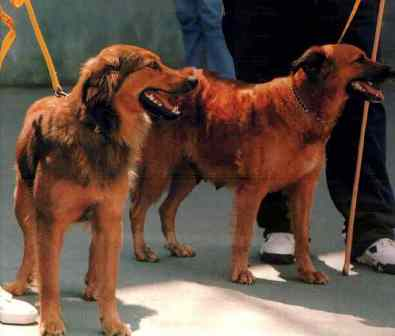
Gorbeiakoa, red

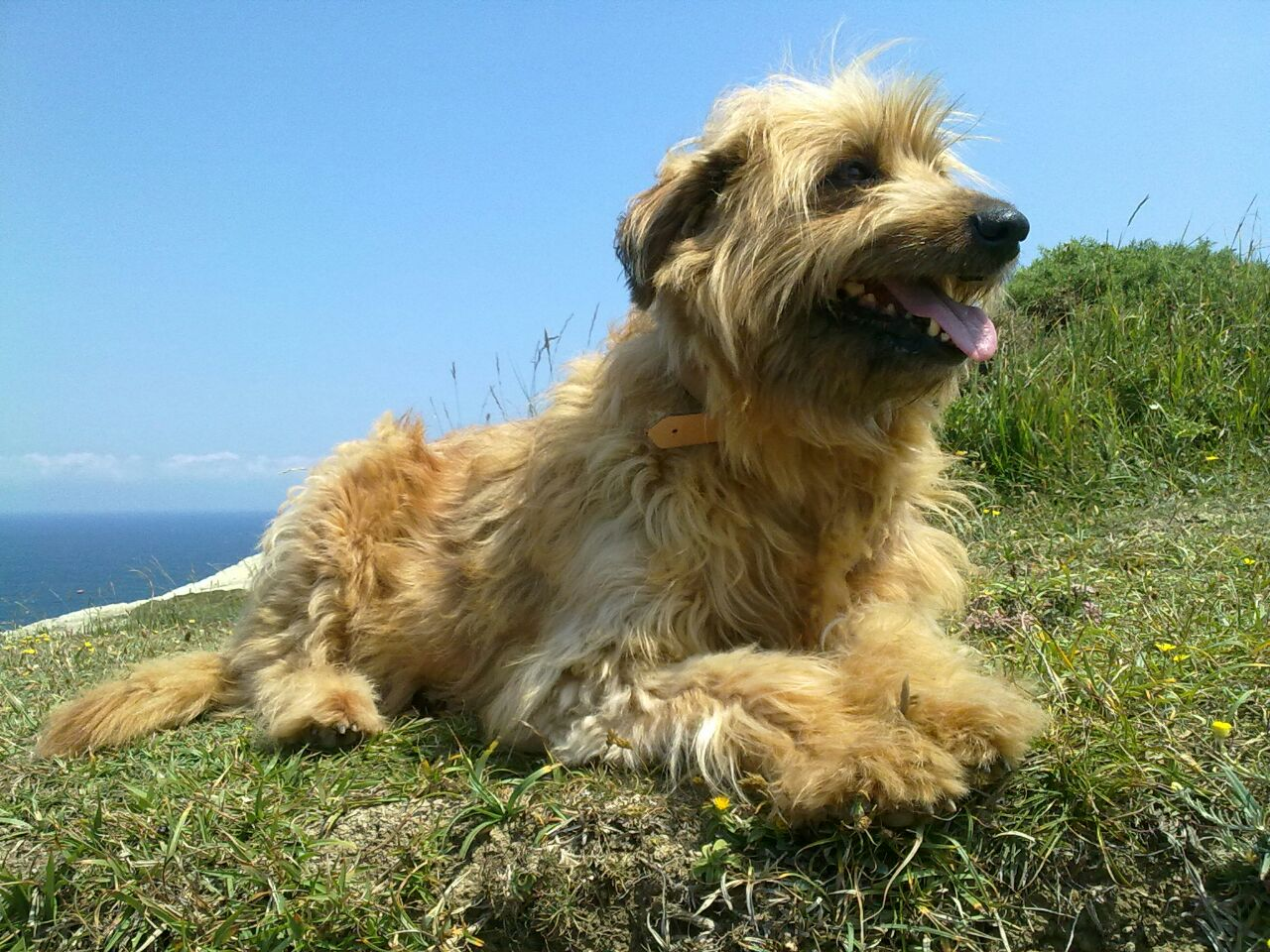
Iletsua, fawn

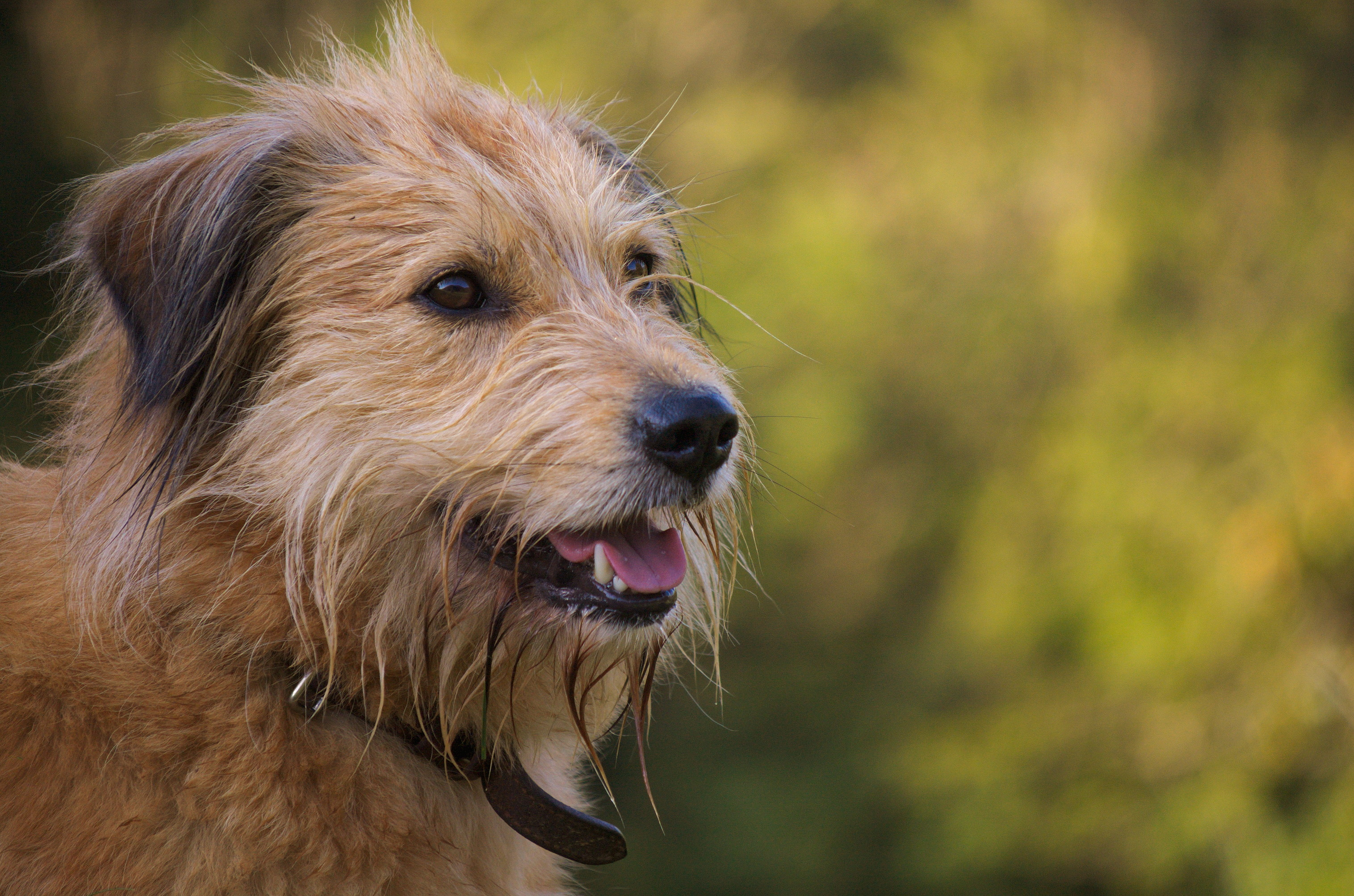
Iletsua
