= Azpi Gorri =

Spanish breed of goat

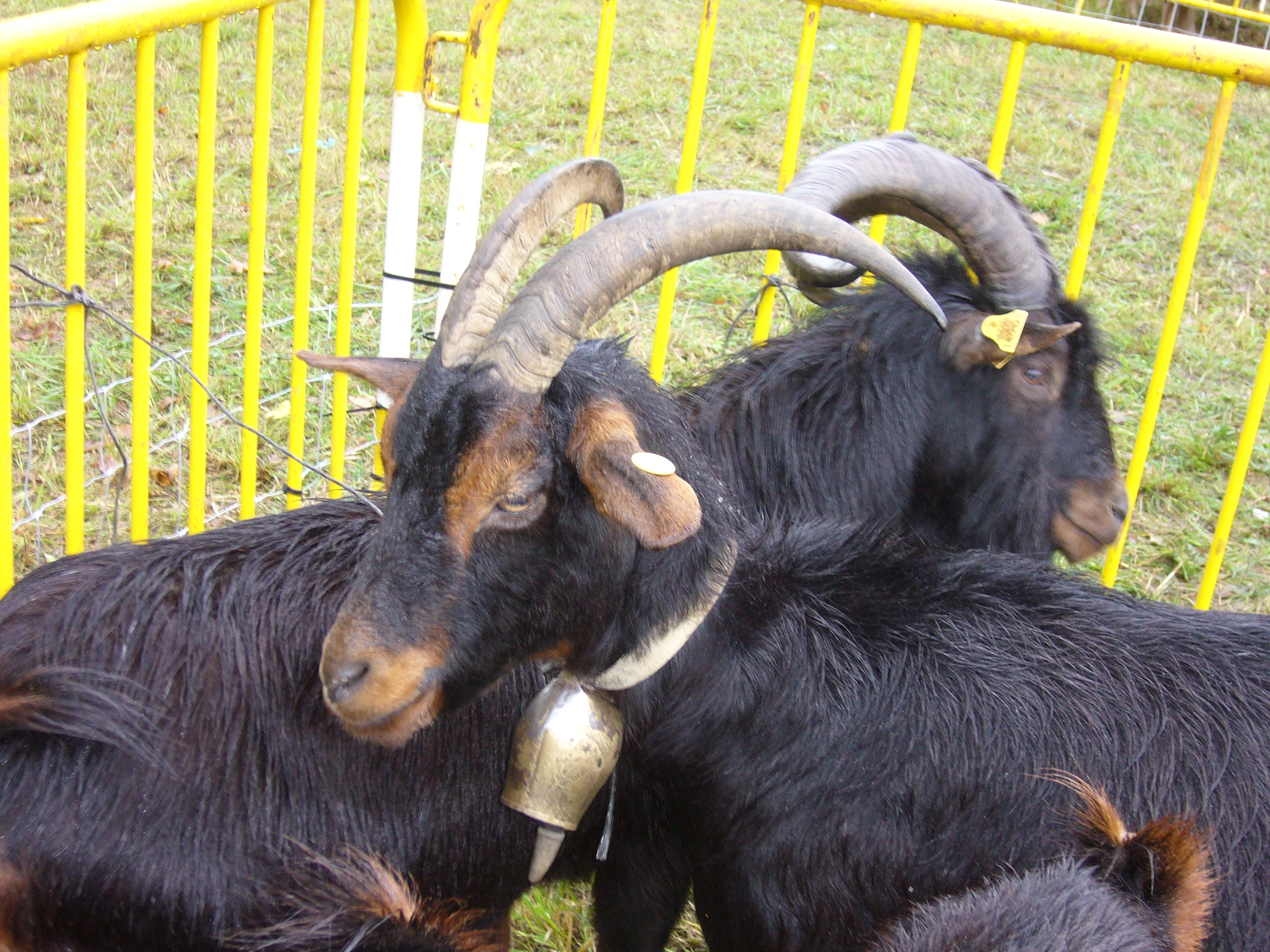
- Conservation status: FAO (2007): critical; DAD-IS (2021): at risk
- Other names: Azpi-Gorri
- Country of origin: Spain
- Distribution: Euskal Herria
- Use: goat's meat

Traits
- Weight: Male: 63 kg; Female: 43 kg
- Goat; Capra aegagrus hircus

The Azpi Gorri is a traditional Basque breed of domestic goat. It originates in the historical Basque Country, and is the only recognised goat breed of that area. It is distributed in the northern part of the province of Álava and in southern Bizkaia, with a few herds in the autonomous community of Navarre.

== History ==
The Azpi Gorri is a traditional breed of the Basque Country. By the late twentieth century it had become gravely endangered, with an estimated breeding population of 100. In 1997 it was added to the Catálogo Oficial de Razas de Ganado de España, the national register of livestock breeds of the Ministerio de Agricultura, Pesca y Alimentación, and in 2001 it was included in the official list of Basque breeds of the País Vasco.

A breed society, the Euskal Herriko Azpi Gorri Elkartea, was formed in 1999; it has kept the herd-book since 2007.

Also in 2007, the Azpi Gorri was added to the Ark of Taste of the Slow Food Foundation. The Ark of Taste also lists the Azpi Zuri, a colour variant with white lower parts rather than the characteristic red of the standard breed.

== Characteristics ==
The Azpi Gorri is of medium size. The coat is short and lustrous black with chestnut-red markings on the underbelly, the underside of the tail, the legs and the face – the Basque words azpi gorri mean approximately "with reddish lower parts". The facial profile is straight, and the ears are held more or less horizontally. The horns are arched in nannies, more corkscrew-shaped in billies; both sexes occasionally have tassels.
