= Monchina =

Spanish breed of cattle

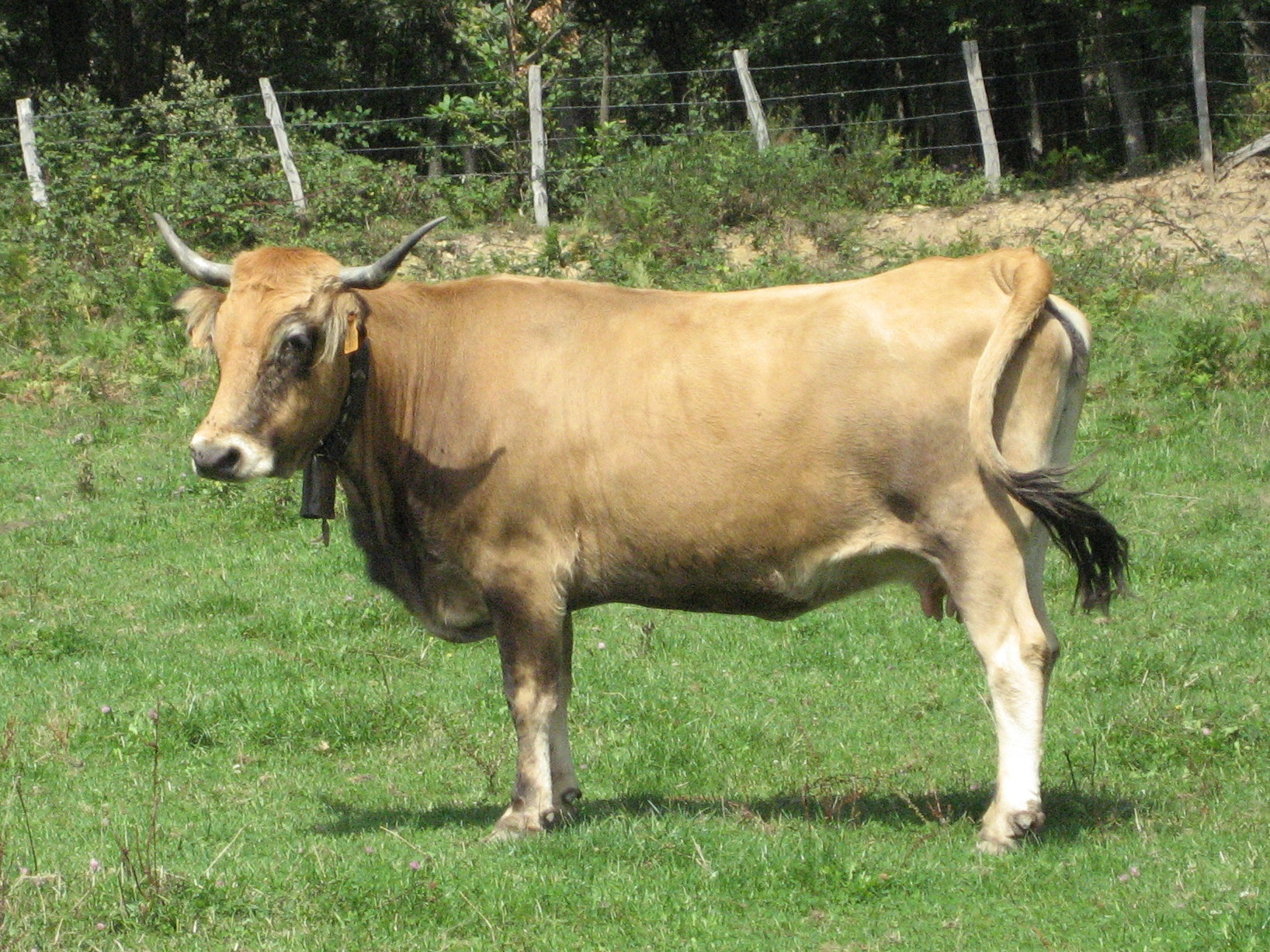
- Conservation status: FAO (2007): not at risk; DAD-IS (2021):at risk/endangered
- Other names: Basque: Behi montxina
- Country of origin: Spain
- Distribution: Cantabria; Bizkaia; Burgos
- Standard: Boletín Oficial del País Vasco; Boletín Oficial de Cantabria
- Use: beef

Traits
- Weight: Male: average 400 kg; Female: average 275 kg
- Height: Male: average 1.30 m; Female: average 1.25 m
- Horn status: horned
- Cattle; Bos (primigenius) taurus

The Monchina (Basque: Behi montxina) is a Spanish breed of mountain cattle indigenous to the autonomous communities of Cantabria and the Basque Country in northern Spain. It is related to the Betizu and possibly to the Terreña breeds of cattle of the Basque Country, and is closely associated with the Villano de las Encartaciones breed of dog, which is traditionally used in managing it. It is classified by the Ministerio de Agricultura, Pesca y Alimentación, the Spanish ministry of agriculture, as a "Raza Autóctona en Peligro de Extinción" or native breed at risk of extinction.

== History ==
The Monchina is a traditional breed of the mountains of the autonomous communities of Cantabria and of the Basque Country. It is distributed mainly in south-eastern Cantabria, in the comarca of Enkarterri in south-western Bizkaia, and in the northern part of the Province of Burgos in north-eastern Castile y León. It is closely associated with the municipalities of Castro Urdiales, Guriezo and Rasines in Cantabria; of Karrantza, Trucíos and the Cantabrian exclave of Villaverde de Trucíos in Bizkaia; and of Merindad de Sotoscueva and Valle de Mena in Burgos.

For many years extensive attempts were made to increase the meat yield by cross-breeding with more productive meat breeds such as the Spanish Asturiana de los Valles and the French Charolaise and Limousine. This led to a rapid reduction in the number of purebred stock, and in the 1990s the total breeding population was reported to consist of two hundred breeding cows and four or five bulls.
