= Pachón Navarro =

Spanish breed of dog

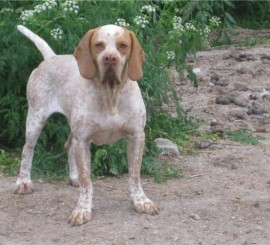
- Other names: Nafarroako eper txakur; Pachón; Pachón de Vitoria; Pachón español; Perdiguero común; Perdiguero navarro
- Origin: Navarre, Spain
Traits
- Height: 48–60 cm
	Males	average 55 cm
	Females	average 52 cm
- Weight: 20–30 kg
Kennel club standards
- Real Sociedad Canina de España: standard
- Gobierno de Navarra: standard

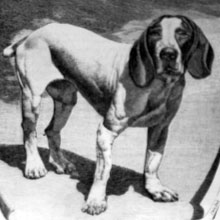
Pachón navarro (c. 1890)

The Pachón Navarro (Note: plural: Pachones Navarros; Basque: Nafarroako eper txakur) is a Spanish breed of hunting dog from the autonomous community of Navarre, in northern Spain. It is one of five Basque breeds of dog, the others being the Basque Shepherd Dog, the Erbi Txakur, the Villano de Las Encartaciones and the Villanuco de Las Encartaciones.

== History ==
The Pachón is believed to be among the oldest pointer dogs of the Iberian peninsula, with iconographic evidence going back to the Middle Ages. In the nineteenth century, as hunting became an occupation of the bourgeoisie, it became widespread through much of Spain under number of names such as Pachón, Pachón de Vitoria, Pachón español, Perdiguero común and Perdiguero navarro. Dogs of this type were exhibited in the earliest Spanish dog shows in the 1890s.

The Pachón was among the breeds recognised by the Real Sociedad Canina at its foundation in 1911, but by the 1970s was believed to be extinct. Efforts to recover it began with a census of surviving examples in 1979. In 1983 it was one of four Spanish dog breeds portrayed in an issue of postage stamps. A breed society, the Asociación Nacional Pro Recuperación del Pachón Navarro, was established in Laserna in Álava in 2001, followed by the Círculo de Cazadores y Criadores de Pachón Navarro in Pamplona in 2002. A breed standard was published by the government of Navarre in 2006, and in 2010 the Pachón was added to the list of dog breeds recognised by the Spanish government. It is not recognised by the Fédération Cynologique Internationale.

In 2009 the total breed population was estimated to be between 700 and 1000 dogs. In 2026 it was among the sixteen Spanish breeds considered by the Real Sociedad Canina de España to be vulnerable.

== Characteristics ==
The Pachón is usually short-haired. The coat is highly variable, and may be unicoloured, bicoloured or tricoloured. The most common colours are black-and-white, chestnut-and-white, liver-and-white and orange-and-white, all with patches and specks of colour on a white background.

A few examples display an unusual characteristic, a split or bifid nose, a trait shared with the Turkish Tarsus çatalburun and occasionally seen in South American dogs.
