= Erbi Txakur =

Spanish breed of dog

Erbi Txakurra
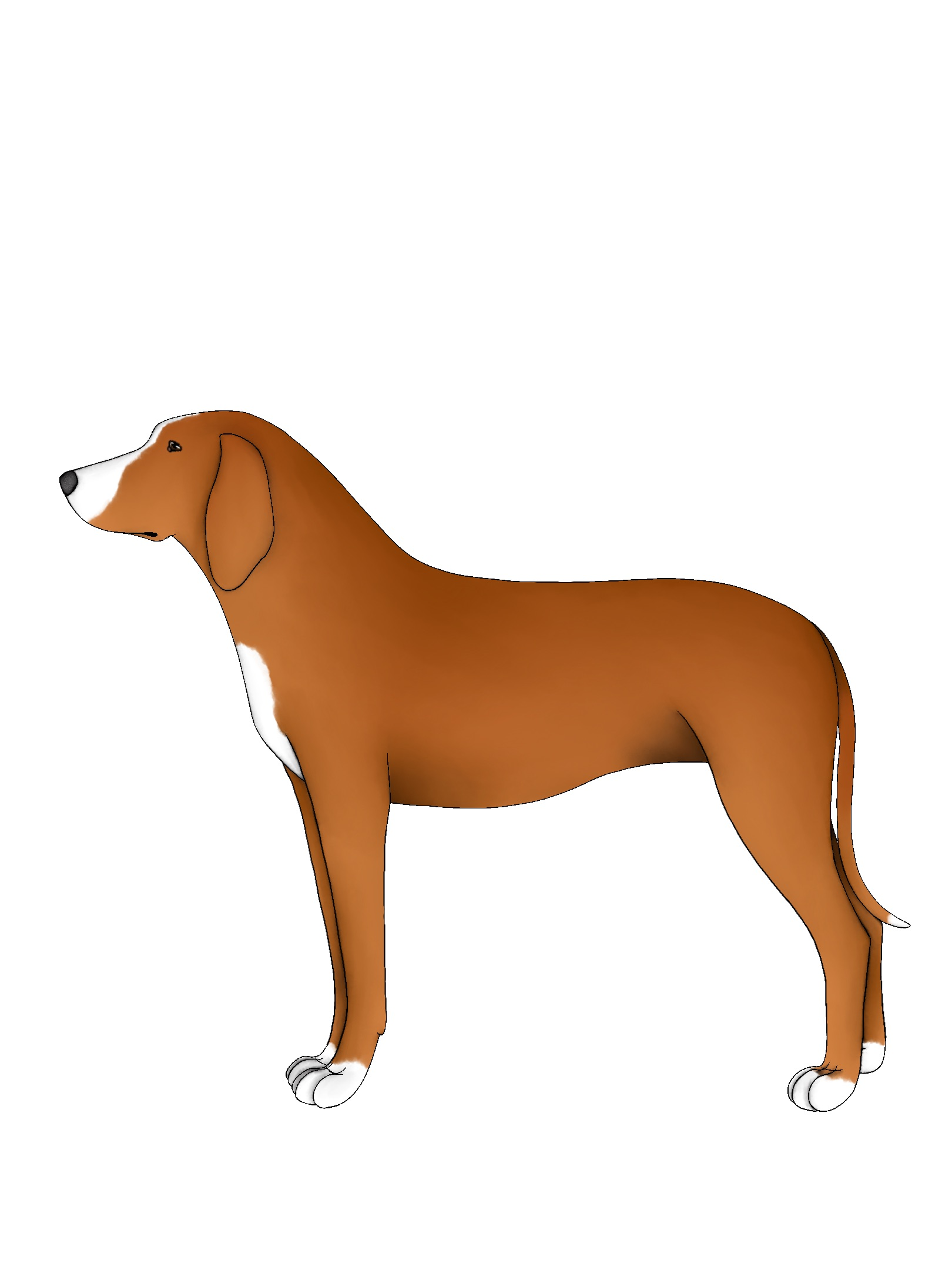
- A stylised illustration
- Other names: Braco Navarro; Braco Vasco; Braco Vizcaíno; Sabueso Navarro; Euskal Erbi Txakur; Sabueso Pirenaico
- Origin: Spain
- Notes: recognised in regional and national legislation

The Erbi Txakurra is a Spanish breed of scenthound. It originates in the provinces of Álava and Bizkaia in the Basque Autonomous Community in northern Spain. It is one of five Basque breeds of dog, the others being the Basque Shepherd Dog, the Pachón de Vitoria, the Villano de Las Encartaciones and the Villanuco de Las Encartaciones, and is one of fourteen animal breeds native to the Paîs Vasco. It was traditionally used for hunting hare, but since the hare became scarce in the Basque country it is more frequently used to hunt wild boar, roe deer or occasionally foxes.

It is critically endangered: in 2009 there were fewer than fifty examples.

== History ==
The Erbi Txakurra originates in the provinces of Álava and Bizkaia in the Basque Autonomous Community in northern Spain, and is the traditional hare-hunting dog of Basque hunters; the name of the breed means 'hare dog'. It is one of five Basque breeds of dog, the others being the Basque Shepherd Dog, the Pachón de Vitoria, the Villano de Las Encartaciones and the Villanuco de Las Encartaciones. Of these, all but the Pachón de Vitoria are indigenous to the Basque Autonomous Community, and were recognised as traditional Basque breeds by government decree in 2001. It was among the fourteen indigenous animal breeds included in the rural development plan for the País Vasco for 2007–2013.

With the Villanuco de Las Encartaciones it is one of the most seriously endangered breeds of the Basque Country: in 2009 there were fewer than fifty examples.

== Characteristics ==
The Erbi Txakurra is of medium size. It is somewhat smaller than the Sabueso Español but more muscular, and does not have such long ears. The coat is short and of a uniform pale orange-brown with irregular white markings, usually on the face, the chest, the paws and the tip of the tail. The nose and palate are pigmented, the eyes are chestnut-brown.

== Use ==
The Erbi Txakurra was traditionally used for hunting hare, but since the hare became scarce in the Basque country it is mainly used to hunt wild boar; it may also be used in hunting roe deer or occasionally foxes.
