= Betizu =

Basque breed of cattle

- Bull on Adarra

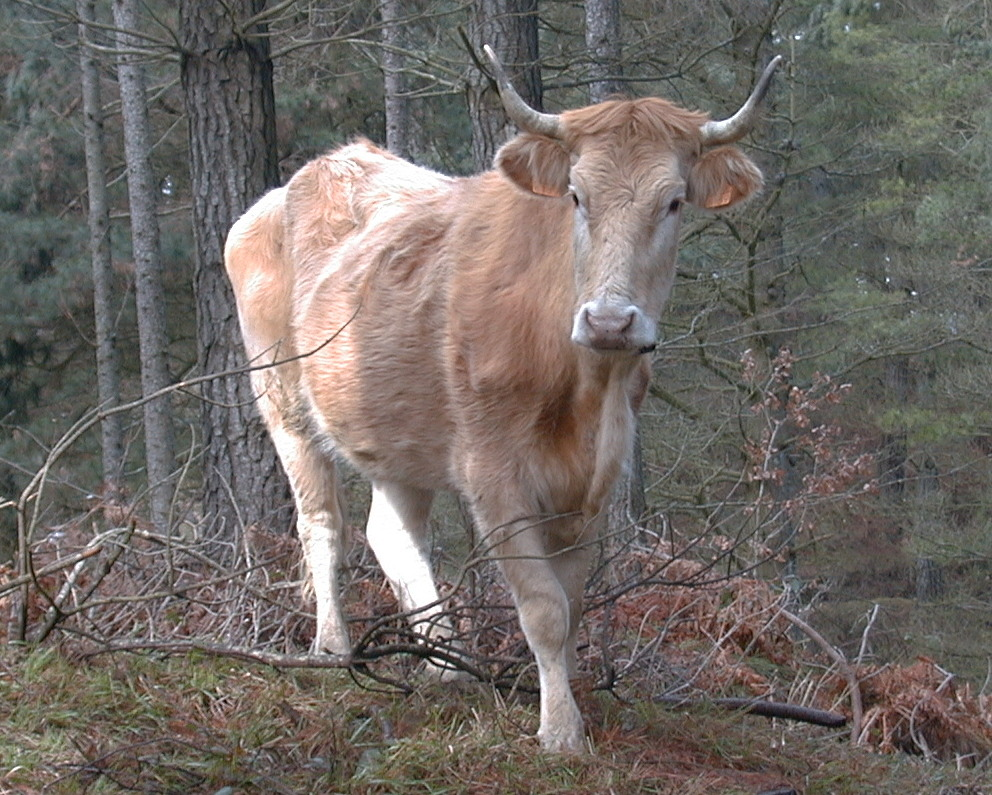
- Cow in Alava
- Conservation status: France: FAO (2007): critical; DAD-IS (2024): at risk/critical; Spain: FAO (2007): endangered; DAD-IS (2024): at risk/endangered
- Other names: Betizuak
- Country of origin: Spain; France
- Distribution: Bizkaia; Gipuzkoa; Nafarroa; Labourd, Pyrénées-Atlantiques
- Standard: Gobierno de Navarra (in Spanish)
- Use: meat; vegetation management

Traits
- Weight: Male: 400–500 kg (900–1100 lb); Female: 300–350 kg (700–800 lb)
- Height: Male: 130 cm (51 in); Female: 120 cm (47 in)
- Skin colour: creamy white
- Coat: russet brown
- Horn status: horned
- Cattle; Bos (primigenius) taurus

The Betizu is a Basque breed of small mountain cattle which live in a semi-feral state in some mountainous parts of the Basque Country in both Spain and France. It is classified as an endangered breed by both the Ministerio de Agricultura, Pesca y Alimentación, the agriculture ministry of Spain, and by the Conservatoire des Races d'Aquitaine in France.

It is one of a small number of semi-feral cattle populations in Europe, with the Albera of the Pyrenees, the Monchina of Cantabria, and the Raço di Biòu of the Camargue.

== History ==
The origins of the Betizu are unknown. The name betizu derives from the Basque: behi izua, 'elusive cow', and distinguishes it from the etxebehi or 'house cow'. It appears in Basque mythology as Zezengorri ('red bull'), guardian of the treasure of the goddess Mari.

The Betizu is sometimes believed to be the remnant of an ancient Pyrenean cattle population adapted to survive in marginal mountain terrain; or it may derive from animals lost or escaped during the annual transhumance.

In the twenty-first century it is an endangered breed, and in Navarre was listed as such in 2003. At about the same time the Government of Navarre established a conservation herd at the finca of Sastoia in Urraúl Alto, in the comarca of Lumbier; management of the herd was later handed over to the Instituto Navarro de Tecnologías e Infraestructuras Agroalimentarias.

In 2013, the breed population in Navarre was estimated at 254, while the number in Aquitaine was put at less than 150. In 2023 a total of 1267 head was reported from Spain, including 688 cows and 50 bulls registered in the herd-book, distributed over 41 herds; for France a population of 80–100 head was reported. The conservation status for Spain was listed as "at risk/endangered", while for France it was "at risk/critical".
