= Tarsus çatalburun =

Turkish dog breed

Tarsus Çatalburun
- Other names: Turkish Pointer, Tarsus Fork-nose
- Origin: Turkey
Traits
- Height: 48–50 cm (19–20 in)
- Weight: 20–25 kg (44–55 lb)
- Color: brown, brown and white, black and white, black.

The Tarsus çatalburun or Turkish Pointer is a native hound of Turkey most recognizable for its split or bifid nose. The word "çatalburuns" means forked nose. It is a very rare breed with only a few hundred specimens. The Tarsus çatalburun is not recognized by any kennel club.

== History ==
Mersin Province, Turkey

The breed is associated with the town of Tarsus, in Mersin Province, which is located on the Mediterranean coast where they have been bred for hundreds of years to hunt upland game.

Due to the shared split nose trait as well as conformation and hunting style, it is theorized that the Tarsus çatalburuns and Pachón Navarro share a common origin in the 8th century when southern Turkey and Spain were both under the rule of the Umayyad Caliphate and Abbasid Caliphate. There is considerable debate if the Tarsus çatalburuns is the ancestor to the Pachon Navarro or vice versa.

== Features ==
Tarsus çatalburuns have a split nose, a rare genetic trait shared by two other breeds: the Spanish Pachón Navarro and the Bolivian Andean Tiger Hound. The left and right nostrils are separated by a deep indentation or cleft, often creating the illusion of having two noses with one nare each.

The coat is short and comes in a variety of colors, brown being the most common followed by brown and white, liver and white, black and white and black. Tarsus çatalburuns are medium to large sized dogs, around 48–50 centimetres (19–20 in) in height with a deep chest and an athletic build. They have drooping ears that frame the face, and a long, straight tail. They weigh 20–25 kilograms (44–55 lb).

The Tarsus çatalburun has a very acute sense of smell, which is thought to be accentuated by the particular structure of the nose. They are able to track scents on both the ground and in the air, with studies finding that most Tarsus çatalburuns use both styles concurrently. They are particularly skilled in scent hunting as a pointing dog, especially in partridge and francolin hunting. In recent years, Tarsus çatalburuns have been trained as detection dogs for narcotics, explosives and search and rescue. Tarsus çatalburuns begin training to hunt by 6–7 months, with puppies as young as two months displaying pointing ability.

Tarsus çatalburun are highly intelligent and obedient dogs, calm and quiet at home but energetic in the field.

== Health ==
The Tarsus çatalburuns can suffer from hip dysplasia, allergies and hypothyroidism.

== See also ==
- Pachón Navarro
