= Villanuco de Las Encartaciones =

Spanish breed of dog

- Other names: Basque: Enkarterriko Billanuko; Cantabrian: Villanucu
- Origin: Spain
Traits
Height	Males	30–40 cm
- Weight: 4–8.5 kg

The Villanuco de Las Encartaciones (Basque: Enkarterriko Billanuko, Cantabrian: Villanucu) is a Spanish breed of small dog of ratter type. It originates in the comarca of Enkarterri (Spanish: Las Encartaciones) in the Basque Autonomous Community in northern Spain. It is one of five Basque breeds of dog, the others being the Basque Shepherd Dog, the Erbi Txakur, the Pachón Navarro and the Villano de Las Encartaciones, and one of fourteen animal breeds native to the País Vasco.

It is critically endangered: in 2009 there were fewer than fifty examples.

== History ==
The Villanuco originates in the comarca of Enkarterri/Las Encartaciones in Bizkaia, in the Basque Autonomous Community in northern Spain. It is one of five Basque breeds of dog, the others being the Basque Shepherd Dog or Euskal Artzain Txakurra, the Erbi Txakur, the Pachón de Vitoria and the Villano de Las Encartaciones or Enkarterriko Billano. Of these, all but the Pachón de Vitoria are indigenous to the Basque Autonomous Community, and were recognised as traditional Basque breeds by government decree in 2001. It was among the fourteen indigenous animal breeds included in the rural development plan for the País Vasco for 2007–2013.

The Villanuco is critically endangered: in 2009 the total number for the breed was reported to be below fifty. Almost all are in the comarca of Enkarterri/Las Encartaciones – in Artzentales, Balmaseda, Güeñes, Karrantza, Sopuerta and Trucios-Turtzioz.

== Characteristics ==
The Villanuco is one of several ratting breeds in Spain. It shows some similarity to the Ca Rater Mallorquí of Mallorca and to the Gos Rater Valencià, but is phenotypically less similar to them than they are to each other.

It is a small breed: dogs stand 30–40 cm at the withers, bitches a little less. The skin is fine and close-fitting, and the coat is short, little more than 1 cm long. It is most often black and white or black and tan, less frequently black and cinnamon, white and cinnamon, or tri-coloured; the nose is usually black, but may also be chocolate-coloured. The ears are usually upright.

== Use ==
The Villanuco was traditionally used for ratting. It is a good watchdog, alert to the presence of strangers or intruders, and may be kept for that reason or as a companion dog.
