= Lumbier =

Lumbier / Irunberri Ilumberri
- Municipality
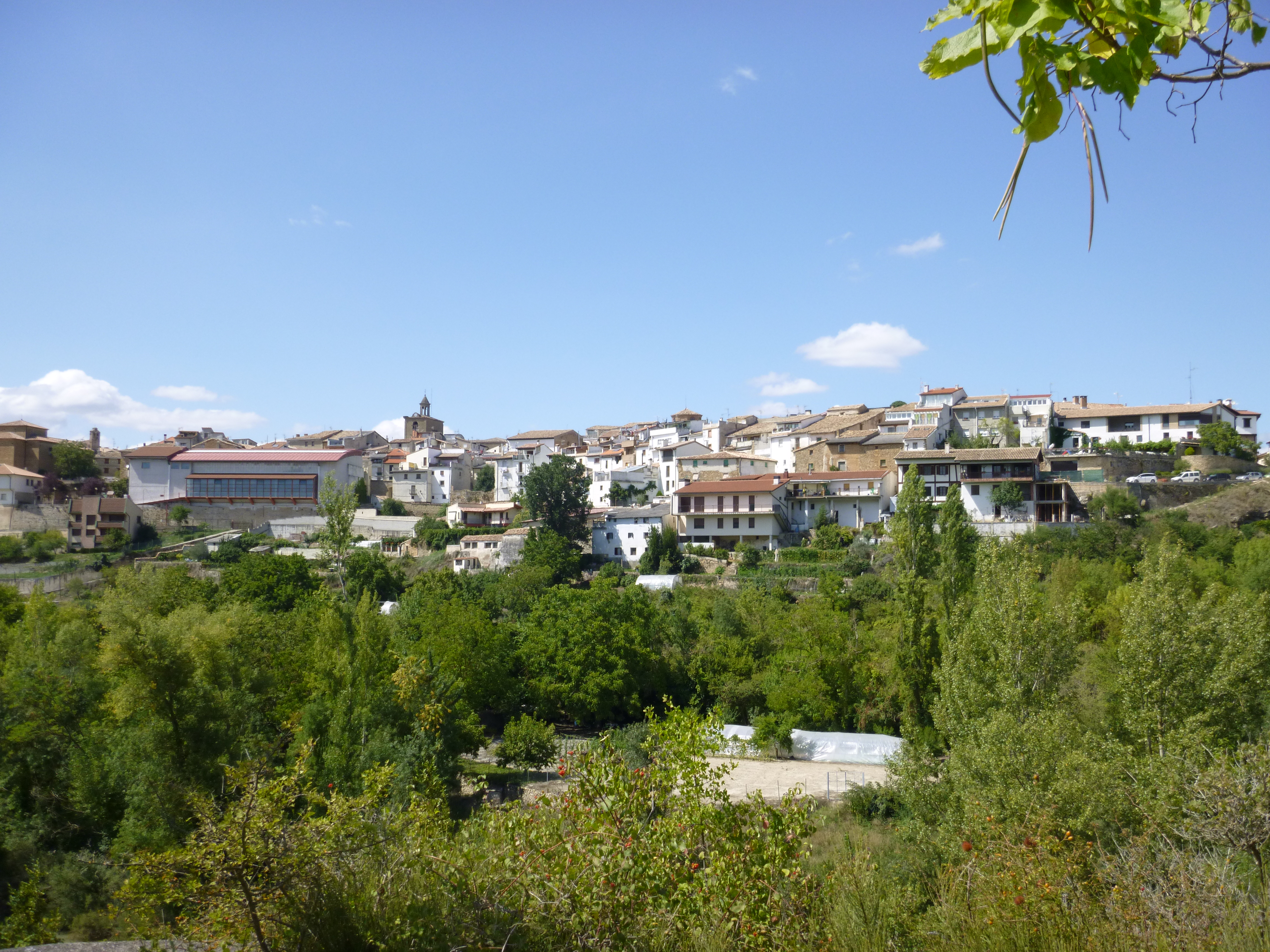

- Flag Coat of arms

- Location in Spain Lumbier / Irunberri (Spain)
- Coordinates: 42°39′15″N 1°18′20″W
- Country: Spain
- Autonomous Community: Navarre
- Province: Navarre
- Comarca: Comarca de Lumbier

Government
  - Mayor: Javier Mauro Gogorcena Aoiz (Agrupación Independiente de Lumbier)

Area
  - Total: 57.40 km^{2} (22.16 sq mi)
- Elevation (AMSL): 467 m (1,532 ft)

Population (2025-01-01)
  - Total: 1,330
  - Density: 23.2/km^{2} (60.0/sq mi)
- Time zone: UTC+1 (CET)
  - Summer (DST): UTC+2 (CEST (GMT +2))
- Postal code: 31440
- Area code: +34 (Spain) + 948 (Navarre)
- Website: www.lumbier.es

Lumbier (Irunberri in Basque language) is a village and municipality in the province and autonomous community of Navarre, in the north of Spain, 38 km from the capital of the community, Pamplona. It has a population of about 1400. It stands on the River Salazar in a region of natural interest. It also has interesting historical connections.

== Place name ==
It is believed that the present village of Lumbier goes back to ancient times to the communities of the Vascones mentioned by Roman geographers such as Pliny the Elder which included those known as the iluberritani, which traditionally have been associated with the village of Lumbier. Some Roman remains have been found in Lumbier and the remains of a Roman and Celtic villa have been found in the nearby municipality of Liédena.

Starting from its ancient name of Ilumberri, linguists have reconstructed the development of its present forms.

- In the Romance Languages: Ilumberri -> Lumberri -> Lumbier.
- In the Basque Language: Ilumberri -> Irunberri.

Regarding the etymological significance of Ilumberri, it is believed that it comes from archaic Basque. The first part seems to be the same as in place names such as Irún or Iruña (Pamplona), and it has been traditionally associated with the word hiri o (h)ili (town) in Basque. The second part berri means 'new'; thus its etymological meaning would be similar to 'new town'.

At present, Lumbier is located in the non-basque-speaking area of Navarre, so its Castilian name is the only official one, though the place-name "Irunberri" is still used. The inhabitants of Lumbier are generally erroneously referred to as "gatos" ('cats'); the correct expression is "ahorcagatos" (cat-hangers'), which dates back to the Spanish War of Independence, when a number of French sympathisers from Madrid ("cats") were caught trying to flee to France and they were hanged here.

== Symbols ==
=== Coat of arms ===
The coat of arms of Lumbier has the following blazon:

A castle with three towers argent each with three crenellations on an azure field. The central tower is higher than the side ones. The castle is flanked by an eight-pointed star sinister and a reversed crescent argent dexter.

The ancient seal of the village has, in addition to those items just mentioned, a crescent sinister and a star dexter to the central tower, and appears in the Charter of Union (Carta de Unión) which was signed by all the towns and villages of Navarre at Puente la Reina in 1328.

== Geography ==
=== Location ===
Lumbier is located in the western part of the autonomous region of Navarre at an altitude of 467 metres above sea level. Its municipal area has an area of 57.40 km^{2} and has borders on the northern side with the municipalities of Urraúl Bajo and Romanzado, on the eastern side with the latter, on the southern side with those of Yesa, Liédena and Sangüesa and on the western side with that of Urraúl Alto.

=== Topology and hydrology ===
Two deep gorges(Foz) with rock faces of up to 300 metres high have been created by the Rivers Salazar and Irati in the foothills of the Sierra de Leire. The surrounding area consists of a wide valley with wheatfields, low Mediterranean countryside and Holm oak woods. There is deciduous and Common-pine woodland in the higher areas of Arangoiti (Sierra de Leire).

This area falls in the Site of Community Importance (Natura 2000 Network) and ZEPA (Special Bird Protection Area) "Sierra de Leire-Foz de Arbayún" which includes the "Arbayún Gorge", the "Lumbier Gorge" and "Acantilados de la Piedra y San Adrián" Natural Reserves.

It is located on the right bank of river Salazar and near the left bank of the river Irati where it joins the river Salazar, on a flat hill which is 467 metres high. between a loamy hollow and a north-west outcrop of the Sierra de Leire.

== Economy ==
Nordex has a rotor blade production facility in Lumbier. In April 2025, the NYT published a picture of the inside of the plant where workers build wind turbine blades that are more than 200 feet long.
