= Villano de Las Encartaciones =

Spanish breed of dog

Villano de las Encartaciones
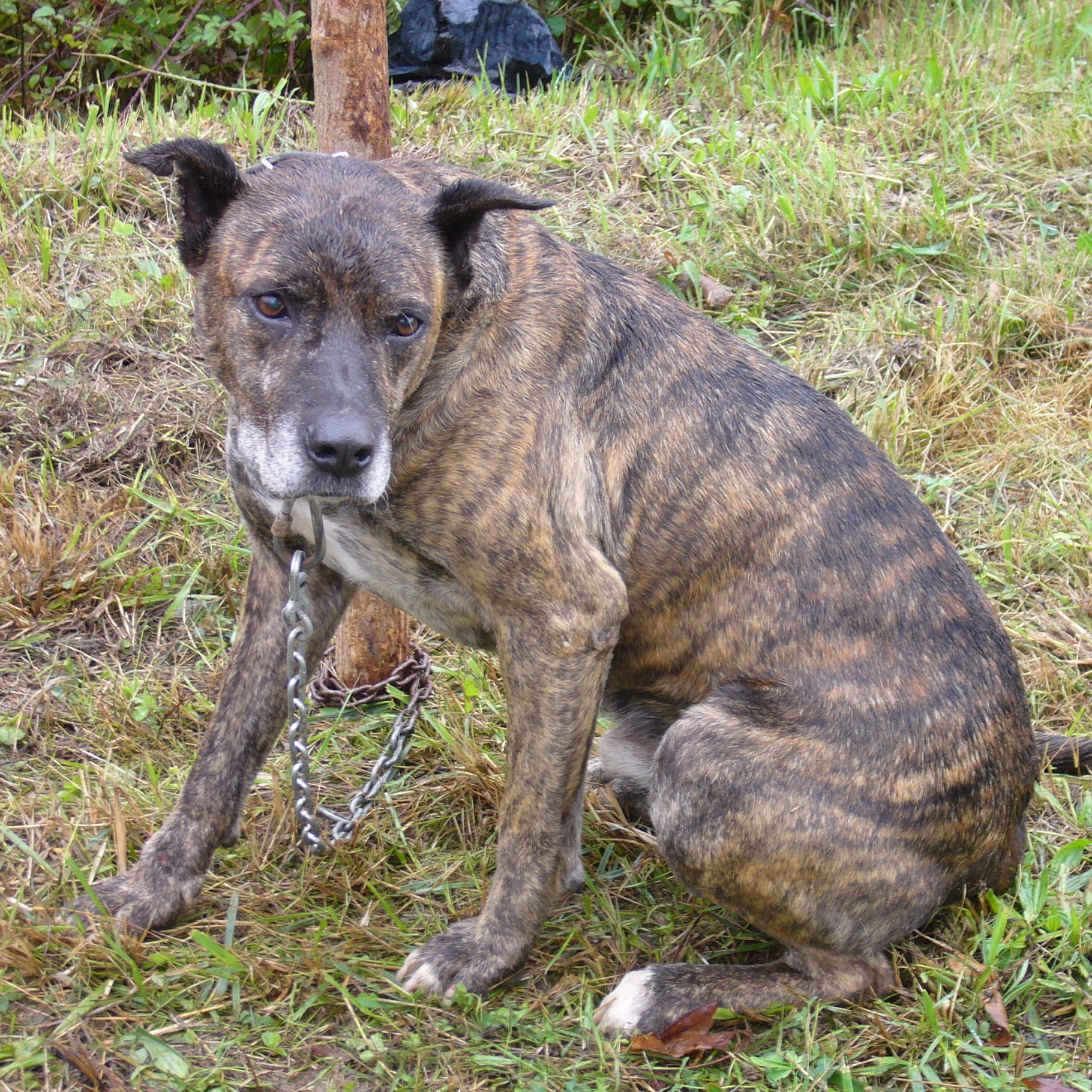
- In Ormaiztegi, Gipuzkoa
- Other names: Basque: Enkarterriko billano; Cantabrian: Villanu
- Origin: Spain
- Distribution: Basque Country
Traits
Height	Males	57–60 cm
	Females	55–57 cm
- Notes: Recognised in Spanish law

The Villano de Las Encartaciones is a Spanish breed of large working dog from the region of Las Encartaciones in the province of Biscay, in the Basque Country; it is found also in Álava, in eastern Cantabria and in northern Burgos. The traditional use of the dogs is in management of cattle of the Monchina breed of Cantabria and the País Vasco, and particularly to assist with bringing the cattle down from the mountain pastures between October and December. In 2009 there were fewer than 200 dogs registered in the stud-book.

It is one of five Basque breeds of dog, the others being the Basque Shepherd Dog, the Erbi Txakur, the Pachón Navarro and the Villanuco de Las Encartaciones.

== History ==
The Villano is a traditional working dog of the region of Las Encartaciones in the province of Biscay, in the Basque Country, and to some extent also of Álava, of eastern Cantabria and of northern Burgos. Its history is inextricably entwined with that of the Monchina breed of mountain cattle of that region; the association between the two is so close that it has been said that "one breed could not exist without the other".

It was formerly a smaller dog than it is today. The traditional method of capturing Monchina cattle in the mountains of Bizkaia involved the use of two types or breeds of dog: the Villano was used to cut out and drive the cattle chosen by the ganaderos to a point where they could be caught by larger and heavier Alano Español dogs. From the 1960s, rather than use two breeds of which neither could perform the function of the other, breeders began to cross-breed them in the hope of combining the capabilities of both in a single animal; this gave rise to the modern Villano. A breed society, the Club Nacional del Villano de Las Encartaciones, was formed in 1997.

It is one of five Basque breeds of dog, the others being the Basque Shepherd Dog, the Erbi Txakur, the Pachón de Vitoria and the Villanuco de Las Encartaciones. Of these, all but the Pachón de Vitoria are indigenous to the Basque Autonomous Community, and were recognised as traditional Basque breeds by government decree in 2001. A breed standard for the Villano was published in the Boletín Oficial del País Vasco in 2003, and in 2005 it was added to the list of dog breeds recognised by the national government of Spain. It was among the fourteen indigenous animal breeds included in the rural development plan for the País Vasco for 2007–2013. It is not recognised by the Real Sociedad Canina de España, the national Spanish kennel club, but is listed among the Spanish breeds in the process of recovery.

With the Erbi Txakur it is one of the most gravely endangered breeds of the Basque Country: in 2009 there were fewer than 200 dogs registered in the stud-book.

== Characteristics ==
Dogs stand some 57–60 cm at the withers, bitches about 55–57 cm. The coat hair is hard, straight and short – between 1 and 3 cm long – and forms a dense coat which lies close to the body. The colour is brindled fawn, ranging from pale to dark.

== Use ==
The traditional use of the dogs is in management of the Monchina breed of cattle of Cantabria and the Paìs Vasco, and particularly to assist with bringing the cattle down from the mountain pastures between October and December. The association between the dog breed and the cattle breed is so close that it has been said that "one breed could not exist without the other". In the twenty-first century it may also be kept as a companion dog.
