= Terreña =

Spanish breed of cattle

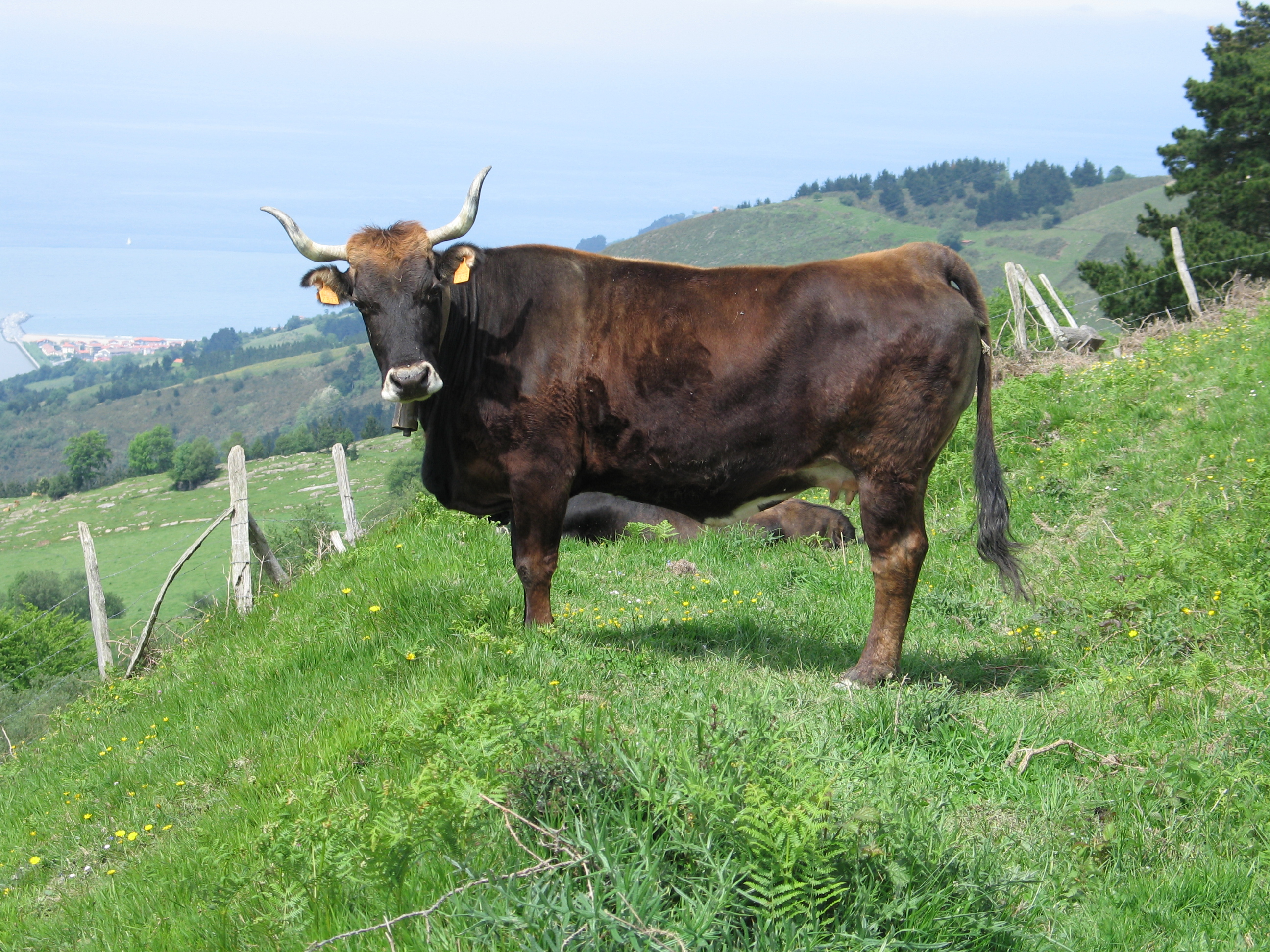
- Terreña cow near Zumaia, in Gipuzkoa
- Conservation status: FAO (2007): endangered
- Other names: Basque: Behi terreña
- Country of origin: Spain
- Distribution: Álava; Bizkaia; Gipuzkoa
- Standard: Consejero de Agricultura y Pesca (in Basque and Spanish)
- Use: formerly: triple-purpose, meat, milk and draught; now: meat; also: idi probak (arrastre de piedra)

Traits
- Skin colour: black
- Coat: brown
- Horn status: horned
- Cattle; Bos (primigenius) taurus

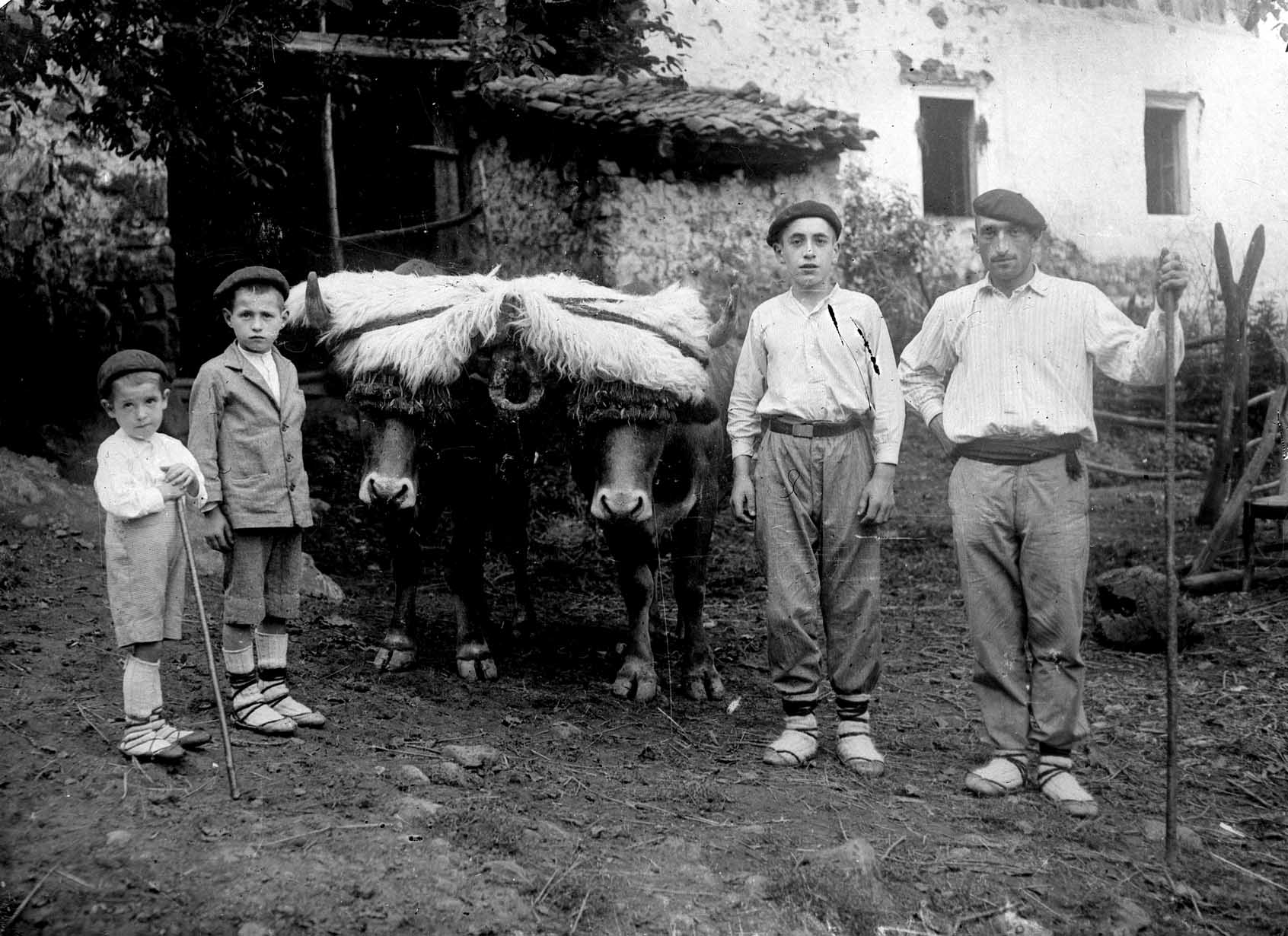
Yoked pair of Terreño oxen (date unknown)

The Terreña, Basque: Behi terreña, is an endangered Spanish breed of mountain cattle indigenous to the autonomous community of the Basque Country in northern Spain. It is distributed mostly in the provinces of Álava and Bizkaia, with some localised populations in Gipuzkoa.

== History ==
The Terreña originates in the northern part of the province of Álava and the southern part of that of Bizkaia; some are found in the comarca of Enkarterri in Bizkaia, and there are some localised populations in Gipuzkoa. The Terreña was formerly found in large numbers, and was the most numerous breed in these areas; in the mid-twentieth century there were over 15000 head. The industrialisation of agriculture and depopulation of rural areas in the latter part of that century led to an acute fall in numbers, and in 1991 the population was reported to be 208 head. Conservation efforts began in the 1990s. The Terreña breed received official recognition on 9 December 2003.

The Terreña is among the breeds classified as "at risk of extinction" by the Ministerio de Agricultura, Alimentación y Medio Ambiente, the Spanish ministry of agriculture. At the end of 2014 the total population was recorded as 2474, of which 2260 were female and 214 male.

== Use and management ==
The Terreña was formerly a triple-purpose breed, used as a draught animal and for milk and meat production, but is now raised only for meat. Terreño oxen were in the past used in the traditional Basque rural sport of idi probak, or stone-pulling.

The cattle are traditionally managed extensively, ranging freely on mountain pasture from April to November, and spending the winter months at pasture in the neighbouring valleys.
