= Pirenaica =

Spanish breed of cattle

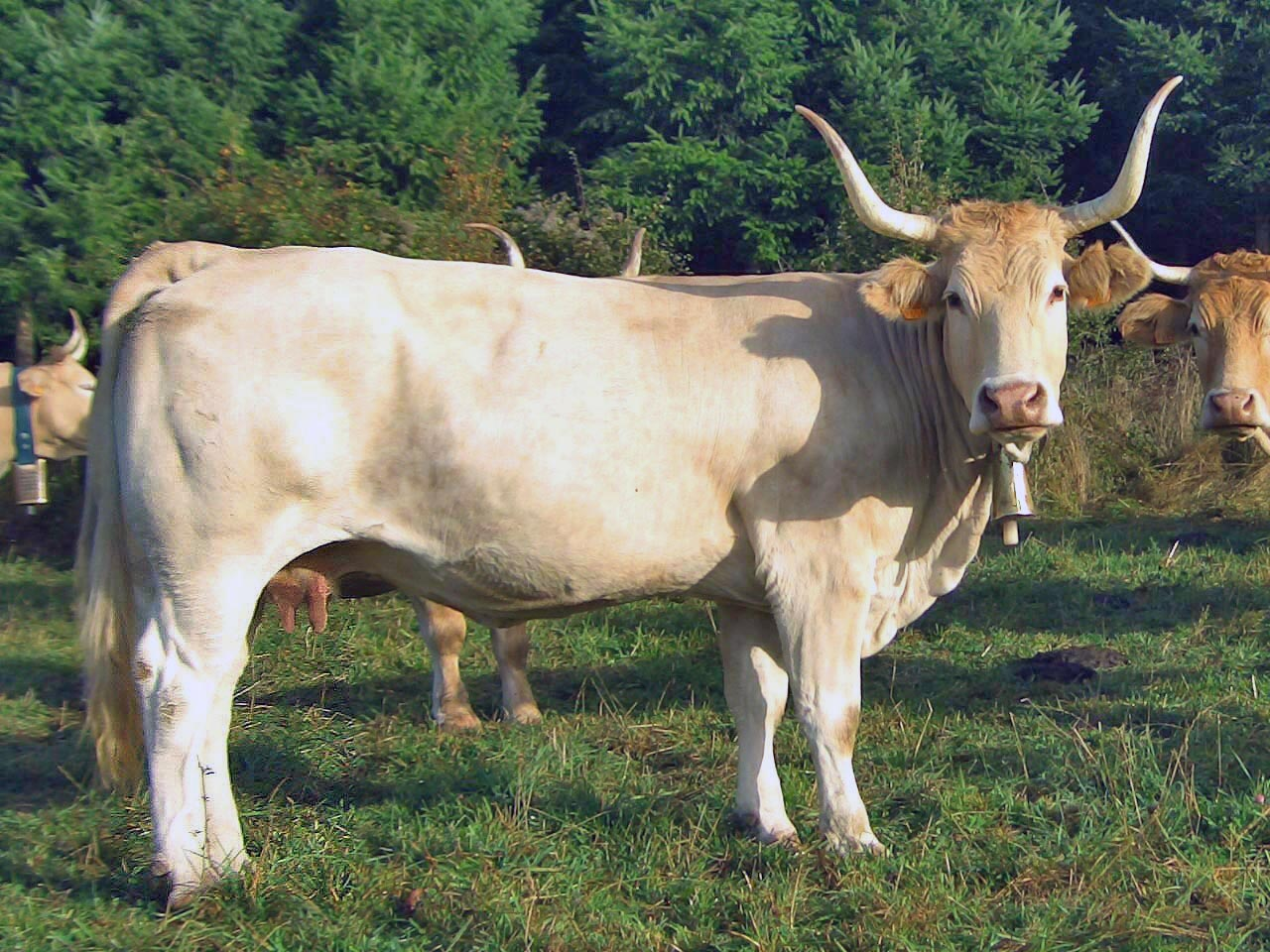
- Cow near Ezcároz in Navarre

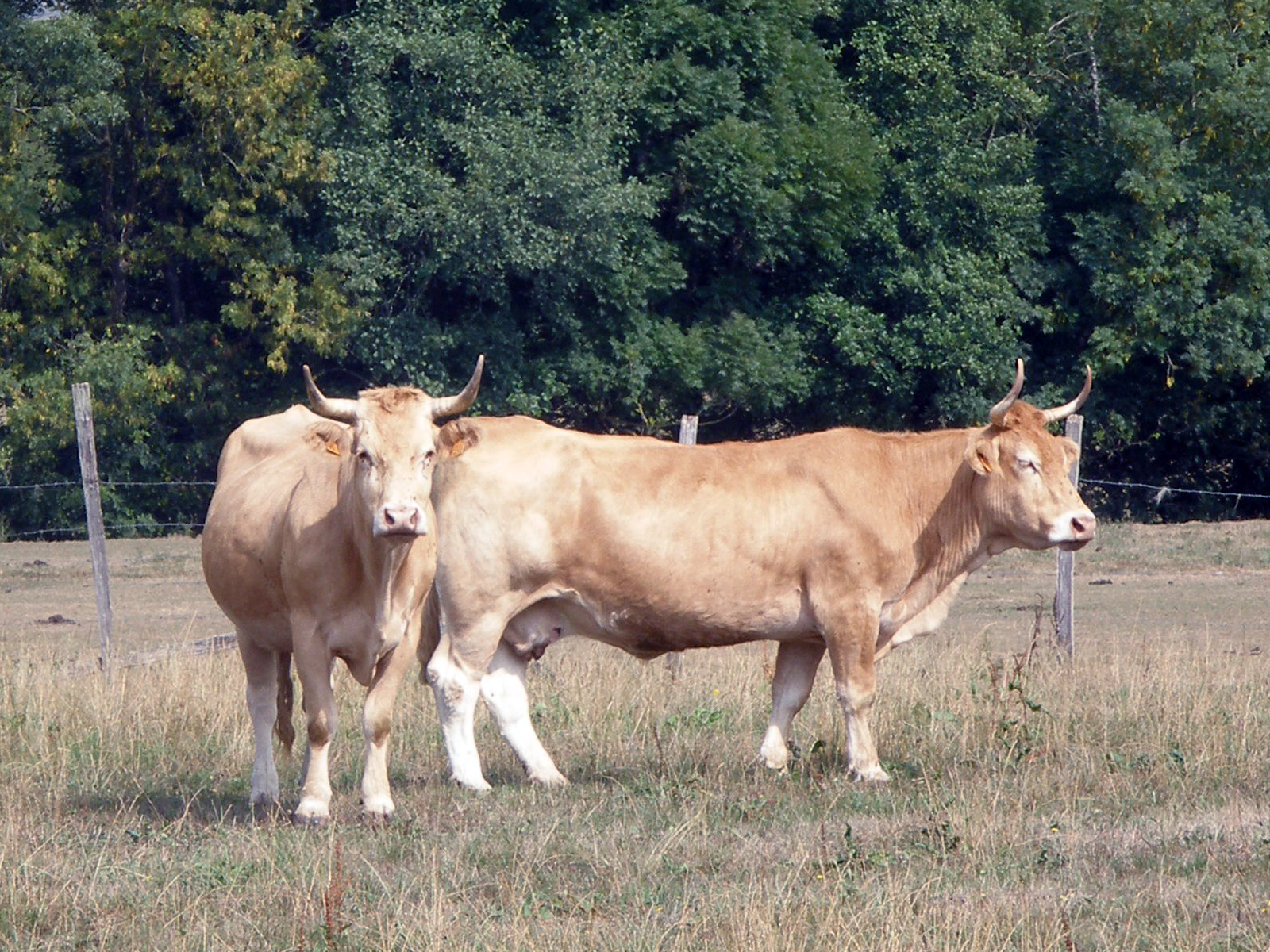
- Cows at pasture in the comarca of Baztán in Navarre
- Conservation status: FAO (2007): not at risk
- Other names: Basque: Behi-gorri
- Country of origin: Spain
- Distribution: northern Catalonia
- Standard: Confederación de Asociaciones de Ganado Vacuno Pirenaico (in Spanish)
- Use: mainly meat

Traits
- Weight: Male: 800 kg; Female: 525 kg
- Height: Male: 150 cm; Female: 132 cm
- Coat: wheaten
- Horn status: horned
- Cattle; Bos (primigenius) taurus

The Pirenaica, Basque: Behi-gorri, is a Spanish breed of beef cattle indigenous to the Pyrenees of north-eastern Spain. It is distributed mainly in the autonomous communities of Navarre and the Basque Country, but is present in much of the northern part of the country. It is well adapted to the mountainous terrain and humid climate of the area. It came close to extinction in twentieth century, but is no longer at risk.

== History ==
The origins of the Pirenaica are uncertain. In the past it was the predominant cattle breed of northern Spain. A herd-book was opened in Gipuzkoa in 1905, the first of its kind in Spain; in 1925 a herd-book was opened in Navarre also. However, from about the turn of the twentieth century, large-scale importation of Braunvieh cattle from Switzerland began to threaten the breed; while at first these were pure-bred, they soon began to be cross-bred with the Pirenaica to improve meat and milk yield. In 1912 a census of cattle in Gipuzkoa found about 50000 head, of which less than 40% were pure-bred Pirenaica stock; the remainder were Braunvieh and Braunvieh-Pirenaica crosses, in roughly equal proportions. In 1954 there were 18000 head, but by the 1970s the Pirenaica was close to extinction. In 1974 it had disappeared from the Basque Country, with the exception of about 40 head in Gipuzkoa; in Navarre about 1500 head remained, of which about 1000 were in the valley of Aezkoa.

In the 1970s the Diputación Foral of Navarre began a programme of recovery of the Pirenaica breed. A number of regional breeders' associations were set up; a national federation of these, the Confederación de Asociaciones de Ganado Vacuno Pirenaico, was formed in 1988. At the end of 2014 the total population was recorded as 40026, of which 34806 were female and 5220 were male. Of these, about 50% were in Navarre and 25% in the Basque Country; there were substantial populations in Aragón, Cantabria and Castilla León, and smaller numbers in Catalonia, the Comunitat Valenciana, Extremadura, La Rioja, Madrid and the Principado de Asturias. By the end of 2023 numbers had fallen to 33241 head in all, including 22887 registered breeding cows and 981 active registered bulls.

The Pirenaica is classified among the "autochthonous breeds in development" by the Ministerio de Agricultura, Alimentación y Medio Ambiente, the Spanish ministry of agriculture, and thus at less risk of extinction.

== Use ==
The Pirenaica was formerly a triple-purpose breed, used as a draught animal and for milk and meat production. While breeding selection is now wholly towards meat production, Pirenaica oxen may sometimes be used in the traditional rural sport of arrastre de piedra, or stone-dragging.
