= Urraúl Alto =

Municipality in Spain

Coordinates: 42.759°N 1.254°W

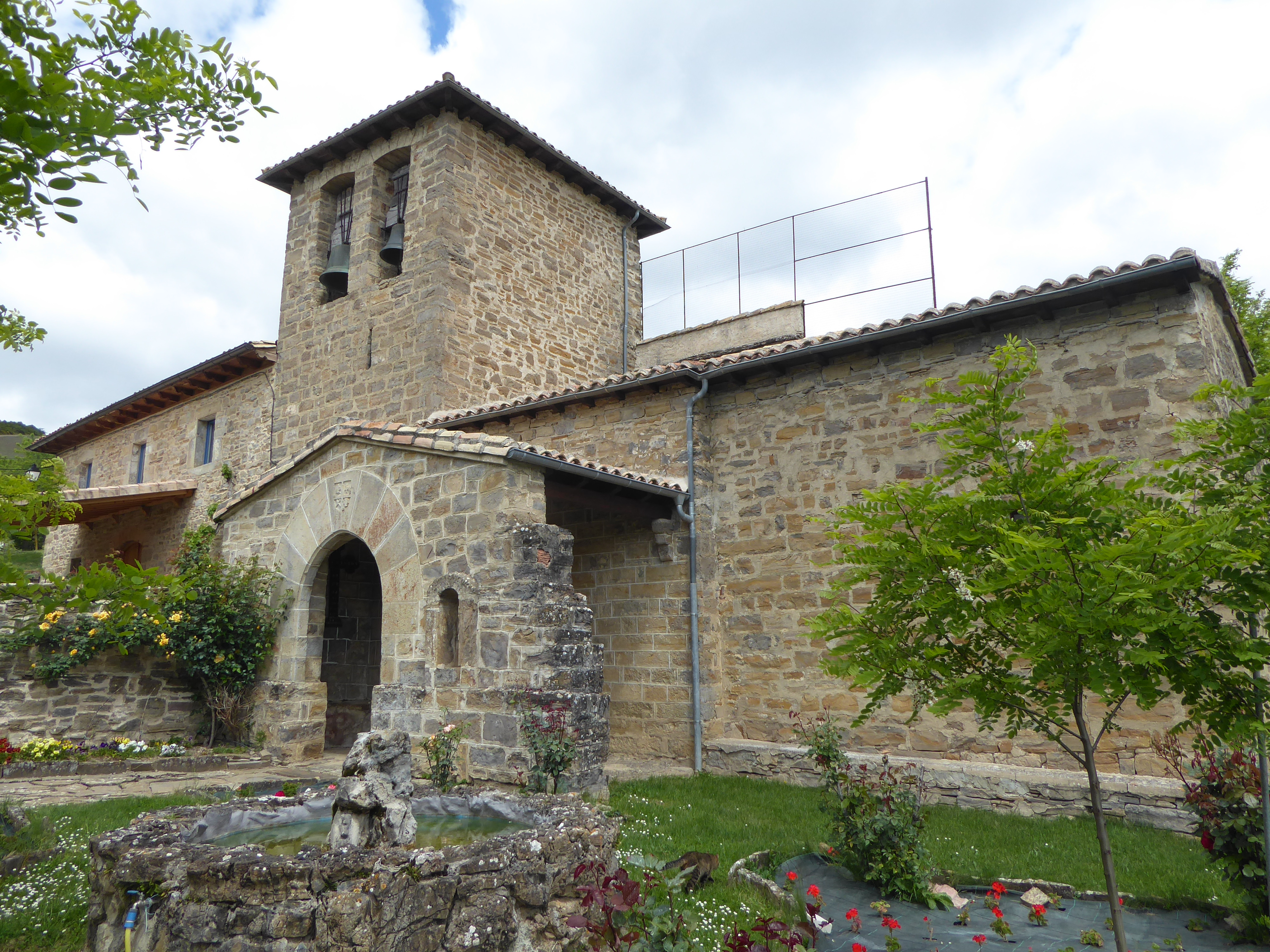
Eparotz in Urraúl Alto

Urraúl Alto (Basque: Urraulgoiti) is a town and municipality located in the province and autonomous community of Navarre, northern Spain.
