= Aizkolaritza =

Basque wood-chopping competition

Aizkolaritza [ais̻ˈkolaɾiˌts̻a] is a Basque wood-chopping competition. They are a popular form of herri kirol (rural sport) in the Basque Country. Competitions are commonly held at most festivals, especially town festivals and usually involve at least two individuals or teams competing against each other.

== The name ==
The sport is called aizkolaritza in Basque, from aizkolari 'wood-chopper' plus the noun-forming suffix -tza. It is also known as aizkol jokoa, the 'axe game'. Spanish uses a loanword from Basque, aizcolari and in French the sport is called coupeurs de bûches.

== Rules ==
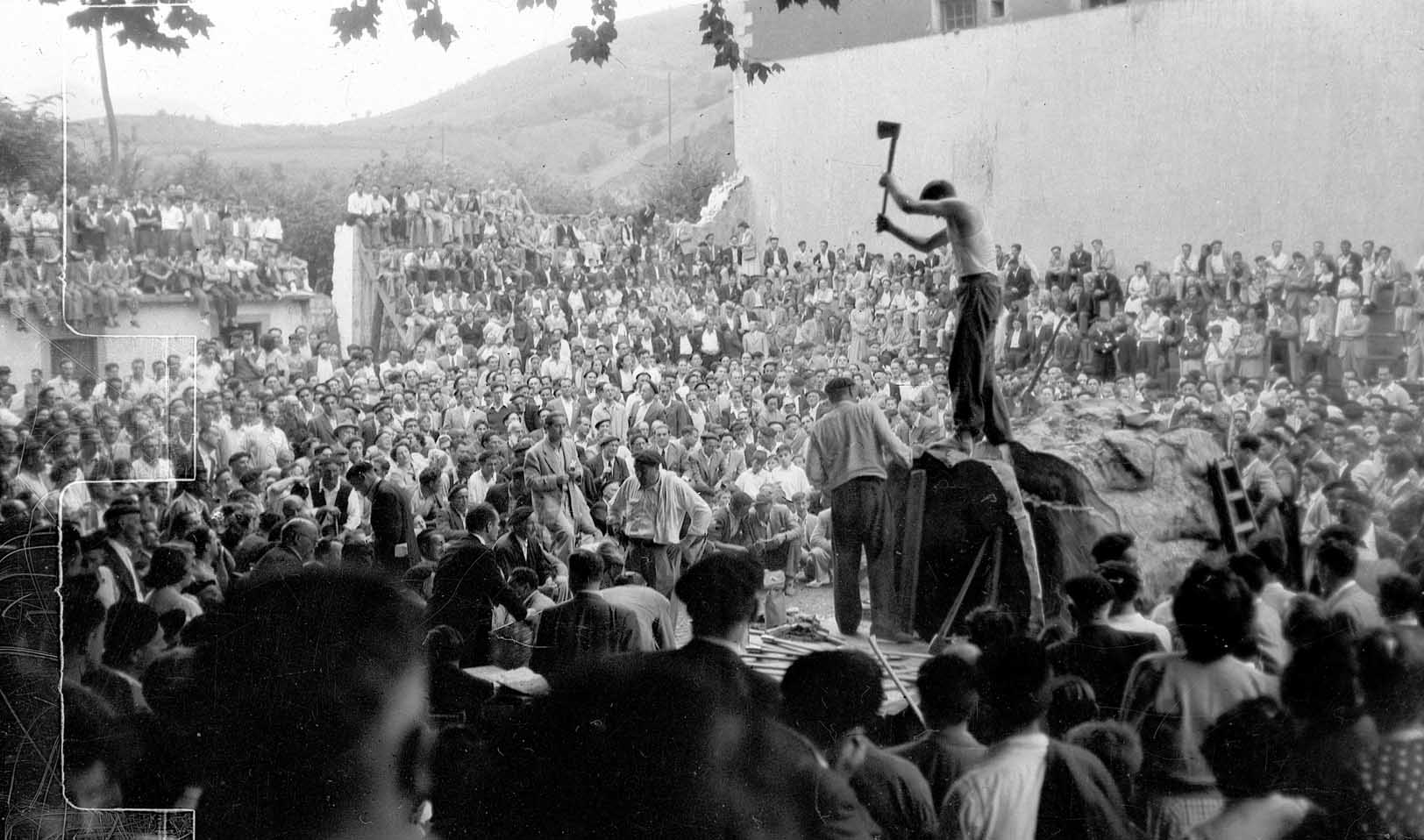
Luxia chopping a trunk with a 2.10m diameter in 1949

The sections of trunk are usually beech without visible knots from the forests of Navarre. For competitions, the trunk sections closest to the roots or branches are used as they are of less value to the wood industry. The trunks are categorised according to their circumference using Basque inches (ontza), equivalent to 0.0254m. They commonly are used in the following sizes:

Ontza	Basque name	translation
36	oinbetekoa	one of a full foot
45		
54	kanaerdikoa	one of half a kana
60		
72	oinbikoa	one of two feet
80		
108	kanakoa	one of one kana
110		

The oinbetekoa, 80 ontza, kanakoa and bigger ones are often used in wagers; the kanaerdikoa, 60 ontza and oinbikoa most commonly in bigger competitions and arranged in a row, each nailed to planks for stability.

The axes are between 2.4 and 2.8 kg heavy with a rounded blade and each aizkolari uses a number of them in a competition. The logs are between 0.5-0.8m long for competitions where one aizkolari stands on the log and between 0.8-1.2m long for competitions where two stand on it.

== Competitions ==
The competitions are usually a race for the finish by however many individual competitors there are but occasionally they are done txandetan, in relays, where two aizkolaris form a team and relieve the other once a trunk has been chopped through. The focus is more on stamina than speed compared to other wood-chopping events outside the Basque Country and most competitions last half an hour at the very least but normally more than an hour.

They can be held with each aizkolari having two helpers. The botilero (botillero in Spanish) holds the towel and brings new axes. The prestatzaile (enseñador in Spanish) checks the two halves are fully separated (they sometimes appear to have but are still connected), dictates the rhythm and indicates where best to hit next.

In a famous competition held in 1983 in Tolosa, two aizkolaris called Jose Mari Mendizabal and Mikel Mindegi had a wager to chop six 110 ontza trunks and 52 kanaerdikoa (a total of 100 kanaerdi) each in less than 5 hours. Mendizabal won the competition and 2 million pesetas taking just 4:12hrs, Mindegi 4:29hrs. But the most famous aizkolari was probably a man nicknamed Santa Ageda who competed in an epic event in the bullring of Azpeitia in 1903.

Many aizkolariak compete into high age. In 1900, Augustin Unanue who was aged 75 at the time, famously chopped a log of 1m diameter in 4 hours. Famous competitions often lead to the composition of bertsos in honour of the event.

The most important modern day competition is probably the Urrezko Aizkora, the "golden axe" competition where the best aizkolaris from all over the Basque Country compete against each other individually or in pairs. There are several categories, including two junior competitions for people under the age of 23 and 18. The competitions are held in different places in the Basque Country over a period of two months to establish a winner. Held since 1997, it has been held annually since. Other important competitions are the Donostiako Urrezko Kopako ("gold cup of San Sebastián"), the Euskal Herriko Lehen Maila ("premier league of the Basque Country") and the provincial competitions.

=== Over-regional championships ===
==== Urrezko Aizkora ====
An annual event with the final taking place in Azpeitia. The winner or winning pair in the adult categories are given in bold.

Year	Singles	Pairs
1997		
1998	**Joxemiel Peñagarikano**	
1999		
2000		
2001		**Floren Nazabal & Joxemiel Peñagarikano**
2002		**Anjel Arrospidek & Xabier Orbegozo (Arria V) (19:12)**; Floren Nazabal & López Azpilikueta (20:07)
2003	**Donato Larretxea** v Jose Mari Olasagasti	**Mindegia & Donato Larretxea (16:29)**; Floren Nazabal & Jose Mari Olasagasti (16:49); Joxemiel Peñagarikano & Anjel Arrospide (16:31)
2004	**Floren Nazabal**	**Mindegia & Donato Larretxea**
2005	**Donato Larretxea** v Floren Nazabal	
2006	**Floren Nazabal** v Jose Mari Olasagasti	
2007	**Floren Nazabal** v Jose Mari Olasagasti	Floren Nazabal & Juan Jose Azpilikueta; Donato Larretxea & Jose Juan Barberena
2008	**Floren Nazabal** v Donato Larretxea	**Donato Larretxea & Aitzol Atutxa (30:37)**; Anjel Arrospide & Aierbe II (32:38)
2009		

==== Euskal Herriko Txapelketa ====
The championship of the Basque Country where aizkolaris from all over the Basque Country compete.

Year	Winner	Runner-up
1989		
1990		
1991		
1992		
1993		
1994		
1995		
1996	Jose Mari Olasagasti	
1997	Donato Larretxea	
1998	Jose Mari Olasagasti	
1999	Jose Mari Olasagasti	
2000	Joxemiel Peñagarikano	
2001	Jose Mari Olasagasti	
2002		
2003	Donato Larretxea	
2004		
2005	Mikel Mujika	
2006		
2007		
2008		
2009		

=== Provincial championships ===
==== Bizkaiko Irekia ====
The "open championship of Biscay".

==== Gipuzkoako Txapelketa ====
The championship of Gipuzkoa, a province level championship held annually.

Year	Winner	Runner-up
1997	**Joxemiel Peñagarikano**	
1998	**Jonatán Archie**	
1999		
2000		
2001		
2002		
2003	**Iñaki Azurmendi**	
2004		
2005		
2006		
2007		
2008	**Iñaki Azurmendi (33:19)**	Joxemari Olasagasti (34:35)
2009		

==== Nafarroako Txapelketa ====
The championship of Navarre, a province level championship held annually.

Year	Winner	Runner-up
2008		
2009		

=== Other championships ===
==== Donostiako Urrezko Kopa ====
The "golden cup of San Sebastián", held annually with 5 finalists competing in the final event. To date, the best time is held by Donato Larretxea who completed the task in a record 25 minutes 17 seconds.

Year	Winner	Runner-up
1989	**Donato Larretxea** (35:09)	
1990	**Joxemari Olasagasti** (31:41)	
1991	**Anjel Arrospide** (28:20)	
1992	**Anjel Arrospide** (27:39)	
1993	**Anjel Arrospide** (27:53)	
1994	**Anjel Arrospide** (28:34)	
1995	**Donato Larretxea** (27:17)	
1996	**Anjel Arrospide** (29:11)	
1997	**Donato Larretxea** (29:22)	
1998	**Antonio Senosiain** (30:00)	
1999	**Joxemari Olasagasti** (27:39)	Joxemiel Peñagarikano (30:08)
2000	**Joxemiel Peñagarikano** (29:04)	Floren Nazabal (30:53)
2001	**Joxemiel Peñagarikano** (27:34)	Donato Larretxea (27:56)
2002	**Donato Larretxea** (29:03)	Joxemiel Peñagarikano (31:10)
2003	**Joxemiel Peñagarikano** (37:01)	Floren Nazabal (37:23)
2004	**Floren Nazabal** (35:28)	Joxemiel Peñagarikano (36:12)
2005	**Floren Nazabal** (38:52)	Joxemari Olasagasti (41:48)
2006	**Floren Nazabal** (31:47)	Joxemari Olasagasti (36:16)
2007	**Joxemari Olasagasti** (31:34)	Luis Txapartegi (32:57)
2008		
2009		

== Variations ==
Normally the aizkolaris stand on the trunk sections but there are variations where they are required to chop a vertical tree from the top called zutiko enborra or "upright trunk". This is achieved by chopping notches into the trunk into which the aizkolari inserts a plank. He then stands on the plank to reach higher up, working his way around the trunk in a spiral until he can chop the top section. The trunks are up to 6m tall and usually no safety equipment is used up to that height.

There is another variation combining the chopping competition with a race.

== Women and aizkolaritza ==
Traditionally a male dominated sport, women have begun to take part in aizkolari competitions in recent years as they have in other traditional Basque sports, for example Itziar Goenaga, Kristina Saralegi and Lucia Unceta

== History ==
Wood-chopping as a profession has a long tradition in the Basque Country and has been recorded since medieval times when the profession was important to the local shipbuilding and charcoal burning industry which later also fed the metal-working industry. This work was carried out by small, itinerant groups of men living in the woods, the youngest and strongest usually felling the trees and the older preparing the felled trees and building the txondorra, the mound for burning charcoal. In these communities, competitions were common to establish who the strongest and fastest aizkolariak were.

The use of large quantities of charcoal as fuel for the many foundries in the Basque Country in the 18th century together with the use of wood for shipbuilding led to large areas of woodland being cut down. In time, those country towns and valleys that were famed for their top wood-cutters turned out to be those that have safeguarded the wealth of their forests.

As popular competitions they were not recorded until the 19th century. The names of the competitors were not recorded but referred to by their place of origin or group, for example "one of Beizama", "the son of the house of Gorrizu", "the group from Nuarbe" or "the one from Beunza farm". To outsiders, the early competitions were known as fiestas Euskaras "Basque fiestas".

== See also ==
- Basque rural sports
