= Kristina Saralegi =

Spanish farmer and entrepreneur (1974–2022)

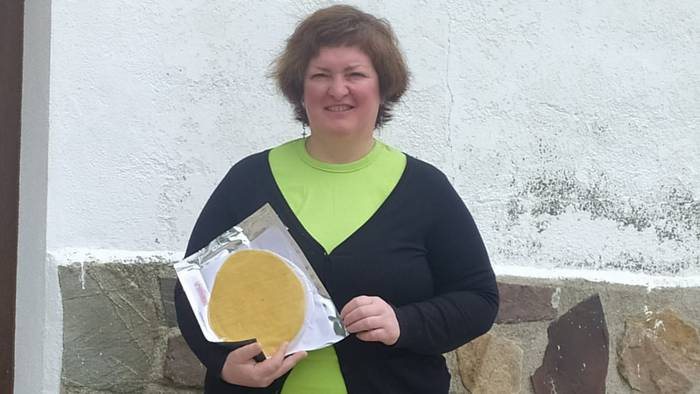
Kristina Saralegi

Kristina Saralegi Arribillaga (7 May 1974 – 26 February 2022) was a Spanish farmer, rancher, and Talo maker. She had a long entrepreneurship career in agricultural and livestock farming in rural areas particularly in the valleys of Navarre.

== Biography ==
Born on 7 May 1974 in the Arro farm in Leitza, northern Spain, Kristina Saralegi was the daughter of Miguel Saralegi and his wife Vitori Arribillaga. Her brother, who picked up a stone weighing 329 kilos in 2001, was involved in farming and traditional sports activities. After completing her studies, Saralegi chose to follow in the footsteps of her father. At the age of 14, she began going with her mother to prepare Talos on Saint Thomas' day in Donostia. She spent most of her life in the Arro de Leitza hamlet by engaging herself in farming activities.

She was a Basque native and participated in a number of Basque rural sports competitions including the Aizkolaritza, a traditionally male dominated woodchopping event. She regularly appeared in radio and television programs. She exhibited her food products during different workshops and food competitions. She also introduced a new brand of Talo food named, Saralegi Taloak.

Saralegi married Joxe Manuel Huici, a native of Goizueta, Navarre.

She died on 26 February 2022 in Leitza of breast cancer.
