= Basque rural sports =

Sports competitions of the Basque people

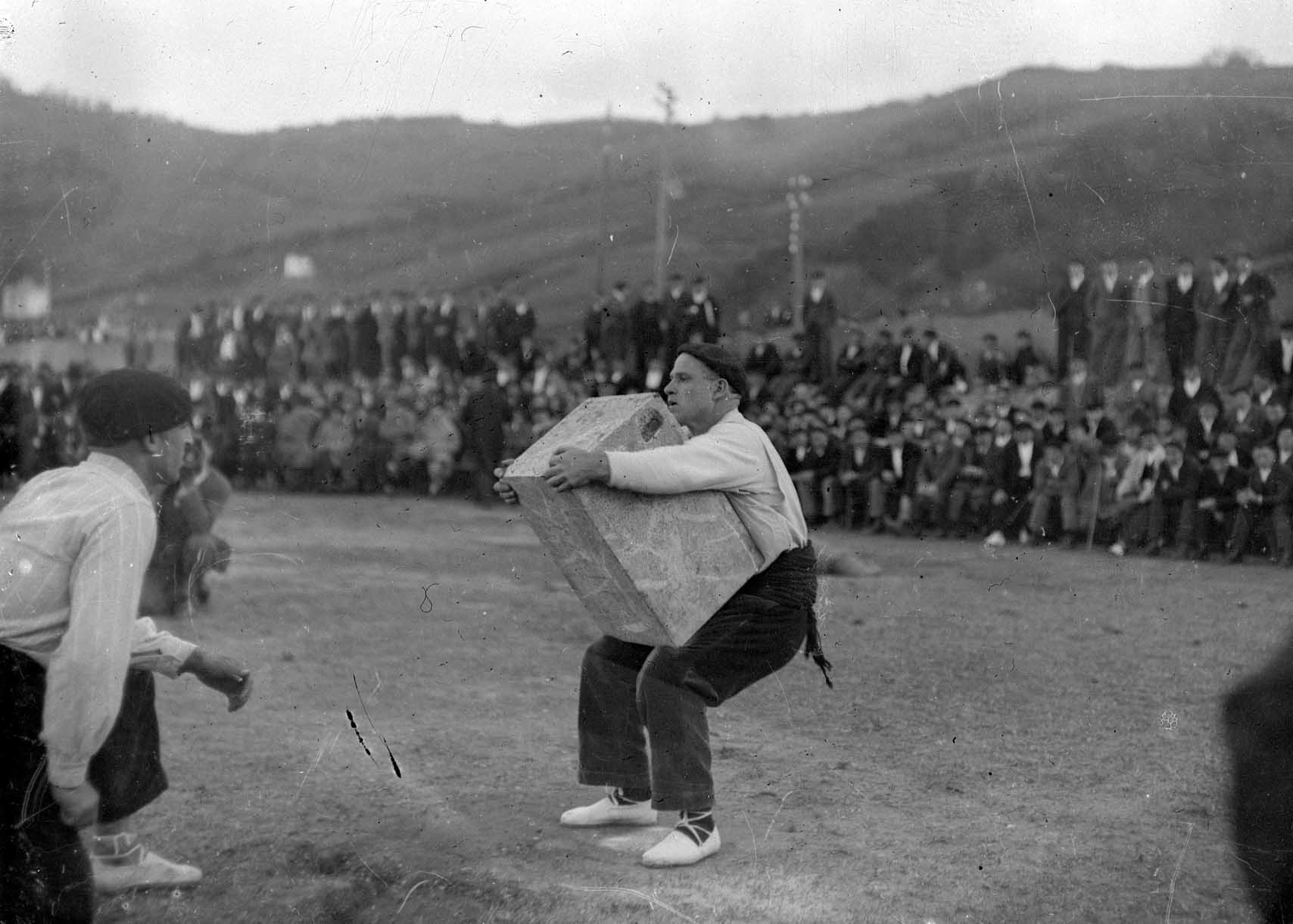
Arteondo, a harri-jasotzaile, lifting a 15 arro stone in Deba in 1924

Basque rural sports, known as Deportes Rurales in Spanish or Herri Kirolak in Basque, is the term used for a number of sports competitions rooted in the traditional lifestyles of the Basque people. The term force basque is used in French.

Virtually all regional Basque rural sports have their origin in the two main historical occupations, the baserritarra (farmer) and arrantzalea (fisher), with a larger percentage hailing from the rural background. The sociological changes in the Basque Country have led many of these becoming technically obsolete in the 19th and 20th century. Few continue to exist as rural or marine activities connected to everyday life and have become rare, but many have managed to transform themselves into popular sports instead, some of which have become extremely popular.

Winners receive a Basque beret (boina or txapela) as a trophy, hence the Basque word for "champion" - txapeldun, literally "one who has a beret".

Betting, both by the competitors and the audience, is very common and popular at such sporting events in the north of Spain.

== The H18K rural sports ==
In 2006, the Basque Government identified 18 particular rural sports, called H18K, in its Strategic Plan for promotion. These 18 categories are (in alphabetical order):

=== Aizkora proba (wood chopping) ===
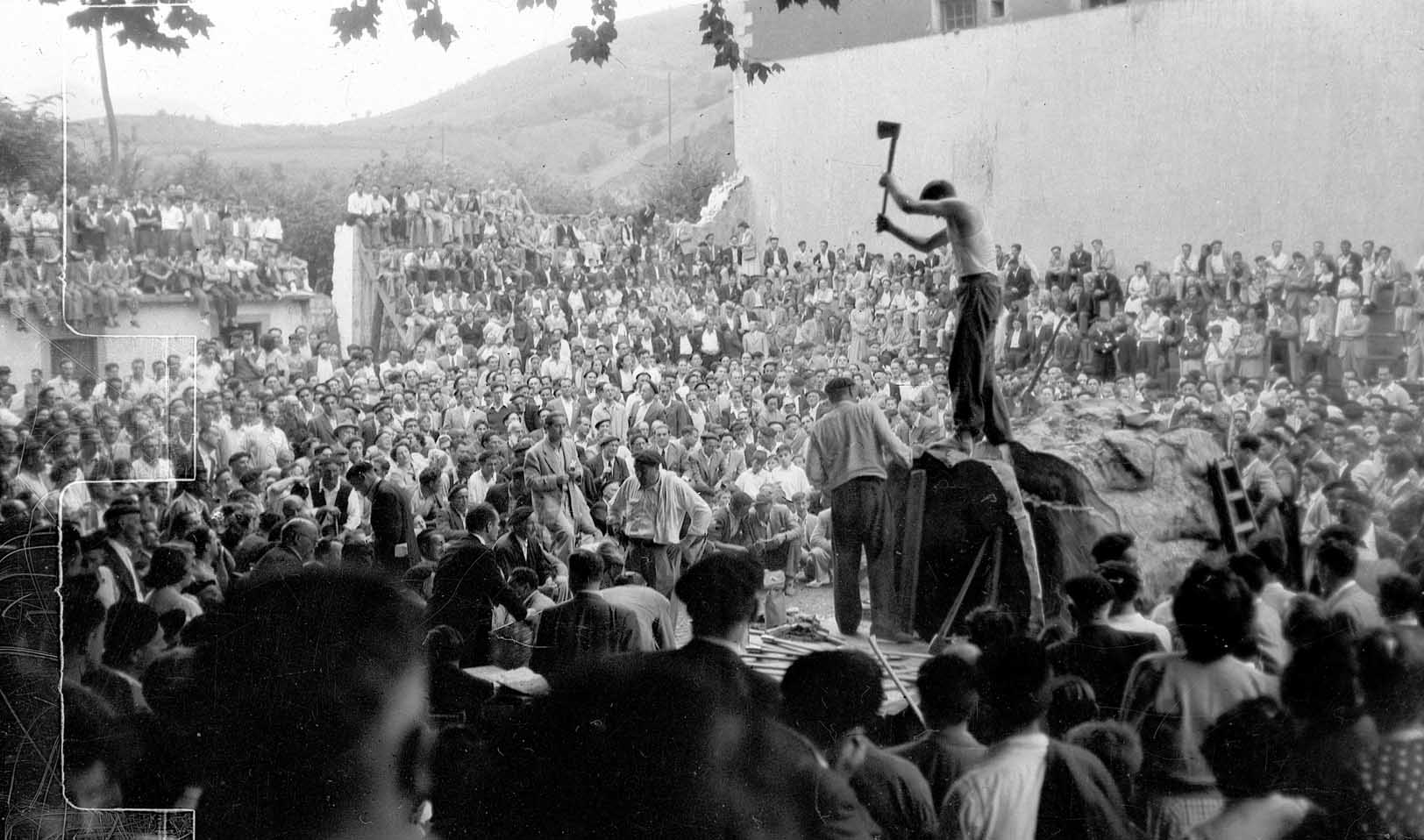
Luxia chopping a trunk with a 2.10m diameter in 1949

Literally "axe test", this rural sport more commonly known as aizkolaritza, from the Basque word for a wood-cutter. A very popular sport today, its origins are in the rural wood cutting and charcoal burning communities of earlier periods.

In this competition, the wood cutter has to chop through a number of tree trunks arranged on the ground in rows as quickly as possible while standing on the log to beat his competitors.

This sport is often seen in summer at local festivities and open-air dances, held in towns all over the country.

=== Giza-abere probak (dragging games) ===
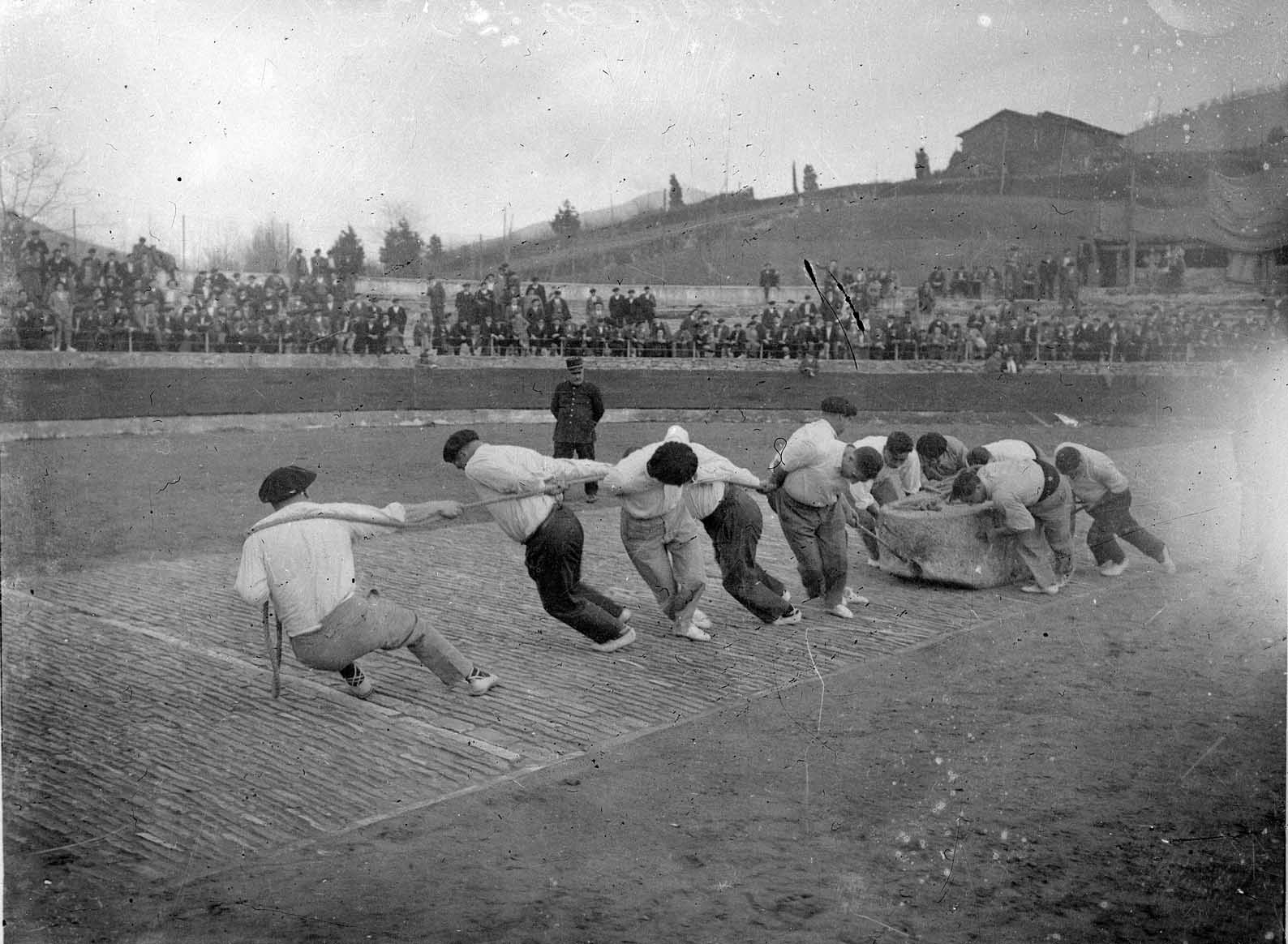
11 people dragging a 4,000 kg (8,800 lb) stone in Eibar in 1940

This sport translates as Human-animal tests and is a collective term for a number of sports in which humans and animals are involved in dragging heavy weights. There are four main categories:

- Giza probak (human tests) where people attempt to drag a heavy weight, usually a large rock, across a certain distance
- Zaldi probak (horse tests) - same as giza probak but with horses
- Idi probak (oxen tests) - same as giza probak but with oxen
- Asto probak (donkey tests) - same as giza probak but with donkeys

These normally take place on specially built trial grounds. The aim is to cover a certain distance within a given time or to cover as many circuits as possible. The idi probak are by far the most popular in this category.

=== Harri-jasotzaileak (stone lifting) ===
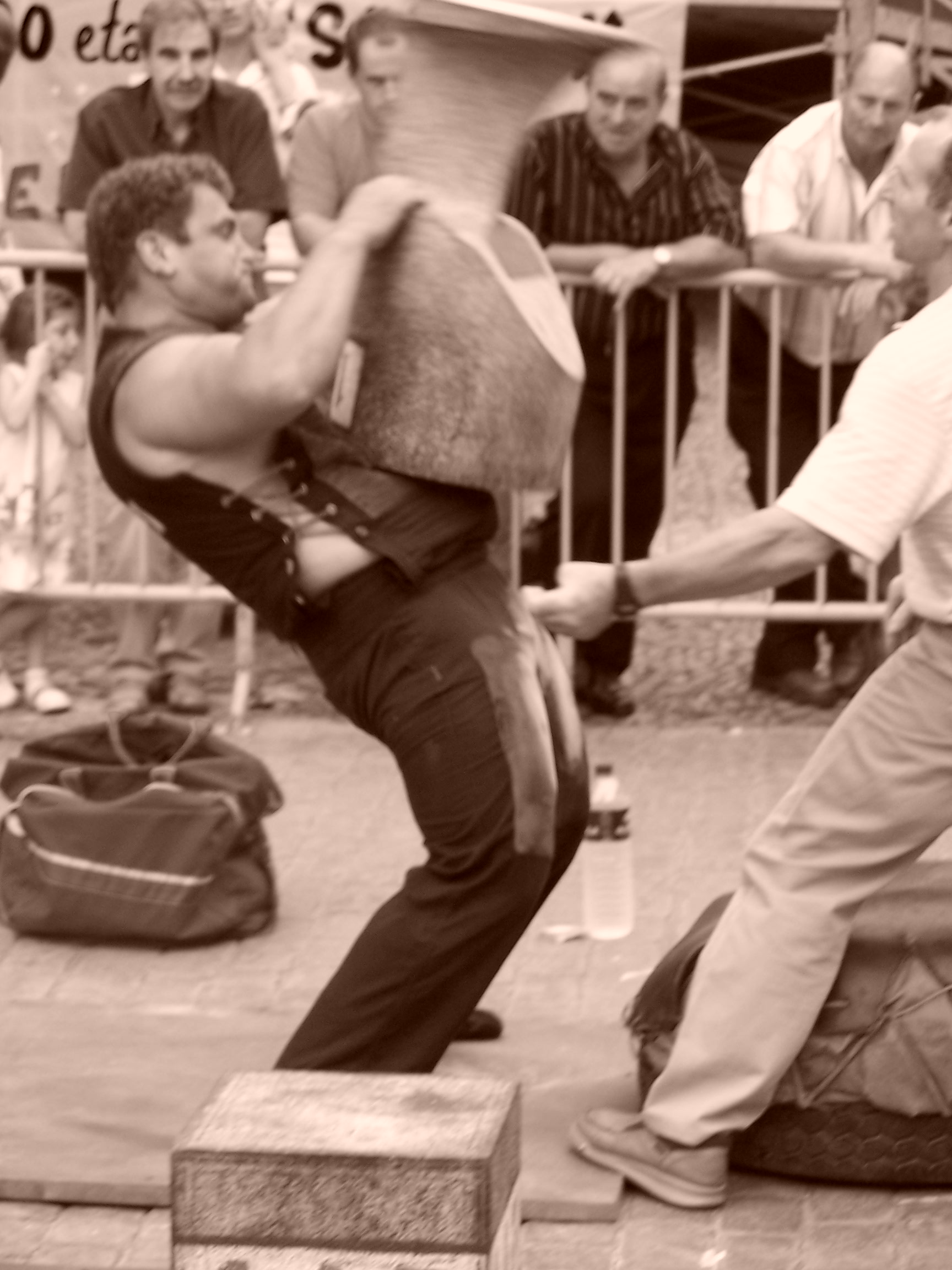
A harri-jasotzaile lifting the stone.

The lifting of stones is one of the most widely known Basque rural sports outside the Basque Country, largely thanks to the prowess of Iñaki Perurena, a harrijasotzaile (stone-lifter) from Leitza, in Navarre, the first on record to lift stone over 300 kg (660 lb).

There are usually two stone-lifters competing in each event, taking turns in one or several attempts, to perform the greatest possible number of lifts. A lift is considered complete when the stone has been properly balanced on the shoulder.

The four types of stone most frequently used are rectangular, cylindrical, spherical and square and were established at the beginning of the 20th century. The stones are traditionally made of granite, their weight normally ranging from 100 to 212 kg (220 to 467 lb).

Together with aizkolaritza (wood chopping), stone lifting is another example a widely performed rural sport at local festivities all over the Basque Country.

=== Harri-zulaketa (hole drilling) ===
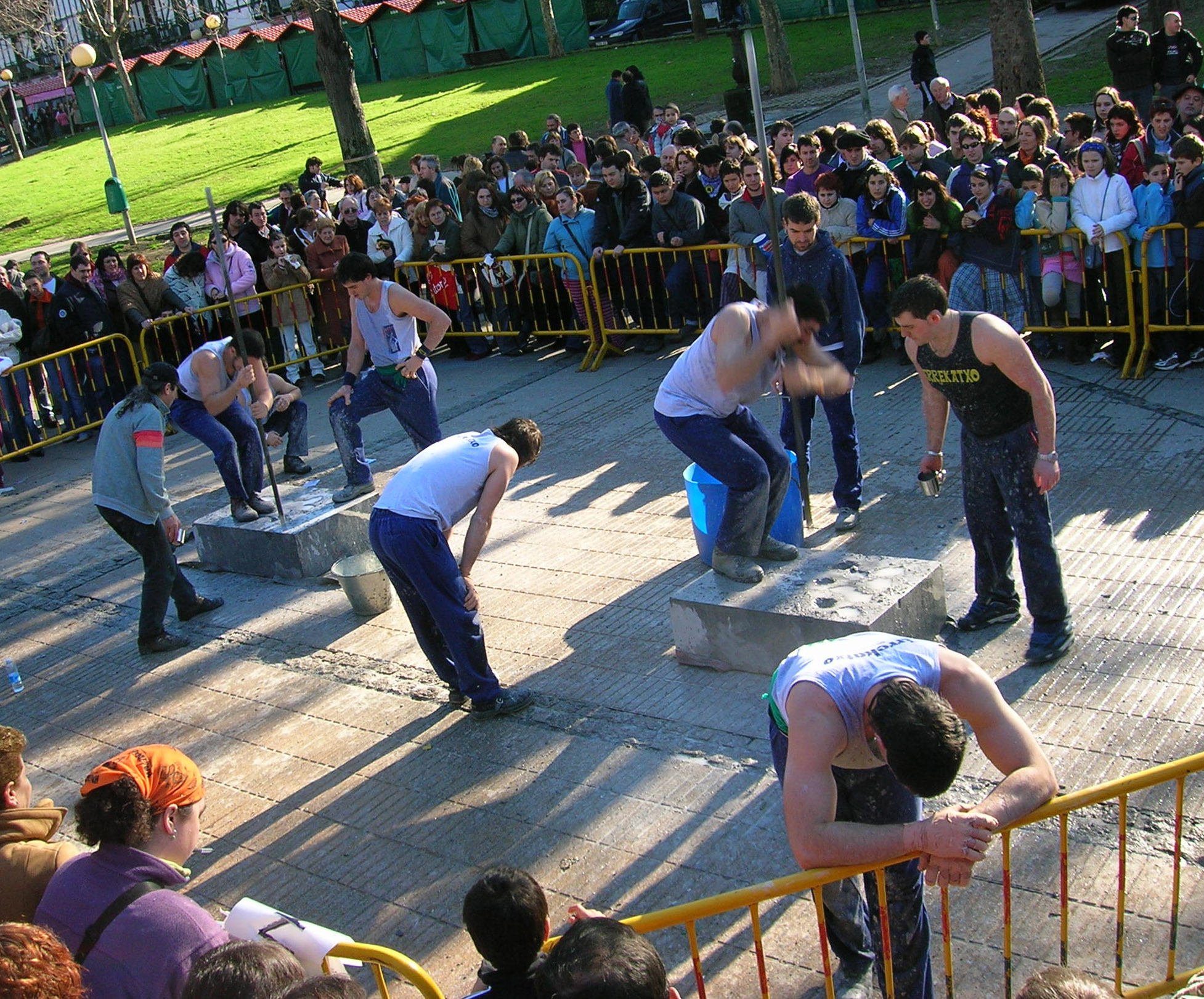
Harri-zulaketa competition

The hole drilling competition involves having to grind holes into a rock. Teams of three compete against each other. They take turns in using a long metal pole (called laztabin) to punch and drill a hole into a large rock upon which they are standing, pouring water onto the working area while the third person gets to rest.

This tradition goes back to the quarrying activities around the Basque Country, in particular in Biscay. In Spanish it is called barrenadores "drillers" and occasionally barrenatzaileak (drillers, from the Spanish word) in Basque as well.

=== Ingude altxatzea (anvil lifting) ===
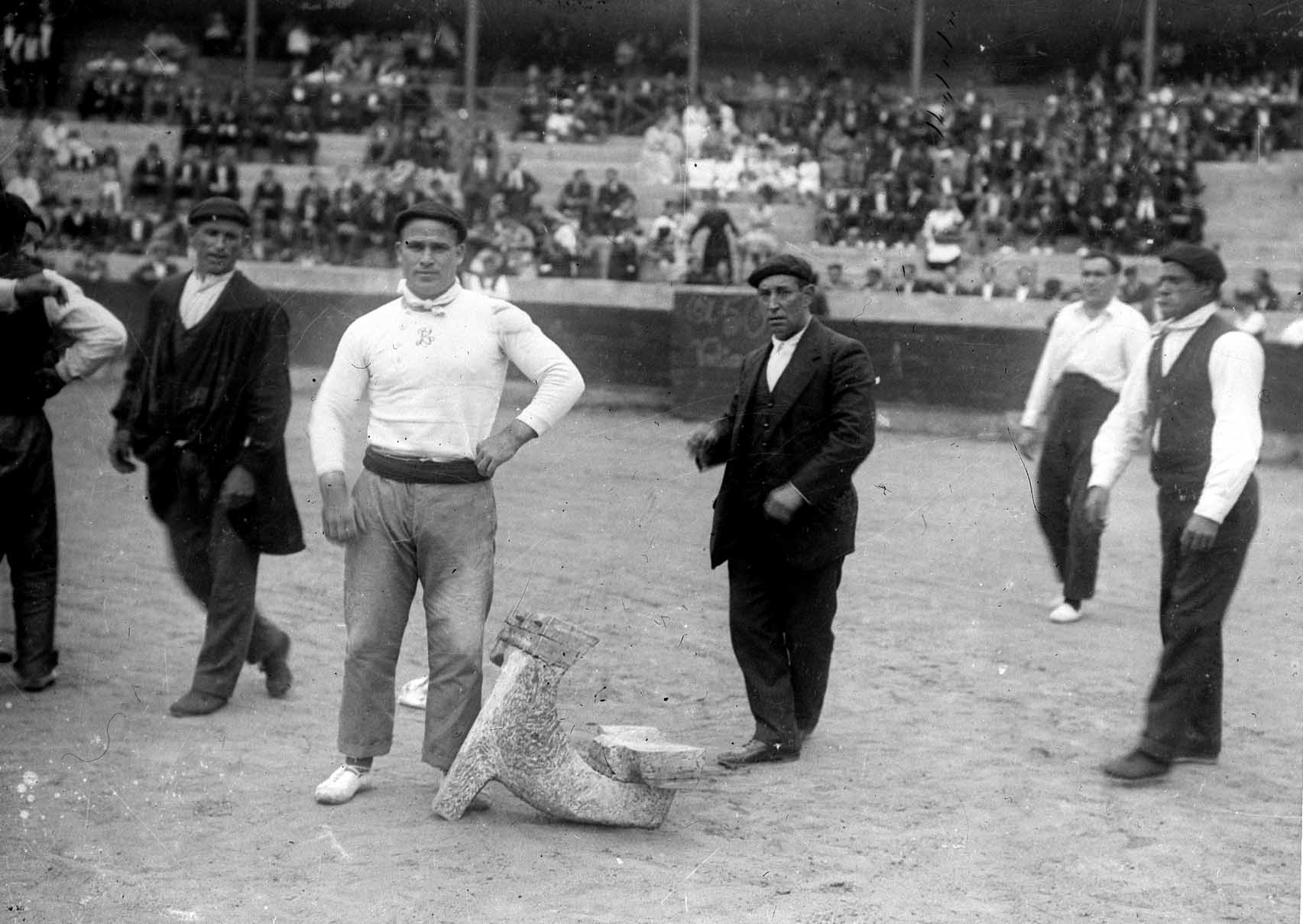
Bittor Zabala in an anvil lifting competition in Eibar in 1928

The lifting of anvils requires competitors to lift an iron anvil or ingude weighing 18 kg (40 lb), 30 cm (12 in) above the height of their own head, as many times as possible in a set time period. The anvil has the shape of an obtuse triangle with a stump at one point or an elongated T and is traditionally used in shoeing horses. Champions manage some 80 lifts in 2 minutes.

In Spanish this is called alzamiento de yunque and in French lever d'enclume.

=== Lasto altxatzea (bale lifting) ===
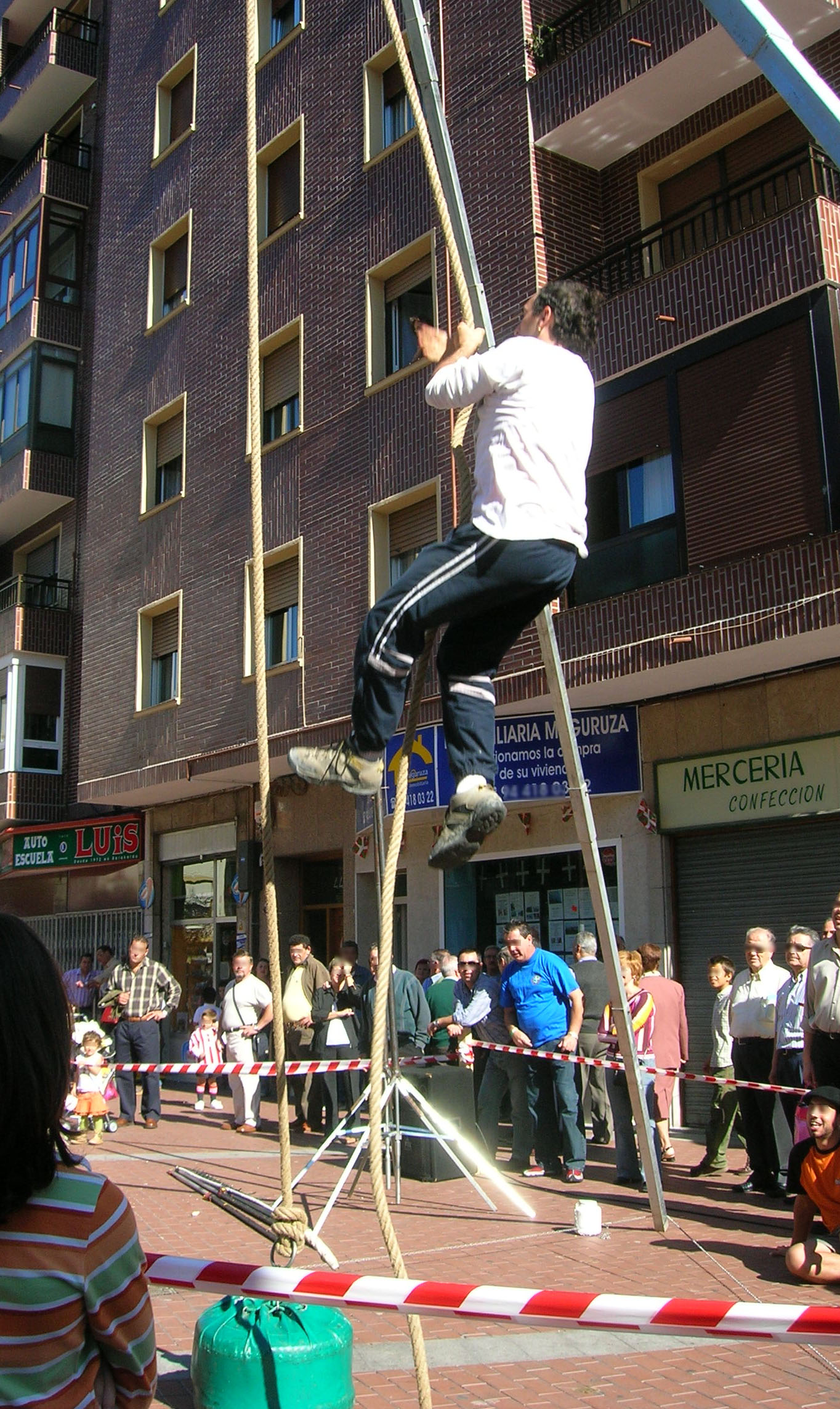
Hay-bale lifting

Literally hay bale lifting, this sport involves raising a hay-bale with the aid of a pulley.

The competition is usually about lifting the bale as often as possible within a given period of time, most commonly 2 minutes. The bale weighs 45 kg (99 lb) in the men's competitions and 30 kg (66 lb) in the women's competition.

The most difficult part is to get the bale to the required height for the first time. Once that has been achieved, the competitors allow the bale to drop in free fall, grabbing the rope and jumping up at the appropriate moment to use their own body weight to lift the bale again when coming down. A lot of skill is needed to avoid rope burn. The visual appearance is not dissimilar to swinging on a church bell rope.

In Spanish this is called levantamiento de fardo and in French lever de paille.

=== Lasto botatzea (bale tossing) ===
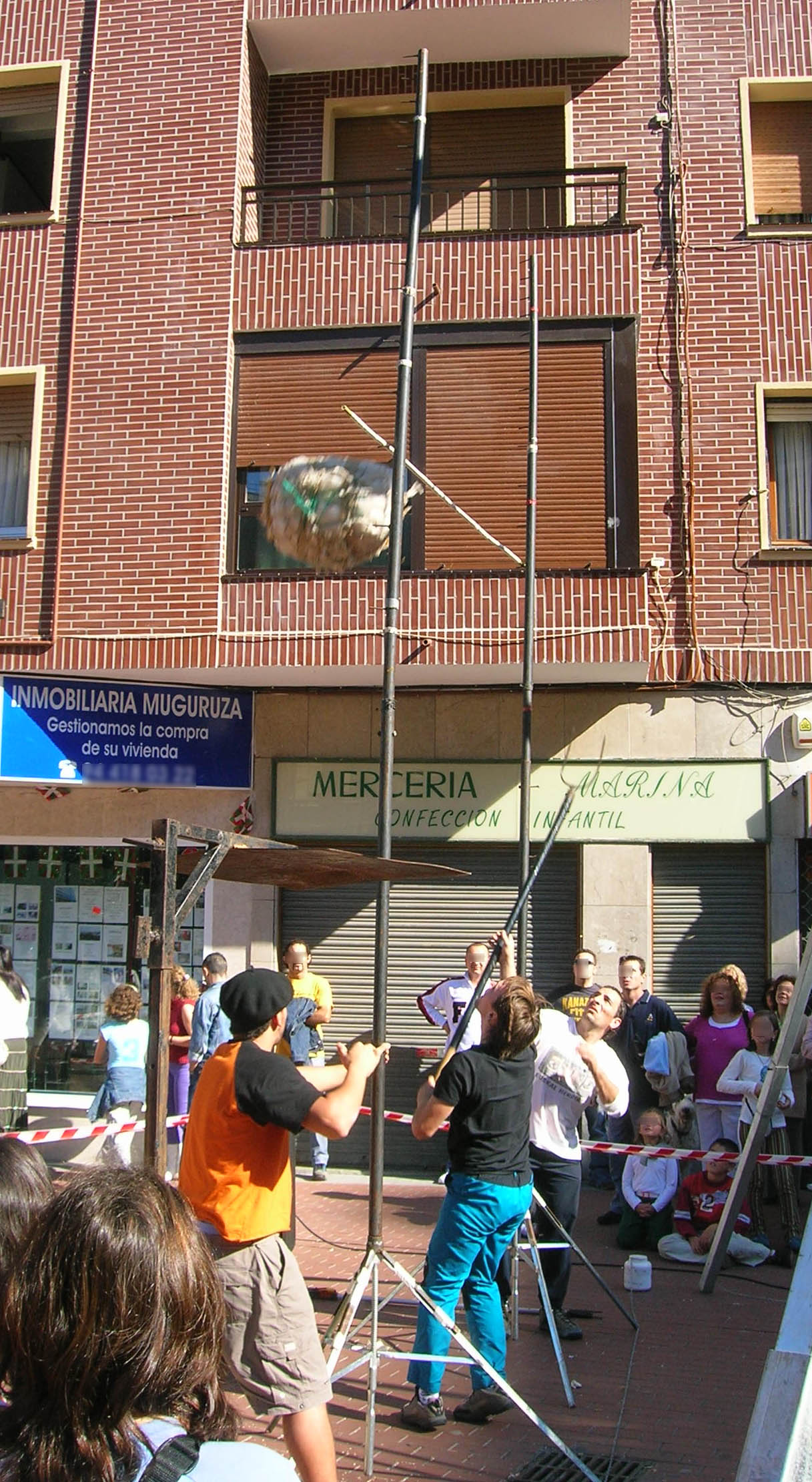
Hay bale tossing in Barakaldo

Hay bale tossing is related to lasto altxatzea. Here the hay-bales have to be thrown over a bar set a certain height with the help of a pitchfork. For men the height is normally 7 m (23 ft) and for women 5 m (16 ft), the bale has to hit a bell for the toss to be valid.

This sport is very similar to the Scottish sheaf toss. In Spanish this is called lanzamiento de fardo.

=== Lokotx biltzea (cob gathering) ===
In cob gathering competitions, also called buskail biltzea, cobs are placed at 1.25 m (4 ft 1 in) distances in a line, 25 in a line at the most. The game can be played to 50, 75, or 100 cobs in which case they are placed in sets of 2, 3, or 4. The competitors have to collect these in order (the nearest first) and place them into a basket at one end of the row of cobs.

It is called recogida de mazorcas in Spanish and course des épis de maïs in French.

=== Ontzi eramatea (churn carrying) ===
The churn carrying competition usually involves milk churns and is very similar to the txinga eramatea competition. Competitors have to carry a 41 kg (90 lb) churn in each hand as far as possible. This game is also called esneketariak "milk carrying" or ontziketariak "can carrying".

=== Orga jokoa (cart game) ===
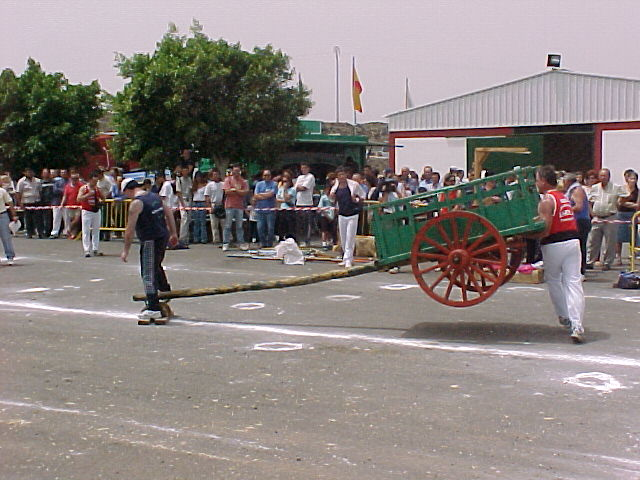
Orga joko

The "oxcart game" is a display of strength. Contestants have to lift the back of an ox cart, usually weighing around 360 kg (790 lb), and the end usually at around 40 cm (16 in) above the ground. The cart is pivoted to the ground at the front end and competitors must rotate it, trying to go around as many times as possible in a sideways motion.

It is also called andartza in Basque. In Spanish this is called levantamiento de carro and in French lever de charette.

It was the inspiration behind the creation of Strongman event 'Basque Circle' as seen in 1989 World's Strongest Man competition, as well as the Conan's wheel event which is a slight modification, where the athletes walk a frontward motion around the circle rather than sideways.

=== Sega jokoa (scything) ===
Literally "scythe game", this sport is also known as segalariak (scythers), sega proba (scythe test), sega apustua (scythe bet) or segalaritza (scything). The earliest record of this sport comes from a bertso dating back to 1880 about a competition in Iturriotz.

In this sport competitors (called segalari) either compete to cut the most grass in a given period of time (usually one hour) or they are each given plots of grass of the same size and the competition is to see who can scythe theirs the fastest. Today the competition usually lasts one hour but two-hour competitions also are still held. At the end, the grass is raked, weighed and baled to establish the winner. Traditionally, as with most Basque sports, the competitors would make a profit by betting but monetary prizes have been put up since the 1950s.

There are few actual records in this sport as it very much depends on the terrain and is thus difficult to compare. But a number of segalari have achieved fame nonetheless, for example the legendary Pedro Maria Otaño Ezeitza, commonly known as Santa Ageda from Beizama who was also an aizkolari and competed up until 1915. Another famed event was the competition of 1925 in Iturriotz when, before a crowd of 6,000, Pedro Mendizabal from Aia and Jose Arrieta from Urnieta battled each other. Legend has it that more than 150,000 pesetas in bets were placed. Mendizabal won, cutting 4,294 kg (9,467 lb) of grass in two hours against his rival's 3,957 kg (8,724 lb).

The use of scythes is still widespread today as many pastures are too steep for modern farm machinery so scythes are used to cut grass or bracken. Working scythes have blades between 0.9 and 0.95 m (2 ft 11 in and 3 ft 1 in) in length, but competition scythes range from 1.18 to 1.24 m (3 ft 10 in to 4 ft 1 in) in length. A decent segalari can manage some 5,000 m^{2} (54,000 sq ft)^{2} in a day.

In Spanish this is simply called siega.

=== Sokatira (tug-of-war) ===
Tug-of-war is also traditional in the Basque Country. Usually two teams of eight compete, trying to drag the other team over a line by pulling on the rope.

There are free competitions in which the weight of the competitors is ignored and more structured events where there are weight categories of 525 kg (1,157 lb), 560 kg (1,230 lb), 640 kg (1,410 lb), and 720 kg (1,590 lb) per team. Juvenile teams are always under 560 kg (1,230 lb). Three lines are marked on the ground, a middle line and parallel to that at 2 m (6 ft 7 in) distance two more. The maximum length of the rope is 32 m (105 ft) with a circumference between 10 and 12.5 cm (3.9 and 4.9 in). There are 5 markers on the rope, a red marker in the middle, 2 m (6 ft 7 in) away from the red marker on either side are white markers and 5 m (16 ft) on either side of those are blue markers. The aim is for a team to get the opposing team's blue marker over the team's own 2 m (6 ft 7 in) line. Hands must always be on the rope and it may not be supported with any other part of the body or allowed to slacken. Only the last member of the team is allowed to wind the rope around their body.

In Spanish this is called sogatira and in French tir à la corde.

=== Trontza (sawing) ===
Sawing competitions, also called trontzalaritza or arpana, are seen as a variation of aizkolaritza and involve sawing through pieces of wood. The log is either fixed horizontally on sawhorses at a height of 40 cm (16 in) or at an angle with one end over the sawhorse and two members of the sawing team sitting on the lower end to stabilise the log, with two other handling the saw. The saw is usually 2 m (6 ft 7 in) long, the logs vary but can be over 1 m (3 ft 3 in) in circumference and usually between 10 and 20 in number.

In Spanish this is called corte de troncos con tronza or just tronza and in French scieur de bois.

=== Txinga eramatea (weight carrying) ===
In the weight carrying competition weights have to be carried in both hands as far as possible. There usually is no time limit but the weights weigh between 50 and 100 kg (110 and 220 lb) each and may not be put down or supported by any other part of the body. Competitors may hold them only by the rope handles and are not allowed to put their hands through the handles. It is possible for competitors to bring their own, favourite weights, but they are checked by judges beforehand. The aim is to complete as many plaza of 28 m (92 ft) as possible. Competitors each set their own pace and may stop (without putting the weights down). Champions typically manage 400 to 500 m (1,300 to 1,600 ft). It is similar to the churn carrying competition.

The word eramatea variously shows up in dialect forms such as erutea or eroatea. In Spanish this is called prueba de txingas or carreras marmitas.

=== Zaku eramatea (sack carrying) ===
The sack carrying, also called zaku lasterketa (sack race) requires participants to have both speed and stamina. It usually takes the form of a relay race in teams of 3 where the runners have to carry heavy sacks across their shoulders. Depending on the area, the sacks contain a variety of things from bread to beans and usually weigh 60 kg (130 lb), 75 kg (165 lb), or 80 kg (180 lb).

In Spanish this is called carreras de contrabandistas ("smugglers' runs") or carrera con saco and in French course de sac.

== Other rural sports ==
The above categories included in the H18K group aside, there are a number of other rural and traditional Basque sports, some of which are extremely popular both in and outside the Basque Country. Some are indigenous, some also occur in areas adjacent to the Basque country or other cultures around the world.

=== Ahari topeka (ram fighting) ===
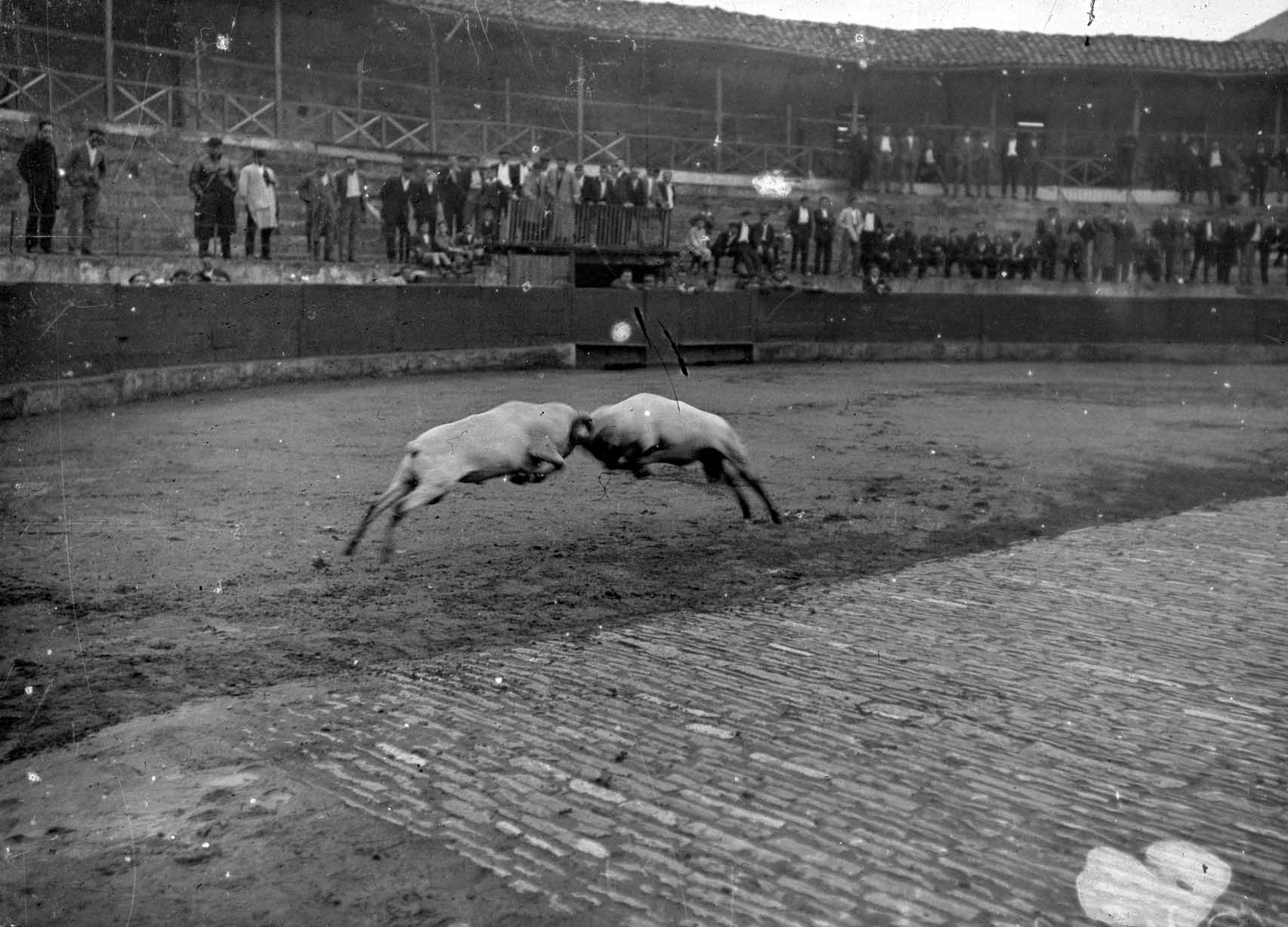
Basque ram-fighting in the square of Eibar in 1937

Ram fights, also variously called ahari apustuak (ram bets) and ahari talka (ram bump) are very popular around the Urola basin in towns like Azpeitia (between October and June) and Arroa. They test the strength and endurance of the rams, using their natural inclination to fight other rams.

The rams are trained and fed on a variety of secret diets involving things like beans, apples, red wine, carrots or egg yolk. A basic fight goes over at least 8 ekintaldi (attacks), also called kintze (from Spanish quince "15"), with the best of 8 winning. To score a point, a ram has to land a square hit on his opponent's head or horns. If the ram runs away at the start, the owner is allowed to bring him back into the ring once. There are records of bets over 100 attacks, but these are rare now.

Although the strongest rams are said to come from the Aralar Mendilerroa mountain range between Gipuzkoa and Navarre, they are also said to be too placid so the preference is for rams from the region around Urbasa, Andia, and Gorbeia.

The Basque Government controversially banned the Iurreta ahari topekas in 2007 on animal welfare grounds.

This sport is called peleas de carneros in Spanish.

=== Aitzur jaurtiketa (hoe throwing) ===
A game of throwing hoes.

In Spanish this is called lanzamiento de azada and in French as lancer de houe.

=== Antzar jokoa (goose game) ===
There are two variations of this game depending on whether it is played at a seaside town or inland. In a seaside town, a long rope is suspended between a pole on the quay and the mast of a boat. A dead goose (previously live geese were used too) is suspended head down in the middle of the rope. Teams now have to row out and a designated person must jump up, grab the goose, hang on to it and try to remove the head before falling off. At the same time, sailors at both ends of the rope try their best to shake the person clinging to the goose off. The team that collects the most heads wins. Inland, the rope is suspended over the ground and the same goal must be achieved from horseback.

The most famous of these is held in Lekeitio on Antzar Eguna (goose day), held between 1 and 8 September, which goes back at least to the year 1877, when it was played only by sailors. It has also been celebrated on other days in other villages, sometimes (for example in Gernika) using chicken instead of geese.

In Spanish this is called juego de gansos and in French as jeu d'oie.

=== Ardi ile moztea (sheep shearing) ===
Sheep shearing also features in Basque rural sports and works along similar lines as other sheep shearing contests. Ardi ile moztea translates as "the shearing of sheep's wool" and it is also known as ardi moztea "sheep shearing".

=== Asto arineketan (donkey races) ===
Similar to horse racing but with donkeys.

=== Blankolari (shooting) ===
Shotgun shooting is particularly popular in the area around Eibar in the Basque Country.

In Spanish this is called puntería con escopeta and in French as compétition avec escopette.

=== Bola jokoa (bowls) ===
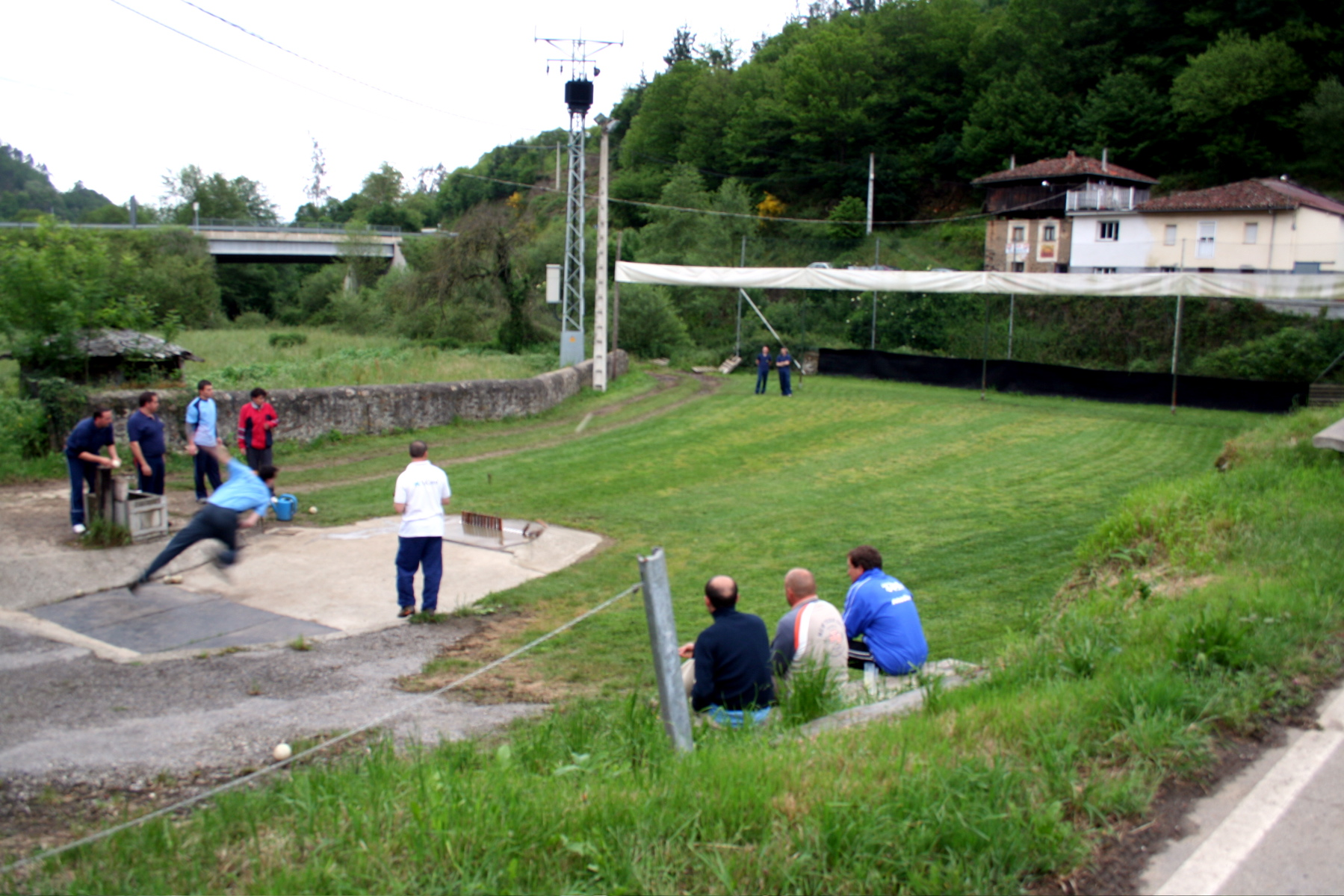
A variety of dirt bowls in Asturias

Basques have also their own variants of dirt-track and lawn bowls. There is a large number of variations of the game but most are similar to skittles and centre around a set of pins that must be knocked down with a ball.

=== Espadrila jaurtiketa (espadrilles tossing) ===
A game of throwing espadrilles, a kind of shoe with a straw sole.

In Spanish this is called lanzamiento de alpargata and in French as lancer d'espadrille.

=== Estropadak (rowing competitions) ===
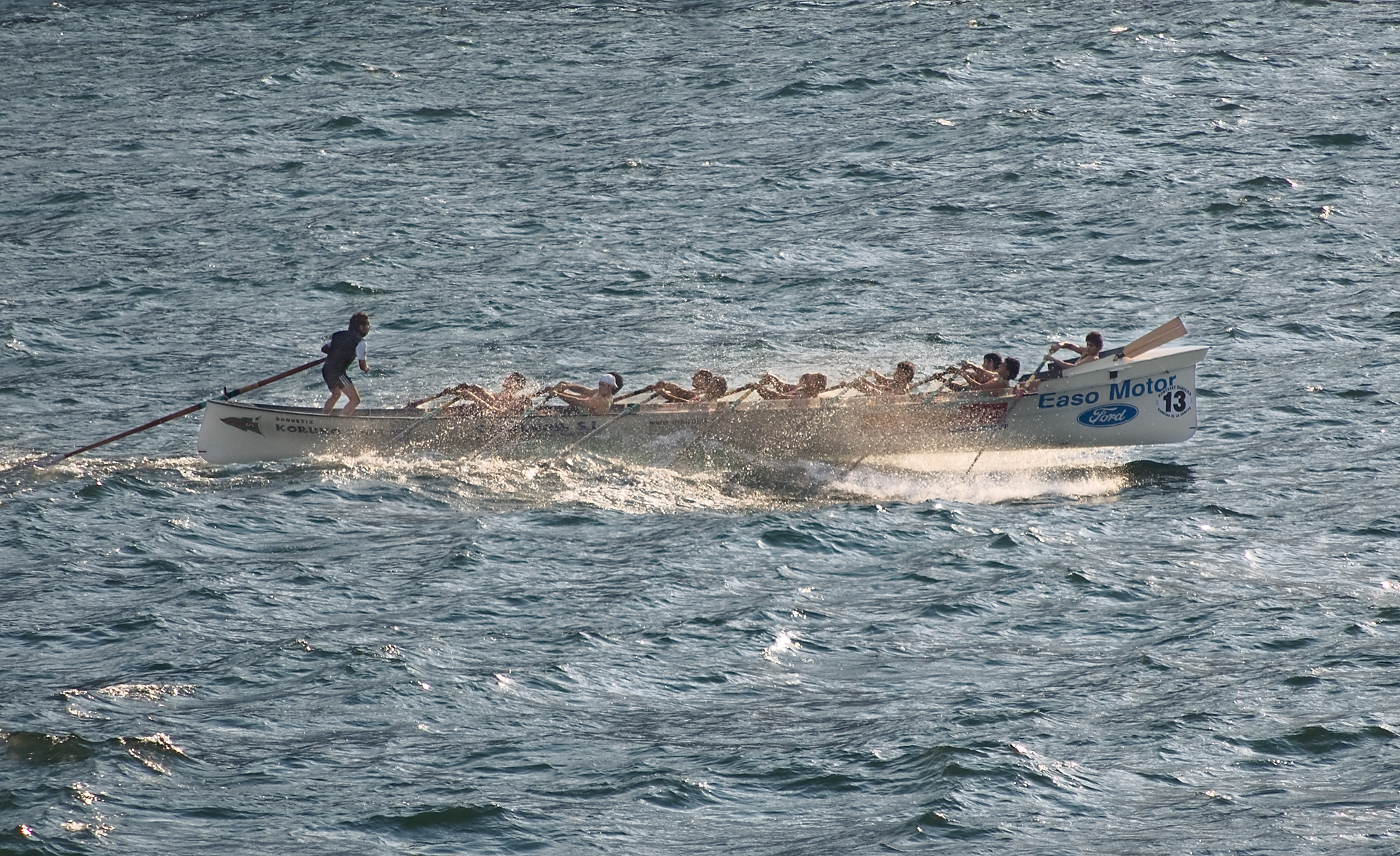
Competing for the Kontxako Bandera.

A very popular rowing competition all along the coast of the Bay of Biscay and the Northern coast of the Iberian Peninsula.

This sport hails back to the days when fishermen had to reach fishing grounds quickly and return to port as quickly as possible to achieve the best price.

The crew is made up of thirteen oarsmen and the cox, who faces them at the stern. The boats are called traineru (trainera in Spanish), and are derived from 19th century fishing boats.

The most important competition in the Bay of Biscay in summer takes place the first two Sundays in September: the Kontxako Bandera, where the best teams compete against each other, following a tradition which is over a hundred years old. There is a regatta in almost every seaside town between July and October.

=== Goitibeherak (soapbox cars) ===
In the Basque Country the tradition of building soapbox cars goes back at least to the early 20th century. The name is a contraction of goitik-behera which means "from the top to the bottom". Unlike most European soapbox cars, the goitibeherak are three-wheelers and the early versions simply consisted of a triangular frame on three wheels or even scavenged ball bearings with a plank to sit upon, which children would race down the slopes found in many Basque towns.

The earliest documented races date back to the mid-1970s, when races were held during local festivals. The first Basque national competition was held in 1976, and they are common events all over the Basque Country today. One of the biggest events, the Goitibehera Munduko Txapelketa (World Goitibehera Championship) was first held in 1985 in Pamplona during the San Fermínes and has been held at irregular intervals since, the last time on 28 June 2008 when the IX World Championship was held.

The normal soapbox races are called carreras de carrilanas in Spanish, but this version is called goitiberas even in Spanish. They occur in the Basque Country and Uruguay to where they were exported by Basque emigrants.

=== Igel jokoa (frog game) ===
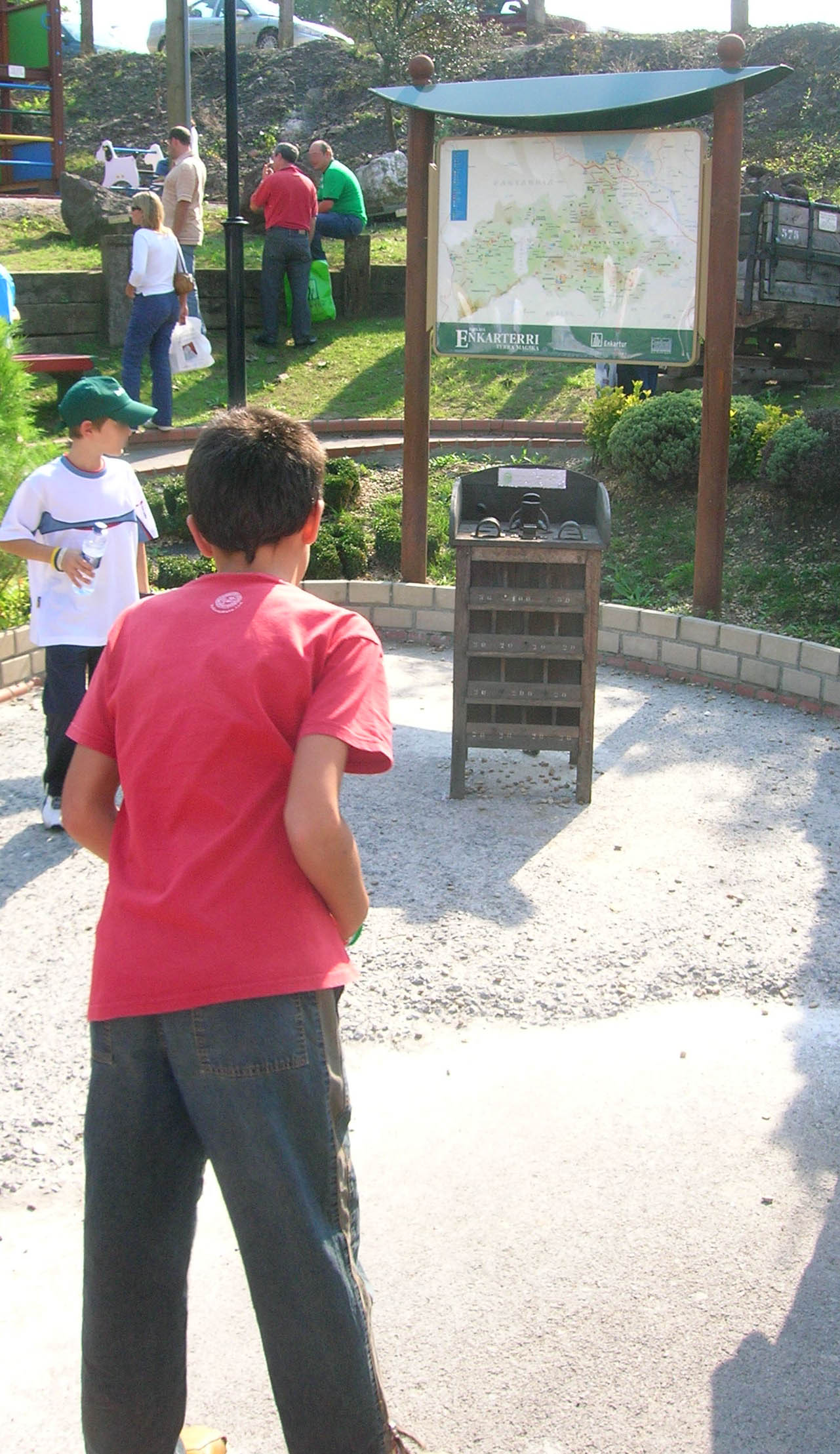
The frog game

The frog game is a pub game played both in the Basque Country and outside. In the Basque Country, it is commonly played in Basque sagardotegiak (cider houses) and taverns. The aim of the game is to score as many points as possible by throwing ten metal discs at a chest.

The chest can be placed at a range of distances away from the players, usually 8–15 paces. On top of the chest, there is an iron frog with an open mouth, a mill, and a bridge. Underneath are more empty compartments. In most variants, a player who manages to hit the frog's mouth is awarded 50 points; 25 points are awarded for getting the disc under the mill, 10 for the bridge, and 5 for any of the compartments below. Other scoring systems also exist.

Some frog chests have obstacles built into the frog, mill, and bridge to make the game more difficult. Discs that have hit any mark are collected at the back of the chest via a set of metal tubes.

In Spanish, this game is called juego de la rana in Spain and Chile, juego de sapo in Peru and Argentina, tiro al sapo in Bolivia, and just rana in Colombia. In French, it is referred to as jeu de la grenouille. In England, it is known as toad in the hole.

=== Korrika (racing) ===
Also a popular sport in the Basque country. There are broadly speaking two categories:

- races held in bullrings where a circle with a 15 m (49 ft) radius. Competitors try to complete a set number of laps as fast as possible.
- cross country races, usually of more than 10 km (6.2 mi).

A highly popular race, the Korrika, is held once a year in aid of Basque schools and crosses all parts of the Basque Country. The goal is not competition, but the raising of funds and awareness.

A variant of the korrika are the ibiltariak (walkers), a fast walking race that was particularly popular in Navarre in the 19th and 20th century with the walkers wearing the abarketa, a traditional Basque leather shoe, and a hazel stick.

The traditional forms of running korrika have been largely supplanted by modern forms of running and racing.

=== Kukaina (yard climbing) ===
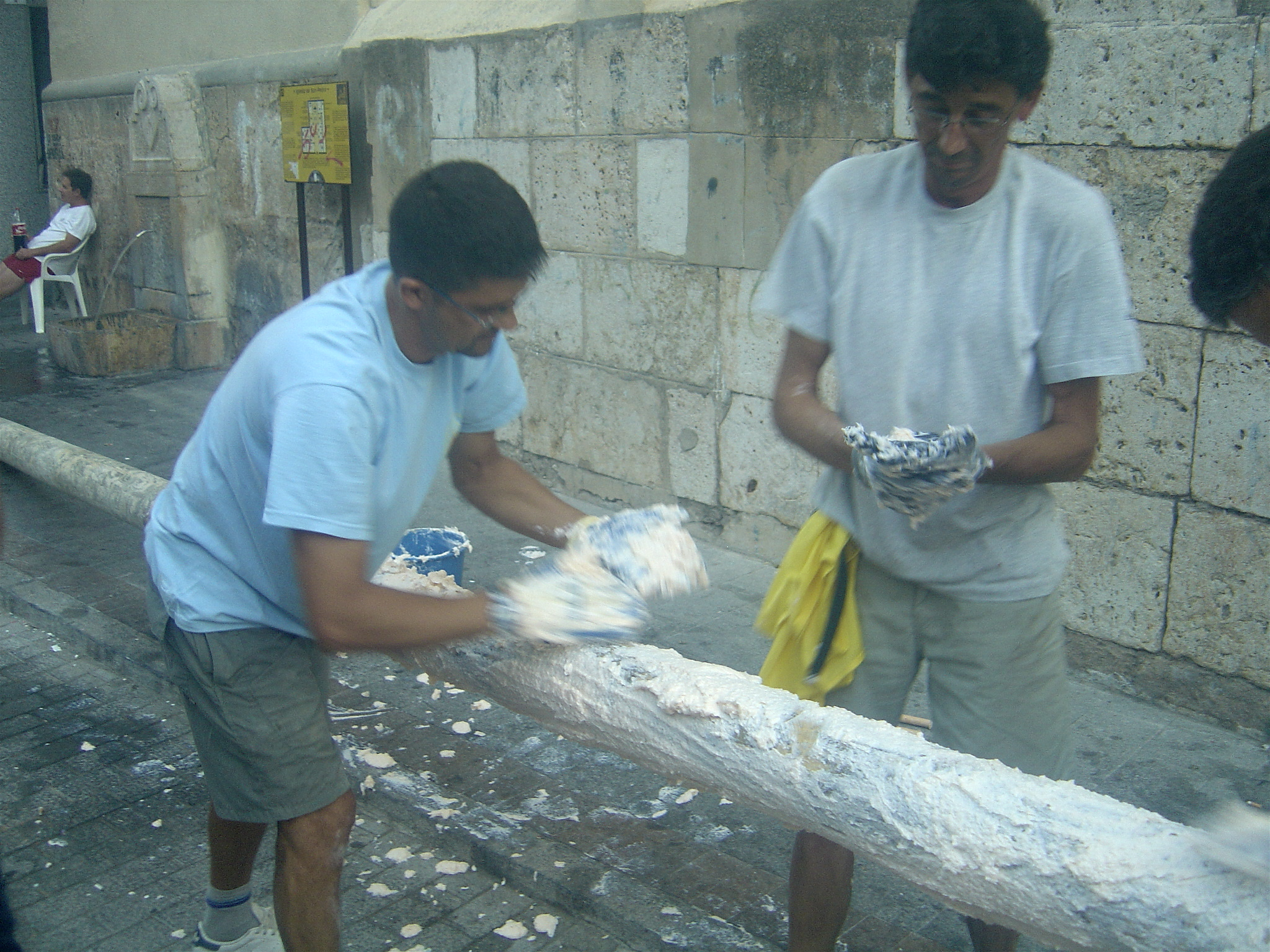
Greasing the Cockaigne pole for the Tomatina in Buñol, Valencia.

This variant of the Neapolitan greasy pole game is usually played on a yard that is suspended horizontally over water. A piece of cloth is attached to the far end of the yard and competitors have to try to reach it and retrieve it. A variant uses a greased vertical pole. It can also be spelled kukaña, a word which derives from the Spanish word cucaña (Cockaigne) and in French monter du mât.

=== Laiariak (laia competitions) ===
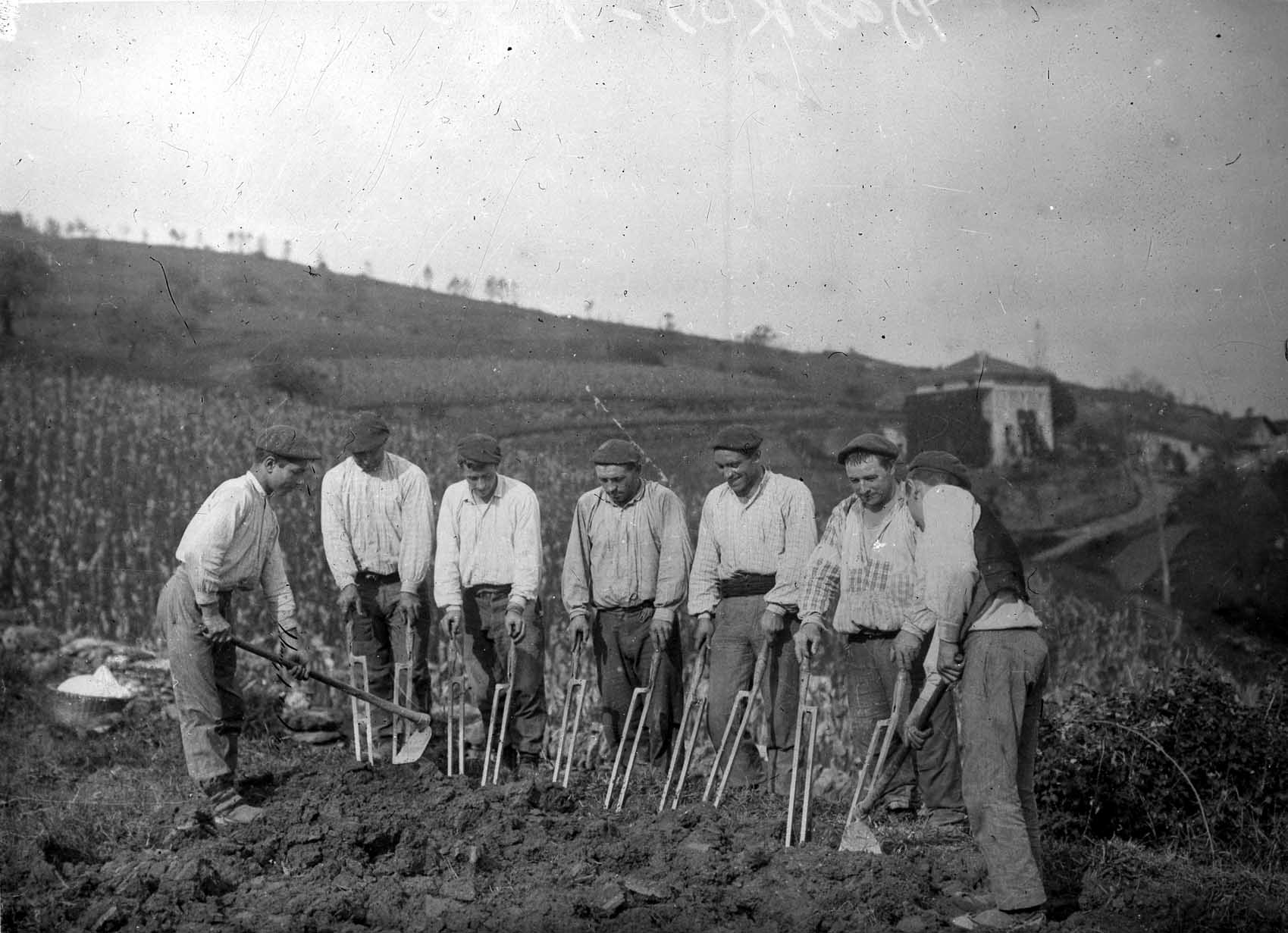
Laiariak in the Hernani region

This is a competition involving the laia, a farming implement that resembles a two-pronged heavy pitchfork with an off-centre handle, either with a long or short handle. Traditionally four or five members of either gender of a baserri family are picked to compete as a team, the task being to turn over a plot of land as quickly as possible.

A variation of this is laia lasterketa, a laia race where the competitors stand on a pair of laiak and race, not dissimilar to a race on stilts.

The laia was a very widespread instrument used to loosen soil. With the advent of modern farming machinery, its use is now restricted to area machines cannot reach, for example on high slopes, and kitchen gardens.

In Spanish this is called layadores or layar, in French as bêcher.

=== Makil tira (stick pulling) ===
In this game, two players sit on the ground with their feet touching, separated by a plank. Both players also hold onto a makila, and the aim is to lift one's opponent to their feet.

In Spanish this is called Tiro del palo, in French as tir au bâton.

=== Oilar jokoa (chicken game) ===
This term in Basque covers two sorts of chicken games:

- cockfighting, which was outlawed in 1926.
- a game where a chicken is buried to the neck and blindfolded. Competitors, themselves blindfolded too, have to locate the chicken guided by the music of a txistulari or drummer. In the old days the goal was to remove the head from the chicken once it was located but when played today, it is sufficient to touch the head. The most famous oilar jokoa is held in Legazpi in June today but the game used to be more widespread.

=== Palanka jaurtiketa (metal bar throwing) ===
The throwing of a metal bar was once one of the most popular and widespread of Basque sports. Its popularity waned during the 19th century. Having died out in most areas, it survived the longest in parts of Gipuzkoa until its ultimate demise in the 20th century.

The palankari (thrower) throws a palanka, a traditional mining tool weighing between 8 and 25 kg (18 and 55 lb) as far as possible. Various throwing techniques were employed, most involving the palankari twisting around before launching the palanka. Some techniques by name are:

- bueltaerdiz "with half a turn"
- bularretik "from the chest"
- hankartetik "from between the legs"

The origins of this sport are in the mining industry where the palanka was traditionally used to prepare the holes into which explosives were then placed from the 15th century onwards. As a pastime, the miners would see who could throw the heavy tool the furthest in their breaks.

Curiously, the Spanish athlete Miguel de la Quadra-Salcedo used a javelin-throwing technique based on the Basque techniques of throwing the palanka at the 1960 Summer Olympics in Rome. Initially breaking the world record in javelin-throwing, his record was later annulled when the IAAF amended its rules to exclude techniques that at any point in time involve the athlete or the javelin facing or pointing toward the audience.

In Spanish this is called lanzamiento de barra or barra vasca and in French lancement de bar de mine.

=== Pegarra lasterketa (pitcher race) ===
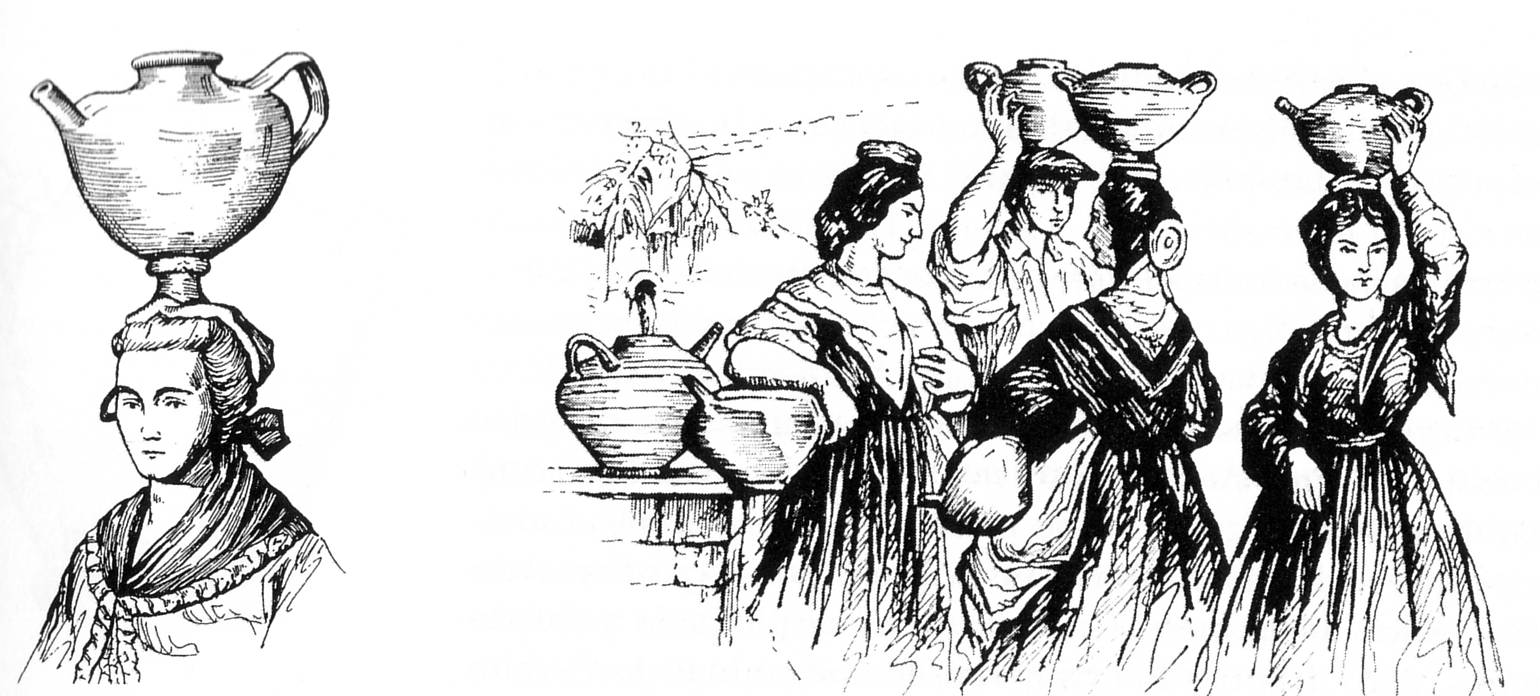
Basques carrying pegarras in the 18th century.

This sport involves a pitcher variously called eu:pegarra, bera, es:pedarra and kantarue in Basque. It is a traditional ceramic pitcher that resembles a fat teapot, with a diameter at the base of around 20 cm (7.9 in), a lid on the top with about 10 cm (3.9 in) diameter, and about 30 cm (12 in) tall and a fairly large spout. It can either be glazed or unglazed, with one or three handles (if it was designed to be hung) that was traditionally used to carry water.

It is carried on a head cushion called burutea and the aim of a race is to get to the finish line without dropping the pegarra. It is difficult to ascertain how old the sport is but one of the earliest records of the pegarra being used to carry water on the head dates back to a Dutch book from 1603 called Theatrum Orbis Terrarum by Abraham Ortelius which has an illustration of a Basque woman carrying a pegarra.

In Spanish this is called carrera de pedarras and in French course de pedarras.

=== Esku Pilota (Basque pelota) ===
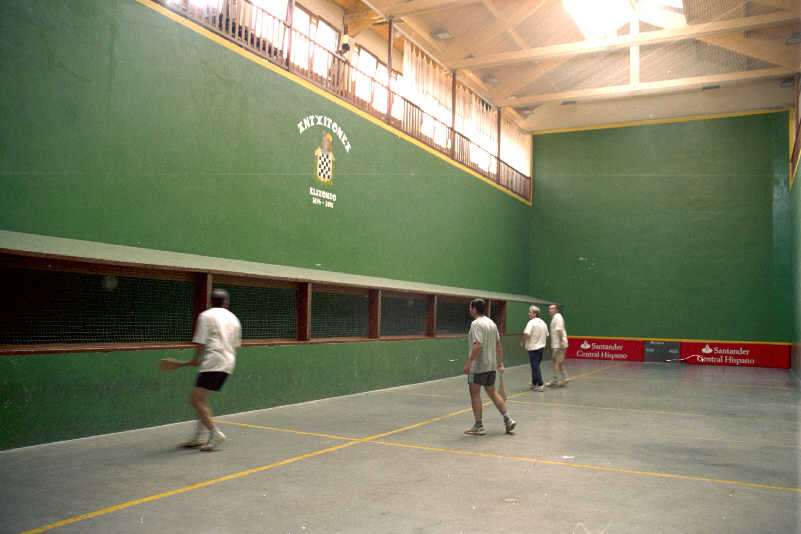
Playing pilota with wooden bats.

The Basque sport best known outside the Basque Country is Basque pelota. It is a Basque version of the family of ball games that covers squash, tennis, and real tennis, all of them thought to derive from the Jeu de paume and hence a relative of Valencian pilota.

But the main innovation of Basque pilota is that players share a common playground and throw the ball to a wall, making it an indirect game, while the other games in this family are generally direct games where the players face each other in two separate fields separated by a net or line on the ground. The Basques began playing pelota indirectly during the middle of the 19th century. For the different variations of Basque pelota, see the main article on Basque pelota.

While most of the best world players are Basque (in either the Spanish or the French federations), it is by no means limited to the Basque Country and is also played in Castile, Rioja and places where Basques have emigrated to such as Mexico, (home of frontenis), the United States, and the Philippines.

As such it has been an Olympic exhibition sport in Paris, Mexico, and Barcelona.

It is called pelota vasca in Spanish and pelote basque in French.

=== Pulsolariak (arm wrestling) ===
Basque arm wrestling follows broadly the same rules as anywhere else.

=== Recortes ===
A form of bull-leaping called errekorteak in Basque and recortes in Spanish, is practiced in parts of the Basque Country, especially Navarre.

=== Soka-muturra (bull-herding) ===
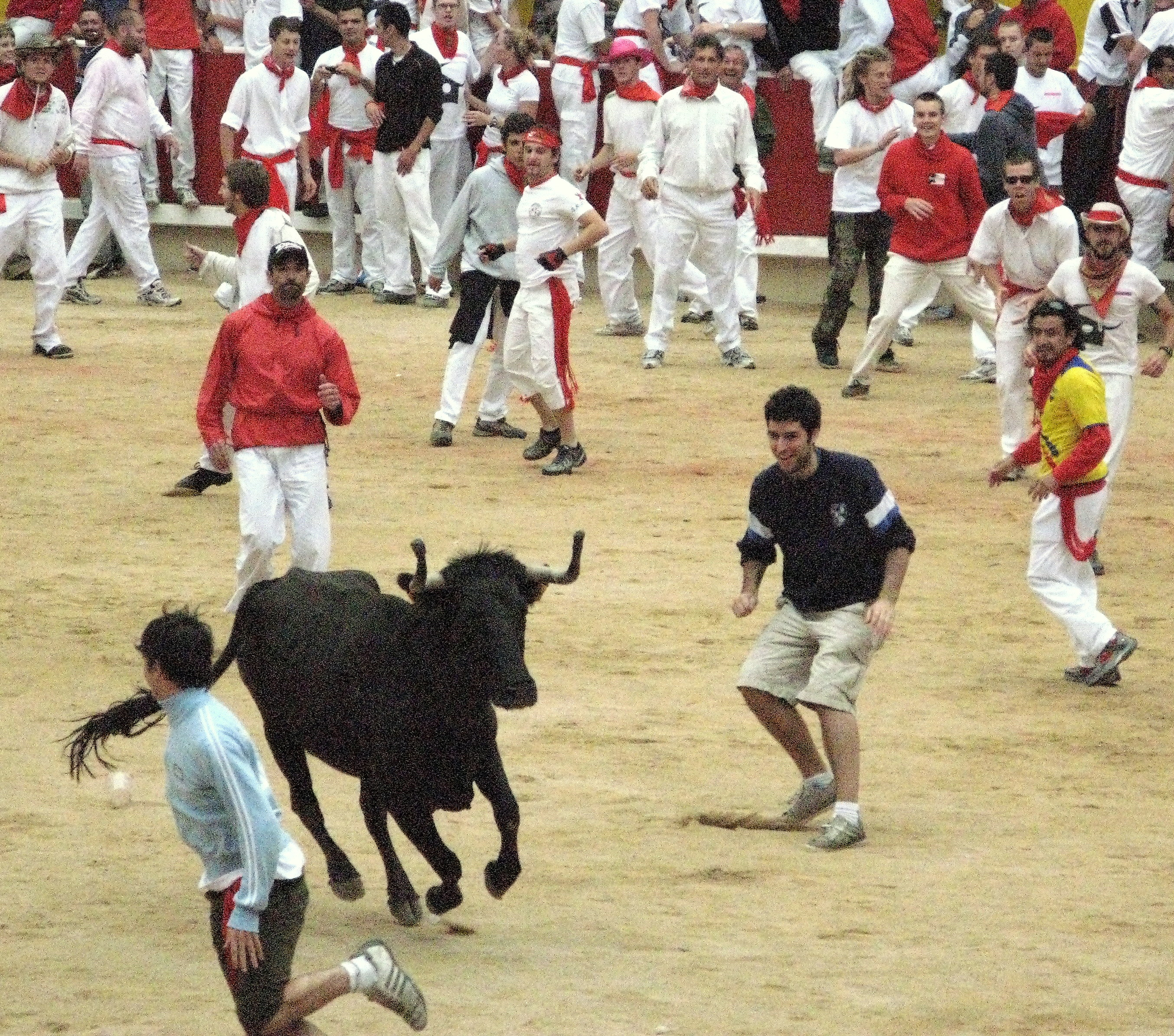
A calf with covered horn tips runs among youths in the Pamplona bull ring.

The name of this sport literally translates as "snout rope" (soka "rope" and mutur "snout"). It is vaquillas ("calves") in Spanish. It derives from a tradition where cattle destined for slaughter were led through the town on long ropes regularly on a particular day of the week (which varies from town to town). Occasionally a bull would break free on run wild, an event called karrera egitea (to make a run), while the crowds made sport of the bulls. From the 14th century onwards bulls were increasingly let loose on purpose, ultimately leading to the tradition of running the bulls. It's also known as soka-mutilen jokoa, the game of the rope boys.

Sometimes this would happen at night, with lights attached to the bulls, the most likely forerunner of the zezen-suzko or "fire bull". In the zezen-suzko, a contraption of fireworks is strapped to a bull and lit at night.

Today this is sometimes also practised in bullrings, either temporary or permanent, using calves rather. If fully grown bulls are used it is as a prelude for a bullfight, which is a regular feature of the Running of the Bulls in Iruñea/Pamplona.

=== Toka ===
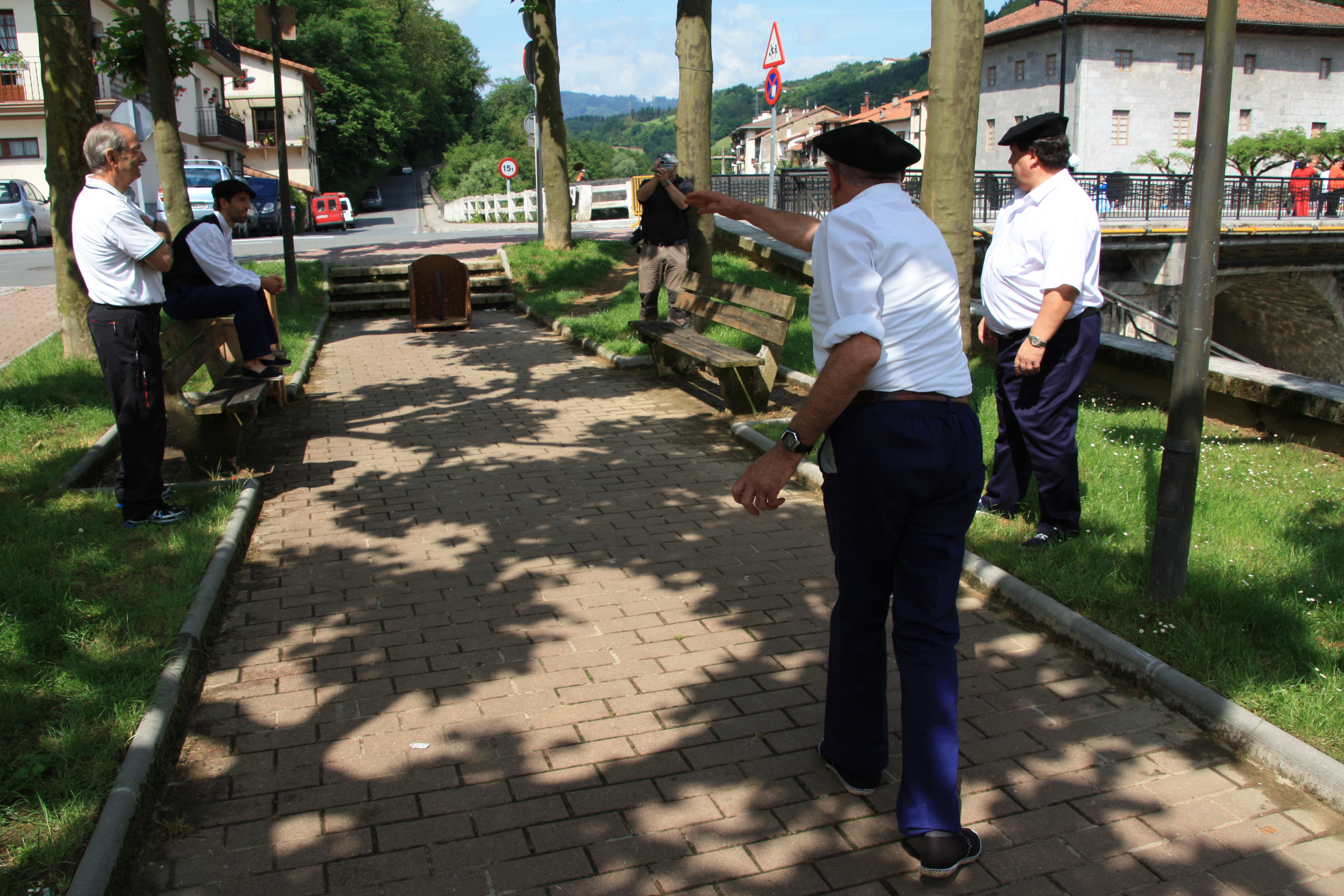
Basques playing toka in Alegia

This is game involves throwing small objects like pebbles, balls or coins across a distance, trying to hit the target, a vertical metal pole.

It is called juego de la raya in Spanish and jeu de la raie in French.

=== Txakur probak (sheepdog trials) ===
Sheepdog trials are another lively example of the Basque traditional pastoral lifestyle. They're also called artzain txakurren trebetasun lehiaketak or "shepherd dogs skill competitions".

Sheepdog trials in the Basque Country are very similar to those held in other countries and involves a sheepdog having to herd a flock of ewes into a fold. Traditionally the euskal artzain txakurra or Basque shepherd dog is kept but border collies are also increasingly popular. Identifying the best dogs for breeding is an important part to these competitions. A major Basque sheepdog trial event is held in Oñati in September.

In Spanish this is called concursos de perro pastor and in French concours de chien de berger.

== See also ==
- Basque people
- Basque breeds and cultivars
- Highland Games
