= Beizama =

- Municipality
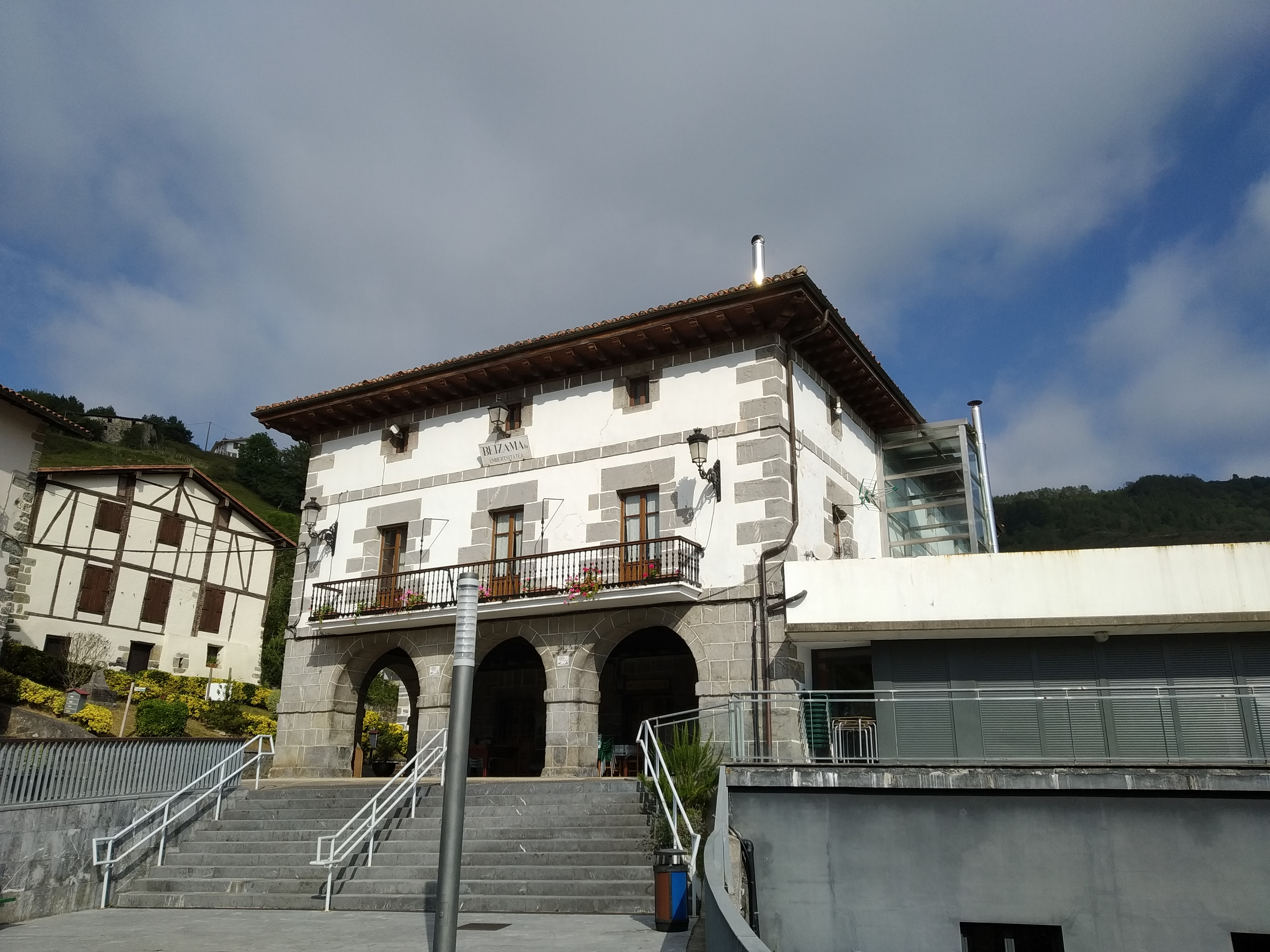

- Coat of arms

- Location of Beizama within the Basque Country Location of Beizama within Spain
- Coordinates: 43°08′03″N 2°12′01″W
- Country: Spain
- Autonomous community: Basque Country
- Province: Gipuzkoa
- Comarca: Urola Kosta

Government
  - Mayor: Maria Begoña Garmendia Vazquez

Area
  - Total: 16.55 km^{2} (6.39 sq mi)
- Elevation: 485 m (1,591 ft)

Population (2025-01-01)
  - Total: 128
  - Density: 7.73/km^{2} (20.0/sq mi)
- Time zone: UTC+1 (CET)
  - Summer (DST): UTC+2 (CEST)
- Postal code: 20739
- Official language(s): Basque, Spanish

Beizama is a town in the province of Gipuzkoa, in the autonomous community of Basque Country, in the north of Spain.
