= Basque bowls =

Basque variants of bowling games

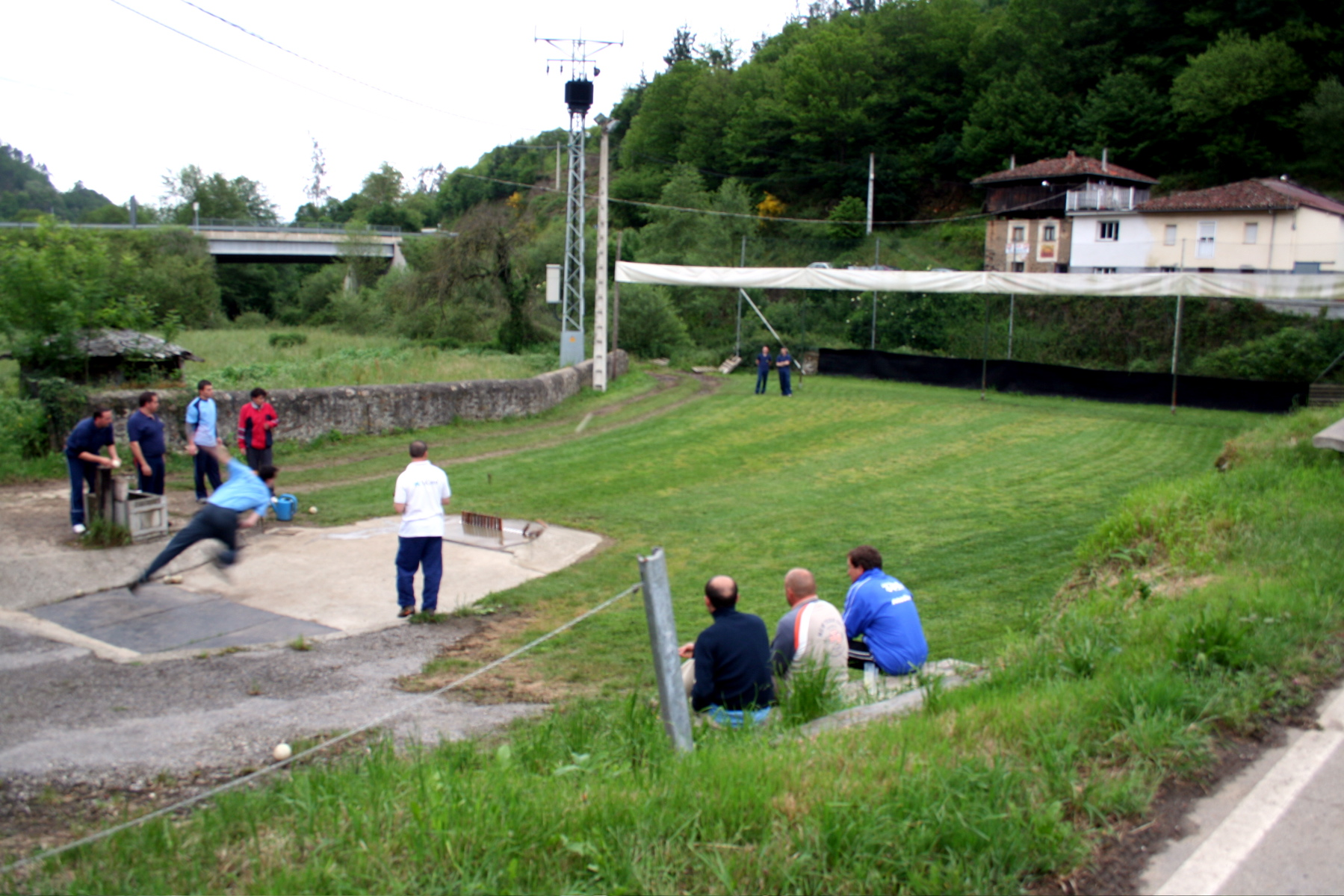
A variety of dirt bowls in Asturias, North of Spain

Basque bowls (Basque: bola jokoa), is one of the few Basque rural sports which do not originate in an activity related to rural or marine work. It has a number of other names too and is played in a bolatoki or bolaleku "bowls place" which often consists of a playing area in the open, an open sided structure with a low roof or a playing area located inside a colonnaded hallway.

The game has been more common in the southern parts of the Basque Country in the last few centuries, especially in Álava and Biscay and to a lesser degree in Gipuzkoa and Navarre but documents from the Bayonne archives from the 17th-century mention the games and there is also other evidence to show that the game was also played historically in the northern part of the Basque Country.

The main characteristic of the Basque variants of the game is the more prominent use of balls with finger-holes and hand-holes which distinguishes it from other regions in the area which prefer balls without.

== Basic terms ==
- the game is variously called pirlak, pirleak, bolak and botxak (from boccia); -ak is a Basque plural ending.
- the bowling ball is called bola
- the pins are variously called bolo, pirla, pirle, birla, txirla, esku, zilla, erdiko or guena
- a player is called bolari
- a playing area is called bolatoki

== The game ==
They are all variants of dirt-track and lawn bowls and as such related to games such as bowls, skittles and bowling. There is a large number of different variations of the game (over 25 variants in Biscay and Álava alone), sometimes sharing their rules with varieties in other areas like Cantabria, Burgos or León. Some varieties are extremely localised and with specialised playing areas not found outside the area.

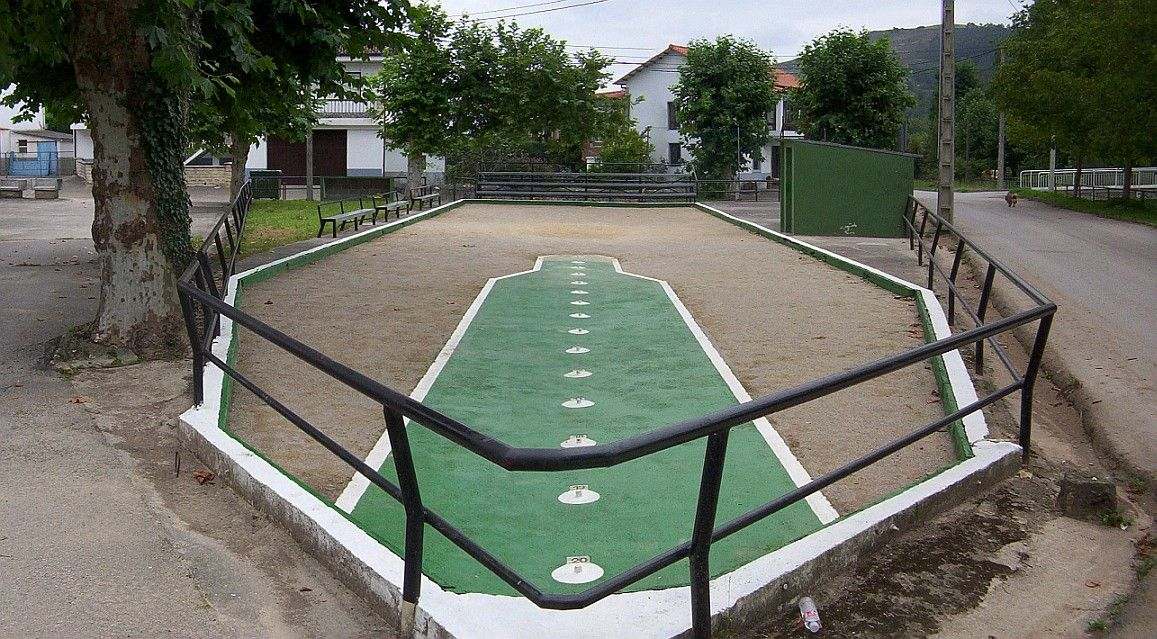
A playing area for Cantabrian bolo palma

The main points of variation center around points such as:

- how many pins there are and how they are arranged
- the shape of the bolatokia

Due to societal changes, some variants are reduced to events at fiestas rather than everyday past-times. For example, of the over 400 playing areas that existed in Biscay in the last century, only some 100 remain. At the same time, organised competitions are also held these days among the provincial federations and clubs. Always keen to embrace new technologies, enthusiasts are also using the internet to attract new members and players.

== Particular variants ==
Many varieties are known only by the geographical affiliation: Arabar boloa (Álavan bowls), Burgosko bola (Burgos bowls), Gesaltzako bola (Gesaltza bowls), Palentziako bola (Palencia bowls), and so on.

=== Aiara bowls ===
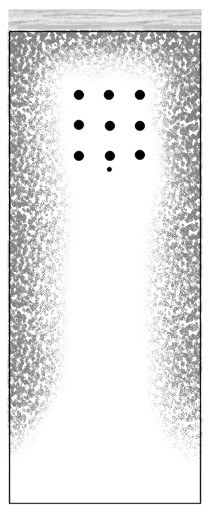
Aiarako Erremontea

Known as Aiarako bola jokoa and Aiararra in Basque, ayalés and remonte in Spanish. Two bolatoki in Aiara for this variant remain in popular use but other exist in an area between Gueñes, Artziniega, Tertanga, and Ibarra.

The sunken playing area, called carrejo or boladera is 20 to 28 m (66 to 92 ft) long and 3.5 to 4.2 m (11 to 14 ft) wide, surrounded by slanting sides, giving the playing area the appearance of a large, sunken trough. Originally played on clay, many use a wooden floor now. The launching area is up to 5 m (16 ft) long and the nine large pins are arranged in a 3x3 square at the far end. There is also a small pin (called bolinchín, cuatro, txikerra or chiquito) which is worth four points. The balls have finger and hand-holes, are 28–30 cm (11–12 in) in diameter and usually weigh between 8–14 kg (18–31 lb), but heavier ones have been used.

The player, using spin, launches the ball onto either the left or right long incline and to achieve a valid throw, has to knock over at least the small pin and one large pin. The ball the (ideally) rebounds from the back incline and knocks over more pins. Pins knocked over by other pins also count.

=== Álavan bowls ===
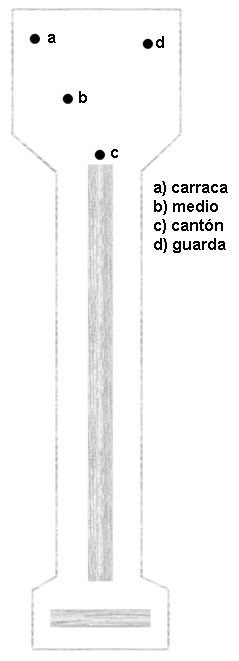
Arabar boloa

Called Arabar boloa or lautadakoa (the one from the lautada) in Basque, juego de bolo alavés and bolo de la Llanada in Spanish. The playing area consists of three main parts, all of which are a step down from the surrounding areas:

- the parra or pato which is a sunken wooden board delineating the edge of the area where the player may launch from
- the loma which is an 18 to 21 m (59 to 69 ft) long wooden plank, between 18–20 cm (7.1–7.9 in) wide running between the walls of the sunken into the ground.
- the pin area, where the playing area widens again, with markers for the location of the pins.

The balls have no handles, weigh between 2.1–2.5 kg (4.6–5.5 lb) and have a diameter of 16–17 cm (6.3–6.7 in) with have no finger or hand-holes. There are four pins arranged in a triangle with the point towards the players. The one closes to the parra is the cantón, to the back and left is the carraca, to the back and right the guarda and directly behind the cantón sits the medio. The distance between the carraca and the guarda is about 2.4 m (7 ft 10 in).

The players must launch the ball onto the loma, stay on it (otherwise a foul is declared which is called zula) and at the very least knock over the cantón to score. The aim is to knock all four over but if the ball rebounds from the side panels and knocks over a pin, they do not count. Currently, there are over 1000 registered bowlers and more than one hundred bolatoki of this style remain predominantly in the central part of Álava. The most important competition is the annual Torneo Interpueblos.

=== Bederatzi txirlo jokoa ===
The history museum of Baiona has a historic exhibit of a bederatzi txirlo jokoa or "nine pin skittles" with pins of almost a meter in height. Bolo jokoak are not commonly played in this part of the Basque Country anymore but the game is assumed to have been played along the lines of the Bearnese game called quilhas de nau and quilles de neuf in French.

=== Bermeo bowls ===
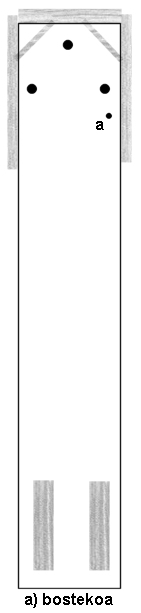
Bermeoko bola jokoa

Called Bermeoko bola jokoa in Basque and bolo de Bermeo in Spanish. The last bolatoki for this version disappeared during the 1940s and 1950s. The playing area for this version is rectangular, 13.5 m (44 ft) long and 1.5 m (4 ft 11 in) wide. At the player's end there are two launch boards sunken into the ground, parallel to each other at either side of the playing area. As in many bola jokoak the balls are launched onto the wooden planks because it helps maintain the forward speed of a ball, whereas launching it onto a dirt floor would tend to slow them down. At the far end, woode planks were fixed to the side panels to create a semi-hexagon. This game uses 4 pins, three nagusiak or "main ones" and one bostekoa or "one of five". The nagusiak are arranged in a triangle following the line of the semi-hexagon. The bostekoa is placed in front of either of the nagusiak, left or right depending on the direction of the game. The ball has two holes, one for the thumb and a larger one for the remaining four fingers. The game proceeds as follows:

- The players must launch the ball onto the launching planks to begin with. If the board is not hit, a txorra or toto is declared (foul) and the player gets zero points.
- The bostekoa (worth five points) must be hit first as it determines the direction of play. If the board is hit but no pin, six points are awarded.
- Following the bostekoa the ball will rebound from the side panels and ideally hit the big pins. The two nagusiak closest to the player are worth eight points each, the nagusia furthest away nine points.

If all nagusiak are knocked over, only 14 points are awarded however so with the bostekoa the maximum number of points is 19. The aim of the game is to reach 300 first.

=== Burgos bowls ===
The Basque name, Burgosko bola jokoa translates as "bowls from Burgos", bolo burgalés in Spanish. This variant arrived in the Basque Country late when some people from Burgos brought it to Basauri in 1980 and to Gasteiz in 1985. Since its spread to areas outside Burgos, championships have been held involving clubs from Burgos, Biscay and Álava.

The main characteristic of Burgosko bola is that it is played on two different levels, involving a goiko jokoa or "high game" (juego alto in Spanish) and a beheko jokoa "low game" or barruko jokoa "inside game" (juego bajo or juego interior in Spanish).

=== Ea bowls ===
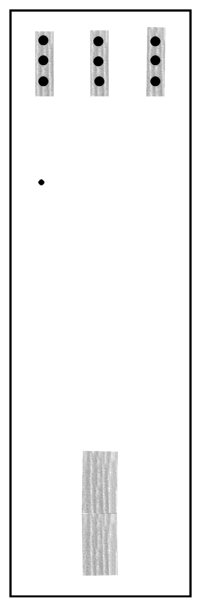
Ea aldekoa

This is called Ea aldekoa in Basque and juego de Ea in Spanish. This version is played on a sunken dirt playing field about 23 by 1.8 m (75.5 by 5.9 ft). The bowls have finger and hand-holes, weigh 8 kg (18 lb), and must be launched onto a 4 m (13 ft) long platform in the playing area for the throw to be valid. The aim is to knock down 10 pins at the other end, 9 large ones (45 cm (18 in) tall) and a small one (half the size of the big ones) in front of the big ones either at the centre, left of right.

The big pins are arranged in groups of three (one behind each other) in three lines at the far end of the track. A player has to hit the small pin (worth five points) first for it to be a valid throw, the other pins are worth one point each. Unlike in other variants, pins knocked over by a ball rebounding from the side panels also count.

There are two bolatoki left for this variant, one in Bedaroa and one in Natxitua. The one in Bedaroa is played mainly during town festivals.

=== Hiru oholtzar ===
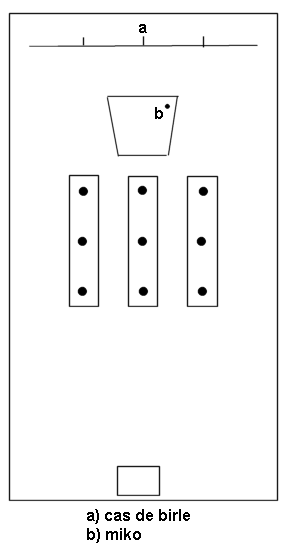
Hiru oholtzar

Originally from the Burgos area and called tres tablones in Spanish, this version was brought to the west of Biscay by migrants. This is a visually spectacular variant on a 30 m (98 ft) by 6 m (20 ft) playing field, balls weighing between 5–7 kg (11–15 lb) with a 28 cm (11 in) diameter which are launched at nine slim, pointed 35–40 cm (14–16 in) tall pins arranged in a square, one behind the other in groups of three. They are each worth one point except for the one at the center of the square which is worth two points. The aim is to scatter the pins as far away from their original location as possible. There is also a smaller 20 cm (7.9 in) tall pin called miko or cuatro (because it is worth four points). Depending on they type of game, each player has 2–4 balls per round and the miko is placed in two different positions behind the big pins.

In this variant, the ball and the central playing area are kept wet and the player launches the ball into the air and at the central row of pins using spin in an attempt to also catch the miko which is at the back and to the left or right of the central row. For a valid throw, the ball must pass a line in front of the pins in the air, touch down onto one of the platforms on which the pins stand and pass a line at the back on the ground to be a valid throw. Fouls are designated as follows:

- a morra is declared if the ball touches down before it reaches the pin platforms
- a zula is declared if the ball does not reach the back line
- a blanca is declared if the ball does not knock over and pins

In all these cases the throw is invalid and the player may not bowl again in this round.

Once a valid ball has come to rest past the line at the back, the player crosses over to the back area called cas de birle and is allowed to throw a second time from where the ball stopped but the miko is removed. Again, the throw has to be through the air until it touches down on a pin platform. There are usually also markers at the back indicating the lines of the pins.

It is a very popular game both in Biscay and Cantabria.

=== Kanaleko hiru txirlo ===
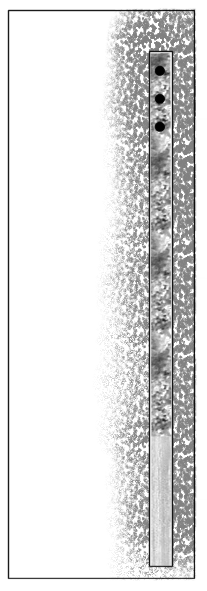
Kanaleko hiru txirlo

Called hiru txirlo común in Spanish), this is a variant of bola jokoa played in the Basque Country. The name kanaleko hiru txirlo literally translates as "3 pins of the canal" but it also goes by the name of hiru txirlo arrunta (common three pins). This game is still fairly widespread in the east of Biscay from Mendiola to Mutriku and parts of Gipuzkoa (the Deba valley), there are bolo federations for this variant at the cross-provincial level and annual leagues.

The game is played under a roof on a playing area about 25 m (82 ft) long and 2.5 m (8 ft 2 in) wide. In this variant the balls are 2.5 kg (5.5 lb) heavy, made of wood with finger and hand holes and are not entirely spherical. Each player has two of these. There are three 21 cm (8.3 in) tall pins with a 5 cm (2.0 in) diameter are arranged in a line one behind the other with 1 m (3 ft 3 in) gaps between them. These have names in Basque:

- the one closest to the players is called the eskua (hand)
- the middle one zilla or erdikoa (the middle one)
- the one furthest away guena.

Between the pins and the launching area there is a 19 m (62 ft) long, narrow elevated canal called kanala, pista or ibilbidea (walkway), located on the right hand side of the playing area. The lower lying dirt floor on the left is called the kalea (street). The ball must be rolled onto a launching plate and towards the pins along the elevated pista. The aim is to knock down the pins without the ball falling into the kalea. This is the trickiest part of the game and various techniques are employed to keep the ball on track such as:

- azpijana eman, to add backspin
- gainjana eman, to add topspin

When launched, the ball must hit the launch plate otherwise a ohol-hutsa is declared and the throw is invalid. If the ball stays on the canal but doesn't hit any pins, a gain-huts (top zero) is declared, if the middle one is left standing an erdikuts (middle zero) is declared. The maximum one can make is three per throw, either by knocking the pins over with the ball or by a pin knocking another pin. Pins knocked over by a ball rebounding from the sides do not count.

Bets are placed either by guessing the number of pins that will or will not get knocked over using the following phrases:

- bat baietz (one yes), bi baietz (two yes), hiru baietz (three yes)

or

- bat ezetz (one no), bi ezetz (two no), hiru ezetz (three no)

=== Katxete ===
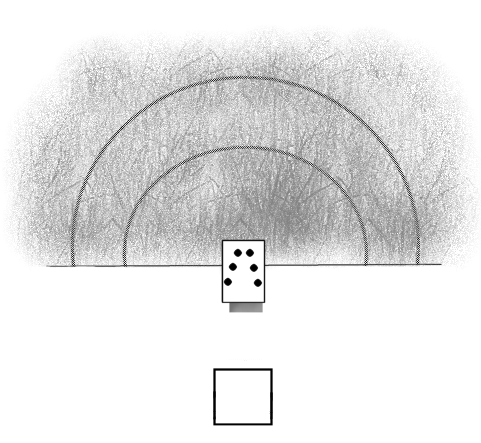
Katxete

This version (bolos a cachete, "smack bowling" in Spanish) is played in the mining area of the Enkarterri today although bolatokiak also exist in Biscay, in the area from Barakaldo to Muzkiz. A bolatoki for this game is also called a carrejo and was formerly often played on threshing floors.

The ball in katxete weighs 3.5–4 kg (7.7–8.8 lb) and have not hand or finger-holes. The 4-6 pins weigh 1 kg (2.2 lb), are about 9 cm (3.5 in) tall and are oblate spheroids. They need to have this flattened shape because the tako ("woodblock") upon which they are placed isn't level but has an inclined surface, the end furthest away from the player being higher up. They are arranged in a V shape, with the point of the V pointing away from the player. Right in front of the tako is the ur putzua or "water puddle". The purpose of the puddle is that the player's helper (called armador) can wet the pins and the tako before the shot.

The aim is to knock the pins across the lawn over one of two semicircles, called marrak (lines), delineating the edge of the bolatoki. The first marra is 10 m (33 ft) away from the tako and the second 18.5 m (61 ft). To score a point, the pins have to pass the first marra, otherwise a txorra is declared and no points are scored. If a pin passes the second marra, it is worth two points and a game usually is played to 200 or 300 points.

There are up to 20 bolatoki for this variant and there are federations at the provincial level and annual league games.

=== León bowls ===
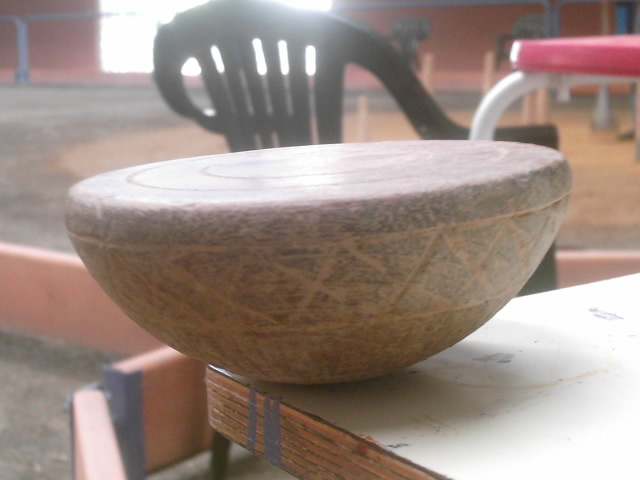
A bola for León bowls

Called Leongo jokoa in Basque and juego leonés in Spanish and as the name suggests, this variant comes from the pronvince of León but is common throughout Spain today. In the Basque Country it is played roughly in the area between Basauri and Portugalete.

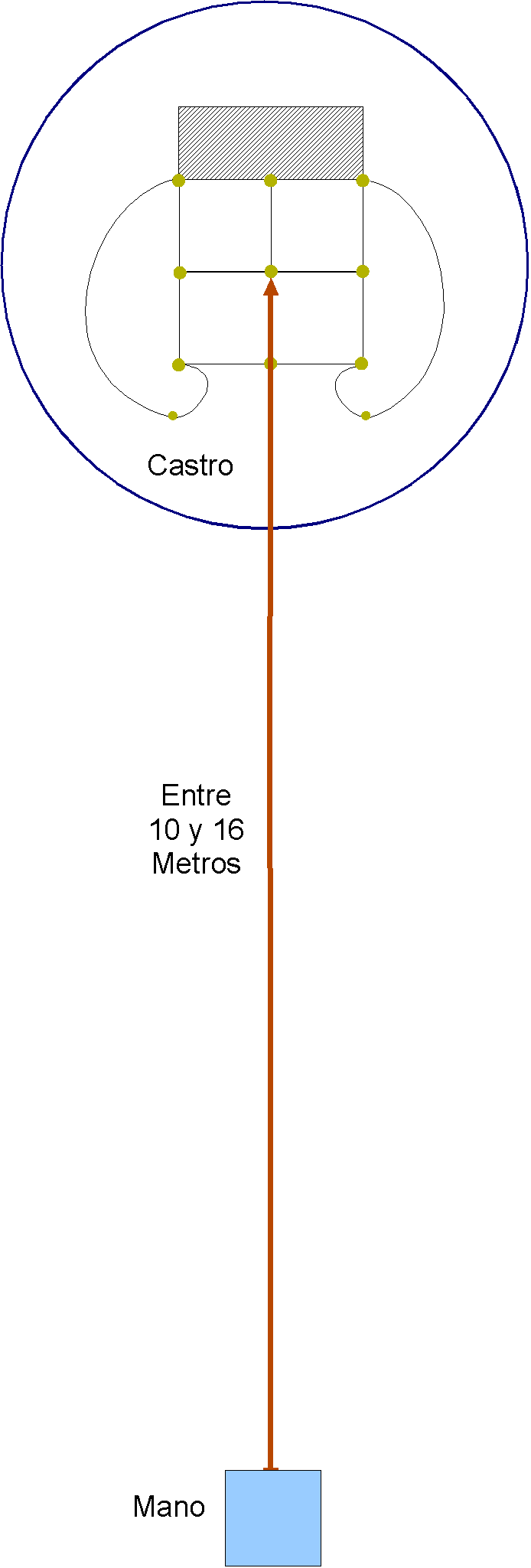
The playing area for León bowls

The minimum playing area for this game is 25 to 30 m (82 to 98 ft) long and 9 to 10 m (30 to 33 ft) wide, split into two main areas: the castro (castle) where the 10 pins are located and the rest of the playing area. There are nine large pins which are 55 cm (22 in) tall and a smaller one called miche which is 30 cm (12 in) tall. The nine large ones are arranged in a 3x3 square, the one at the centre being called medio.

The wooden balls are the most extraordinary characteristic of this variant because they are hemispheres and weigh up to 1 kg (2.2 lb). Around the castro are a number of lines:

- the hamaikaren marra or "line of 11" (línea del once in Spanish), which goes from the chincón to the miche
- the marra osagarria or "complementary line (línea complementaria in Spanish) which goes from the miche to the third pin
- the parada which is a circle with a 2.25 m (7 ft 5 in) diameter around the castro
- the sobrecastro which is 50 cm (20 in) behind the castro

There are two parts to a player's round. In the first, the player stands in the square launching area called mano at a distance of 6 to 22 m (20 to 72 ft) from the castro to throw the ball through the air into the castro. When it touches the ground (which is kept moist), it must neither stop there or rebound but spin onwards for the throw to be valid. At this stage scores are allocated as follows if the ball is valid and comes to rest inside the parada:

- if the ball does not touch down in the castro a cinca is declared and the throw is worth no points
- if the ball only knocks over the medio, the throw is worth two points
- if the ball does not knock over any pins or just one, the throw is worth six points
- if the ball knocks over two pins, the throw is worth seven points; any extra pin is worth an additional point

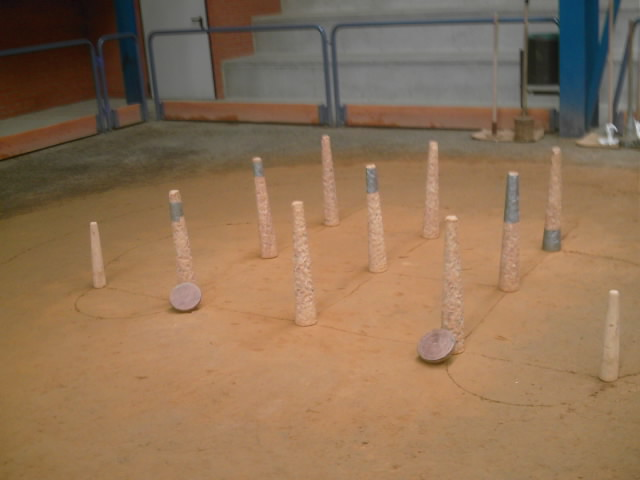
The castro

If the throw is valid and comes to rest outside the parada, scores are allocated as follows:

- if the ball only knocks over the medio, the throw is worth two points
- if no pins or just one pin is knocked over, the throw is worth one point
- if two pins are knocked over, the throw is worth two points; any extra pin is worth an additional point

There are also special combinations of pins knocked over and path of the ball which can be worth up to 16 points (called ahorcada), for example if the ball touches down in the castro, only knocks over the miche and then comes to rest inside the parada.

In the second part, called birlaketa (birle in Spanish), the player can bowl a second time towards the castro from where the ball landed provided it landed outside the parada circle. At this stage, if only the miche is knocked over, no point is awarded.

=== Munadun erremontea ===
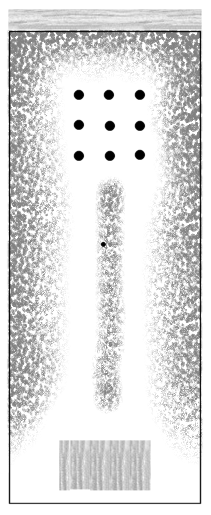
Munadun erremontea

This game is called also called Zornotza aldekoa or "the one from the Zornotza area", remonte con muna and juego de Zornotza in Spanish. This version was particularly common in Biscay roughly in the area between Zollo and Bernagoitia and is still fairly widespread, especially in the area of Amorebieta-Etxano where most bolatokiak are attached to rural churches. There are bolo federations at the provincial level and annual leagues for this variant.

It is played on a rectangular clay surface, 24–27 m (79–89 ft) long and 4.5–5 m (15–16 ft) wide. The sides of the playing area rises upwards but the most obvious characteristic of this variant is the muna, a ridge that runs down the middle of the playing area. At the far end it is delineated by the topea, a wooden anel. The aim is to knock down ten pins, 9 large ones (up to 52 cm (20 in) tall) arranged in a 3x3 square and a small one called txakina. The balls weigh 10–12 kg (22–26 lb) and have a hand and finger-hole.

The player stands in the launching area to throw the ball which must touch down in the ohola or landing area just past the launching area, consisting of a number of sunken boards. This area is about 3 m (9.8 ft) long and if the ball does not touch down here first, it is declared lur (ground) and invalid. The ball then travels down some 15 m (49 ft) on the ground, sides or muna to reach the area of the pins.

The large pins are worth one point each except the one at the centre of the square which is worth two. The txakina is worth either six or ten points and can be placed just about anywhere within the playing area and the maximum number of points in a throw is 20. Other throws are calculated as follows for a valid ball:

- if it passes all pins on either side and hits the topea, the throw is worth five points
- if it passes through all pins without knocking down any and hits the topea, the throw is worth six points
- if it knocks over the txakina and the central pin, the throw is worth 12 points
- if it knocks over the txakina and at least one other pin, the throw is worth 11 points

There are other special throws which depend on the placement of the txakina apart from the above and some vary from area to area.

=== Oholtzar pasaboloa ===
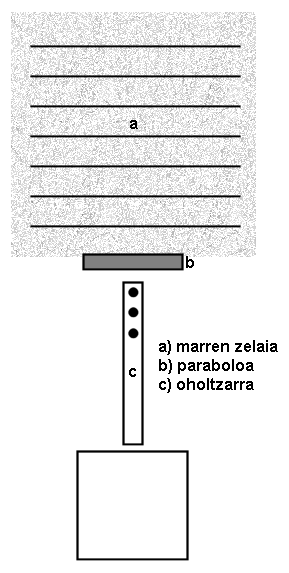
Oholtzar pasaboloa

This version is common even today in Cantabria and Biscay in the area roughly between the river Asón and the river Ibaizabal and as far south as Burgos, called pasabolo de tablón in Spanish.

There are three parts to the playing field in this game. The first is the launching area, about 6m long, where the player takes a run to launch the ball. The ball weighs 5–7 kg (11–15 lb) and has finger and hand-holes. It then travels down a shallow groove about 8 m (26 ft) long, the oholtzarra (cureño or tablón in Spanish). At the far end three light pins, weighing about 100 g (3.5 oz) each (the lightest of all pins used in Basque bowling games) which are set in holes in the ground, one behind the other. Both the oholtzarra and the pin area are kept wet in this game to minimise friction. Not far behind the pins is a barrier (called paraboloa) to stop the ball but behind the barrier the actually target area lies, the marren zelaia "field of lines" (campo de rayas in Spanish), 20 m (66 ft) wide and 40 m (130 ft) long. The lines are parallel to each other and at a distance of 5 m (16 ft) and important for scoring.

The basic aim of the game is to hit the pins with enough force to propel them over the barrier and as far into the field as possible. Skill is needed to keep the ball in the groove and hit the pins head on, otherwise they tend to go sideways rather than forward. If a pin lands in the area up to the first line, it is worth 10 points and each additional line another 10 so the maximum score per bowl is 210 points if all land past the 6th line. In a game each player has eight balls and the highest scorer wins.

=== Olazabal bowls ===
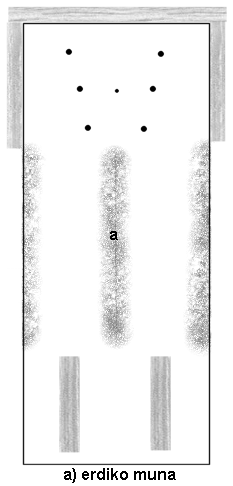
Olazabalgo bolo jokoa

Olazabalgo bolo jokoa, the game from Olazabal, a borough of the town of Dima. The game also known as Olazabalgo zazpi boloen jokoa (called juego de siete bolos de Olazabal in Spanish) - "the seven pin game from Olazabal". There is only one known bolatoki for this variant. The rules and setup resembles those of munadun erremontea somewhat and it geographically played within the same area, suggesting it may well be a variant that developed from munadun erremontea.

This dirt bolatoki is outdoors, set under trees in a park. The balls used have finger and hand-holes and usually weigh 5–6 kg (11–13 lb). There are only six large pins (36 cm (14 in) tall) and a small txirlo (26 cm (10 in) tall). The playing area is rectangular, about 20 m (66 ft) long and 4 m (13 ft) wide. The main characteristic of the playing area is that the middle part has both an erdiko muna (central muna) and sloping sides, effectively creating two parallel wide channels. The pins are set in a slightly diagonal line in groups of three, one at the other end of each "channel", the small txirlo sits in between them but there is no special platform for them as in other varieties. At the player's end there are two launching platforms, one in front of either channel.

To score, a player has to launch a ball onto the launching platform down either channel. For the throw to be valid, it also has to travel onto the muna or the left or right slope. It then knocks down pins (who in turn may knock down other pins) but also has to hit the barrier at the far end or a txorra is declared and the throw is invalid. All pins are worth only one point each.

In theory it is possible to score more than 4 points but this has not happened in living memory.

=== Tres Tablones ===
This variant is originally from the Merindades, in the north of Spain but nowadays is played in Burgos, the Basque Country, Madrid, Alicante and in some South America.

The bowling alley is divided into three differente areas: The launching area, pin area and Birle area. The bowling balls have finger and hand-holes, are 26–28 cm (10–11 in) in diameter and usually weight between 6 and 8 kg (13 and 18 lb). There are three boards (tablones or cureñas) and three pins on each one, there is a small pin which is situated outside of the boards and is the most important one.

The game starts the bowling ball being thrown from the launching area (cas) through the air, trying to bring down as many pins as possible and the small pin (the mico). The first bounce of the bowling ball must be on the board, otherwise it will be discounted (a morra). Scoring is as follows: each pin knocked down is worth one point, the middle pin knocked over on its own is worth two points, and knocking over the small pin is worth four points, only if another pin has been knocked down.

=== Zabaleko hiru txirlo ===
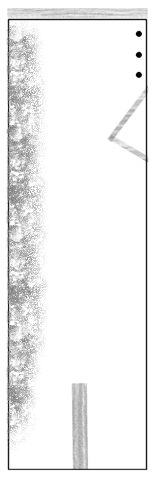
Zabaleko hiru txirlo

This three pin game is also called Berrizko hiru txirlo or hiru txirlo de Berriz in Spanish.

Most bolatoki for this variant are in the area around Berriz in Biscay, most notably the one attached to the small church (a type called baseliza in Basque) of San Lorenzo of Mendibil.

The playing area is about 18–20 m (59–66 ft) long and 1.5–2.5 m (4 ft 11 in – 8 ft 2 in) wide that consists of a slightly sunken dirt (or sand) area which uses the slope and (in most cases) a church wall as a border on one side. The wooden balls weight about 2 kg (4.4 lb) and there are only three 21 cm (8.3 in) tall pins. These are arranged in a line, one behind each other, very close to the wall.

The main characteristic of this game is a triangular barrier called motie which prevents players from bowling directly at the pins. Instead, players launch the ball onto a launching platform, aiming for the incline opposite the wall and the pins, with the intentions of letting the ball curve around and hit the pins from the side.

Each player bowls two balls and the pins are worth one point each but pins knocked over by balls rebounding off the back panel do not count.

=== Zeanuri bowls ===
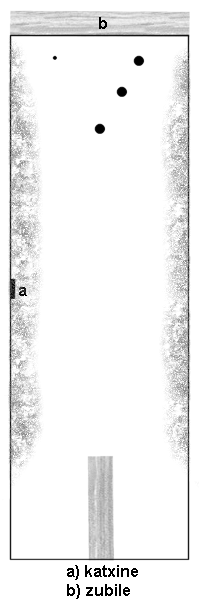
Zeanuriko bola jokoa

This variant is called Zeanuriko bola jokoa in Basque and juego de Zeanuri in Spanish and played around the area of Zeanuri in Biscay only.

Four bolatoki for this variant remain, 19–26 m (62–85 ft) in length and 2.5–3.5 m (8 ft 2 in – 11 ft 6 in) in width with a launching platform at the player's end and an end panel at the far end called zubile. Roughly half way down the playing are there is a small stake on the left slope called katxine. There are four pins, three large ones (41 cm (16 in) tall) and a small one (25 cm (9.8 in) tall), arranged in the shape of an equilateral triangle with the point towards the player, the three large pins on the side going off to the right and the small pin at the far left corner. All pins are worth one point each. The balls for this game have finger and hand-holes and weigh 7 kg (15 lb).

There are different ways of playing this game. Players either place an amount of money before the game called the arrapea and then get to bowl three balls (if played in teams, then there are three balls per team). In the other version, the arrapea is placed and each player or team has six balls but only the best throw is counted.

Players launch their balls onto the launching platform and most come off the left slope before hitting any pins but if the katxine is hit, the throw is invalid. Pins knocked over by a rebounding ball do not count but the ball must hit the zubile otherwise a txorra is declared and the throw is invalid. Scoring works as follows for valid balls:

- if only the small pin is knocked over, the throw is not worth any points
- if one of the large pins knocks over the small pin, the throw is worth four points

== History ==
The earliest historical records which mention bola jokoak are almost all records of writers complaining about the game as a sign of moral decay or administrative records of forbidding the play of such games on the streets. A law from Santander dating back to 1627 for example penalised the playing of bowls on the streets of the city, as did the council of Ulibarri-Jauregi 1632.

Probably the first document to give us a limited insight into the actual gameplay comes from the 1726 dictionary of the Real Academia de la Lengua Española which gives a very brief outline of a game very similar to bolo palma.

Up until the end of the 19th century most neighbourhoods would have a playing area where the locals would play and bet the payment of their drinks (often txakoli or cider) on their bowling skills. Due to the suspicion of the Catholic church and the nobility such activities, many bowling courts were historically located near churches.

The first over-regional competition was organised by the council of Gasteiz in 1949 with players from all over Álava competing for 3 prizes of 500 pesetas and a trophy. Competitions at all levels have been held in various places since.

== See also ==
- Basque rural sports
- Bocce
- Boccia
- Boules
- Bowling
- Bowls
- Pétanque
- Skittles
