= Basque Argentines =

Argentine citizens of Basque descent

Vascos Argentinos (Spanish) Eusko-argentinarrak (Basque)
- (Argentina) (Basque Country (autonomous community))
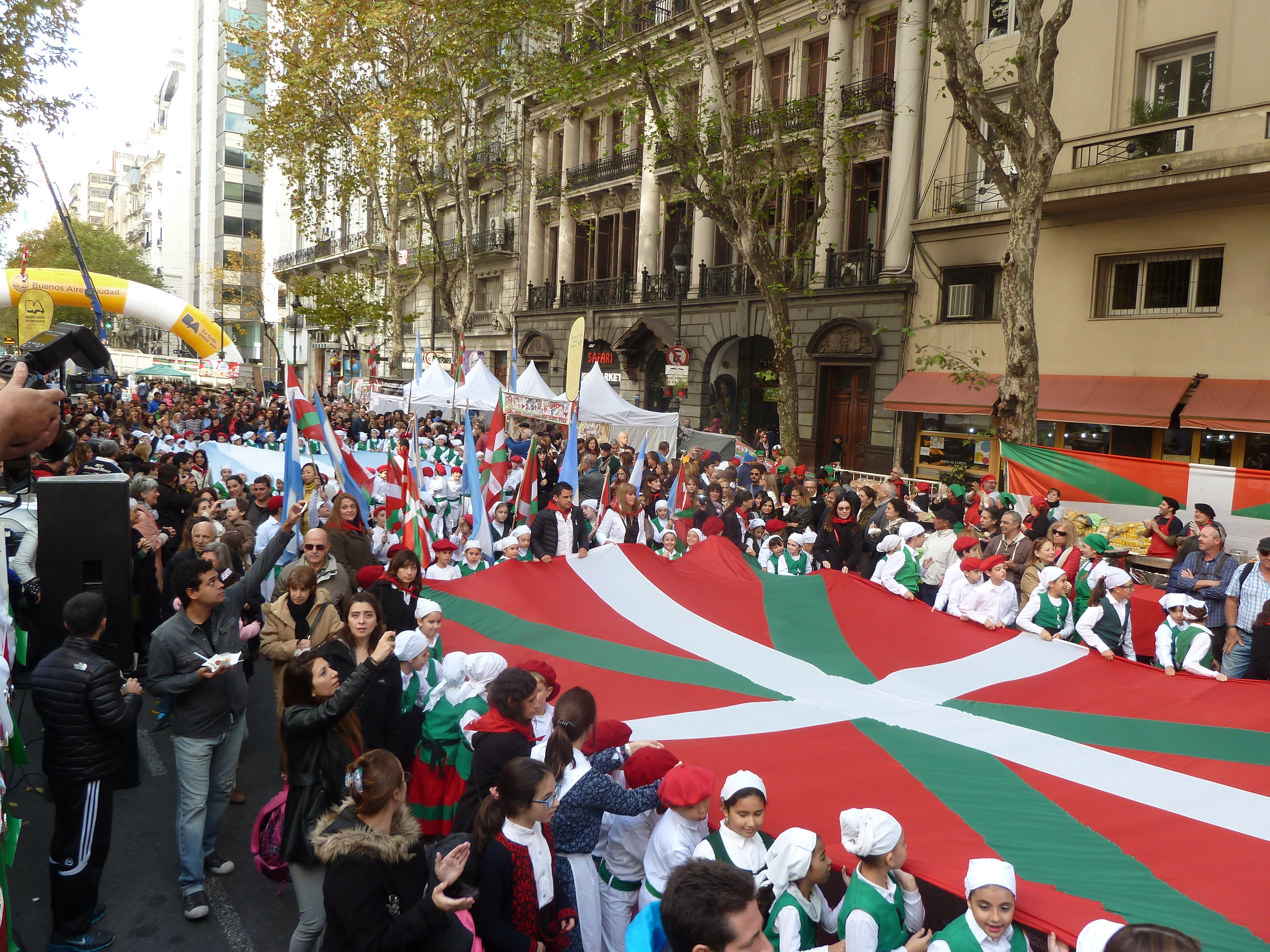
- Basque Festival in Buenos Aires

Total population
- c. 3,000,000 – 3,500,000

Regions with significant populations
- Throughout Argentina

Languages
- Predominantly in Rioplatense Spanish; Minority speak Basque and/or French

Religion
- Predominantly Roman Catholicism

Related ethnic groups
- Basques; Basque Uruguayans · Basque Americans

Basque Argentines are Argentine citizens of Basque descent or people from Basque residing in Argentina. Basque Argentines are one of the largest Basque diaspora groups in the world outside the Basque Country (Euskadi, Navarre and the French side).

Basque settlement in Argentina took place in the late 19th and early 20th centuries when many immigrants arrived in Argentina from the Basque Country. Basque people had already played a large part in the conquest and development of Argentina as a Spanish colony and in its independence, including Juan de Garay, the founder of the capital Buenos Aires.

== History ==
Between 1857 and 1940 more than 2 million Spanish people emigrated to Argentina, mostly from Galicia and the Basque Country, which is a region in the western Pyrenees mountains straddling parts of France and Spain. Both Spanish and French Basques (including Navarrans) arrived in Argentina as part of a wider Basque diaspora.

Today, around 10% of the Argentine population are of Basque descent. The destination of the majority of Basque emigrants was Argentina, with Basque culture contributing much to Argentine culture.

== Basque cultural influences ==
There are Basque cultural centres (Euskal Etxeak) in most large cities, as well as pelota courts and Basque language schools. Buenos Aires has a major Basque centre, the Laurak Bat, and a cultural foundation, the Juan de Garay Institute, named after the city's Basque founder. Politicians from the Basque Country autonomous community of Spain, including the lehendakari, are regular visitors to the country, and the Basque government has diplomatic representation in Argentina, currently María Elisa Díaz de Mendibil.

== Basque heritage ==
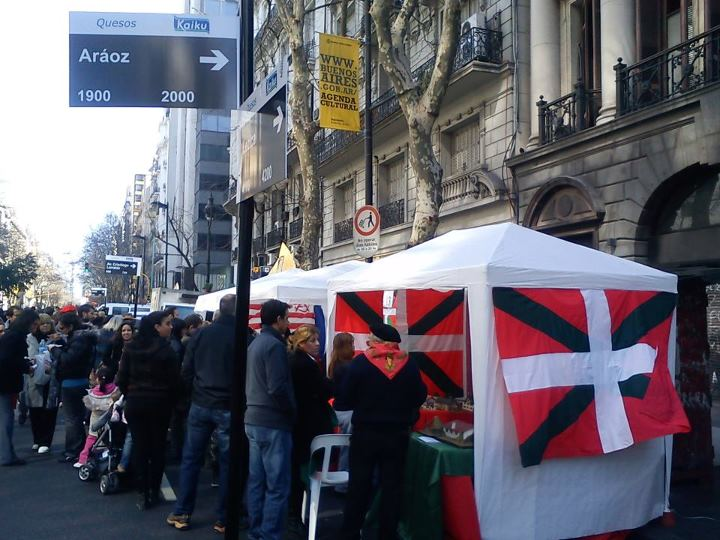
Basque festival, Buenos Aires

Many places have been given Basque names, including the city of Ezeiza and its surrounding partido, best known as the location of Argentina's main international airport, Ministro Pistarini. The seaside resort of Necochea is a major centre of Basque culture and also has a Basque name. Several Presidents of Argentina have been of Basque descent, including Justo José de Urquiza, José Evaristo Uriburu, Hipólito Yrigoyen, José Félix Uriburu and Pedro Eugenio Aramburu, not to mention other figures, notably Eva Perón, Che Guevara, Maxima Zorreguieta and well-known football players as Julio Olarticoechea, Sergio Goycochea or Gonzalo Higuaín. There are an estimated 15,000 Basque surnames in Argentina.

== Notable people ==
- Alfredo Arrieta, military and politician, brother-in-law of Juan Domingo Perón.
- Che Guevara, a major figure of the Cuban Revolution.
- Gonzalo Higuaín, professional footballer who plays for MLS club Inter Miami.
- Aníbal Ibarra, lawyer and politician who served as mayor of Buenos Aires from 2000 to 2006.
- Eva Perón, the First Lady of Argentina from 1946 until her death in 1952.
- Hipólito Yrigoyen, two-time President of Argentina.
- Maxima Zorreguieta, Queen Máxima of the Netherlands, married to King Willem-Alexander.
- Pedro Eugenio Aramburu, former President "de facto" of Argentina
- Sergio Goycochea, 1990 World Cup starting goalkeeper of Argentina
- Julio Olarticoechea, former football player
- Jorge Burruchaga, former football player
- Mauro Burruchaga, football player
- Pablo Zabaleta, football player for West Ham United.
- Gabriel Goity, Actor
- Macarena Achaga, TV personality
- Ezequiel Garay, footballer
- Magdalena Mouján, mathematician and science fiction writer
- Adolfo Zumelzú, 1928 Olympian in Argentina football team
- Olga Zubarry, actress
- Jorge Zorreguieta, Minister of Agriculture during the Videla Regime
- Héctor Zelada, 1986 World Cup Winner
- Héctor Aramburu, musician known as Atahualpa Yupanqui
- Rogelio Yrurtia, sculptor
- Bautista Ezcurra, rugby union player
- Felipe Ezcurra, rugby union player
- Nico Otamendi, footballer

== See also ==
- Immigration to Argentina
- Argentines of European descent
- Spanish Argentine
- French Argentine
