= Delika canyon =

Canyon in the Basque Country, Spain

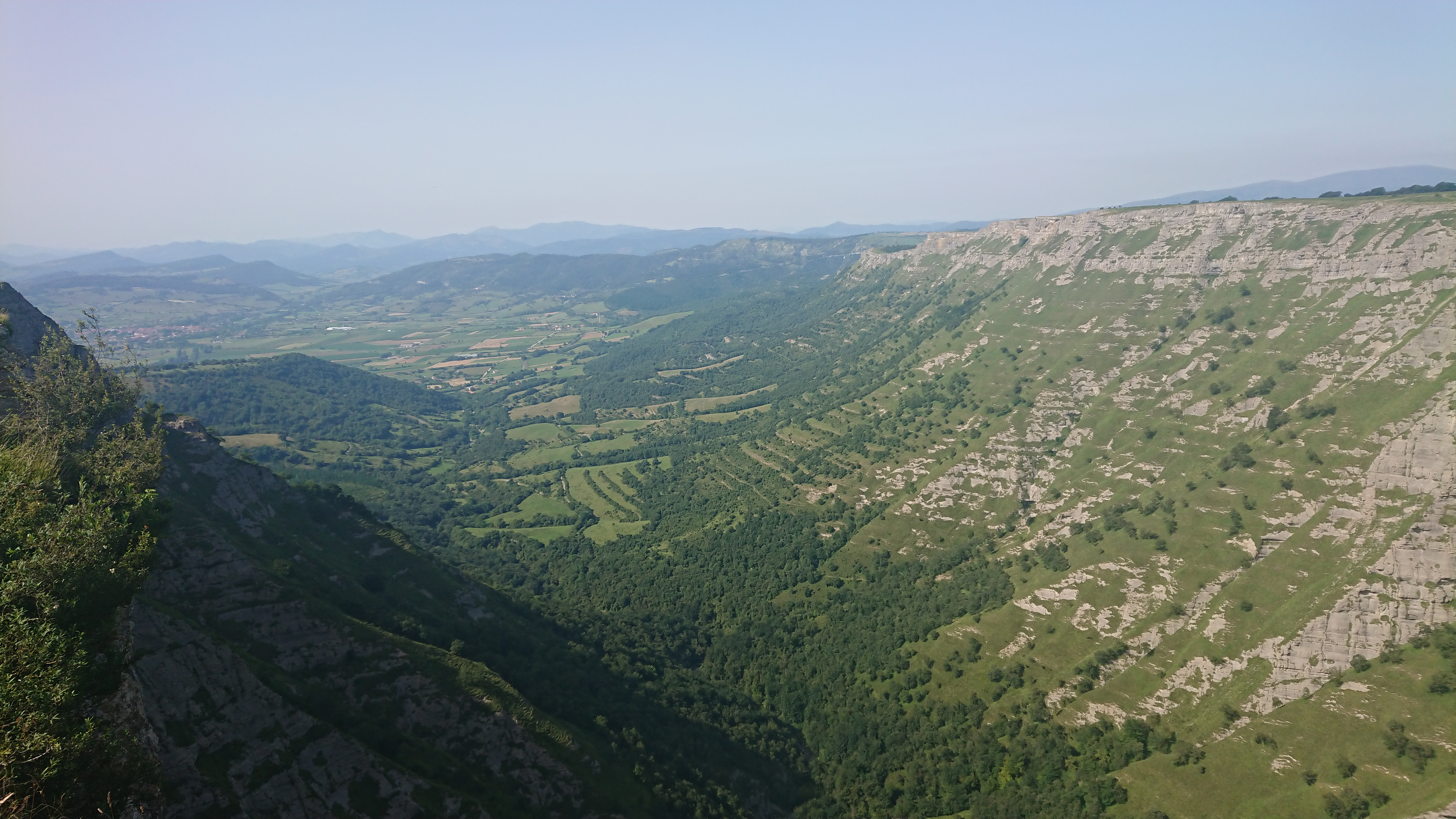
- Valley of Delika

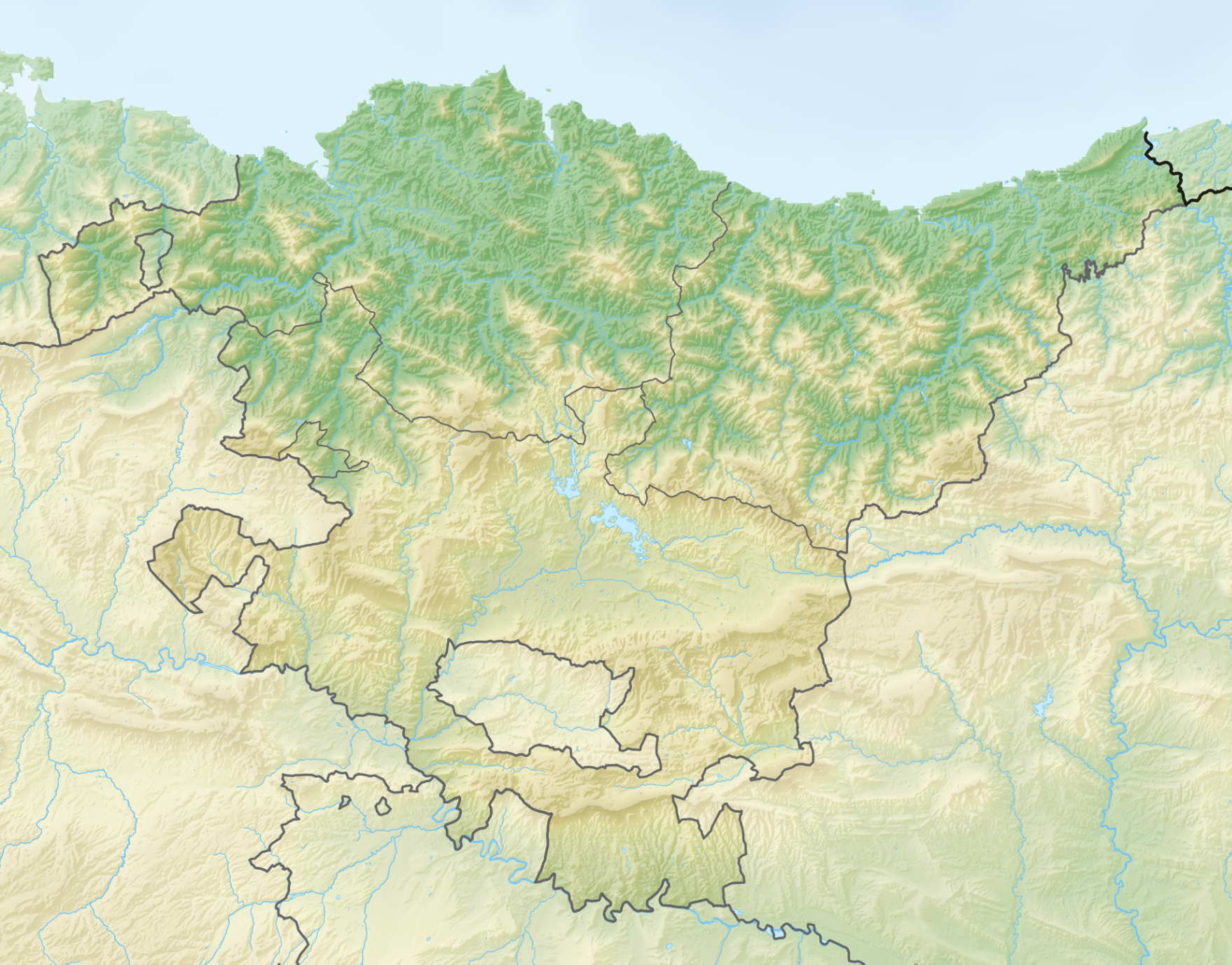
- Location within the Basque Country

Geology
- Type: Karst valley

Geography
- Location: Amurrio, Álava, Basque Country
- Country: Spain
- Coordinates: 42.942°N 2.978°W
- River: Nervión
- Interactive map of Delika canyon

The Delika canyon (Spanish: Cañón de Délica, Basque: Delikako arroila) is a karst canyon of Spain, located in the province of Álava. It is formed by the Nervión river near the village of Delika. The Salto del Nervión, an intermittent waterfall that is the highest in Spain [222 metres (728 ft)], flows from the canyon.
