= Isozaki Atea =

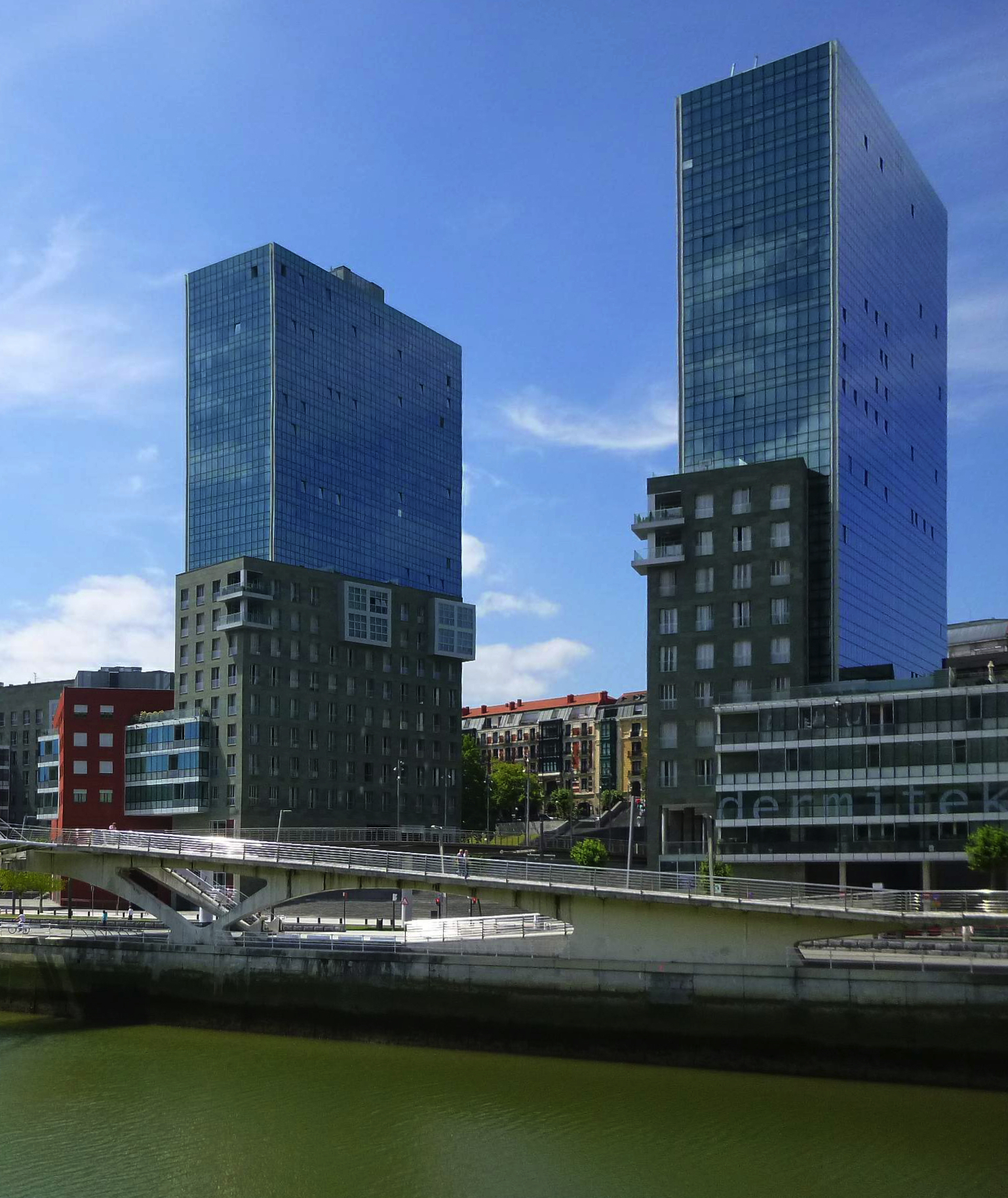
- Interactive map of the Isozaki Atea area

General information
- Location: Bilbao, Spain
- Coordinates: 43°15′57″N 2°55′44″W
- Construction started: 2004
- Completed: 2008

Height
- Roof: 83 m (272 ft)

Technical details
- Floor count: 22 (4 basement floors)
- Lifts/elevators: 6

Design and construction
- Architects: Arata Isozaki, Iñaki Aurrekoetxea
- Main contractor: Fincas Abando

The Isozaki Atea (Basque: Isozaki Gate) twin towers in Bilbao, Spain are the tallest residential buildings in the city and the Basque Country, designed by Japanese architect Arata Isozaki. The towers are 83 metres (272 ft) tall and have 23 floors. The first two floors are used for mixed-commercial purposes, and the remaining floors are residential. The towers are part of a five-building complex. The other three buildings' heights range between six and eight floors.

"Atea" means "gate" in Basque; the complex is intended as the entrance to the Ensanche of the city from the other side of the Nervión river as a footway directly connects the staircase between the two towers to the Zubizuri footbridge. The staircase leads to Ercilla Street.
