= Mendívil =

Mendívil or Mendivil may refer to:

== People ==
- Benjamín Mora Mendívil (b. 1979), Mexican football manager and coach
- Fernando de Santiago y Díaz de Mendívil (1910–1994), Spanish general and politician
- Gustavo Mendívil Amparán (b. 1960), Mexican politician
- Johan Mendívil (b. 1994), Mexican footballer
- José Antonio León Mendivil (b. 1946), Mexican politician
- José María Tornel y Mendívil (1795–1853), Mexican general, attorney, and politician
- Manuel Mendívil (1935–2015), Mexican equestrian
- Manuel de Mendívil y Elío (1874–1942), Spanish writer, naval officer, and colonial administrator
- María Concepción Mendívil Feito (b. 1981), Spanish singer-songwriter known professionally as Conchita
- Mario Arana Mendívil (1884–1931), Spanish politician
- Soraya Jiménez Mendívil (1977–2013), Mexican weightlifter
- Ulises Mendívil (b. 1980), Mexican footballer
- Yusseli Mendivil (b. 1991), Mexican racing cyclist

== Places ==
- Mendibil, Álava, a hamlet in the Basque Country of Spain also referred to as "Mendívil"

== See also ==
- Mendibil, a similar surname
- Coronel FAP Alfredo Mendívil Duarte Airport, an airport serving Ayacucho, Peru
- José Castro Mendivil Digital Planetarium, a planetarium in Lima, Peru
