= Zubizuri =

Footbridge over the Nervion River in Bilbao

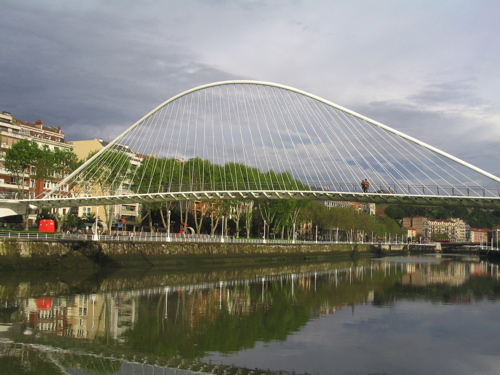
- River Nervion with Zubizuri Footbridge from Uribitarte.
- Coordinates: 43°15′59″N 2°55′41″W
- Locale: Bilbao, Spain
- Other name(s): Campo Volantin Bridge, Puente del Camp Volantin
- Owner: City of Bilbao

History
- Architect: Santiago Calatrava
- Opened: 1997

Location
- Interactive map of Zubizuri

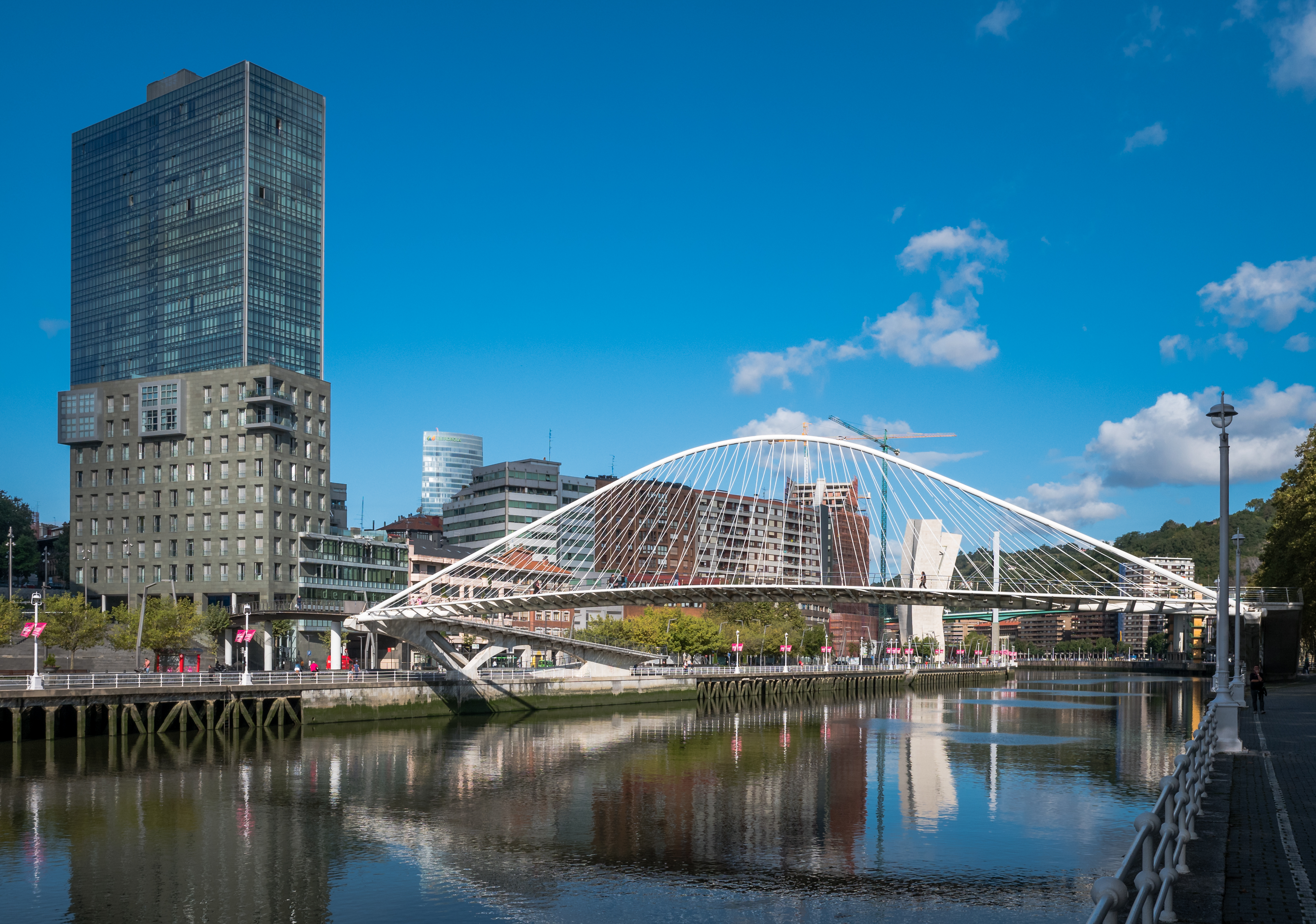
View from the opposite shore.

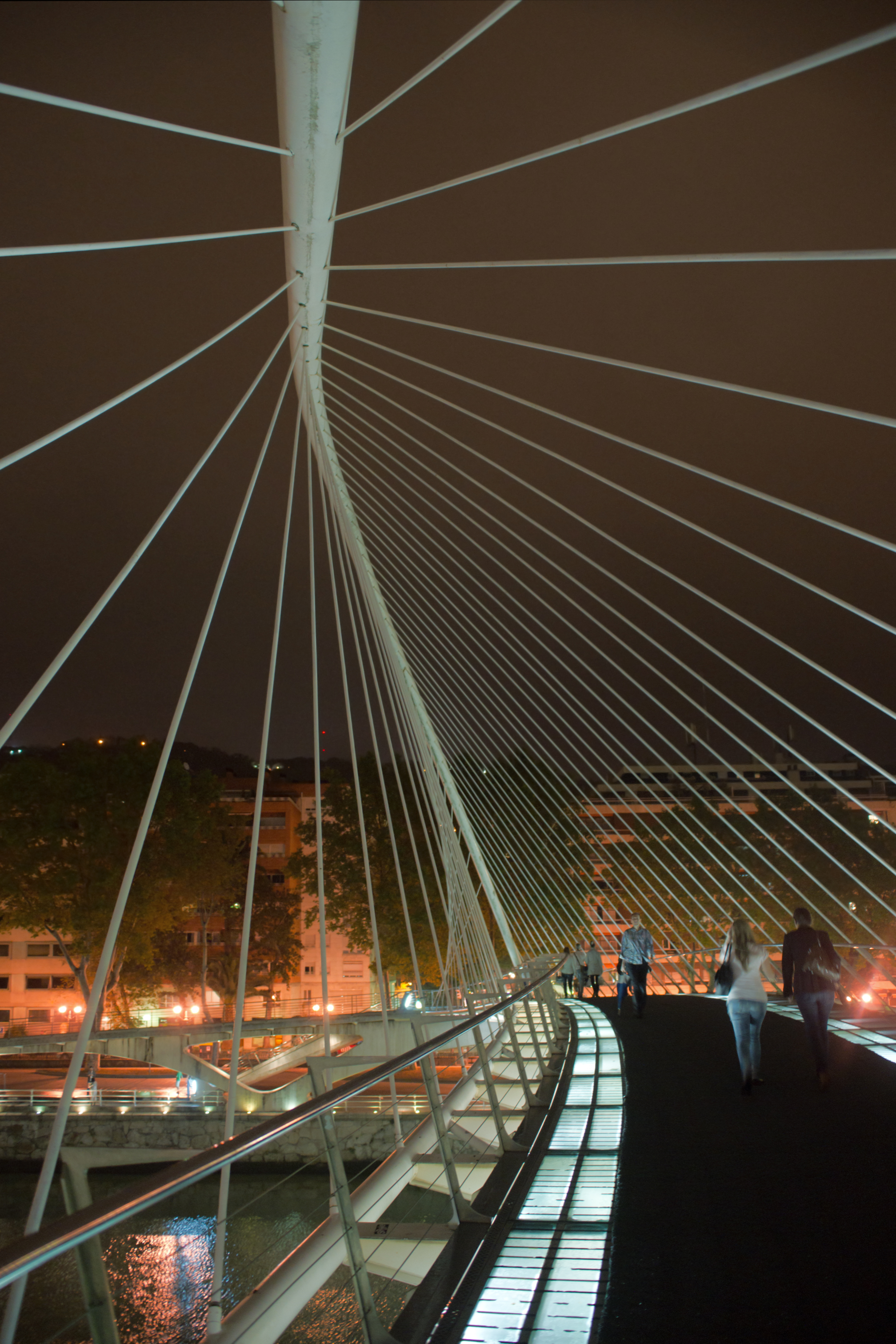
View by night

The Zubizuri (Basque for "white bridge"), also called the Campo Volantin Bridge or Puente del Campo Volantin, is a tied arch footbridge across the Nervión River in Bilbao, Spain. Designed by architect Santiago Calatrava, the bridge links the Campo Volantin right bank and Uribitarte left bank of the river.

== Description ==
Opened in 1997, the bridge's unusual design consists of a curved walkway which is supported by steel suspension cables from an overhead arch. The structure of the bridge is painted white and the bridge deck consists of translucent glass bricks. Access ramps and stairways are located on both banks.

The Zubizuri offers pedestrians a convenient route from hotels to the nearby Bilbao Guggenheim Museum.

== Criticism ==
=== Published criticism ===
Since its opening, it has been subjected to praise as a symbol of the new Bilbao and as a draw for tourism. Architectural professor Alexander Tzonis wrote:

"The intelligence, vitality, and originality of the bridge's curved configuration challenged the ordinariness and slow decline of the urban setting, bringing a message of hope and an invitation to imagine better conditions."

However, other professionals have been more equivocal, bridge engineer Matthew Wells saying:

"Regrettably, the balance of light steel superstructure on the cantilevered abutment ends is strained, like a sculptural toy, and the bridge touches the ground uncomfortably."

=== History since opening ===
The bridge has also been accused of impracticality: it is locally infamous for the glass bricks set into its floor, which can become slippery in the wet climate of the city.

The original design connects the bridge on the left bank to the Uribitarte dock and not to the higher street Alameda Mazarredo. Local authorities temporarily installed a further scaffolding footway joining the bridge and Mazarredo street, but removed it under protest from Calatrava.

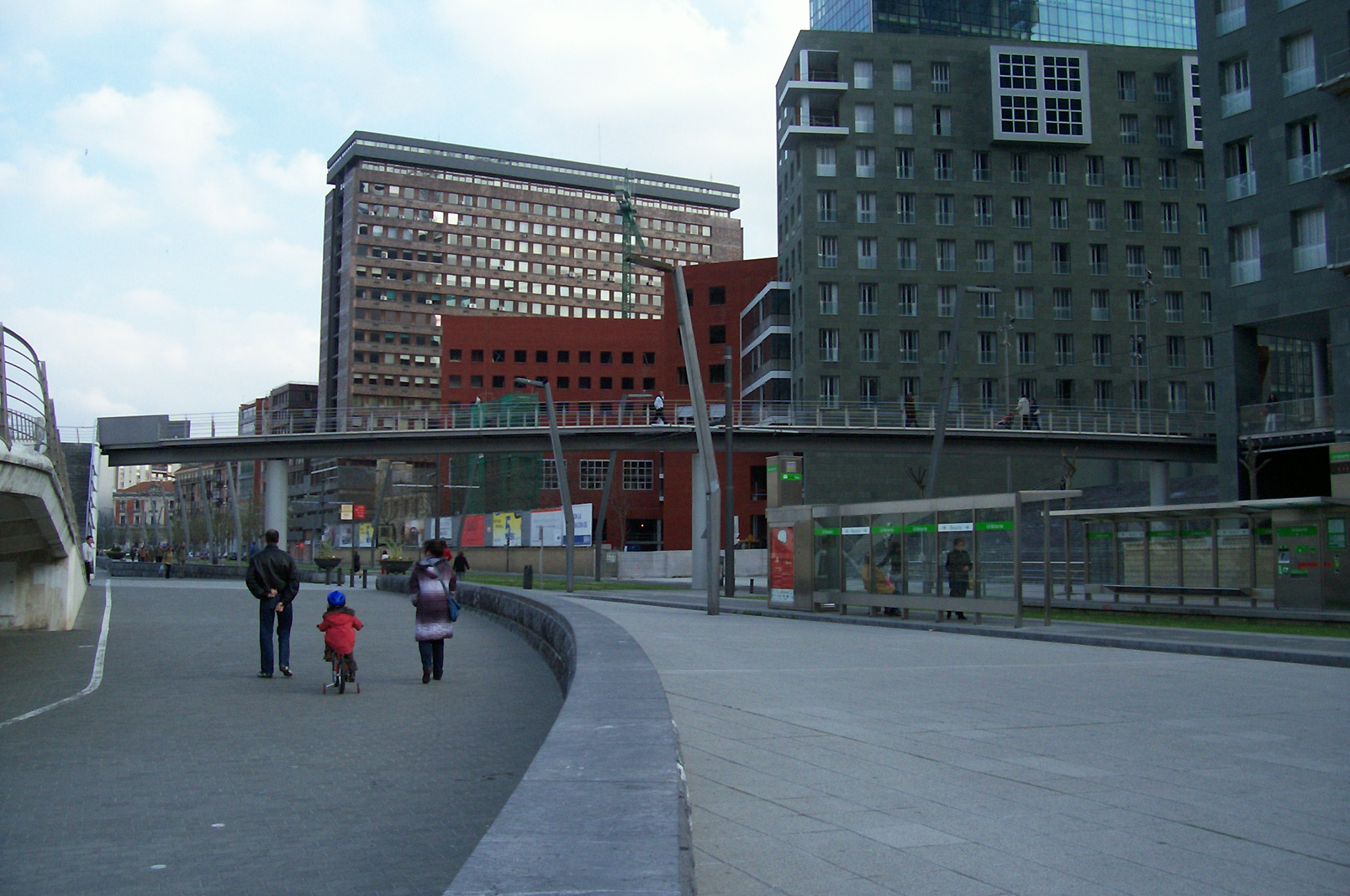
Isozaki footway, installed next to Zubizuri.

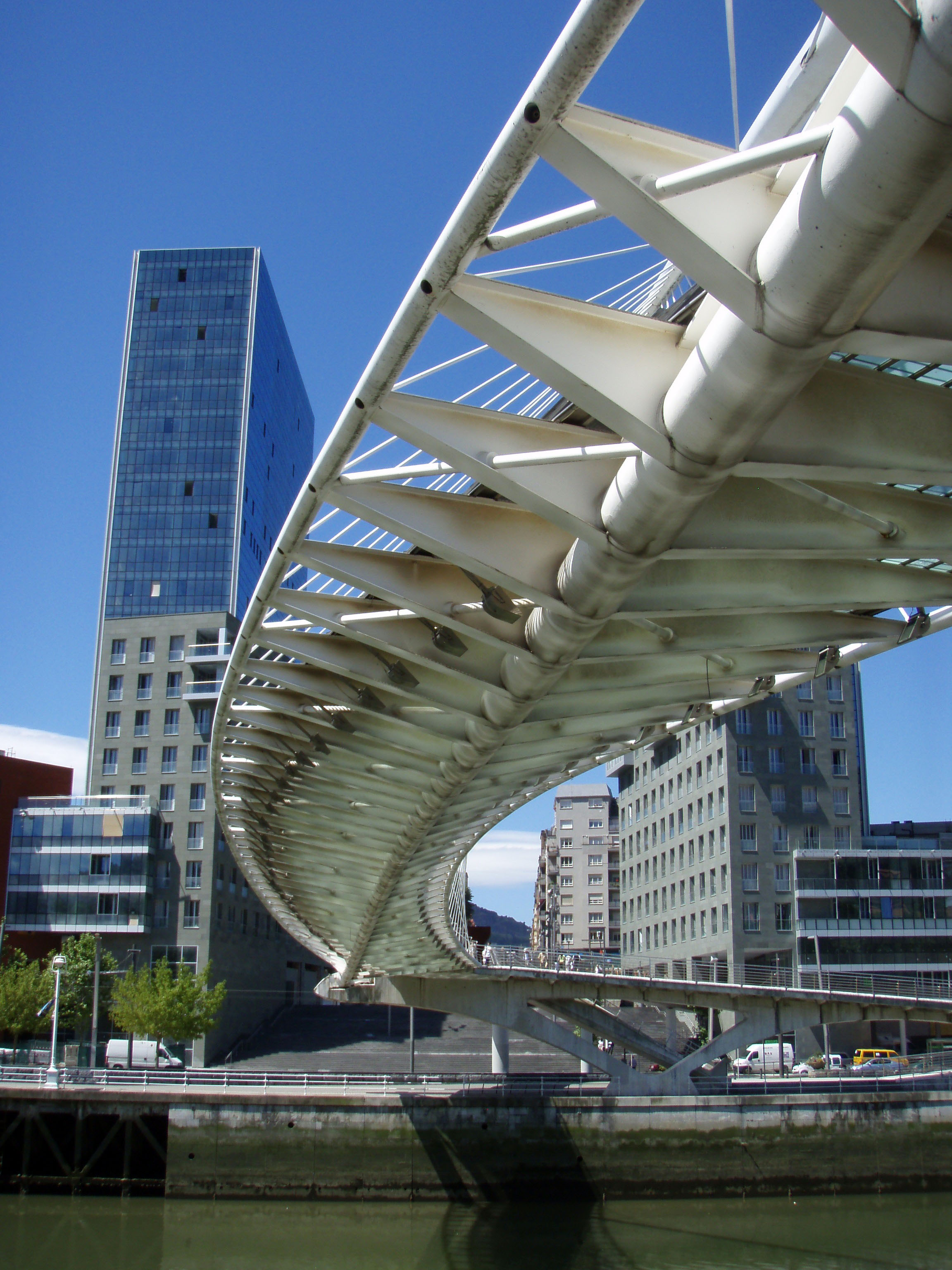
The bridge from below.

In 2006, the local authorities authorized Arata Isozaki to erect a new footway from the bridge to the construction site of the Isozaki Atea towers. Calatrava responded in 2007 by suing Bilbao for the moral rights to the integrity of his creation (a part of the intellectual property under the Spanish copyright law), where a metal bar had been cut. The mayor of Bilbao, Iñaki Azkuna, with the support of his fellow councilors claimed that the rights of the owners (Bilbao) took precedence over the architect's rights. He also noted the slips and falls of bridge users, and the cost of replacing broken glass tiles (6,000 euros a year according to opposition speaker Antonio Basagoiti, 250,000 euros in ten years according to a municipal report). Jurists and local architects have supported the position of the mayor, holding that the modifications do not affect Calatrava's rights.

In November 2007, a judge agreed that there was damage to the creator's moral rights but favored the local council and allowed Isozaki's connection to remain. Calatrava announced his intention to appeal against the decision. In March 2009, a higher court granted 30,000 euros to Calatrava as damages.

== See also ==
- List of bridges in Spain
