= Delika =

Hamlet in Álava, Spain

- Concejo
- Location within Álava Location within the Basque Country Location within Spain
- Coordinates: 42°58′10″N 2°59′18″W
- Country: Spain
- Autonomous community: Basque Country
- Province: Álava
- Comarca: Ayala
- Municipality: Amurrio

Area
  - Total: 13.64 km^{2} (5.27 sq mi)
- Elevation: 341 m (1,119 ft)

Population (2022)
  - Total: 152
  - Density: 11.1/km^{2} (28.9/sq mi)
- Postal code: 01468

Delika (Spanish: Délica) is a village and concejo in the municipality of Amurrio, in Álava province, Basque Country, Spain. The Delika canyon is located south of the village.
