= Nervión Waterfall =

Highest waterfall in the Iberian Peninsula, located in Alafva, Sapain

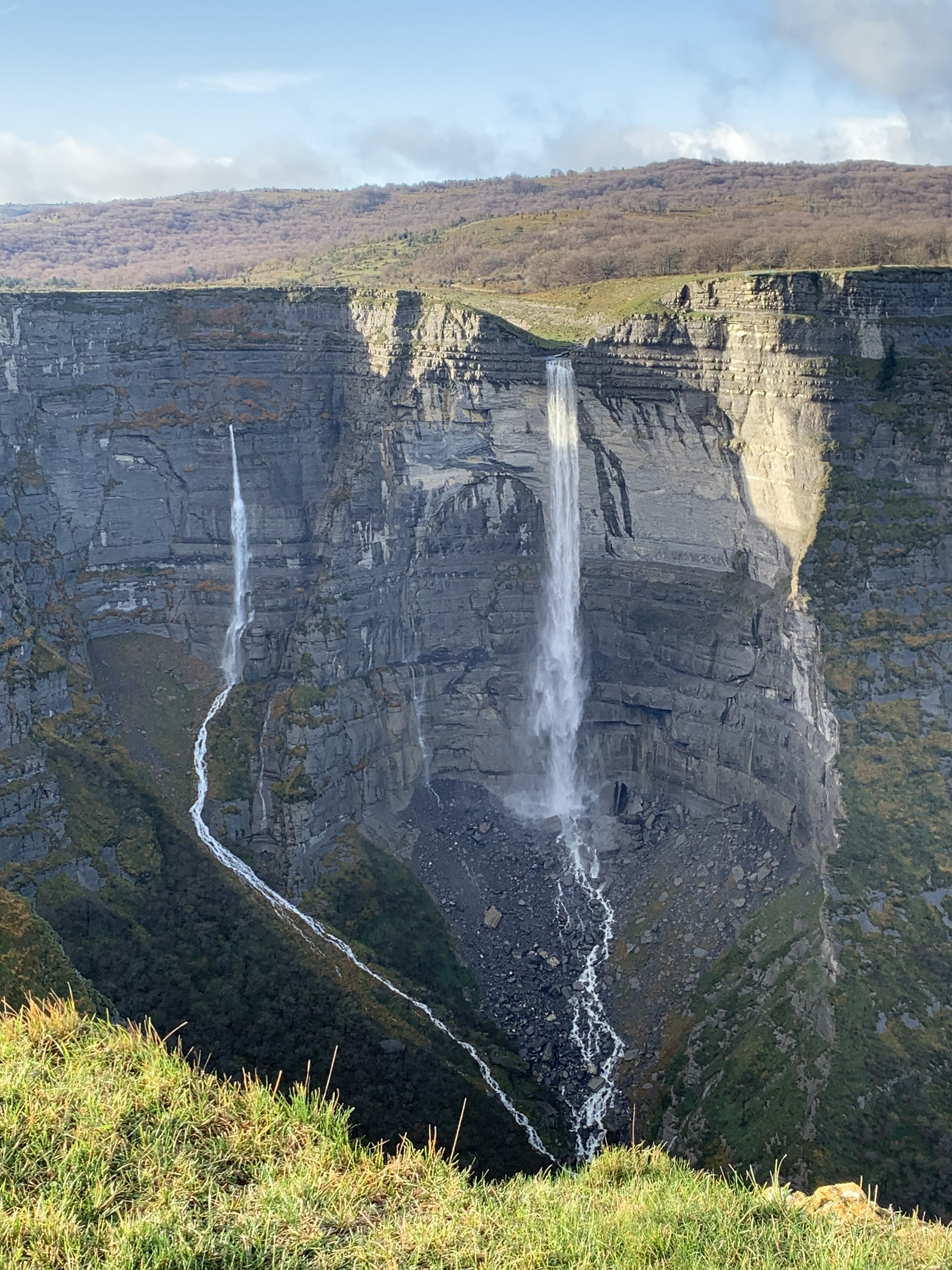
- Salto del Nervión from Monte Santiago viewpoint in Burgos

- Location within Spain
- Location: Amurrio and Cuartango, Álava, Basque Country, Spain
- Coordinates: 43.0975°N 3.0283°W
- Total height: 220
- Watercourse: Nervión River

The Nervión Waterfall (Spanish: Salto del Nervión, Basque: Delikako ur-jauzia) is a waterfall located on the boundary between the municipalities of Amurrio and Cuartango, in the province of Álava, which is part of the autonomous community of the Basque Country. With a height of approximately 220 meters, it is considered the tallest waterfall in the Iberian Peninsula.

== Characteristics ==
The waterfall is formed by the vertical drop of the Nervión River over the edge of the Delika Canyon, a karst depression created by water erosion on limestone rock. The water flow is seasonal; the waterfall may dry up entirely during the summer and parts of the autumn, being most spectacular during rainy periods or snowmelt.

== Geological significance ==
The area is officially recognized as a Geological Site of Interest (LIG) under code PV069, due to the importance of its structural formations such as folds, faults, and karstic features, as well as its notable geomorphology.

This Geological Site of Interest covers land belonging to the Álava municipalities of Amurrio, Cuartango, and Urcabustaiz.

== Access ==
Although the waterfall is entirely located in Álava, the most common and frequented access is from the province of Burgos, through the Monte Santiago Natural Monument, which includes the main viewpoint from which the entire waterfall can be observed.

It is also possible to access the area from the Álava side via marked trails, although these are less known, especially from areas near Orduña and rural paths in the Ayala region.
