= Zollo =

Zollo is a surname. Notable people with the surname include:

- Carmel Zollo (born 1952), Australian politician
- Frederick Zollo (born 1953), American producer and director of both film and theatre
- Paul Zollo (born 1958), American singer, songwriter, author, journalist and photographer
