= Nervión =

River in Spain

Coordinates: 43°19′31.82″N 3°01′09.74″W

Nervión Basque: Nerbioi
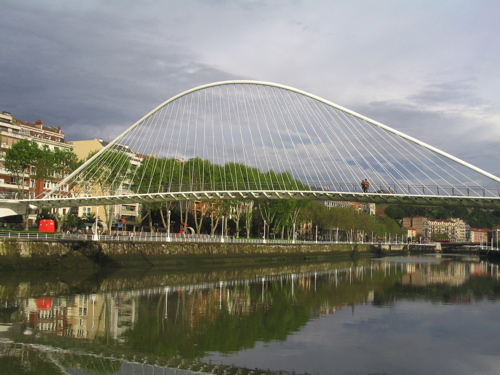
- River Nervion with Zubizuri footbridge.

Location
- Country: Spain
- Region: Basque Country
- District: Álava, Biscay
- City: Bilbao

Physical characteristics
- Source: Delika Canyon
  - location: Sierra Salbada, Álava, Spain
  - elevation: 1,000 m (3,300 ft)
- Mouth: Estuary of Bilbao
  - location: Bay of Biscay between Portugalete and Getxo, Spain
  - elevation: 0 m (0 ft)
- Length: 72 km (45 mi)
- Basin size: 1,900 km^{2} (730 sq mi)
- Discharge
  - location: Portugalete and Getxo
  - average: 9.6 m^{3}/s (340 cu ft/s)

Basin features
- Tributaries
  - left: Kadagua, Galindo
  - right: Altube, Ibaizabal, Asua

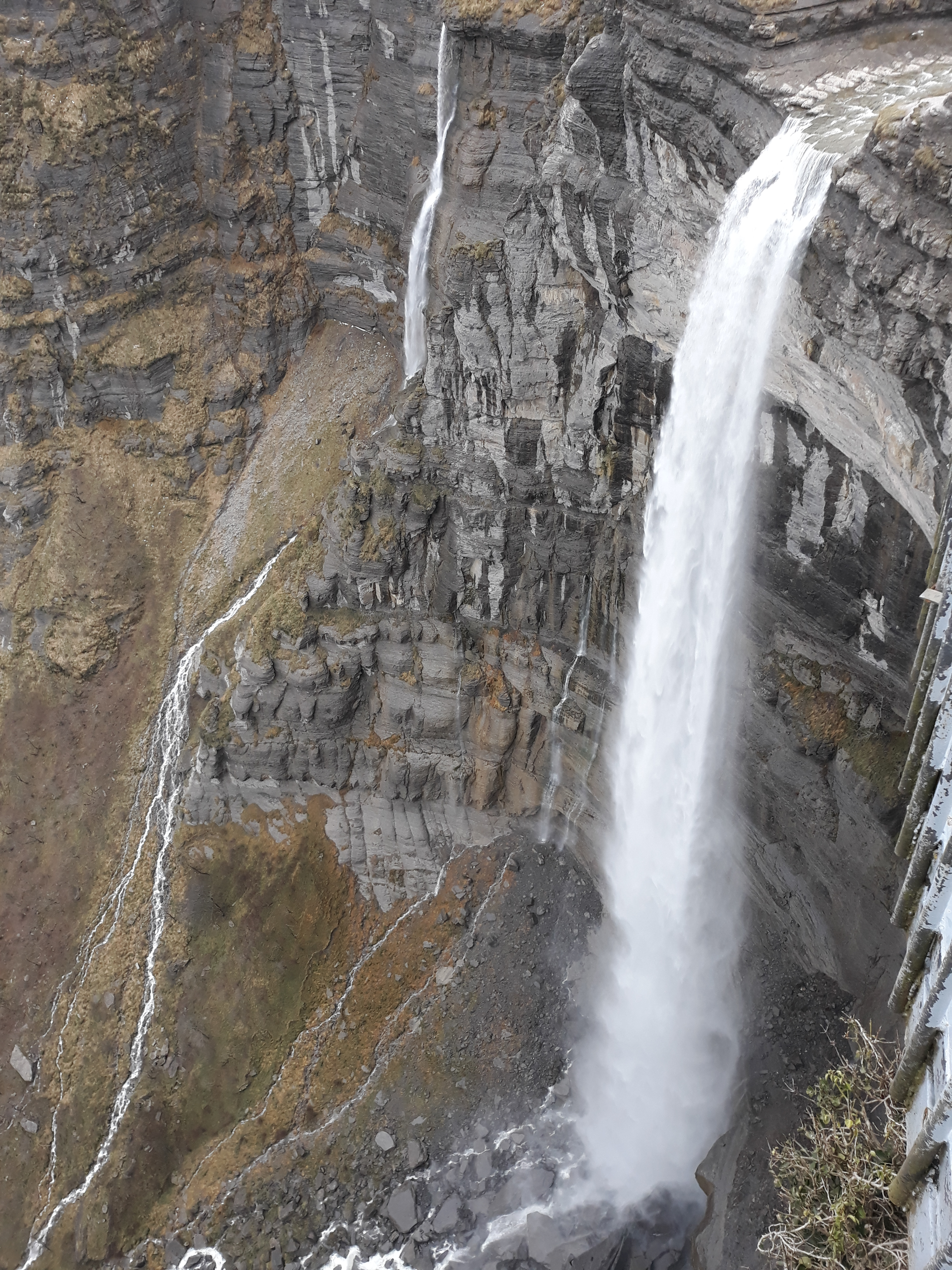
Delika canyon and waterfall.

Nervión (Spanish pronunciation: [neɾˈβjon]; Basque: Nerbioi) is a river that runs through the town of Bilbao, Spain into the Cantabrian Sea (Bay of Biscay). Its lowermost course, downstream of its confluence with the Ibaizabal River, is known as the Estuary of Bilbao.

== Geography ==
The river is 72 kilometres (45 mi) long from its source at the Burgos and Alava provincial limits to the sea and runs in a South to North direction. Soon after its source, the river forms the Nervión Waterfall a spectacular 300-metre (980 ft) waterfall in the Delika canyon (Alava) and then enters the Biscay province through the city of Orduña. This waterfall is the largest in Spain with its 222 metres. It re-enters Alava through the towns of Amurrio and Llodio. The river then runs back into Biscay province and out to the Cantabrian sea, entering the Bilbao metropolitan area at Ugao-Miraballes. The tidal influence reaches 15 kilometres (9 mi) inland from the sea, in Bilbao's old town.

The main tributaries are:

- From the west: Cadagua and Galindo.
- From the east: Arratia, Ibaizabal and Asua.

The Ibaizabal is considered by some to be an equally important river, so the whole system is often called Nervión-Ibaizabal and the final tract just "Estuary of Bilbao". The basin area is 1,900 square kilometres (730 mi^{2}).

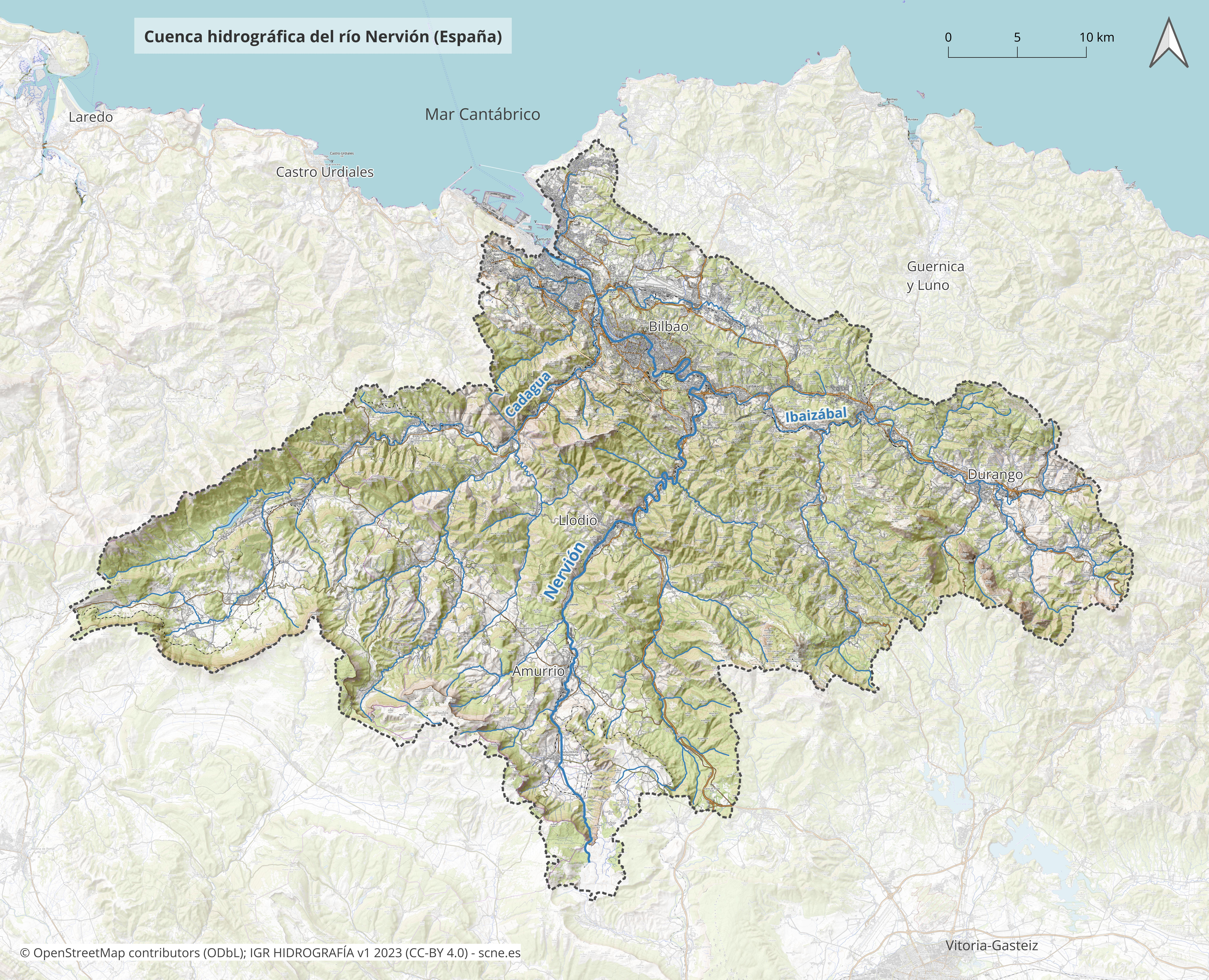
Nervión river drainage basin

=== Naming ===
Despite its current popularity in Spanish, the traditional name of the stretch between the estuary and Basauri, where the Ibaizabal and Nervión merge, is Ibaizabal (meaning 'wide river' in Basque), according to historical evidence traced from the eleventh century up to the twentieth.

Charles Frederick Henningsen, who travelled across the Basque Country during the First Carlist War, calls the river in Bilbao the Ibaizabal. The literary writer from Bilbao Miguel de Unamuno (1864–1936) as well as former mayor of Bilbao Javier Ybarra (1913–1977) refer to it as the Ibaizabal. Geological and hydrological data also seem to support this assumption.

== History and economy ==
Since ancient times, the Orduña pass that links Spain's inner plateau with the Nervión valley has had a great economic impact. During the Middle Ages it served as a natural border between the Biscay lordship and Castile counties, and tolls were collected there. Through the centuries, the Nervión valley was a vital communication corridor for Biscay, and the main rail line from Bilbao to the rest of Spain was constructed following the river in 1870.

At the same time, Bilbao developed great commercial activity, with its seaport being the most important on the north coast of Spain. The port's activity relied totally on the navigability of the river in its final 15 kilometres (9 mi). Engineer Evaristo Churruca developed an enormous project that would solve the traditional navigation problems of the river. The estuary divided the population of Greater Bilbao; the Left Bank was occupied by factories (steel, smelting and shipbuilding) and their workers, the Right Bank was a residential area for the factory owners.

Now that the River Nervión has lost economic importance, the navigable part of the river is being abandoned in favour of the sea port, to allow urban development to take place on the banks of the river after the withdrawal of heavy industry.

The quality of the water has improved through sanitization projects on the river and the disappearance of the most polluting industries.

== Environment ==
After a century of intense industrial activity the river, especially the final 25 kilometres (16 mi), was ecologically dead with oxygen levels 20 percent below the norm. This made the Nervión one of the most polluted rivers in the world. In 1990 the local authorities launched a plan to overcome this situation, resulting in a constant improvement of the environmental status that after 15 years has transformed the Nervión in to a clean river, full of aquatic life.

== See also ==
- List of rivers of Spain
