= Mendibil =

Mendibil is a Spanish surname. Notable people with the surname include:

- José María Ortiz de Mendíbil (1926–2015), Spanish football referee
- María Elisa Díaz de Mendibil, Spanish politician
- Unai Simón Mendibil (born 1997), Spanish footballer

== See also ==
- Mendibil, Álava
