= María Elisa Díaz de Mendibil =

Spanish diplomat

María Elisa Díaz de Mendibil Gómez de Segura is the representative of the government of the Basque Country Autonomous Community of Spain in Argentina.

== Biography ==
Born in Vitoria-Gasteiz, Díaz de Mendibil studied social work at the Universidad del País Vasco and worked as an event organiser and social worker with children, women and social exclusion. She served as a town councillor in Vitoria-Gasteiz.

In September 2003, she was appointed as Director of Consumption of the Basque Country Autonomous Community. In 2005, it was announced that she had been appointed to the new position of Delegate of the Basque Country Autonomous Community to Argentina, following approval by the Argentine and Basque governments. Delegates have also been appointed to Madrid, Brussels, Mexico, Venezuela and Chile. She will be based in the Basque-Argentine Institute of Co-operation and Development in Buenos Aires until a new building is found in the city.
