= History of Pamplona =

History of Pamplona, city in Spain

Flag of Pamplona used before 1923 (Note: This composition has been used for a long time in the flag of Pamplona, although it seems that, originally, the first color used was the current one, green. «However, it is recorded that the first two flags that are known were green, as stated in the first book of conference proceedings of the Pamplona regiment, which says that on 13 June 1560 was made "a new taffeta flag with green field and a lion on it with crown and chain and golden border in the manner as the other old flag", thus also confirming that the previous one was of the same green color.» Vid. Andueza Pérez, Alicia (September 2022). "The piece of the month of September 2022: FLAG OF THE CITY COUNCIL OF PAMPLONA". Chair of Heritage and Art in Navarre.)

The history of Pamplona as a city goes back to the 1st millennium B.C. when a settlement of Vascones named Iruña existed. However, traces of human occupation of the area date back 75,000 years. In the Roman era, the Vascones settlement was converted into a Roman city by General Pompey, who began by setting up a military camp there in 74 B.C., which he named Pompelo.

The Romans were followed by the Visigoths, the Muslims of Al-Andalus, and, briefly and intermittently between 778 and 816, the Carolingians. In the early 9th century, the Kingdom of Navarre was founded, an autonomous Christian principality vassal of the Caliphate of Cordoba. The Kingdom of Navarre became a fully independent kingdom in 905 and, under the reign of Sancho III of Pamplona, became the most powerful Christian state on the Iberian Peninsula in the 11th century. In 1164 the name "Kingdom of Navarre" was definitively abandoned and renamed the Kingdom of Navarre, a name that had been used before.

Pendulum of Pamplona, as described in the Privilege of the Union, the law of Carlos III that united the city on 8 September 1423 and established the respective privileges

The wars with neighboring states, frequent especially in the 10th and 11th centuries, were added to the internal conflicts in Pamplona, more serious in the 13th century, but which would only end in 1423 (Privilege of the Union). Until this year, Pamplona was not exactly a single city but a set of autonomous boroughs that were separated by walls to protect themselves from the wars that broke out between them. In 1276 one of the boroughs was destroyed, and its population massacred.

In the second half of the 15th century, Pamplona found itself involved in the Navarrese Civil War, a long-running dispute between successive claimants to the throne of Navarre. The civil war would eventually herald the annexation of Navarre by the newly united kingdoms of Castile and Aragon, which formally occurred on 7 July 1515, three years after Pamplona's surrender to the invading Castilian troops.

After the French Revolution, during the War of the Pyrenees, Pamplona was besieged by French forces in 1794, who were unable to enter the city. Between 1808 and 1813 the city was occupied by Napoleon Bonaparte's troops. The city was involved in the Carlist Wars that marked the 19th century and was the stage for a popular movement in defense of the fueros (forals) that became known as the "Gamazada".

Despite the victory of the Republicans and leftists in the municipal elections that led to the Second Spanish Republic, Pamplona was controlled by the Francoist forces from the first day of the civil war, which did not save it from facing hundreds of shootings of Republicans, which continued beyond the end of the war. During Francoism, the city was transformed from a rural town with only craft industries to an industrial city, and its population more than tripled. Because of the region's loyalty to the Francoist cause during the war, Navarre was the only historic Spanish region to retain its autonomy during Francoism, but at the same time, it was one of the areas with the most trade union conflict in all of Spain, having been the site of several strikes, the first of which was in 1951.

The transition from Francoism to democracy was felt intensely in Pamplona. In this period riots in the streets of Pamplona were frequent, some of them quite violent. Although during the first phase of the transition there were no attacks by the Basque terrorist and separatist movement ETA, the same did not happen in the following phases, and Pamplona witnessed several terrorist attacks.

== From Prehistory to the Roman Era ==
Political map of the Basque region in the 1st century BC, before the arrival of the Romans.

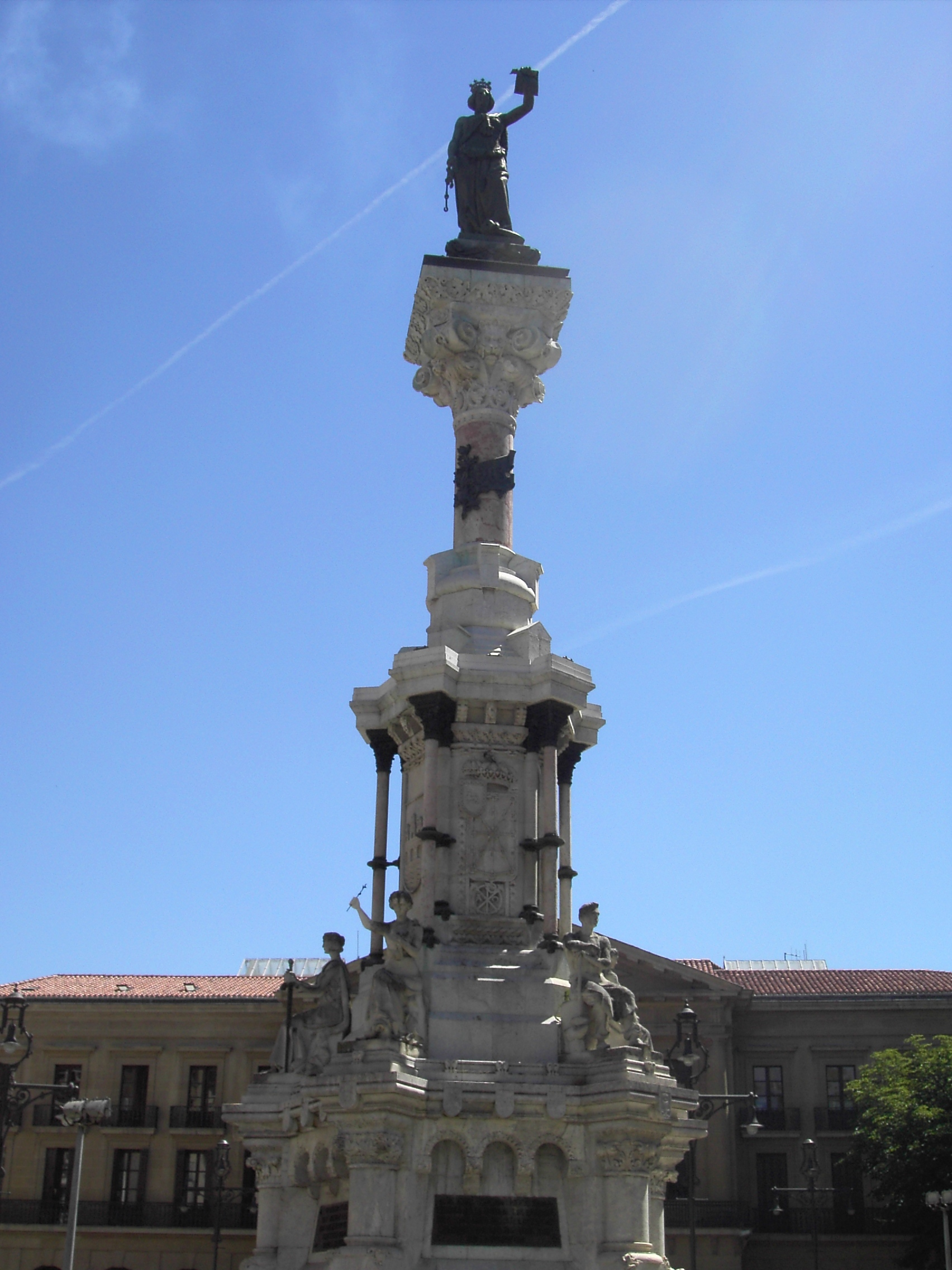
Monument to the Forals of Navarre, erected by public demand to commemorate the 19th century popular movement in defense of Navarre's fiscal autonomy that became known as Gamazada. It was completed in 1903.

The conditions of the Pamplona basin (cuenca) have favored human settlement since ancient times. The finds of lithic industry (stone tools) in the lands bordering the Arga River show that human occupation in what is now the city dates back 75,000 years. During excavations in Castle Square, a menhir was found that could not be dated.

In the first millennium B.C., there was a settlement of Vascones where the city is today, which was called Iruña. Pamplona is also identified as the capital of the Vascones, which is referred to in historical documents as Bengoda. The Basque territory minted its coins, on the back side of which appeared the legend Bascunes or Barscunes, and on the front side, although not always, the legend Bengoda, which according to historian and numismatist Antonio Beltrán Martínez corresponded to the mint and capital of the Basques. Chronologically the coins could be from the second half of the 2nd or 1st century BC.

The Basque name Iruña may originate from the term hiri (town or village). The villages with hiri in their name were founded for strategic or commercial reasons and ended up being regional reference centers, so they were "the city" for the local people. According to others, the name Iruña may be related to the river Runa, now called Arga.

In the Roman era, the village of Iruñea became a city with the foundation of "Pompelo" by the Roman general Pompey in the year 74 B.C., who established there a military camp that in time would become the city of Pamplona. Pompelo, named after its founder, was nothing more than a small civitas built by legionaries, where the Vascones of the ancient village settled. The defense of the city was relatively simple, being located at some altitude and protected by the Arga River, walling one of the flanks sufficed. In almost all areas near the river, some woods or bushes ensured the livelihood of livestock, wood supply, and fruit. The part closest to the walls contained the buildings, with the forum in the center and a street leading to the wall, where a door opened towards the area of the Ebro Valley. The agricultural fields were located outside the city and next to the river. There may have been a vassal-like relationship between Pompey and some Vascone chief, possibly before the foundation of the Roman city, namely because it is known that Roman citizenship was granted to nine people from the Vascone city of Ejea by Gnaeus Pompeius Strabo, Pompey's father, in the year 90 BC, in reward for the support in the Battle of Asculum, in Picenum, during the Social War. Later the city acquires greater importance, as Strabo mentions:

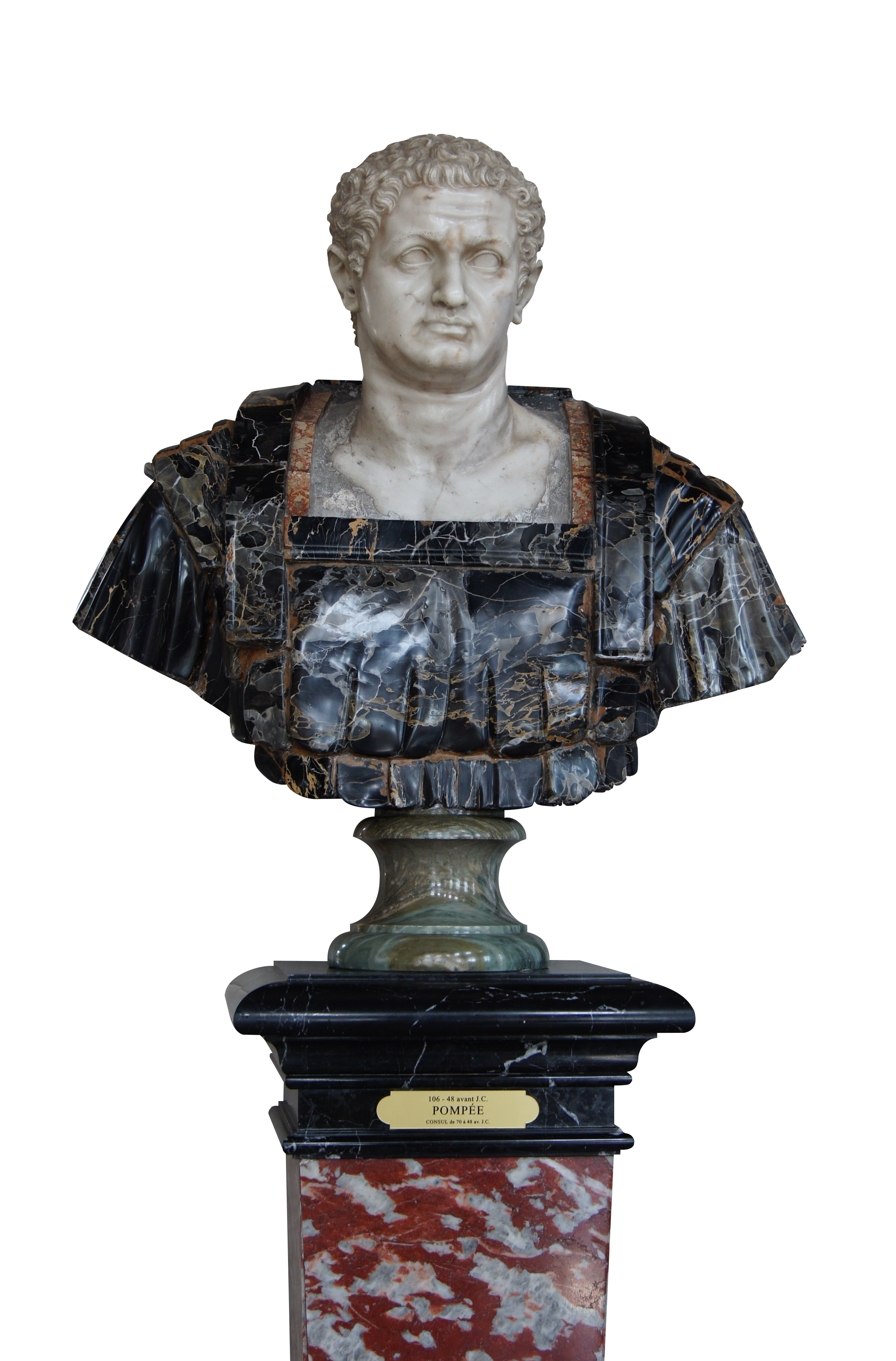
Bust of Pompey, the founder of Pamplona.

...then, above Lacetani, northward, is the nation of the Vascones, whose principal city is Pompelon, as in "the city of Pompey".

— Strabo

According to the latest archaeological discoveries in Castle Square, in the middle of the current city center, Roman Pompelon had baths, the largest in northern Spain according to some scholars, which gives the city a higher category than it had traditionally been considered.

(Note: The findings in the castle square in the early 2000s were destroyed, despite public protests by citizens, which even led to two police officers being injured in June 2002. Against the opinion of several archaeologists, including the eight involved in the excavations, most of the archaeological remains found were dismantled, with only a wall and the remains of the castle ordered built by Ferdinand the Catholic remaining.)

== Middle Ages ==
Political map of the Iberian Peninsula in 814, when Pamplona was part of the Carolingian Hispanic March.

=== Visigoths, Carolingians and Muslims ===
In the 4th century, the Romans are replaced by the Visigoths in dominating the region. Unlike the Romans, the Visigoths did not have good relations with the Vascones. Pamplona was the diocese of the Visigothic Church and, judging by the Necropolis found, Visigoths lived there, although the bad relationship with the Vascones generated some controversy about their presence in the city. Muslims were present in the 8th and 9th centuries.

Muslim rule was briefly threatened by Charlemagne, who sent expeditions to the region in the late 8th century to extend the Marca Hispanica (or Hispanic March) to the north. The Carolingians achieved nothing more than the creation of a county in the western part of the Pyrenees, which lasted only ten years. The legendary Carolingian count Roland is said to have destroyed the walls of Pamplona in 778 to keep the city from rebelling during the failed expedition to conquer Zaragoza from the Muslims, before the Battle of Roncevaux Pass, which took place not far from Pamplona. Jimeno of Pamplona (Motmine Alacra in the Arab chronicles) took the city for the Emirate of Cordoba a few years later (781?). In 806 the Pamplona aristocracy organized against emirate rule and integrated the region into the Carolingian Empire of Louis the Pious. This Navarrese Marca Hispanica was a county of four or five thousand square kilometers that must have had no more than one count, Velasco al-Yalasqí. it was short-lived since in 816 all the Marches in the western part of the northern Pyrenees were extinguished.

Shield of Íñigo Arista (781-852), the first king of Pamplona.

=== Kingdom of Navarre vassal of the emirate ===
The Kingdom of Pamplona, the predecessor of the future Kingdom of Navarre, which would only be formally established centuries later, appeared in the 810s, and the first king of Pamplona is considered to have been Íñigo Arista, grandson of Jimeno. Although enjoying relative independence and being officially Christian, the Kingdom of Navarre was a vassal state of the Emirate of Cordoba and was founded with the support of the powerful muladi family of the Banu Qasi, lords of Ribera Navarre, the southernmost part of Navarre. The Arab chronicles refer to the first "kings" of Pamplona as "lord, count, or prince of the Vascones," (bashkunish) which means they were not recognized as kings, given the smallness of the territory and the fact that it had only one ecclesiastical district. Submission to the emirate was ensured by sporadic punitive expeditions that did not aim at permanent occupation. The initial territory of the Kingdom of Navarro was approximately 5,000 km^{2} and had as its borders the peaks of the western Pyrenees and the outer Pamplona mountains. (Note: Excerpts based on the article "Reino de Pamplona" in the Spanish-language Wikipedia (specifically the version as of March 14, 2011).)

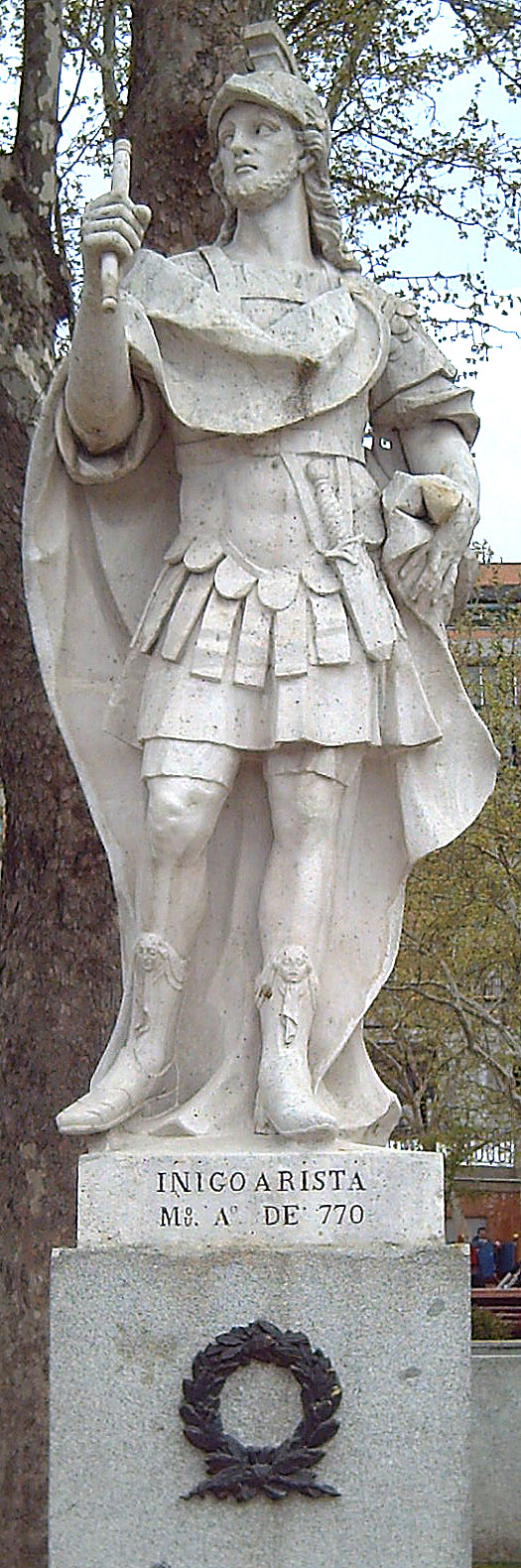
Statue of Iñigo Arista

In 824, after quelling the revolts of the Gascony nobility, the Carolingians sent troops and two counts to Pamplona to restore Carolingian sovereignty. On their return from the mission, they were surprised and captured in the Pyrenees by "perfidious Montagnards" Vascones, in what is considered the "second battle of Roncevaux Pass". Count Eblo was sent to Córdoba as a trophy and Count Aznar was set free because he was Gascon and therefore considered consanguineous. Íñigo Arista's son, Garcia Íñiguez (851-882), and grandson, Fortunio Garcés (882-905) maintained the territory of the Pamplonian kingdom and made no conquests.

=== Kingdom of Independent Pamplona ===
In 905, Sancho Garcés III, son of Dadilda de Pallars, brother of Raymond I, and García Jimenes, Jimeno's great-great-grandson, overthrew Fortunio Garcés and broke his commitments to Córdoba, founding the Jiménez Dynasty. Sancho I of Navarre (or Pamplona), as he became known, extended the kingdom to San Esteban de Deyo, on the course of the Ega River to the Ebro, and the counties of Nájera and Calahorra, the latter with the support of the King of León Ordoño II of León. These conquests precipitated the decay of the Banu Cassi. The response of the Cordoban emir was fast, and he sent two expeditions to regain control of Navarre. The first of these expeditions won the Battle of Valdejunquera (920) and reoccupied almost all of La Rioja, but did not reach the Cuenca of Pamplona. The second expedition destroyed the city in 924. Despite the setbacks, Sancho's kingdom had about 15,000 km^{2} after the war with the Muslims, three times as much as when he took power.

Sancho Garcés III (nicknamed, "the Great"), was king of Pamplona and the County of Aragon between 1004 (or 1000) and 1035 (as Sancho III). In addition to these titles, he was lord of several other Iberian counties, such as that of Sobrarbe and Ribagorza from 1018, of Castile, Álava and of Monzón from 1028, and of Cea from 1030. After the supposed conquest of León (contested by many historians), Sancho III is said to have been named Imperator totius Hispaniae (emperor of all Spain), another widely contested event. However, it is known that he is designated Rex Ibericus by Abbot Oliva and Sancio rege Navarriae Hispaniarum by Rodulfus Glaber, which supports the thesis of many historians who present him as the first great Christian king of the Iberian Peninsula. Although his empire was divided after his death, fulfilling his will, (Note: Excerpts based on the article "Sancho Garcês III de Pamplona" in the Spanish-language Wikipedia (specifically the version as of March 17, 2011).) the Kingdom of Navarre inherited by his son Garcia Sanches III was much more extensive than in his grandfather's time and than it would ever be in the future.

Political map of the Iberian Peninsula in 910.

The history of the 130 years following the death of Sancho III is filled with conflicts, with neighboring states both Christian and Muslim having constant border changes. In Eleanor64, Sancho VI of Navarre (1133-1194) definitively abandons the title of King of Pamplona and officially calls himself King of Navarre.

Historically, a Jewish community existed in Pamplona. The first documentation of Jews in Pamplona dates to 958 A.D., when Hasdai Ibn Shaprut visited Pamplona on a diplomatic mission to meet with Sancho I. The Jews of Pamplona had an independent court system which enforced the Jewish system of halacha, or religious laws. In 1498, the Jewish population was either expelled or forced to convert to Christianity.

=== Kingdom of Navarre ===
Sancho VI's renaming of the kingdom was part of the strategy to assert sovereignty over the entire territory of Navarre, disputed with the neighboring kingdoms of Aragon and, especially, with Castile. Conflicts with these kingdoms were constant during Sancho VI's reign.

==== War of the boroughs ====
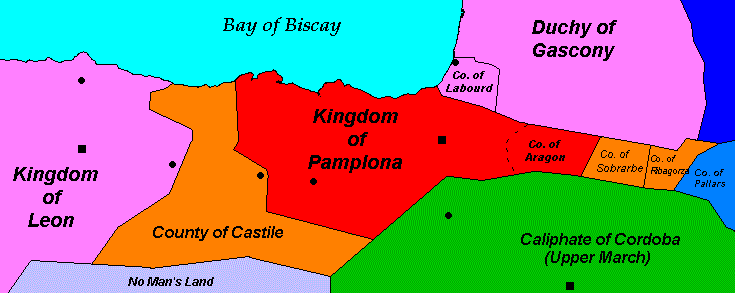
The Kingdom of Navarre ca. 1000

The Kingdom of Navarre in 1035, the year Sancho III the Great died. In addition to the Kingdom of Navarre, Sancho III also held the counties of Castile, Aragon and Ribagorza

From the beginning of the 10th century until 1423, Pamplona was not a homogeneous city, but a set of three boroughs whose inhabitants mixed little or not at all often clashed, and had to have walls to defend themselves from each other. The first of these burghs, Navarrería, was created by Sancho III at the beginning of the 10th century to counteract the depopulation that the city was suffering. At the beginning of the following century, the bishop promoted the creation of a second village, San Cernin, which was officially recognized in 1129 by King Alfonso the Battler, who granted it a foral very similar to that of Jaca, placing it under royal protection. The third borough, the población de San Nicolás is contemporary and neighboring to the burgo of San Cernin, with which conflicts were frequent.

Only the borough of Navarrería was inhabited exclusively by natives (Vascones), the inhabitants of the two other boroughs being originally Frankish, although in Navarrería there was some ethnic heterogeneity. All the boroughs were under the authority of the bishop, but had distinct administration and privileges. This structure caused frequent disagreements and confrontations from 1213 onwards, which would culminate in the destruction of Navarrería (Navarrería War) and the massacre of its population in September 1276 with the support of French troops, to the point that the land of the borough was left virtually abandoned for 50 years.

Later, when repopulation took place, confrontations began again, which would only end with the "Privilege of the Union", the treaty promoted and granted by Charles III on 8 September 1423, which finally united the city and determined the destruction of the walls that separated the boroughs from each other.

==== Succession Civil War ====
In 1441 queen Blanche I dies, leaving as successor her son Charles, Prince of Viana. However, who occupies the throne is widowed consort king John II, who prevents his son from being king. In 1451, Carlos takes advantage of the entry of Castilian troops in Navarre to rebel against his father, starting a war for the succession that will last beyond his death in 1461 and will eventually lead to the conquest of Navarre by the united kingdoms of Castile and Aragon. (Note: Excerpts based on the article "Guerra Civil de Navarra" in the Spanish-language Wikipedia (specifically the version as of March 17, 2010).)

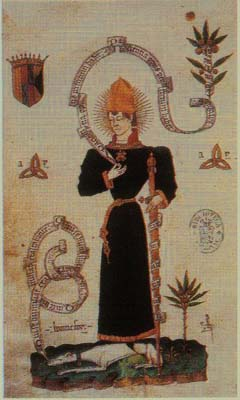
Charles, Prince of Viana (1421-1461), in an Aragonese codex.

The war, though long, was not intense but had serious consequences for the economy of the kingdom. There was almost no fighting, the military actions consisting of expeditions, more or less passive sieges, destruction of crops and other acts of sabotage. The war had countless adventures and changes of allies on both sides, foreign and domestic. The plans of the great regional powers had a great influence on events, and a series of intertwined plots ensued, involving revolts in Catalonia, where John II also reigned, disputes between Henry IV of Castile and the Liga Nobiliaria (Nobiliary League) of Castile which John II joined in 1460, the desire of John II's second wife Juana Enríquez to make her son Ferdinand II king of a unified Spain, and also the kings of France Louis XI and Louis XII, either directly or through the influential Foix family. The main Navarre factions were the two rival groups of Agramontes and Beaumontes nobles. At the beginning of the war, the latter, led by Luís de Beaumont, second Count of Lerín sided with Charles and was the predominant party in Pamplona.

Charles died in 1461, but the dispute for the succession continued between his sisters Eleanor of Navarre, married to the Frenchman Gaston IV, Count of Foix, and Blanche II, former wife of Henry IV of Castile. Branca was imprisoned by her father in 1461 and would eventually be poisoned to death by a lady of Eleanor in 1464. Eleanor took over the government of the kingdom under her father's tutelage, but in 1468 father and daughter fell out, causing another revolt in Pamplona at the beginning of which the bishop is murdered. This time the Agramontese sided with Eleanor and the Beaumontese sided with John.

Coat of arms of the Foix dynasty of Navarre

Although there were several agreements, in practice never fulfilled, between Eleanor and her stepmother Juana Enríquez, Eleanor was never recognized as a queen or heir. Even before his father's death, Ferdinand II began to meddle more and more in Navarrese politics, declaring himself "by the grace of God, king of Navarre, Castile, León, Portugal, Sicily and firstborn of Aragon" in the peace agreement he promoted in 1476 between the Agramontese and the Beaumontese.

After the death of John II on 20 February 1479, Eleanor was proclaimed queen as Eleanor I on 1 March, but died 15 days later, having designated as her heir her grandson, Francis Phoebus, a minor, whom she advised allying with the French king. Magdalena of Valois, Francis' mother, assumed the regency. Catholic Monarchs of Spain pressed for the marriage of their son and heir John to Francis' sister, Catherine of Foix, which never took place. With Francis' untimely death, Catherine assumed the throne of Navarre in 1483 and married the following year to the Frenchman John III of Navarre.

The maneuvers of Ferdinand II prevented Catherine's official coronation until 1494. Furthermore, under the pretext of deterring French influence in Navarre, Ferdinand takes military control of the kingdom, both by the presence of Castilian troops and by placing the alcaldeans and Garrisons of the Navarrese fortresses under his orders. Despite promises to withdraw the Castilian troops, they would only leave when another revolt took place in 1507, during which the Count of Lerín, leader of the Beaumontese, who had meanwhile become supporters of the Castilians, was also expelled. Although the expulsion of the Count of Lerín marked the end of the civil war, the conflicts did not end and would eventually lead to the conquest of Navarre by Ferdinand II with the support of the Beaumontese.

== Early Modern Period ==
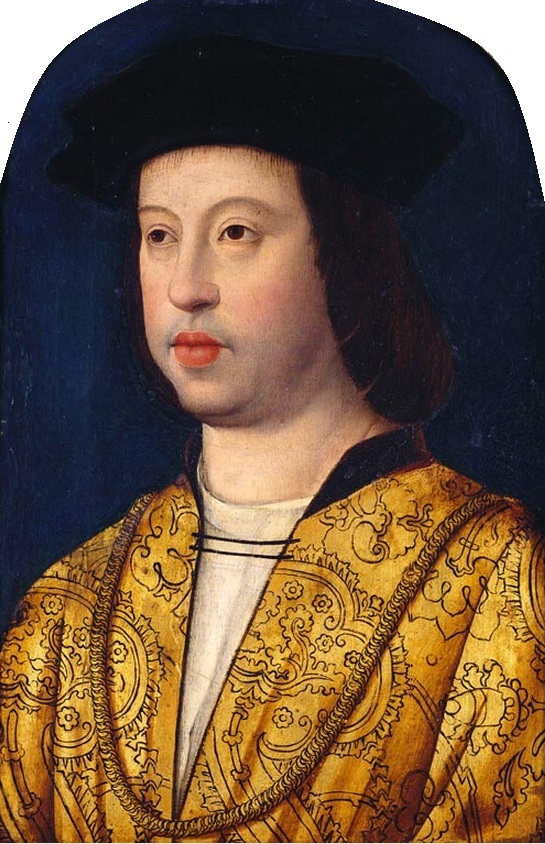
Ferdinand II of Aragon.

=== Castilian-Aragonian invasion ===
Invoking the dynastic rights of his new wife, Germana de Foix, Ferdinand II carried out his old aspiration to annex the kingdom of Navarre. On 19 July 1512 an army of over 18,000 men commanded by Fadrique Álvarez de Toledo, 2nd Duke of Alba, entered the kingdom from Álava. Accompanying this army comes Luis de Beaumont III, Count of Lerín, exiled for some years in Castile, and his brother-in-law, Duke of Nájera, at the head of 700 royal cuirassiers.

On the 24th the Castilian troops reached Taconera, at the gates of Pamplona. The city was not yet heavily fortified as it would later become, the walls being formed by the buildings themselves, and it had between 6,000 and 10,000 inhabitants. The next day Pamplona surrendered after negotiations had taken place, but other squares maintained some resistance.

After the occupation, there were three attempts to reconquer the Navarrese kingdom. In October 1512 Navarre forces supported by the French besieged Pamplona. On the 24th of the same month, the Duke of Alba returned to the city after having taken refuge in Lower Navarre. The Duke of Alba directed the defensive preparation of Pamplona, ordering the destruction of all buildings, fences, vineyards, and orchards around Pamplona so that they would not be used as shelter or supply the attackers. The southern flank, which was not protected by the Arga River, was strengthened by knocking down about thirty houses. The Castilian forces outnumbered the city's inhabitants, but only had two falconets (light cannon) and one lombard (heavy cannon) at their disposal. The expulsion of 200 Agramontese suspected of being supporters of the Navarrese king was ordered, and supplies were secured from several locations. In the defense of the city, alongside the Castilians, were many Beaumontese leaders. A scaffold was installed inside to intimidate the inhabitants.

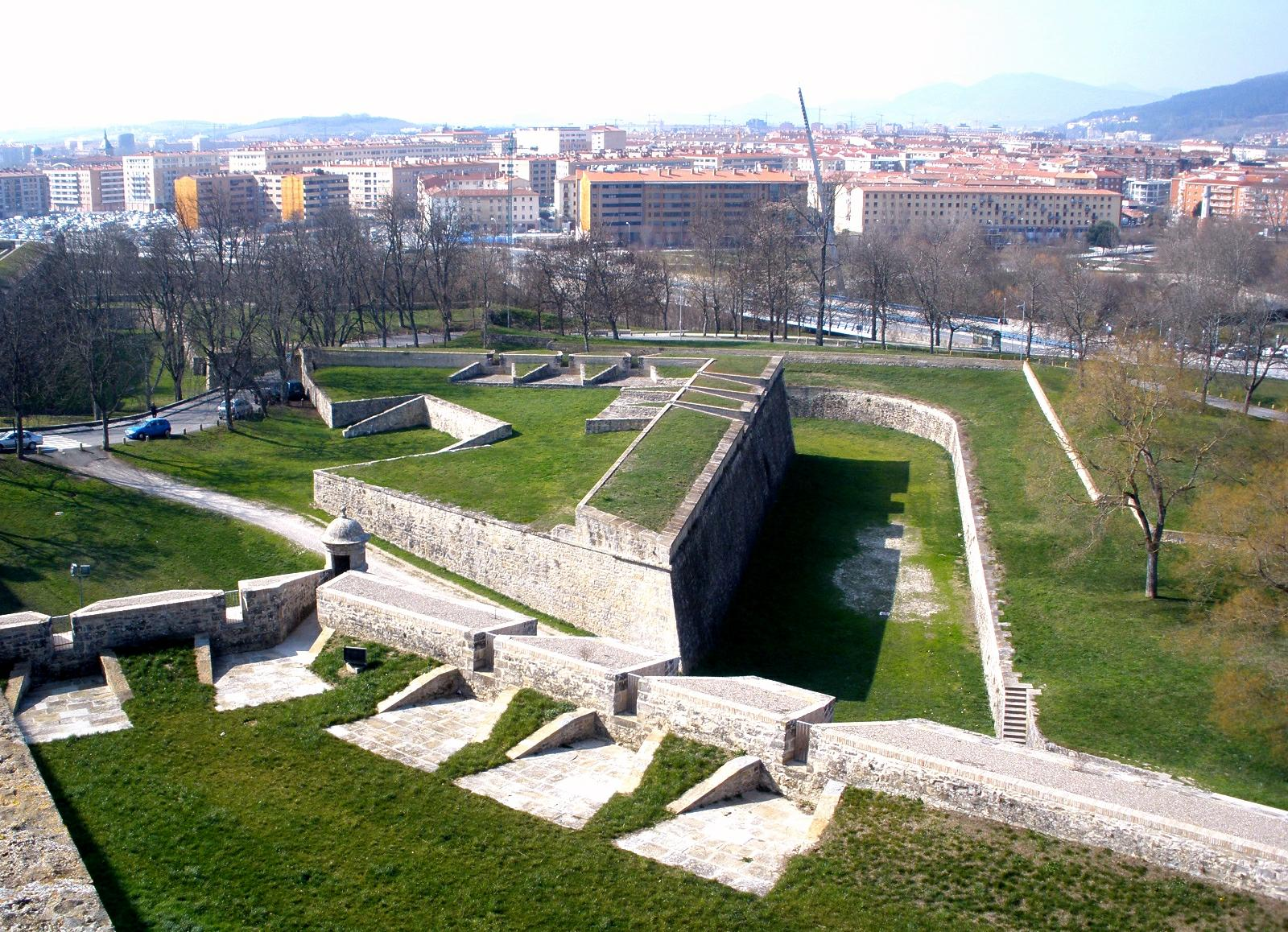
Baluarte del Redin

On 1 November the first Navarro-Gazcony troops arrived in the vicinity of Pamplona. The bulk of the army arrived two days later, settling on the slopes of Mount Ezcaba, in Villava and Huarte. The army that surrounded the city reached more than 20,000 men, about half of them Navarrese and the rest Gascon from the territories of Albret and Foix, Albanians and Lansquenets, as well as eight mortars and other artillery pieces. The southern flank defenses were buffeted to cut off supplies to the city, but were unable to conclude an effective siege. There were several attacks and skirmishes. The first major combat occurred on 7 November. The lack of food supplies and the arrival of the cold weather affected the besieging troops most severely, needing to feed on dried fruits and boiled vegetables. A herd of 600 cows sent from Roncal to supply the besiegers was intercepted by the troops of the Archbishop of Zaragoza and quartered in Sangüesa. Inside Pamplona, Colonel Cristóbal Villalba ordered, under penalty of death, that the streets be kept lit and that armed assistance be given when the alarm was given. Hunger is also felt in the countryside and 818 men, among neighbors and servants, enlist to be able to eat the two daily meals given to the troops. The Navarre troops take the castle of Tiebas, south of Pamplona, on 24 November. On the 27th the city is attacked again, but the attackers are repelled. The news that Castilian reinforcements from the Count of Nájera were approaching the capital demoralized the besiegers, who, after another failed assault on 29 November, began their retreat to Baztan. On 30 November, when the retreat had not yet been completed, a reinforcement of 6,000 Castilian infantrymen arrived in Pamplona to reinforce the defense.

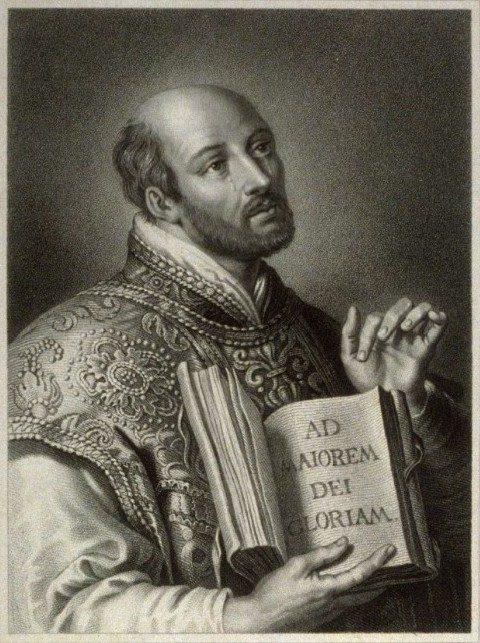
Ignatius of Loyola, the founder of the Society of Jesus, then captain of the Castilian army, was wounded during the attempt to reconquer Pamplona by the kings of Navarre in 1521

A period of consolidation followed. The Navarrese Courts met in March 1513, when the papal bull Exigit Contumacium of 18 February was presented excommunicating the kings of Navarre, Catherine of Foix and John III of Albret, for supporting Louis XII of France in the war against the Papal States. At this meeting, the viceroy announced a general pardon to those who abided by the new authority, and in the name of Ferdinand II swore to respect the fueros (forals), uses and customs of the kingdom, on the condition that the war would end. Most of the Agramontese nobles were absent from these courts, as were several abbots, representatives of the ecclesiastical power. Ferdinand II ratified the oath on 12 June 1513. On 7 July 1515 the Kingdom of Navarre was formally annexed to that of Castile at the meeting of the Courts of Castile in Burgos, where no Navarrese representative was present.

In 1516 there was another attempt to liberate Navarre, this time without French support, but the troops did not reach Pamplona and were stopped in Roncal. In 1521, taking advantage of the reduction in military numbers due to the Revolt of the Comuneros, another expedition was organized to recover the kingdom, again with the support of the king of France. The expedition was commanded by the French general André de Foix. At the same time, a rebellion was prepared, which broke out before the troops arrived. The rebellion was successful in Pamplona, where the Castilian troops were besieged in the castle for two or three days. Among the besieged troops was the Gipuzkoan captain Íñigo López de Oñaz y Loyola (Ignatius of Loyola, the founder of the Society of Jesus), who was wounded during the bombardment to make the square surrender. Among the insurgents were the two brothers of Francis Xavier (Saint Francis Xavier), Miguel and João, sons of the deposed president of the Royal Council, who were to remain in charge of the city. The bulk of the Franco-Navarian army headed for Logroño and surrounded it. The army of Charles V (I of Spain) recovered by managing to recruit 30,000 soldiers. The two armies faced each other in the bloody Battle of Esquiroz (known as de Noáin by the Spanish) on 30 June 1521, in which the outnumbered Navarro-Gascon forces were defeated and lost Pamplona for good.

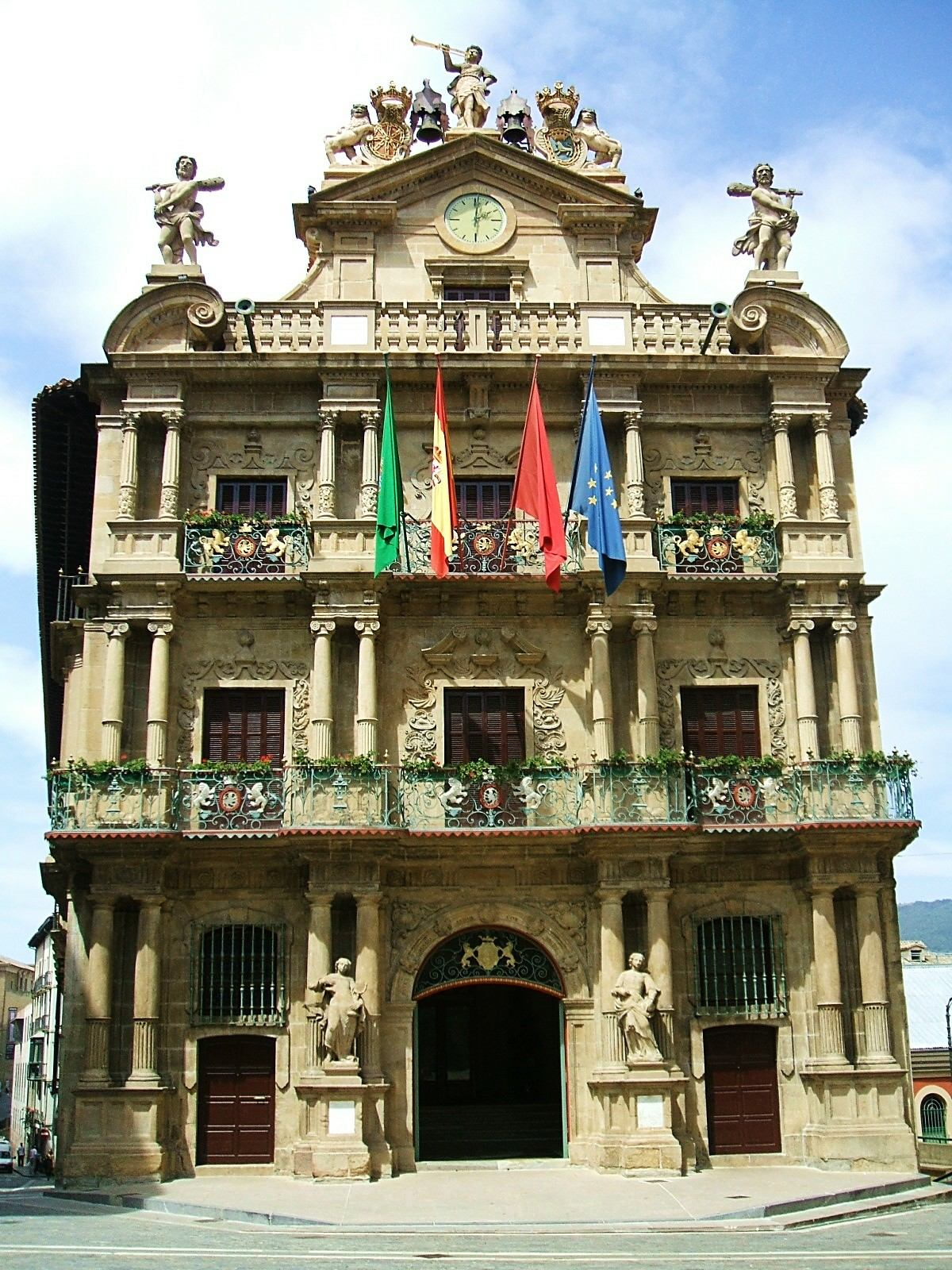
The seat of the ayuntamiento, built in the 18th century.

Pamplona must have been badly battered economically by these battles and sieges, for the king granted its inhabitants a tax exemption for five years.

=== Period of the Viceroys ===
The economic distribution of the Pamplonese at the beginning of the 18th century was the usual one for a city of that time: a quarter of the inhabitants were engaged in agriculture and animal husbandry, a third were artisans, and part of the rest belonged to the aristocracy and the clergy. The most important industries were the textile industry, paper and gunpowder mills. From 1750 on, the city was modernized. It is then that a seat for the ayuntamiento (the municipal government), a sanitation and drinking water distribution network is built, as well as a new neoclassical style facade for the cathedral.

=== French Invasion ===
During the War of the Pyrenees in 1794, the city was surrounded by the French army, which failed to enter the city. Napoleon's troops controlled Pamplona between 16 February 1808 and 31 October 1813, making it one of its main citadels.

In 1814 the first liberal pronunciamiento was produced in the city, headed by Francisco Espoz y Mina. In 1823 Pamplona was bombarded and captured by the invading army of the "Hundred Thousand Sons of San Luis."

== Late Modern Period ==
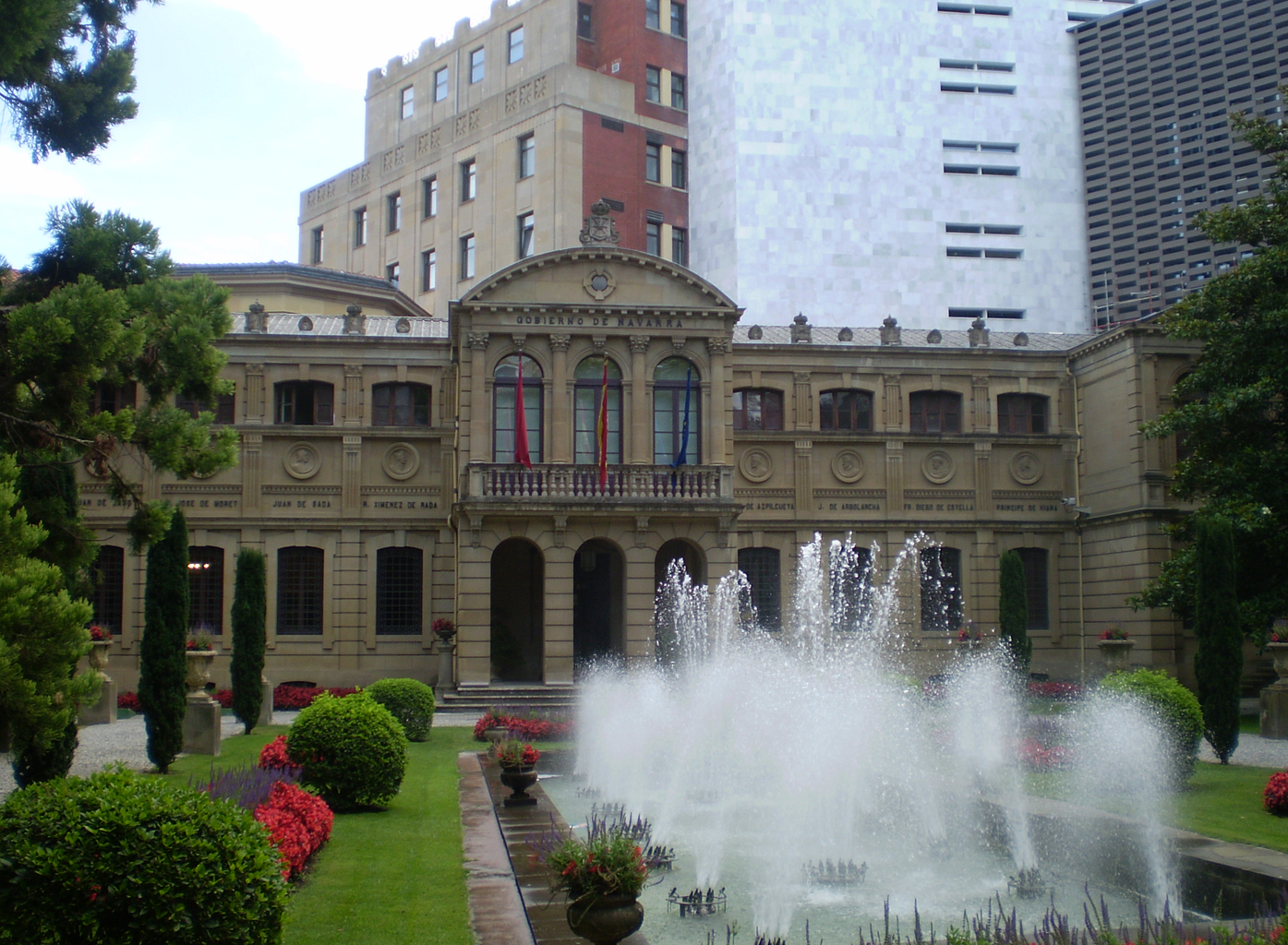
Gardens of the Navarre Palace

=== Carlist Wars ===
At the end of the 19th century the "Gamazada" took place, a popular movement in defense of the fueros, whose memory the Navarren decided to perpetuate for the following generations by building in 1903 the "Monument to the Navarre Fueros" in front of the Palace of Navarre in Pamplona, whose construction was financed by popular subscription.

=== Urbanism of the late 19th and early 20th centuries ===
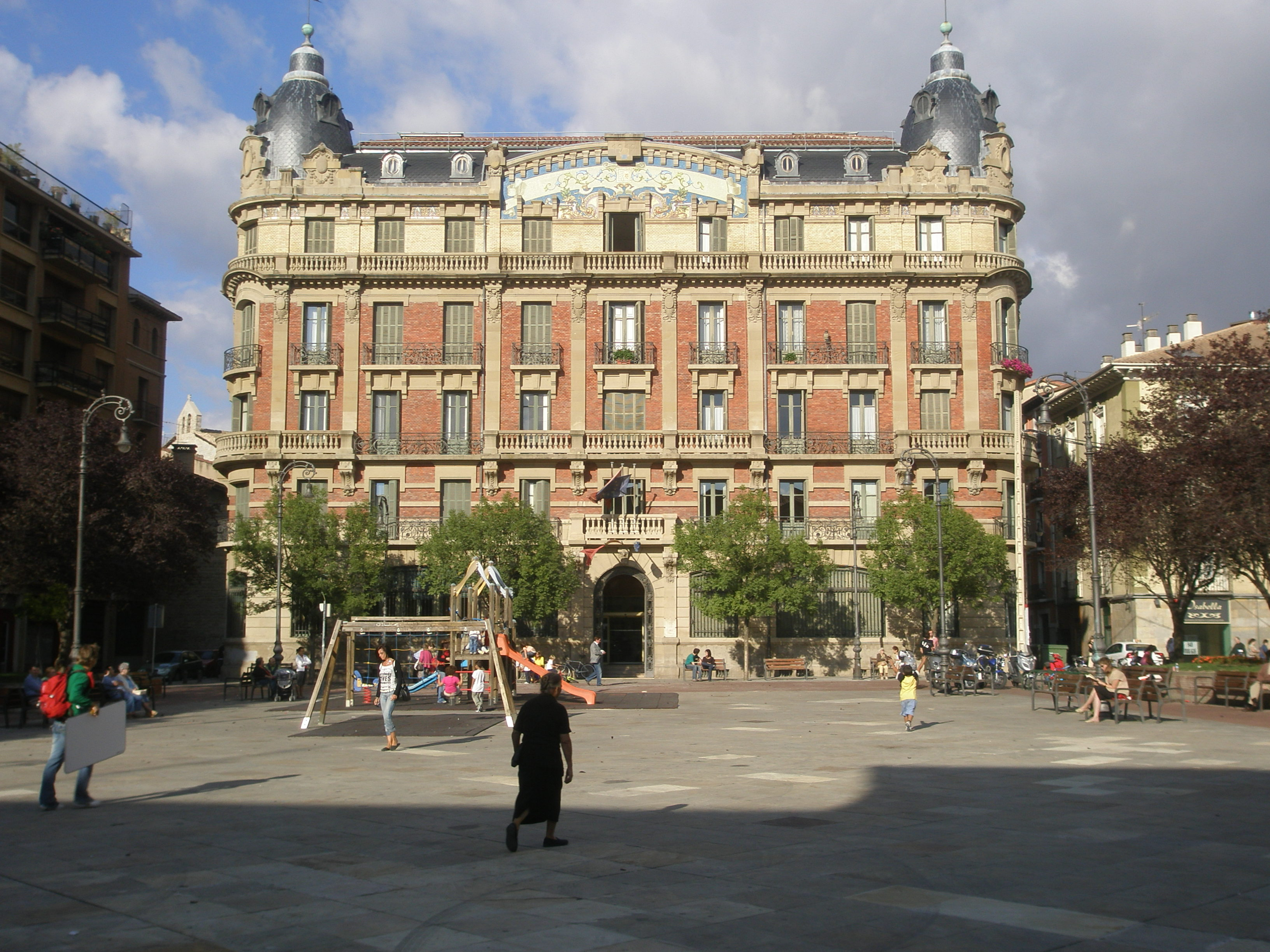
La Agrícola building, from 1914, a former bank and insurance company, nowadays the Municipal Library

Pamplona remained enclosed by its walls until the early 20th century, which caused the population to struggle with a lack of space and which prevented the city from meeting the challenges of a society that was beginning to abandon the "Ancien Régime" ways of living and working. Instead of expanding, the city grew in height: many of the old buildings are relatively tall compared to buildings of the same era in other Spanish cities.

Sacrificing purely heritage interests to the interests of the city, the walls began to be torn down in 1905 between the Taconera and Labrit areas to allow orderly growth to the south. Thus emerged the Second Ensanche (the "First Ensanche" dates from 1888 and consisted of an expansion around the citadel). From the center of the city, that is, Castle Square, new streets were built towards the south, according to a strict scheme similar to the one applied by Cerdà in the "Ensanche" of Barcelona.

=== Second Republic ===
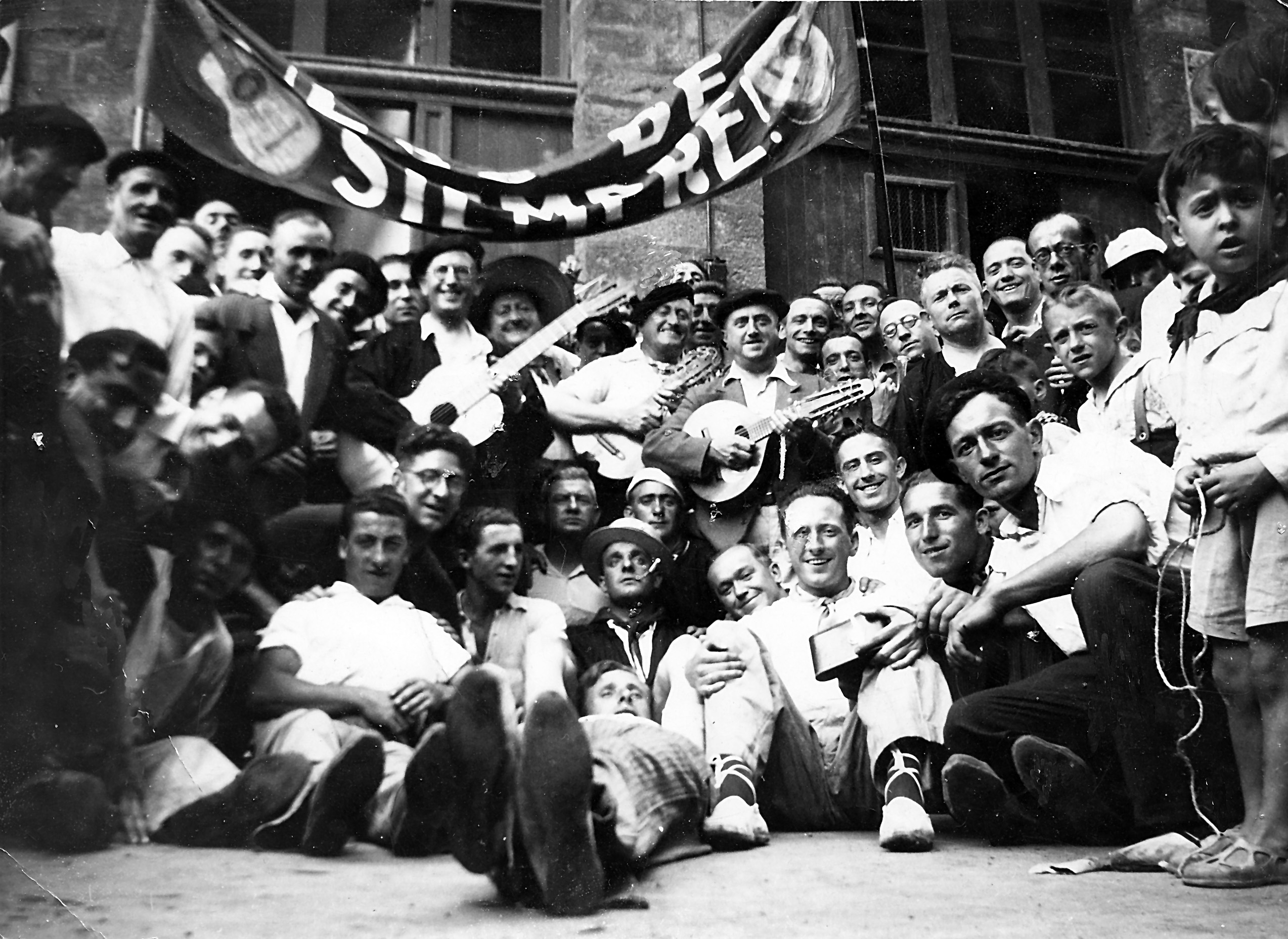
The cuadrilla "Los de Siempre, a group of revelers, during the Sanfermines (Festival of San Fermín) of 1928

The municipal elections of 12 April 1931, that led to the Second Spanish Republic, were won in Pamplona by a monarchist-rightist coalition, which elected 17 councilors (10 carlista-jaimistas and one monarchist); the republican-socialists elected 12 councilors (one socialist); the Basque nationalists did not elect any councilors. However, the republican-socialist bloc contested these elections, so they were repeated on 31 May, this time with the victory of the leftists, who obtained 8,645 votes in Pamplona and 15 councilors; the right obtained 6,997 votes and 14 councilors. Mariano Ansó was sworn in as alcalde, but because several republican aldermen, including Ansó himself, had subsequently taken provincial or national posts, by the end of 1932 the municipal government consisted of 13 monarchist aldermen, 6 radical republicans, 3 socialists, 3 members of the Republican Action, 2 radical socialists, 1 autonomous republican, and one independent. Nicasio Garbayo, from the Navarro Autonomous Republican Party, was elected alcalde. In August 1934, Garbayo resigned, along with all the leftist councilors, which led to carlista Tomás Mata being sworn in as alcaide, a position he retained until 1940.

From 1932 onwards, the carlists openly acted as a paramilitary force, having caused several incidents in and around the streets of Pamplona, with people such as Silvano Cervantes, Mario Ozcoidi and Jaime del Burgo (the latter father of Jaime Ignacio del Burgo) standing out as leaders.

=== Spanish Civil War ===
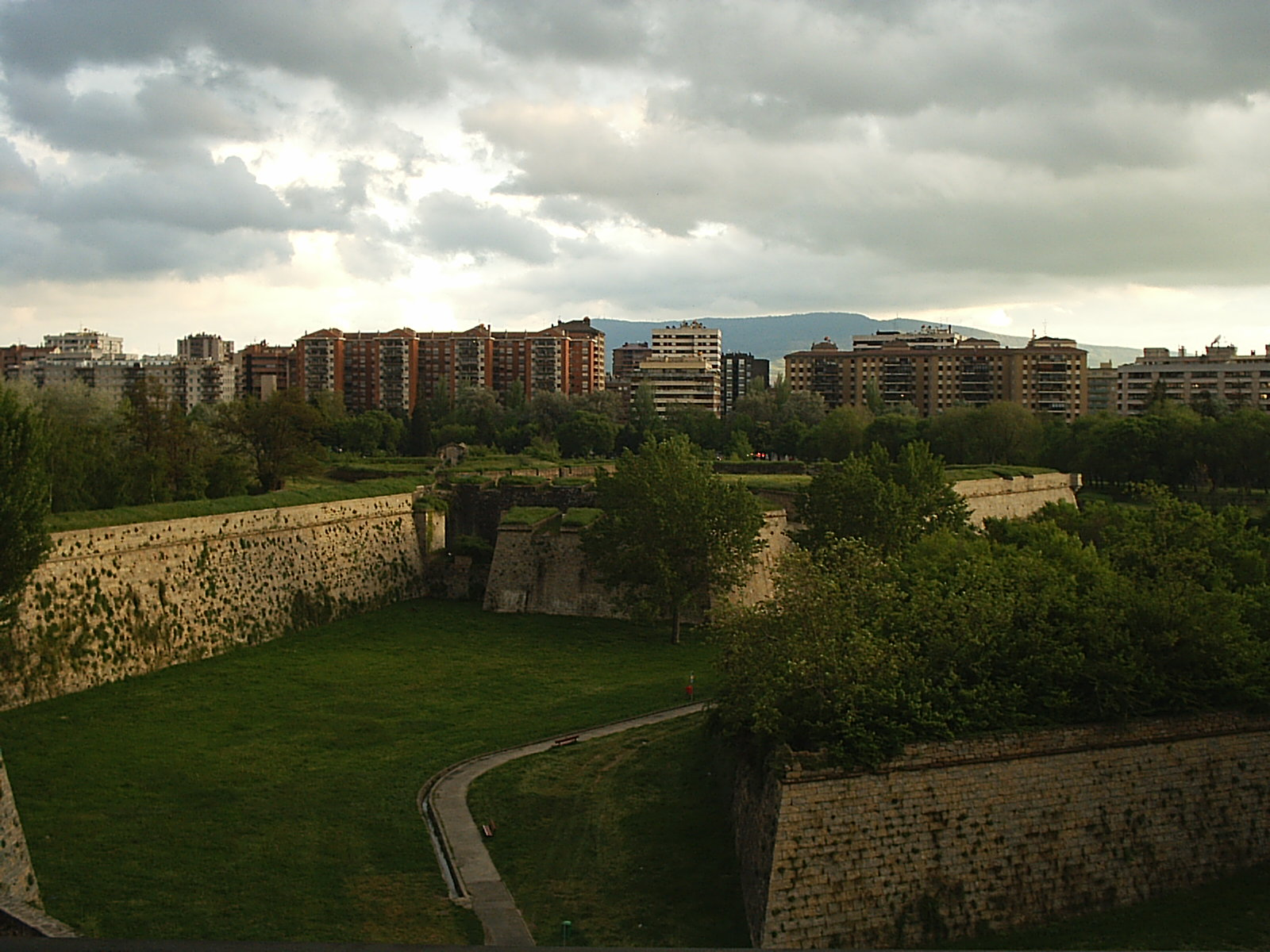
The citadel of Pamplona, scene of many shootings during the civil war

After the electoral victory of the Popular Front, General Emilio Mola was transferred from Morocco to Pamplona as military governor. The intention of the Republican government with this appointment was to divide the coup plotters and better control the rightist general. The elections in Pamplona had been won by the right, which included the carlists with 11,963 votes; the left won 2,416 votes. Mola's appointment had the opposite effect of that expected by the Republican government, as the general put himself in contact with the carlista "requetés" paramilitary groups through the mediation of the director of the Diario de Navarre, Raimundo García García (known as "Garcilaso", one of his pseudonyms).

The coup d'état of 18 July called the Alzamiento Nacional by the uprisings, was successful in Pamplona, with only a small resistance in some streets of the city led by the commander of the Civil Guard in Navarre, José Rodríguez-Medel, who was assassinated by one of his subordinates when he was organizing forces loyal to the republic after refusing to support the uprising. The proclamation of adherence to the alzamiento was printed in the typography of the Diario de Navarre and distributed. Several headquarters of republican organizations were raided, including that of the Basque Nationalist Party, where the daily newspaper La Voz de Navarre was published, and its director José Aguerre Santesteban was arrested. The printer of La Voz de Navarre started printing Arriba España, a Francoist newspaper. This was followed by purges of officials and shootings at the rear of the citadel, which continued until after the end of the war.

The bishop of Pamplona, Marcelino Olaechea, who at first remained formally neutral, on 23 August called for a procession praying to Our Lady of the Rosary with the following words:

We live in a historical hour in which the sacred interests of religion and the fatherland are at stake [...] a struggle between civilization and barbarism.

On the same day, he published a pastoral exhortation in which he expressly qualified the war as a "crusade" and in which he asked for alms for those who were fighting "for the cause of God and Spain because it is not a war [...] it is a crusade, and the Church [...] cannot do less than all it has done in favor of her crusaders." He was the first bishop to define the war in this way.

There was no war front in Pamplona, but in a city that had 42,259 inhabitants according to the 1930 census, 303 people were murdered, among them six who had been councilmen: Florencio Alfaro Zabalegui, Gregorio Angulo Martinena, Corpus Dorronsoro Arteta, Victorino García Enciso, Mariano Sáez Morilla, and Ignacio Sampedro Chocolonea. The average number of executions was estimated at 6.76 per thousand inhabitants.

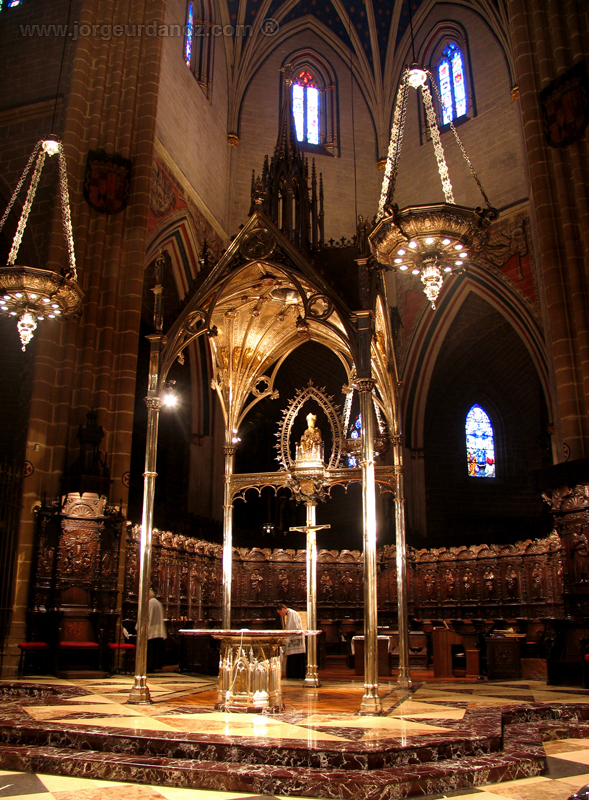
Baldachin and neo-gothic chancel inside the Cathedral of Pamplona

One of the most tragic events of the civil war took place at Fort San Cristobal, located on Mount Ezcaba near Pamplona. The fort was used as a concentration camp to incarcerate anti-francoists in inhumane conditions, and there, on 22 May 1938, took place the largest prisoner escape in Spanish history, in what became known as the "Escape from Fort San Cristobal". Of the 795 prisoners who escaped, only 3 managed to escape to France; 211 were killed and the rest were recaptured; of these, 14 were sentenced to death and shot on 8 September near the citadel of Pamplona.

=== Francoist dictatorship ===
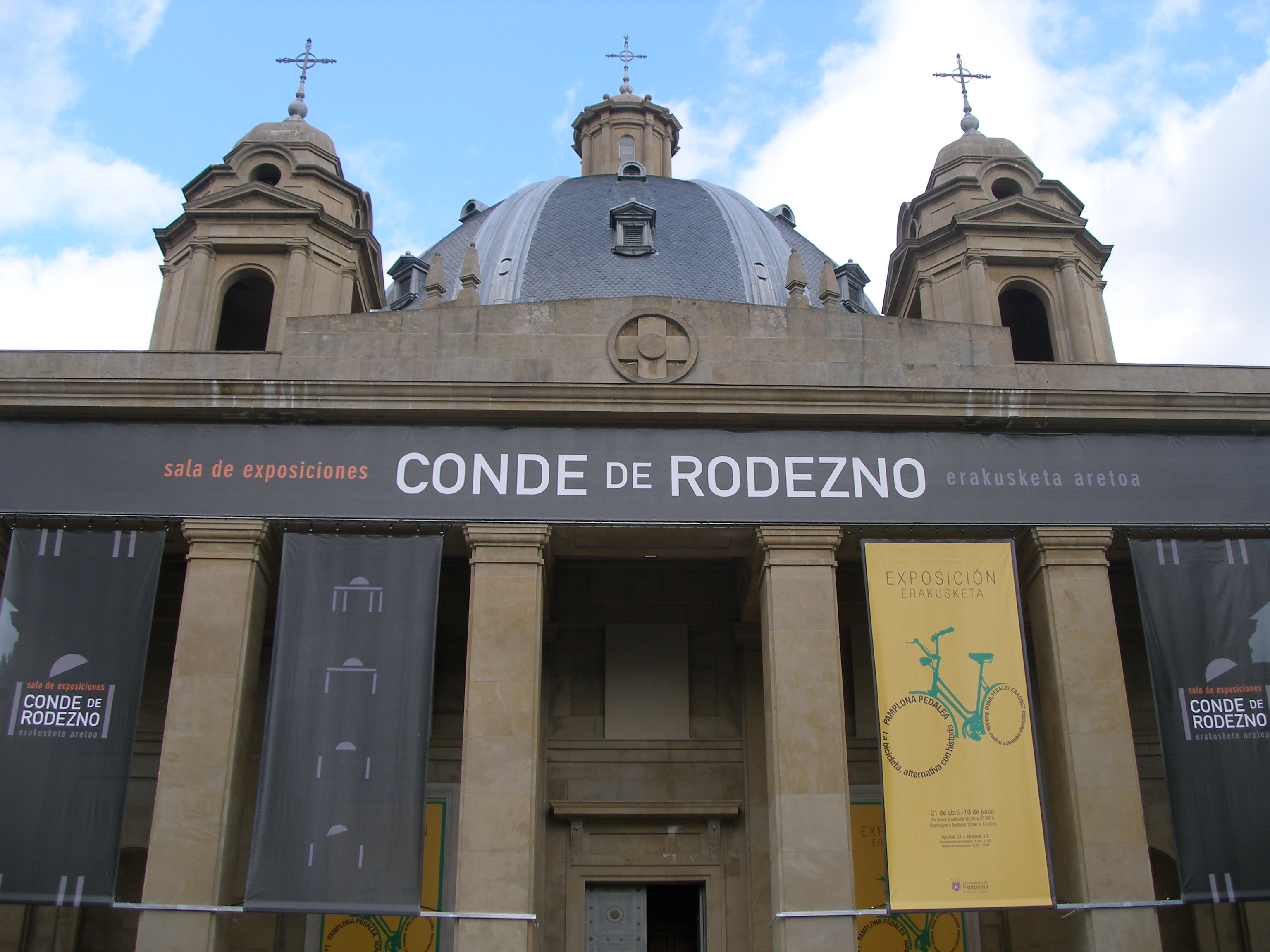
Monument to the Fallen, erected in memory of the dead of the civil war on the side of the Nationalists. Nowadays it is the "Count of Rodezno Exhibition Hall".

During the Francoist regime, the names of Pamplona's main avenues came to reflect the ideology of the regime, a situation that only changed with the arrival of democracy in the 1970s, although some vestiges remain in some neighborhoods. Among the names given at the time are, for example, Avenida del General Franco, Mártires de la Patria, General Mola, etc. In honor of the fallen insurgent soldiers, the "Monument to the Fallen" was built, officially named "Navarre to its dead in the Crusade", currently renamed "Conde de Rodezno Exhibition Hall". Generals Emilio Mola and José Sanjurjo are buried there.

In the early 1950s the municipality ceded land to Opus Dei for the construction of the University of Navarra and the Navarre University Clinic, two developments that had and have great economic, ideological and social importance in Pamplona society.

Unlike what happened with the other Spanish regions, Franco's regime maintained Navarre's autonomy, recognizing the ancestral charter regime, which led to the city being administered by several "social alcaides", among whom Miguel Javier Urmeneta Ajarnaute stood out, who promoted citizen participation and even confronted the regime on some occasions. The city was also the scene of important strikes, the first of them in 1951; in the 1960s and 1970s, it came to be the city with the highest labor conflict in all of Spain.

The city's population more than tripled between the end of the civil war and 1970: from just over 42,000 in 1930, it grew to 72,000 in 1950 and 147,000 in 1970. In 1964 the industrial park of Landaben was created as part of the "Industrial Promotion Plan" of the Foral Deputation of Navarre, which gave a significant boost to Pamplona's industrial activity and contributed to a profound and widespread change in mentalities, living conditions in the city and economic relations, which until then had been based on commercial, rural and cottage industry activities.

=== Transition to democracy ===
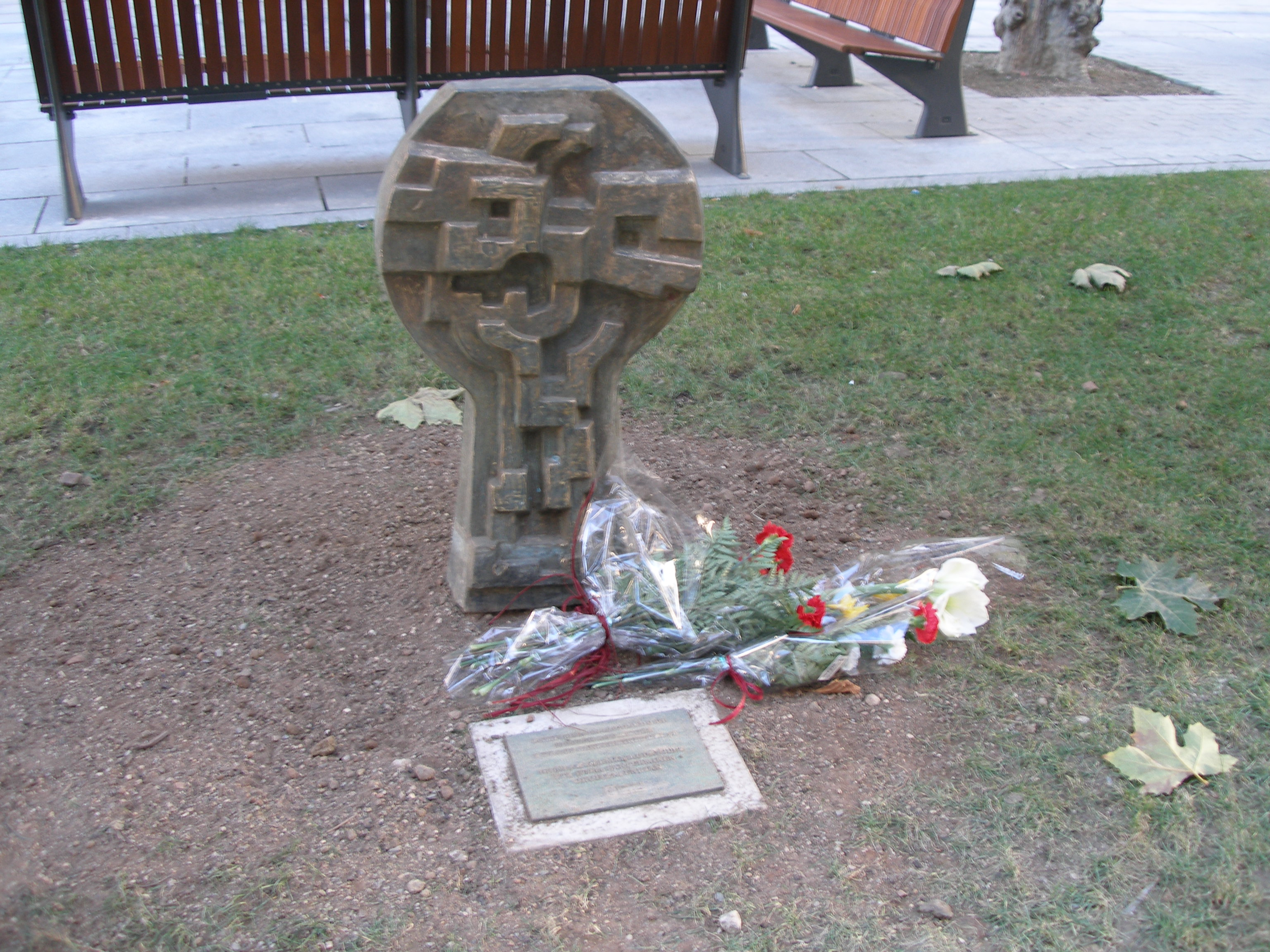
The Estela Germán Rodriguez, a memorial to the victims of the police violence that occurred during the Sanfermines of 1978. The monument marks the spot where one of the three fatalities, Germán Rodriguez, died.

The transition from Francoism to democracy was lived in Pamplona with special intensity, first at the trade union level and then, in a generalized way, at the political and cultural levels. In this period there were frequent street disturbances, attacks by the Basque terrorist and separatist organization ETA, and violent actions by the far-right, sometimes supported by the state. Among the most violent incidents were the pro-amnesty week of May 1977, in which two people died, and the Festival of San Fermín of 1978, during which three people died and more than 150 people were injured, 11 of them by the more than 7,000 shots (150 from real bullets) of the Armed Police Corps. According to some sources linked to Basque nationalism, these incidents of 1978 marked the future of Navarre.

According to ETA dissident Mario Onaindia, there were not many ETA attacks during the first phase of the transition, because that was a period when the organization rethought the armed struggle it had carried out since Francoism. However, terrorist activity recurred shortly afterward, with the political support of some working-class sectors of Pamplona linked to Alternativa KAS and Herri Batasuna and of young people who, attracted by the Marxist and collectivist orientation, found in ETA an outlet for their economic, political and personal frustration by joining the armed struggle (this thesis is by the advocates of Spanish nationalism Patxo Unzueta and Jon Juaristi, the latter a former ETA militant).

Among the ETA attacks carried out in Pamplona is the assassination in 1998 of Tomás Caballero, who was alcalde of Pamplona during the beginning of the transition and at the time of his death was a councilman for the Navarrese People's Union. This assassination provoked a strong demonstration of repudiation of ETA's violent action in Pamplona, including among politicians linked to Herri Batasuna, with some of them breaking with ETA.

Some authors point to Navarre's tax privileges as a decisive aspect of the region's economic development, which was accentuated after the approval of the 1982 law of the "Improvement of Navarre" (Ley Orgánica de Reintegración y Amejoramiento del Régimen Foral de Navarre), the equivalent for Navarre of the statute of autonomy of the other autonomous communities of Spain. Navarre is currently one of the Spanish regions with the highest gross domestic product (GDP).
