= Juan José Martinena =

Juan José Martinena Ruiz (born Pamplona, 1 August 1949) is a Spanish historian.

He holds a PhD from the University of Navarra.

He is a corresponding member of the Royal Academy of History and the American Academy of Genealogy. He is a founding member of the Society for Historical Studies of Navarra (SEHN). He was director of the Royal and General Archive of Navarra and associate professor of history at the University of Navarra until his retirement in 2010. He is also a member and vice president of the Peña Pregón Cultural Society of Navarra, publisher of the magazine Pregón Siglo XXI, and serves on the editorial board of the Society. He is one of the leading specialists in castellology in Navarre, presiding over the Navarre Board of the Spanish Association of Friends of Castles. He is an expert on the history of the train in Navarre. His concern, expressed on several occasions, to "differentiate dissemination from popularization" has led him to publish numerous works aimed at the general public and to be a regular contributor to media such as Diario de Navarra, the magazines Príncipe de Viana or Pregón Siglo XXI.
