= Privilege of the Union =

Law promulgated by Carlos III of Navarra

Celebration of the Privilege of the Union in Pamplona in 2026

In Navarre, the decree written in Navarrese Romance by which the three main population centers (also called the three burghs of Pamplona: La Navarrería, Burgo de San Cernin and Población de San Nicolás) became one is called Privilege of the Union, the Union of the Three Burghs in a single council. Previously, during the Middle Ages, they had functioned as separate administrative entities. The document, signed on September 8, 1423 by King Charles III the Noble, also had the purpose of establishing an agreement that would put an end to the secular disputes between them that it altered, as well as some ordinances that would regulate its operation.

By royal order, from then the city exhibited a new banner on and began a new project of defensive buildings, joining the spaces that remained between the burghs with new walls, and eliminating gradually the interior walls. This process gave rise to new streets, such as the one that still bears the name today, Calle Nueva, in the old part of the city.

Charles III of Navarre converted it into a Fuero with the rank of law, bringing together the Cortes de Navarra to highlight the act with greater solemnity and swear before them to respect the new legislation in perpetuity.

The Pamplona City Council was governed by the provisions of the Privilege of the Union from September 8, 1423 to September 7, 1836, except for the period between March 26, 1820 and September 18, 1823, when it had a City Council. of the government. On January 1, 1837, a new constitutional council formed through a preparatory commission in force since the previous September 8, took office.

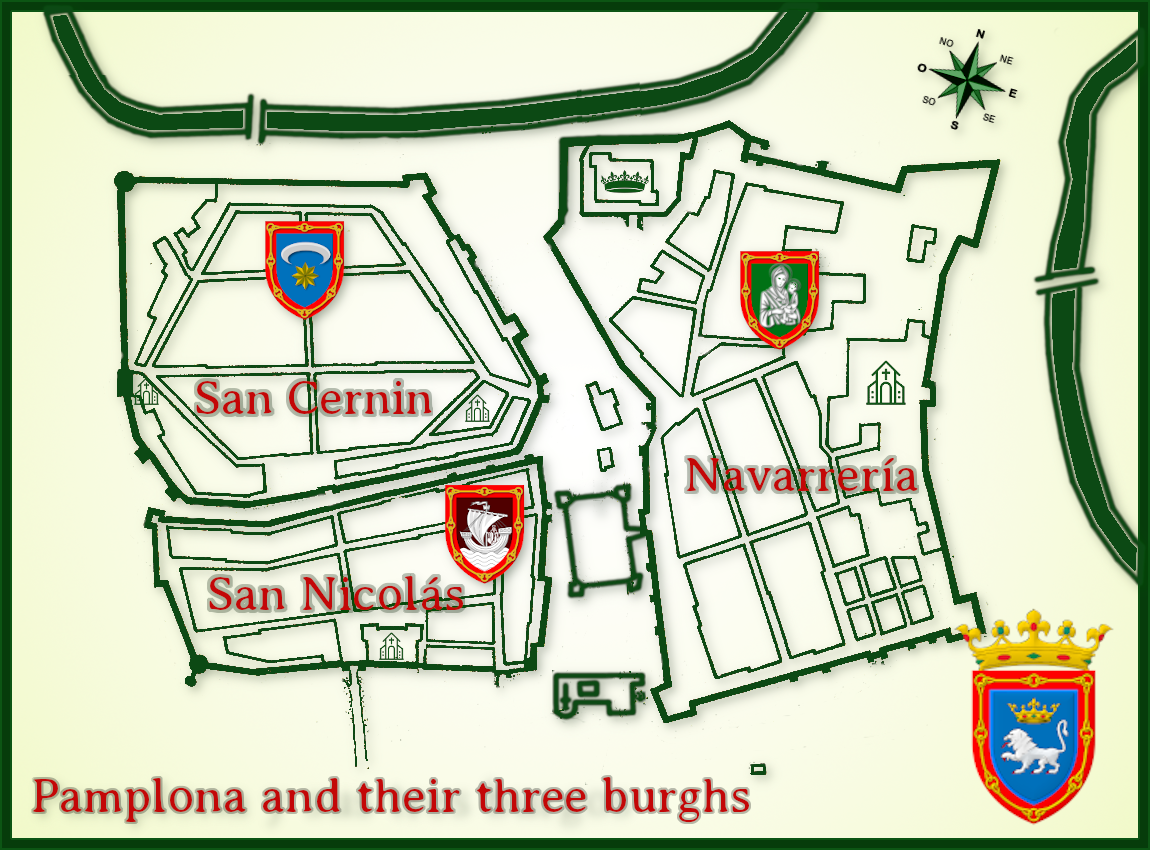
Burghs of Pamplona

== Historical background ==
To understand the importance of this law, prior knowledge of the historical context in which it was promulgated is essential. Especially tragic episodes such as the War of the Navarreria (1272) which caused the desolation for half a century of the oldest town of Pamplona established around its cathedral.

=== From the Roman municipality to ecclesiastical domain ===
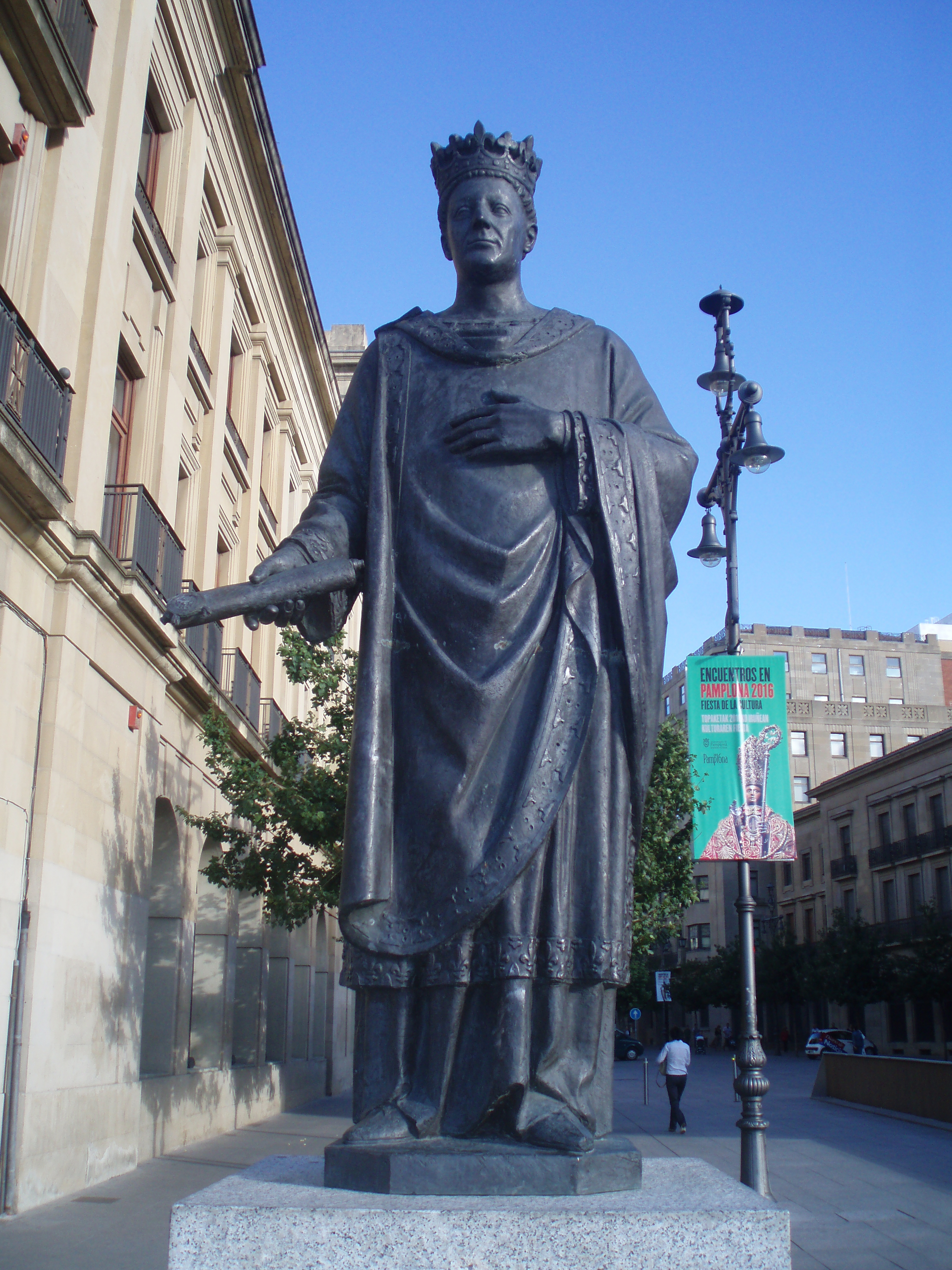
Monument to Charles III the Noble (1387-1425). Pamplona (confluence of Avenida de Carlos III and the Plaza del Castillo).

At the beginning of the 11th century, Pamplona was quite depopulated. Then, the king of Pamplona (not yet Navarre), Sancho III the Great (1004-1035) promoted the recovery of the ancient city, the original town −now called Navarrería− continuation of the historical legacy of the ancient Roman city (Pompaelo; the name in Basque, Iruña, which has been documented since the X century).

A usual episcopal see, mainly it was inhabited by peasants and cathedral servants, around which the hamlet was huddled. Between the years 1090 and 1100, as was the case in other cities of the kingdom itself, and in the neighboring Christian kingdoms, there was an intense repopulation movement. In the eastern part of the plateau where the old Roman enclave was based stands the Burgo de San Cernin (in Spanish, Burgo de San Cernin), a settlement of Frankish craftsmen and merchants. Shortly after, the Population of San Nicolás arose, with a mixed population between Franks and natives. The Burgo de San Cernin always claimed greater antiquity over it.

An important part of this whole process is the figure of Bishop Pedro de Roda, also known as Pedro de Anduque or Pedro de Rodez, occupying the seat of the diocese of Pamplona between 1083 and 1115. Pamplona's devotion to San Saturnino derives from the presence of this bishop who already in 1096 assisted Pope Urban II in the consecration of the Basilica of Saint-Sernin in Toulouse and donated to the Toulouse council itself the small church of Artajona under the name of that saint at that time. It will be during this episcopal mandate of Bishop Pedro in Pamplona when the repopulation of both Navarrería and the Burgo and the Population is documented.

The Frankish settlers, settled since the end of the 11th century on the western plain of the existing urban nucleus around the cathedral, obtained the Fuero de Jaca from King Alfonso I the Battler in 1129, which granted them numerous privileges and rights. From the urban point of view, the plan of the Burgo de San Cernin has several aspects to consider; First of all, a clear separation between the Burgo, the Navarreria (the episcopal town) and the town of San Nicolás, as shown by programs of study by José María Lacarra, Julio Caro Baroja and Juan José Martinena. The layout of Navarrería follows the classic urban articulation on two main roads, perpendicular −the cardo and the decumanus− typical of Roman foundations. The layout of the plan of San Nicolás, for its part, is reminiscent of the well-known Aquitaine-Pyrenean towns, and even anticipates later English models.

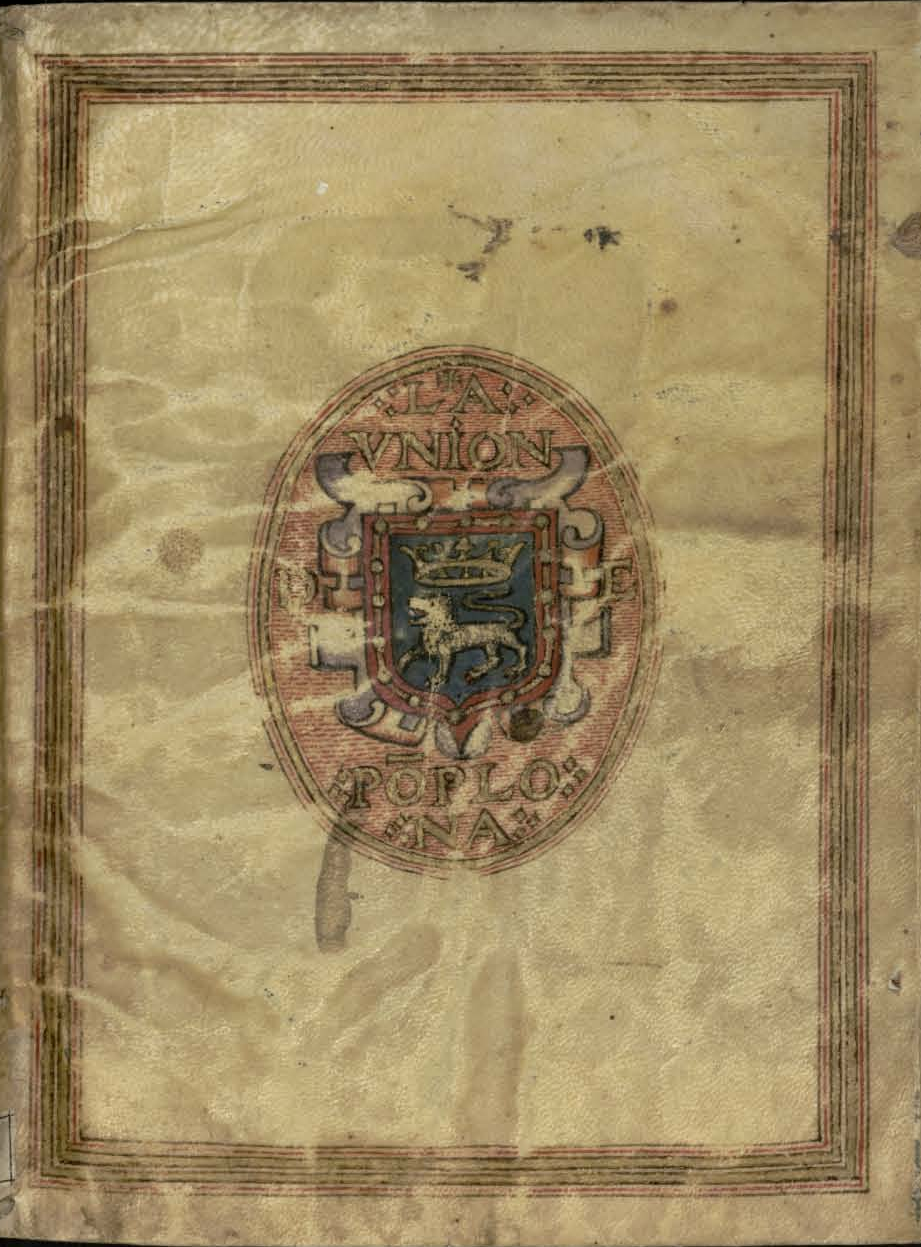
A copy of the Privilege of the Union (May 15, 1588) By Pedro de Labayen (Biblioteca Nacional de España)

== Contents ==
It is made up of 29 chapters, rules, indicating the way in which the new Pamplona city council should govern its operation: symbols, election of mayors, mayor, municipal officials, administration of justice, tax collection, control of weights and measures, etc. It also includes how this privilege must be elevated to the category of jurisdiction and law proper to Pamplona and must be approved by the three States of the Kingdom of Navarra, reserving for themselves, and their successors, "power and authority to correct, amend and interpret the Privilege and publish it where appropriate."

== The City Council ==
Although the current building is a modern construction (since 1950) with an 18th century façade, the site where it stands is the same one where the Casa de la Jurería or Town Hall was built, by royal mandate, after the promulgation of the Privilege of the Union. The space was in the downtown of the new council, very close to the Royal Palace of Navarre (now Royal and General Archives of Navarre) and outside of the each old walls of the burghs had.

=== Motto ===
Currently the city holds the titles of Very noble, very loyal and very heroic ("Muy noble, muy leal y muy heróica", in spanish) granted by three different monarchs:

- Very noble, by Charles III the Noble, already listed on the occasion of the promulgation of the so-called Privilege of the Union, of September 8, 1423.
- Very loyal, by Catherine I of Foix and John III of Albret, whose first reference is dated September 25, 1486, where it is mentioned as "noble and loyal" on the occasion of granting it the so-called "Privilege of the mere and mixed empire", that is, civil and criminal jurisdiction. In the New Chapters granted by Fernando the Catholic on June 12, 1513, this treatment of "noble and loyal" is also collected in the so-called Codex of the Privilege of the Union, of 1533, prepared by Fernando de Ilarregui as "Very Noble and Very Leal City of Pamplona".
- Very heroic, by Ferdinand VII, through Real Cédula of August 18, 1824, "in award for his faithfulness, constancy and sacrifices after the military blockade" suffered the previous year by the French army. The mention already included the triple degree: Very Noble, Very Leal and Very Heroica City of Pamplona.

== Yearly commemoration ==
The Privilege of the Union is commemorated annually on September 8th, and a festival is held in the streets of Pamplona. The city government process to the cathedral, and then parade to the town hall and read a proclamation, accompanied by a troupe of performers (the Comparsa de Gigantes y Cabezudos).

== See also ==
- Pamplona
- Charles III of Navarre
