= Gamazada =

The Gamazada is the popular reaction in Navarre in 1893 and 1894 to when the Spanish finance minister of the Liberal Party under Prime Minister Sagasta, Germán Gamazo, tried to suppress the fueros that had been established in the Compromise Act of 1841. It caused a huge uproar among the people and institutions of Navarre, with demonstrations and petitions.

== Events ==
The protests to protect the Basque fueros started in Vitoria-Gasteiz, and continued in Biscay, these in Navarre, and finally in San Sebastián, the latter ending tragically in 1893. The finance minister, Germán Gamazo, proposed to increase the annual contributions of the four provinces with fueros, authorizing the Government, via Article 17 of the Budget Law, to apply the same contributions and taxes in Navarre and the other Basque provinces as in all other Spanish provinces. The Government of Navarre made a formal protest on May 16 and was seconded by city governments and the press. The delegation sent to Madrid to hold talks with Sagasta and Gamazo ended in failure. The liberal newspaper El Eco de Navarra convened marches in the five merindades of Navarre on May 28. On the following Sunday, another large march was organized in Pamplona.

In this climate, a two-day episode of armed revolt also occurred, starting during the night of June 1–2, led by Sergeant José López Zabalegui, head of the detachment from the Infanta Isabel Fort in Puente la Reina, along with two other soldiers and two residents of Obanos and another two from Puente la Reina. Upon shouting "¡Vivan los fueros!" ("Long live the fueros!), they headed to Arraiza, where they were arrested by forces of the Civil Guard and the army. The sergeant and the two residents of Obanos managed to escape and reach the French border. This event was condemned by El Eco de Navarra, describing it as a "demented act carried out by seven fools", and the Navarrese Government assured the Civil Governor, Andrés García Gómez de la Serna, that this was an isolated incident and that they "unanimously reject violent acts".

The Government, after the altercations in Puente la Reina, did not authorize the march for June 4, 1893. Nevertheless, more the 17,000 people gathered, of all classes and political parties. The Foral Body, accompanied by "distinguished personalities of the sister provinces" went to the Civil Government, located at the time in the Alzugaray House on Paseo de Sarasate, where they were received by Governor García Gómez de la Serna. It was the largest demonstration that had ever been organized in Navarre at the time. The Navarrese Diputación handed out pamphlets asking for "order" and a "unanimous attitude of protest against Article 17 of the Budget Bill. No inappropriate shouting or displays!" However, the economic claims were not the only ones being made, as shown by the different slogans:

- The Diputación: Paz y Fueros (Peace and Fueros).
- The Carlist Circle: Viva Navarra. Vivan los Fueros (Long live Navarre. Long live the Fueros) and Viva Navarra y sus Fueros (Long live Navarre and Her Fueros.
- The Integrista Circle: Fueros. Pacto Ley de 1841 (Fueros. Compromise Law of 1841).
- Republican Circle: La autonomía es la vida de los pueblos (Autonomy is the life of the peoples).
- City of Estella-Lizarra: Vivan las provincias Vasco-Navarras (Long live the Basque-Navarrese Provinces.

The Pamplona Orfeón sang the Gernikako arbola to end the protest. More than 120,000 signatures were collected against the bill, at a time when Navarre had a population of only 300,000. They were presented to Queen Maria Christina on June 7.

The goals were not achieved, and the minister's initiatives were approved by the Congress of Deputies by 99 votes in favor and 8 (those of the Navarrese and the Deputy from Morella). The Navarrese Government had to return to Madrid in 1894 to again negotiate with the central government. These negotiations were also fruitless. When that happened, as recorded by journalist Eustaquio de Echave-Sustaeta in El Partido Carlista y los Fueros (The Carlist Party and the Fueros), the Queen asked General Martínez Campos about the possibility of intervening, and this was the general's response:

Ma'am, if it were another province, we could think about imposing general law, employing force if necessary; if it were Navarre alone, we could still go down that road, but we must understand that Navarre has the three Vascongada provinces on her side, and if force were called against that, all the Basques would have a common cause, and with them, all the Carlists in Spain, who would trigger an uprising in those provinces that would become generalized, and then that would lead again to civil war.

However, since Minister Gamazo had to resign because of the uprising in Cuba and was substituted by Amós Salvador Rodrigáñez, the law never went into effect. The latter presented a similar bill in 1895, but it never even reached the floor for debate.

The defense of the fueros strengthened the union with the other three Basque provinces with similar arrangements, Biscay, Araba, and Gipuzkoa, giving them a common cause and reviving the slogan Laurak bat, the "union of the four", or "four-in-one".

== Monument to the Fueros of Navarre ==
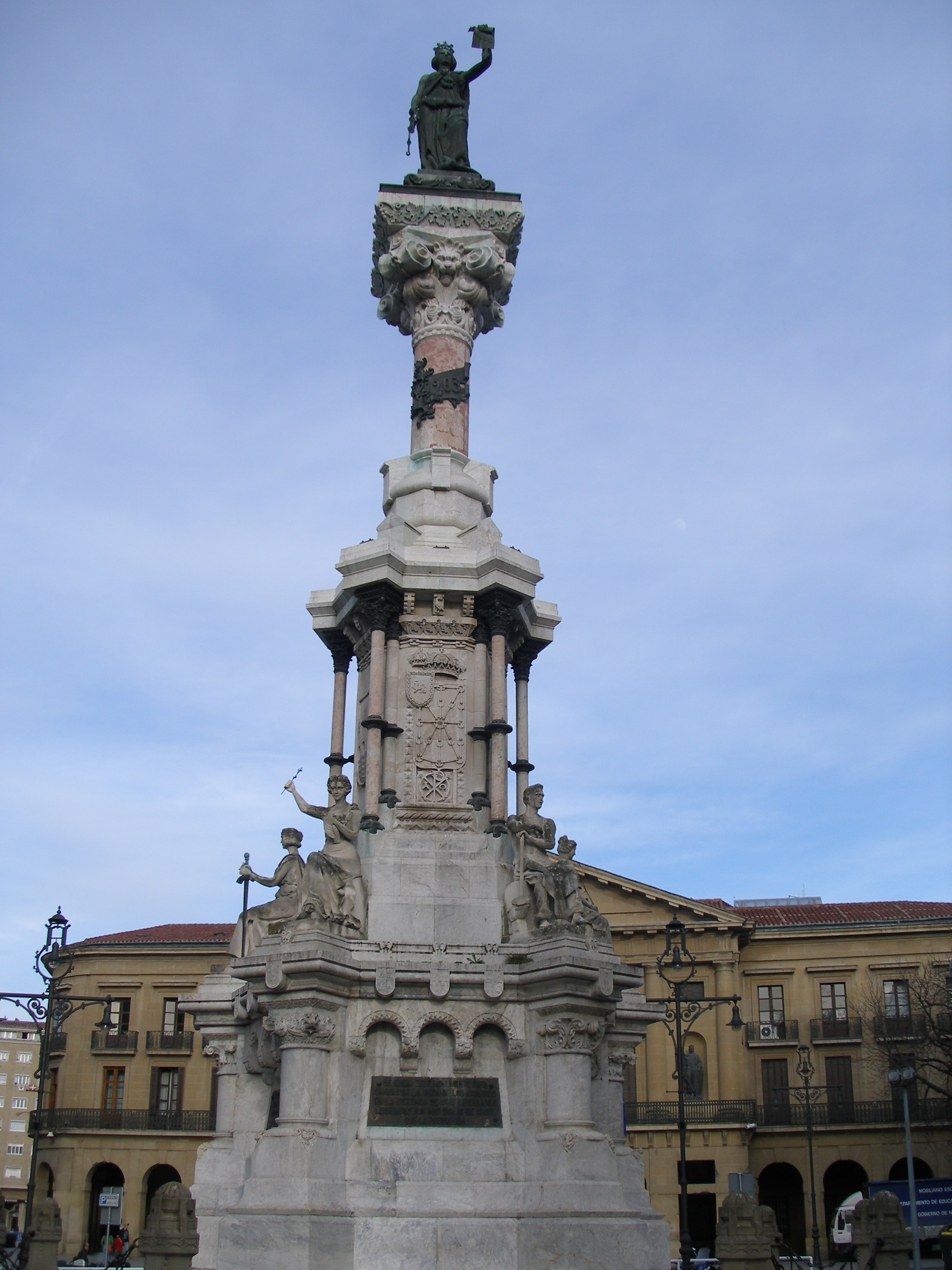
Monument to the Fueros in Pamplona, placed after the Gamazada

To commemorate this event, many towns and cities in Navarre named some of their most important streets and plazas "Fueros". In Pamplona, the people had the Monument to the Fueros erected as a symbol of Navarrese freedom, placing it in front of the Navarrese Government Building. It was designed by architect Manuel Martínez de Ubago and finished in 1903, but never inaugurated.

== Bibliography ==
- "Historia Ilustrada de Navarra" ISBN 84-604-7413-5
- Bixente Serrano Izko "Navarra. Las tramas de la historia" ISBN 84-932845-9-9
- José María Jimeno Jurío. "Navarra, 1917–1919. Reivindicaciones autonómicas y reintegración foral". ISBN 84-7681-402-X.
- Jesús Pablo Chueca Intxusta.- "La Gamazada desde el Nacionalismo Vasco: De la presencia al mito" Príncipe de Viana, ISSN 0032-8472, Año nº 55, Nº 201, 1994, pags. 41–58
