= Spanish Association of Friends of Castles =

The Spanish Association of Friends of Castles (Asociación Española de Amigos de los Castillos, A.E.A.C.) is a non-profit cultural organization founded in 1952 under the Decree of April 22, 1949, which sought to protect Spanish castles, recognizing them as national monuments. This association was promoted by the Marquis of Sales (Antonio del Rosal) the Marquis of Lozoya among others. Today his great-grandchildren, the current Marquis of Sales (Antonio del Rosal y Moreno) and Joaquín Barajas Márquez de Prado are part of this association. Their efforts have allowed the recovery and reconstruction of numerous castles in Spain.
