= Zabalza =

Municipality of Spain

Coordinates: 42°46′02″N 1°48′06″W

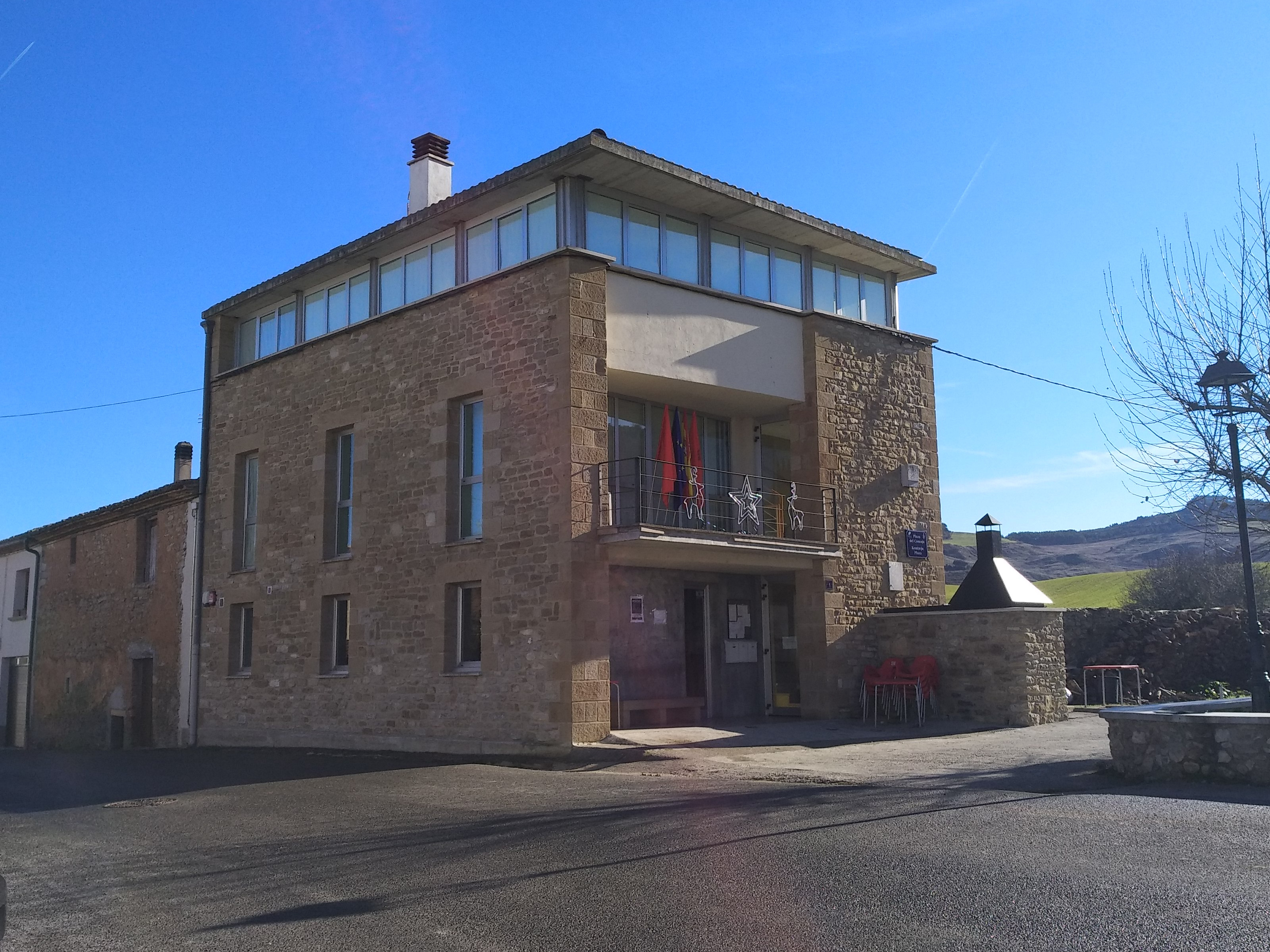

Zabalza is a town and municipality located in the province and autonomous community of Navarre, northern Spain.
