= Arrese =

Arrese is a Spanish surname. Notable people with the surname include:

- Emeterio Arrese (1869–1954), poet
- Felipe Arrese Beitia (1841–1906), Spanish poet and writer
- Jordi Arrese (born 1964), Spanish tennis player
- José Luis de Arrese (1905–1986), Spanish politician
