= Xabier de Lizardi =

Spanish writer

- José María Aguirre Egaña
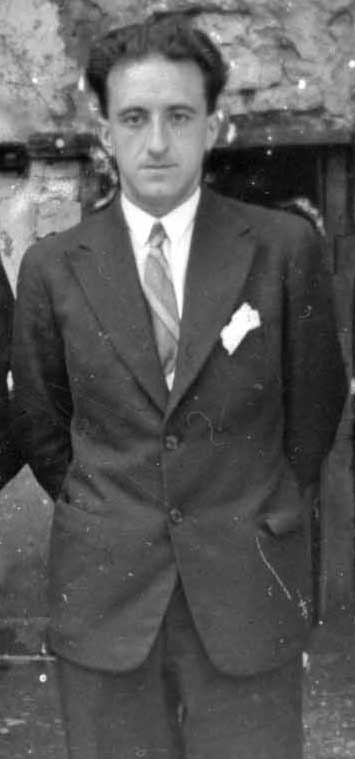
- Born: 1896; Zarauz, Guipuzcoa, Spain
- Died: 1933 (aged 36–37); Tolosa
- Occupation: Writer,
- Writing career
- Language: Spanish, Basque

Xabier Lizardi, or José María Aguirre Egaña (1896–1933) was a Spanish poet and writer in the Basque language. He was the main representative of pre-war Basque literature. His Symbolist aesthetic has elicited comparisons with the poet Juan Ramón Jiménez.

Aguirre signed with the pseudonym Xabier Lizardi by which he is known, although he also signed with those of Zarauztar Sabin and Samaiko Zulo. His scarce work, focused mainly on only two books, Biotz-begietan ('In the heart and in the eye's) written in 1932 and the posthumous anthology Umezurtz-olerkiak ('Orphan Poems') published in 1934, in which he captures an intimate type of poetry. His work marks the transition from Romanticism to Symbolism in Basque literature.

== Biography ==
In 1917, at the age of 21, Xabier de Lizardi graduated in law from the Complutense University of Madrid. In 1926 he participated in the founding of the Euskaltzaleak cultural entity within which he carried out different projects. In 1930 he participated in the Basque poetry contest in Errenteria, where he presented his poems Otartxo utsa ('The empty basket'), Paris'ko Txolarre ('The sparrow of Paris') and Agur ('Goodbye'). At the following year's contest held in Tolosa in honor of the poet Emeterio Arrese, he presented the poem Urtegiroak ('The seasons of the year'). This poem has been described as "his masterpiece" by Ariztimuño.

In 1932 Lizardi published the book Biotz-Begietan ('In the heart and in the eyes') and was awarded the Kirikiño prize for the article Etxe barne bizia ('Life inside the house'). The works Laño ta izar ('Fog and star') and Bi aizpak ('Two Sisters') also saw the light in the magazine Antzerti ('Theater').

At 36 years of age, he died in Tolosa on 12 March 1933.

The books Umezurtz-Olerkiak ('Orphan Poems') and Itz-Lauz ('In Plain Words') were published after his death as well as his dramatic works Ezkondu ezin ziteken mutilla ('The boy who could not marry') that appeared in Egan magazine in 1953.

== Bibliography ==
=== Poetry ===
- XX. mendeko poesia kaierak (20th century poetry notebooks), 2000, Susa : Edition of Koldo Izagirre.
- Biotz-begietan (In the heart and in the eyes), 1932, Greens-Atxirika .
- Olerkiak (poems) 1983, Erein : edited by Juan Mari Lekuona, Ángel Lertxundi and Xabier Lete.
- Umezurtz olerkiak (Orphan Poems) 1934, Euskaltzaleak
- Lizardi (braking), 1975, Valverde .

=== Theater ===
- Bi aizpak (Two sisters), 1932, Antzerti .
- Laño ta izar (Fog and star), 1932, Antzerti
- Ezkondu ezin ziteken mutilla (The boy who could not marry), 1953, Egan Magazine

=== Articles ===
- Itz lauz , (In plain words) 1934, Euskaltzaleak .
- Kazetari lanak (journalist works), 1986, Erein – Association of Basque publishers )
