= Felipe Arrese Beitia =

Spanish poet and writer

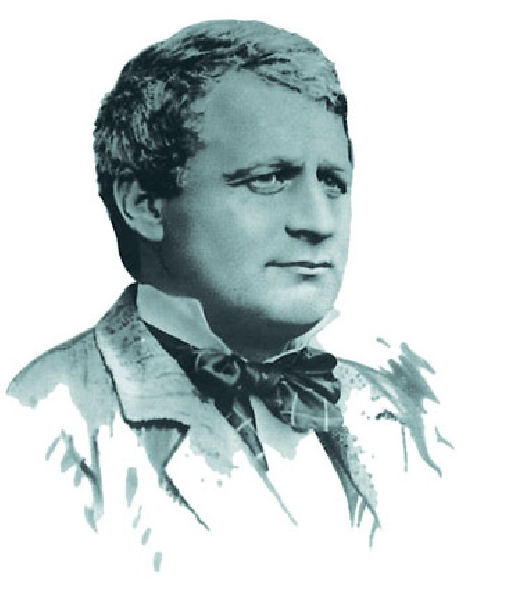
- Born: 25 May 1841 Otxandio, Spain
- Died: January 16, 1906 (aged 64) Otxandio, Spain
- Occupation: Poet; Writer

Felipe Arrese Beitia (1841 – 1906), born in Otxandio, was a Spanish poet, writer and sculptor, from Biscay. He wrote elegies about the perceived imminent demise of the Basque language. He also studied painting in the city of Vitoria.

== Career ==
Arrese was not well-educated, but was very religious. After beginning his education in Otxandio at the age of seven, he left school at thirteen to help his father in the workshop. There he would continue with his passion for sculpture, a passion he had had from an early age, sculpting crosses. Three years later, he travelled to Vitoria to learn the trade, under the guidance of sculptor Marcos Ordozgoiti Murua. He balanced his day job in the workshop with his study of drawing at night. As a hardworking student, Arrese came top of his year, although this and the teacher's preference for him provoked hostility from some classmates, prompting him to return to Otxandio at eighteen years old to open his own workshop. His experiences in Vitoria are mentioned in the poem Bitoria'ko Uria.

Given his aptitude for drawing and sculpture, the Vizcaya Regional Council offered him a scholarship to study in Rome, which he declined owing to the incompatibility of his faith and morals with such a residency. From 1865 he carried out his work as a sculptor of religious objects in various Basque towns, such as Oñati, Vitoria, San Sebastián, Aramaio, Abadiño, Arantzazu, Urkiola, and Iurreta, among others, though few of his works have survived into the 21st century.

In 1865, his first poem was published and he began to write poetry for the magazine Euskara at the request of the publication's creator and editor, Arturo Campión, whom he visited at his home in Otxandio. There, in the second-floor library, Arrese would write his poems. He also worked as a sculpting teacher, balancing this profession with his love for poetry and Basque.

In 1871 he married Ángela Bengoa with whom he had six children, two of whom survived. In 1873, during the Third Carlist War, despite being a Carlist sympathiser, he declared himself an antimilitarist and moved to San Sebastián. In this period, in 1874, he published a manual of Biscayan grammar and vocabulary: Diccionario y Manual Bascongado y Castellano y Elementos de Gramática. At this time, he met José Manterola, founder and editor of the magazine Euskal-Erria, in which his poems were published, some translated into Spanish. Arrese dedicated several poems to Manterola, as a reflection of their friendship, such as "Nere erriko ujola", and after Manterola's death, "Nire adiskide laztan", "Manterolaren eriotzea" and "Euskal festa onen asmatzalle eta gidari On Jose Manterola zanari koroitzea".

After three years in San Sebastián, Arrese's family returned to Otxandio. There, in 1874, his wife, who had been proofreading his poems for years, died. Arrese dedicated the poems "Anjela", "Eriotzea" and "Illetea" to her. As his sons were still young, he remarried Gabriela Iturrieta.

He made friends with numerous Basque enthusiasts: his friendship with Captain Duvoisin was established at the Elizondo Floral Games. He was also a good friend of Antoine D'Abbadie, the organiser of and driving force behind the Floral Games (Lore Jokoak in Basque). He also maintained friendly relationships with Arturo Campión, José Manterola, Antonio Arzak (Manterola's successor as editor of Euskal-Erria), and with López Alen (Arzak's successor). He sent his poems to Resurrección María de Azkue for publication in the magazine Euskalzale. The two men discussed philology and language, and Azkue took Arrese's opinions into consideration when writing; he mentioned him among the Biscayan collaborators in the introduction to the Diccionario Vasco-Español-Francés. Arrese also maintained epistolary relationships with Sabino Arana, Ramón de la Sota, Juan Carlos Guerra Menéndez Pelayo and Emilia Pardo Bazán.

In his old age, a heart condition made him abandon his sculpting trade, and he survived his final years with the financial aid of a group of wealthy Basque nationalists.

== Work ==
According to Mikel Aizpuru Murua, "his work, in addition to being full of Biblical reminiscences and the familiar themes of the fueros, traditional values and love for the earth, stands out for two reasons: first, the radical, agonising confrontation between disappearing traditional Basque society and external forces, be they Castile or Spain; and second, the emphasis placed on the Basque language, the symbol and bastion of Vasconia, inseparable from the issue of regionality."

== Awards and recognition ==
- 1879, Prize in the "Juegos Florales de Elizondo" for his composition Ama Euskeriari azken agurrak.
- 1881, Prize in the "Juegos Florales de Irún" for his composition Jaungoikoa eta fueroak y por Danok Bat.
