= Gernikako Arbola (anthem) =

Unofficial anthem (1853) of the Basques by Jose Maria Iparragirre

English: "The Tree of Gernika"
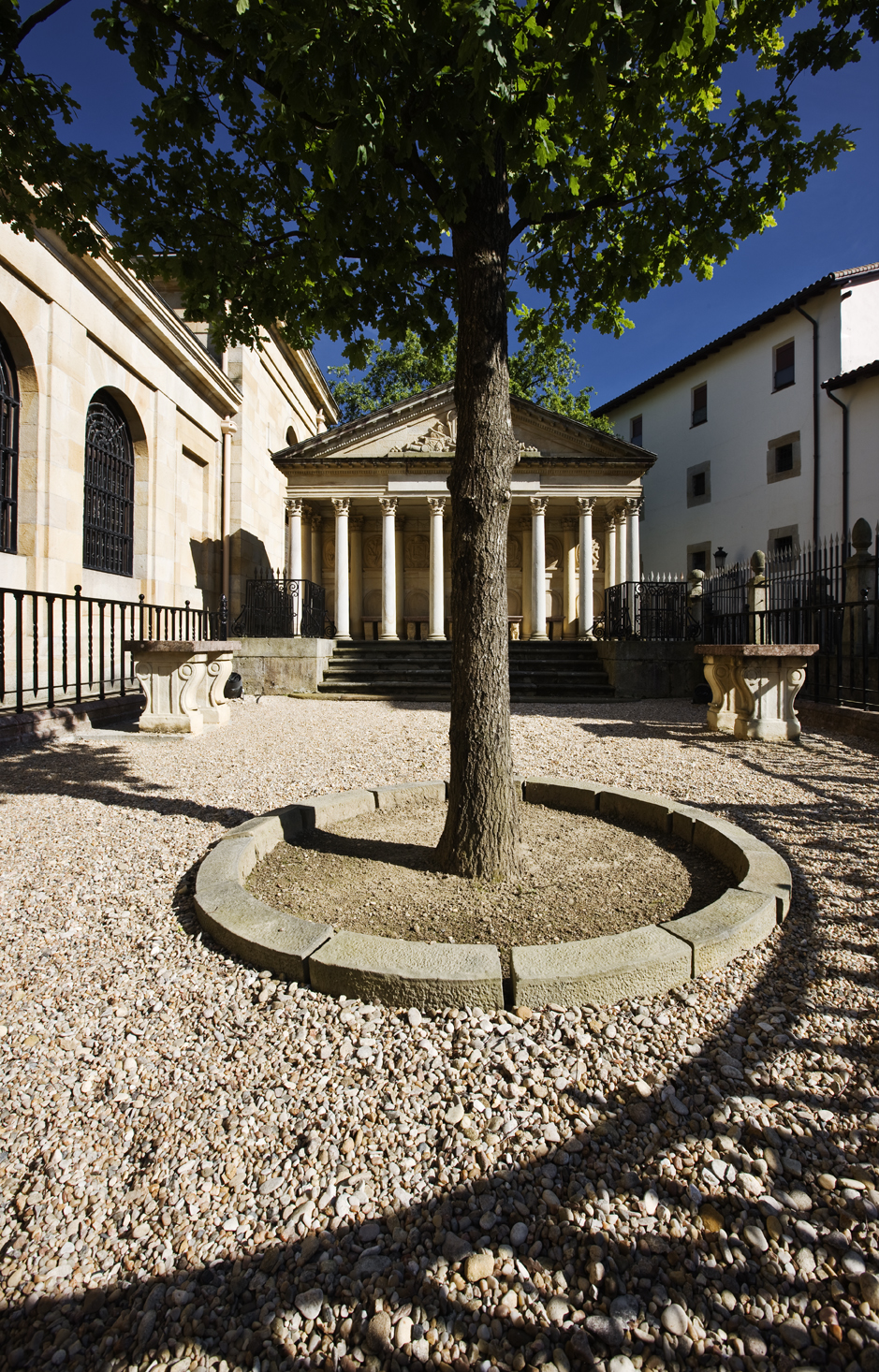
- The Tree of Gernika
- National anthem of the Basque Country (Spain, France)
- Lyrics: José María Iparraguirre, 1853
- Music: José María Iparraguirre, 1853

Audio sample
- Gernikako Arbola: file; help

"Gernikako Arbola" is the title of a song in bertso form presented both in Madrid (1853) and by the shrine of Saint Anthony at Urkiola (1854) by the Basque bard José María Iparraguirre, celebrating the Tree of Gernika and the Basque liberties. The song is the unofficial anthem of the Basques, but only the first stanza is sung as the Basque anthem. In 2007, the General Assembly of Biscay declared it the district's official anthem.

The song was popularized by Iparraguirre throughout the Basque Country and the Basque diaspora in the Americas during his emigration to the continent. It was thus adopted and sung by the Basques during critical and significant historic chapters, like the end of the last Carlist War, the Gamazada, or the Spanish Civil War.

== History ==
The popularity of the song quickly expanded (sung by the bard in Madrid venues) on the heat of the pro-fueros movement in the run-up to their definite suppression (1876) and the political unrest following it. Its echo quickly spread to the French Basque Country, where it took hold spurred by the Lore Jokoak festivals, the "Floral Games".

The song was chosen for the solemn end to the demonstration held at Pamplona in 1893, and sang along by the crowds, after widespread indignation sparked at the Spanish government's breach of fiscal terms concerning Navarre—protests known as the Gamazada.

The local newspaper La Voz de Fitero (southern fringes of Navarre) reported on the cheerful official reception in honour of the district MP Ramon Lasanta held on 30 April 1913, where an enthusiast audience sang the "Gernikako Arbola" along, and demanded an encore from the music band.

The anthem was often rendered in performances by Pablo de Sarasate and Julián Gayarre. It has been called the "Marseillaise of the Basques". The tree has also inspired a passage of La prudencia en la mujer by the Spanish playwright Tirso de Molina and a sonnet of William Wordsworth.

In 2007, as set out by the 4/2007 Chartered Decision, the General Assembly of Biscay declared it the district's official anthem.

== Lyrics ==
There are versions with four, eight or twelve stanzas. Also, Iparragirre as a bertsolari would introduce changes during his performances. However, only the first stanza became widespread and popular as an anthem.

Original Gipuzkoan text	Text in Standard Basque	English
First stanza
Guernicaco arbola Da bedeincatuba Euscaldunen artean Guztiz maitatuba: Eman ta zabaltzazu Munduban frutuba, Adoratzen zaitugu Arbola santuba.	Gernikako arbola Da bedeinkatua Euskaldunen artean Guztiz maitatua: Eman ta zabal zazu Munduan frutua, Adoratzen zaitugu Arbola santua.	The Tree of Guernica is blessed among the Basques; absolutely loved. Give and deliver the fruit unto the world. We adore you, holy tree.
Second stanza
Milla urte inguruda Esaten dutela Jaincoac jarrizubela Guernicaco arbola: Saude bada zutican Orain da dembora, Eroritzen bacera Arras galduguera.	Mila urte inguru da Esaten dutela Jainkoak jarri zuela Gernikako arbola: Zaude bada zutikan Orain da denbora, Eroritzen bazera Erraz galdu gera.	About one thousand years, they say, since God planted it, the Guernica tree: Stand, so, now is the time If you fall we will perish easily.
Third stanza
Etzera erorico Arbola maitea, Baldin portatzen bada Vizcaico juntia: Lauroc artuco degu Surequin partia Paquian bici dedin Euscaldun gendia.	Ez zara eroriko Arbola maitea, Baldin portatzen bada Bizkaiko juntua: Laurok hartuko dugu Zurekin partea Bakean bizi dedin Euskaldun jentea.	You will not fall, dear tree, if the Biscay assembly behaves: We four will take your party so that the Basque people live in peace.
Fourth stanza
Betico bicidedin Jaunari escatzeco Jarri gaitecen danoc Laster belaunico: Eta biotzetican Escatu esquero Arbola bicico da Orain eta guero.	Betiko bizi dedin Jaunari eskatzeko Jarri gaitezen denok Laster belauniko: Eta bihotzetikan Eskatu ez gero Arbola biziko da Orain eta gero.	So that it lives forever, to ask the Lord, let us all kneel down quickly: and from the heart, by asking, the tree will live now and forever.
Fifth stanza
Arbola botatzia Dutela pentzatu Euscal erri guztiyan Denac badakigu: Ea bada gendia Dembora orain degu, Erori gabetanic Iruqui biagu.	Arbola botatzea Dutela pentsatu Euskal Herri guztian Denak badakigu: Ea bada jentea Denbora orain dugu, Erori gabedanik Iruki biagu.	That they have thought to fell the tree in the Basque Country we all know. So, people, now is the time! We have to hold it up and not let it fall.
Sixth stanza
Beti egongocera Uda berricua, Lore ainciñetaco Mancha gabecoa: Erruquisaitez bada Biotz gurecoa, Dembora galdu gabe Emanic frutuba.	Beti egongo zara Udaberrikoa, Lore aintzinetako Mantxa gabekoa: Erruki zaitez bada Bihotz gurekoa, Denbora galdu gabe Emanik frutua.	You will always be of spring, without the stain of the flowers of old. Have mercy, you of our heart, losing no time, give fruit.
Seventh stanza
Arbolac erantzun du Contuz bicitzeko, Eta biotzetican Jaunari escatzeco: Guerraric nai ez degu Paquea betico, Gure legue zuzenac Emen maitatzeco.	Arbolak erantzun du Kontuz bizitzeko, Eta bihotzetikan Jaunari eskatzeko: Gerrarik nahi ez dugu Bakea betiko, Gure lege zuzenak Emen maitatzeko.	The tree answered that we should live carefully and in our hearts ask the Lord: We do not want wars [but] peace forever, to love here our fair laws.
Eighth stanza
Erregutu diogun Jaungoico jaunari Paquea emateco Orain eta beti: Bay eta indarrare Cedorren lurrari Eta bendiciyoa Euscal erriyari.	Erregutu diogun Jaungoiko jaunari Bakea emateko Orain eta beti: Bai eta indarra ere Zetorren lurrari Eta benedizioa Euskal Herriari.	We ask of the Lord God that he gives us peace, now and forever: and strength as well to His land and the blessing for the Basque land.
Ninth stanza
Orain cantaditzagun Laubat bertzo berri Gure provinciaren Alabantzagarri: Alabac esaten du Su garrez beteric Nere biotzecua Eutzico diat nic.	Orain kanta ditzagun Laubat bertso berri Gure probintziaren Alabantzagarri: Arabak esaten du Sukarriz beterik Nere bihotzekoa Eutsiko diat nik.	Now let us sing four new verses in praise of our province: Alava says full of fever the one of my heart I will keep.
Tenth stanza
Guipúzcoa urrena Arras sentituric Asi da deadarrez Ama Guernicari: Erori etzeitzen Arrimatu neri Zure cendogarriya Emen nacazu ni.	Gipuzkoa hurrena Arras sentiturik Hasi da deiadarrez Ama Gernikari: Erori etzeitzen Arrimatu niri Zure zendogarria Hemen naukazu ni.	Gipuzkoa next, very moved, has started with the call to mother Guernica: Do not fall: come near me! Your strengthener you have in me!
Eleventh stanza
Ostoa verdia eta Zañac ere fresco, Nere seme maiteac Ez naiz erorico: Beartzen banaiz ere Egon beti pronto Nigandican etzayac Itzurerazoco.	Hostoa berdea eta Zainak ere fresko, Nere seme maiteak Ez naiz eroriko: Behartzen banaiz ere Egon beti pronto Nigandikan etsaiak Itzularaziko.	The green leaf and the fresh veins, my dear sons, I will not let fall: If I need it to be always ready the enemies around me to force into retreat.
Twelfth stanza
Guztiz maitagarria Eta oestarguiña Beguiratu gaitzasu Ceruco erreguiña Guerraric gabetanic Bici albaguiña. Oraindaño izandegu Guretzaco diña."	Guztiz maitagarria Eta ostargina Begiratu gaitzazu Zeruko erregina Gerrarik gabedanik Bizi ahal bagina. Oraindaino izan dugu Guretzako dina."	Always lovable and sky light, look at us, Queen of Heaven without war so that we can. She has been until now good to us.

== In film ==
A tune based on the anthem can be heard in a test bullfight scene of The Happy Thieves, a film shot in Spain in 1961.
