= Sanctuary of Urkiola =

Catholic temple in Urkiola, Basque Country (Spain)

Coordinates: 43°05′58″N 2°38′37″W

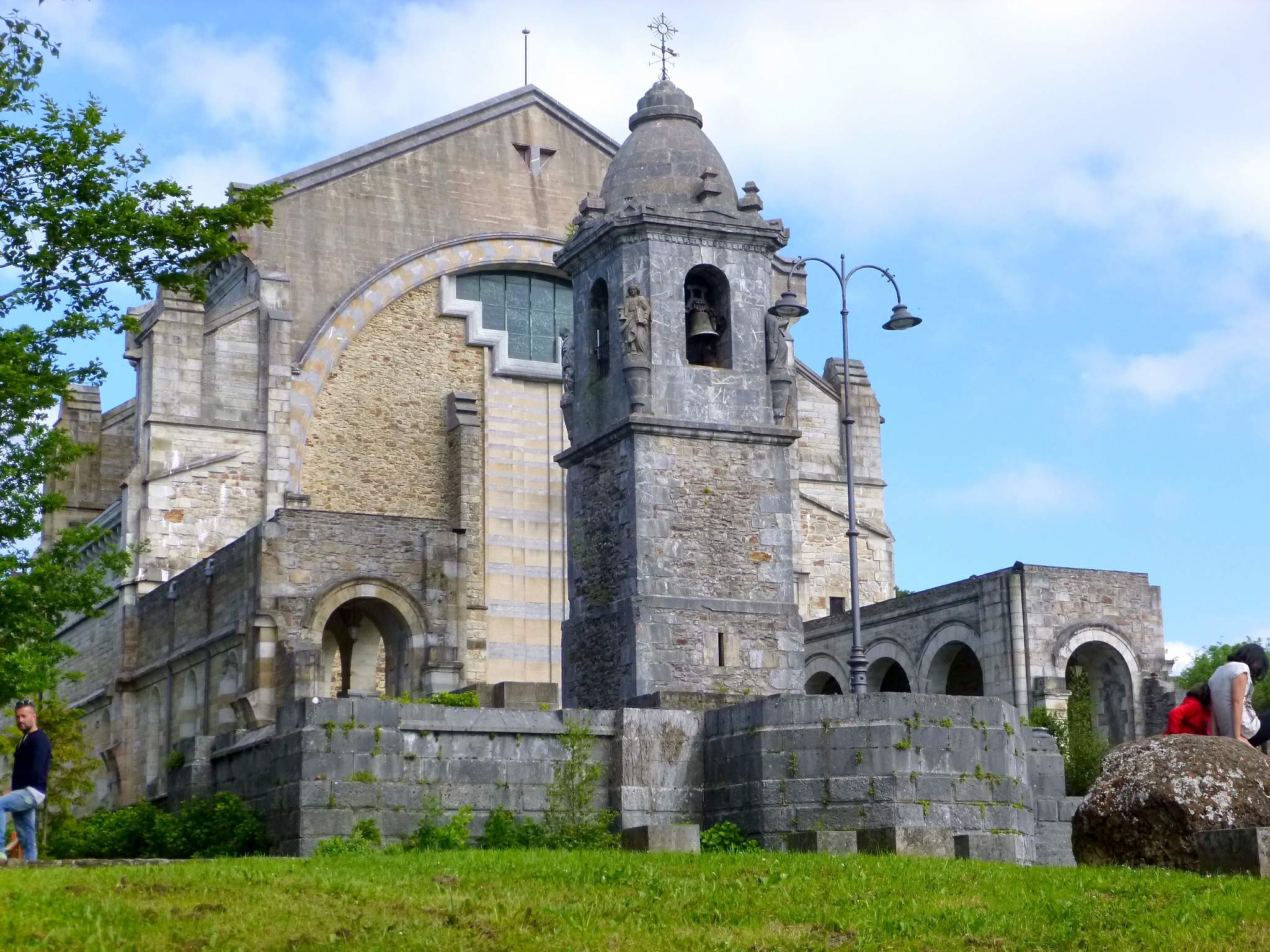
Sanctuary of the two Saints Anthony of Urkiola.

The Sanctuary of Saint Anthony the Abbot and Saint Anthony of Padua of Urkiola is a Catholic temple located in the hill and port of Urkiola, in the Biscayan municipality of Abadiño, in the Basque Country, Spain. It is unknown exactly how old the Sanctuary is, but according to some documents, it could have been between the 8th and 11th centuries, making it one of the oldest of the region. It is located at the heart of the Urkiola Natural Park, next to one of the historical routes linking the Cantabrian coast with the Castilian plateau and surrounded by a lush nature in which the limestone walls of the mountains of Durangaldea stand out as a background, with the Anboto as the highest altitude, where Basque mythology places the main dwelling of its highest deity, Mari (called the "Lady of Anboto").

The present structure, the third one known to exist, is an unfinished building in neo-medieval style that was begun in 1899 and consecrated in 1933. This building, together with a small bell tower erected in 1870, the rectory, the old hospital and the hospice, make up the religious complex, which is complemented by two small old chapels, the Santo Cristo and Santa Polonia, a Stations of the Cross and Calvary built in 1943, and the small cemetery in the rural neighborhood.

== The Sanctuary ==
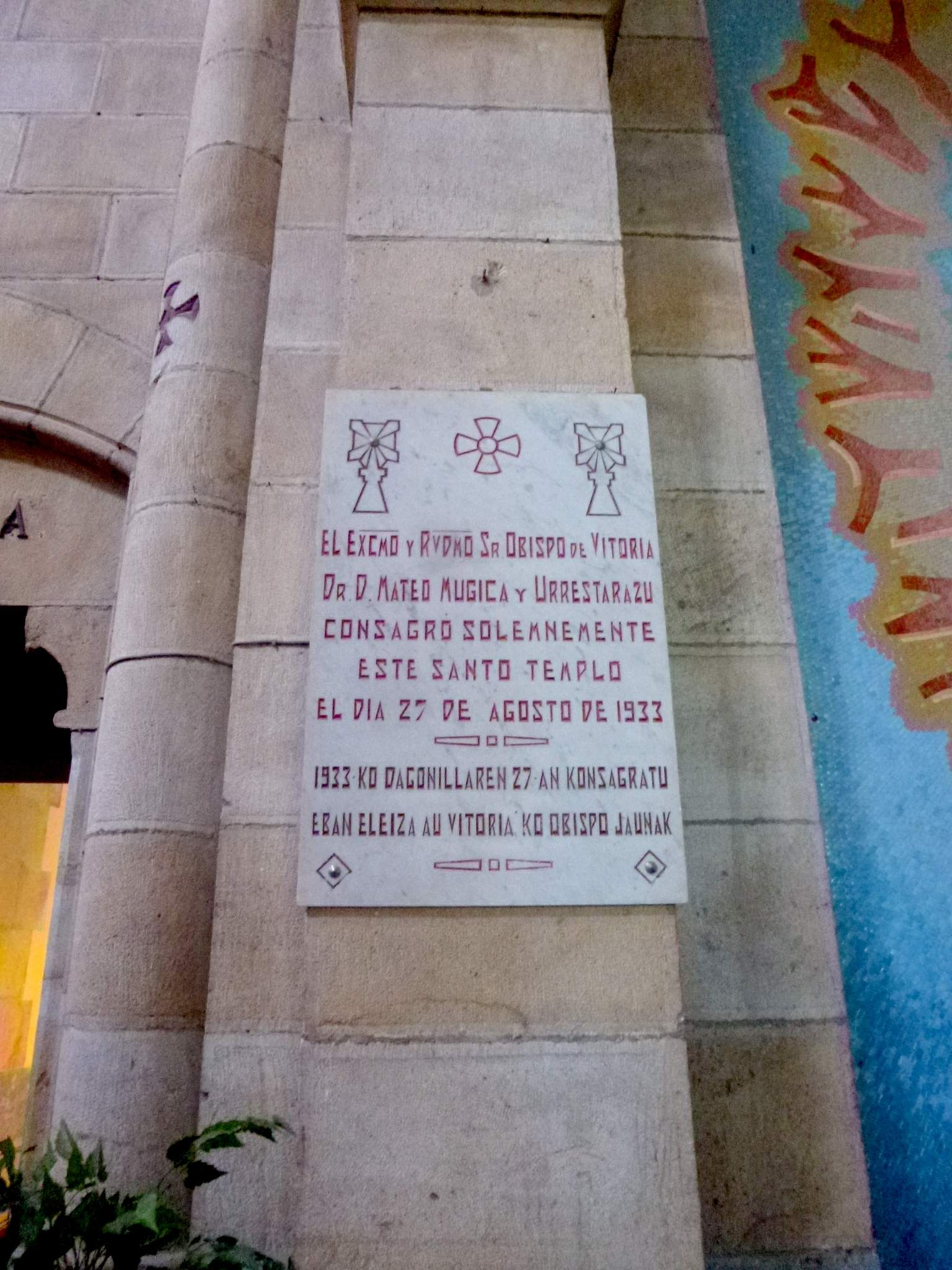
Memorial plaque of the consecration of the Sanctuary in 1933.

The sanctuary is right on the dividing line of the Mediterranean and Cantabrian slopes, so that the water that falls on one side of its roof goes to the Mediterranean Sea and the water that falls on the other side goes to the Cantabrian Sea.

The disproportion between the enormous construction of the unfinished naves and the small bell tower of the previous temple draws the attention of the visitors. A large staircase serves as access to the church, whose entrance is flanked by the unfinished walls of which would have been the towers and the portico.

The central nave forms a garden in which rises the small bell tower of neoclassical style, in the part that has not been occupied for worship. Among the different plants that adorn it, a small monument commemorating the lifestyles of Vizcaya has been erected. This monument is made up of an anchor, a laia and a stone turbine that symbolize the seafaring, agricultural and industrial life of Biscay, respectively.

Going up to the left, just at the entrance of the sanctuary, a rare stone (which many say is a meteorite), invites single people to go around it seven times clockwise, as it is believed that one will find a partner if they do so (if the turns are made backward, it is said that it has the opposite effect).

The side naves are now aisles that give access to the temple. The central nave has been closed with a large wall to form the space dedicated to liturgical use.

The church was designed in neo-medieval style and oriented to the use. As the work was left unfinished, the position of the altar was changed and it was turned upside down, leaning against the great wall that closes the nave. The rectangular landscape chancel has given place to the choir, and on its sides are the sacristy and a chapel dedicated to the Blessed Sacrament.

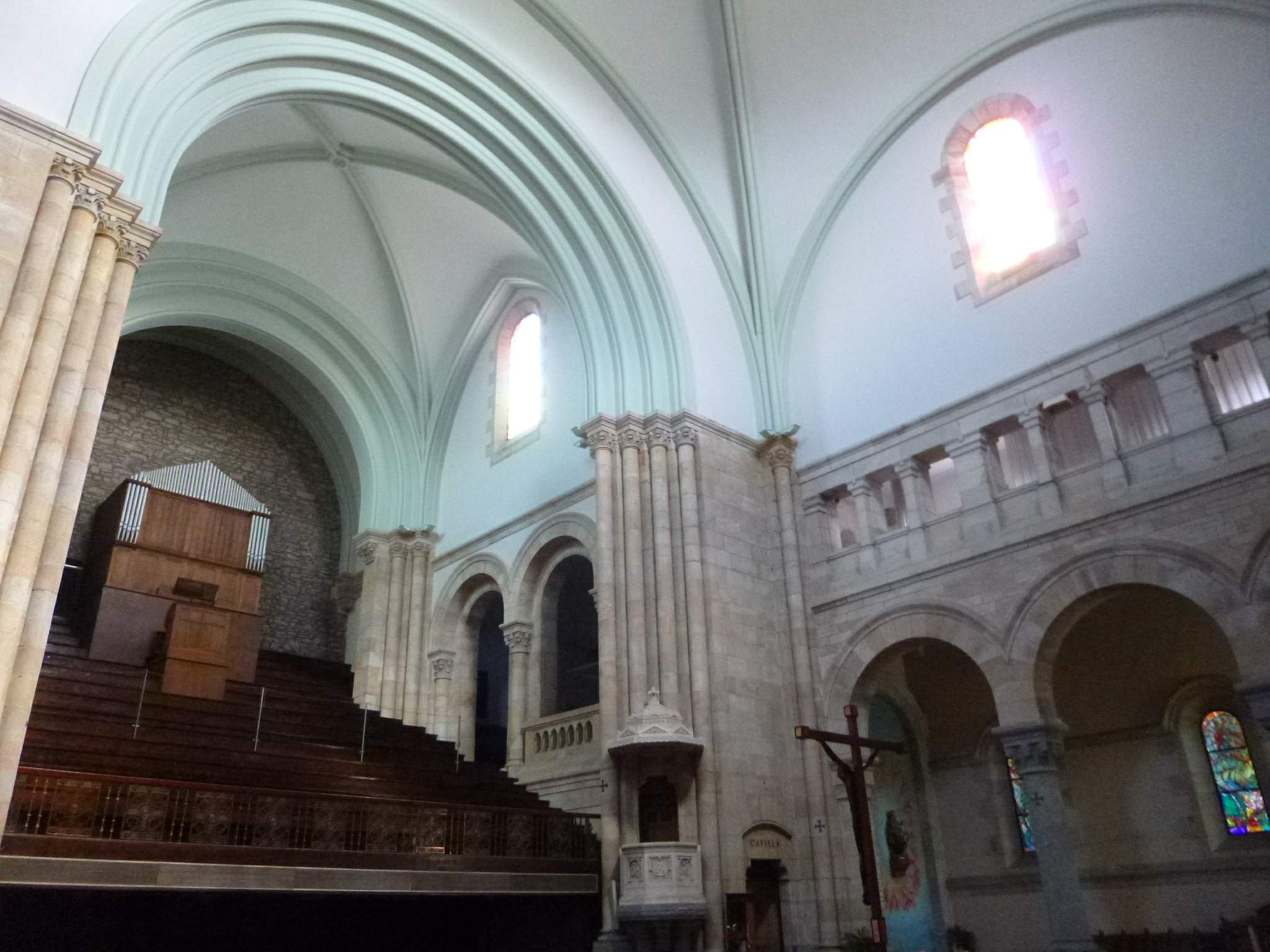
View of the back of the church: choir loft and organ.

In the late 20th century, different renovations were carried out to finish off the unfinished work. These works, both on the exterior and interior, were promoted by the group of ex-missionaries belonging to the Basque diocesan missions, who took charge of the sanctuary in May 1970.

On the exterior, the large access staircase was built and the top of the wall that closes the main nave was smoothed.

In the interior, the walls that form the back of the altar were decorated with mosaics. For the main altar a large mosaic has been built covering the wall that closes the nave and on which a stained glass window has been opened with the figures of the two Saints Anthony, the Abbot and of Padua. Another mosaic has covered the chapel of the Blessed Sacrament and a Stations of the Cross has been made on the floor of the nave, to which the Station of the Resurrection has been added. These mosaics and the Stations of the Cross were made in the sanctuary's own workshop.

=== Imagery ===
The sanctuary has suffered several fires over the years, but among the sanctuary's collection there are several outstanding images.

- The images of the patron saints, Saint Anthony the Abbot and Saint Anthony of Padua, are of rococo style and date from the 17th century, as they are already mentioned in the inventory of 1605. The historian Labayru attributes them to the Elgoibar sculptor Juan de Iturriza, who was the author of the altarpiece of the previous temple and who delivered them in 1679. Both are 1.10 m high with pedestals of 50 cm. They were made to be in the niche of an altar and not for procession. There is a written reference of 1665 where it indicates that they had attire of clothes and dresses.
- Carving of the Virgin Mary and child, donated by the Diocesan Museum of Bilbao. It is a Renaissance carving showing a seated image carrying the child on her lap.
- Christ crucified, image of Renaissance style of the 16th century. It was part of the Vera Cruz of Durango.
- Carving of Saint Anthony the abbot, from the previous temple in which it is known that it occupied a side altar and that in 1690 it was moved to preside over the so-called "Cloister of the Pilgrims", where the different votive offerings that the faithful left in gratitude for different favors performed were collected.
- The image of St. Peter, made in bronze, is a scale reproduction of the image of St. Peter in the Vatican City.

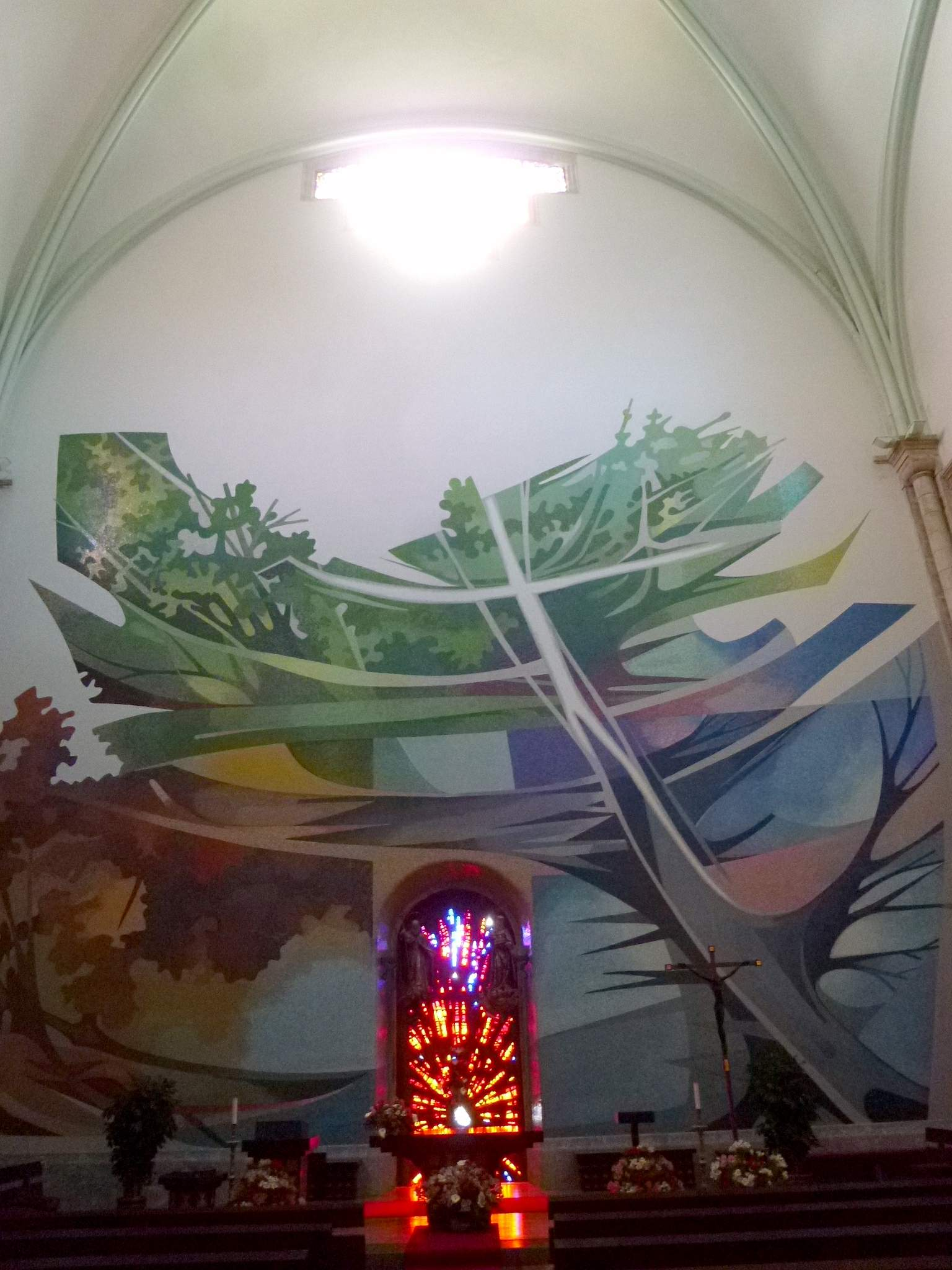
Head of the temple; the front wall, behind the main altar, is decorated with a mosaic composed of more than 850,000 pieces.

=== Mosaics ===
In the 1990s, the back walls of the altars were covered with mosaics, both in the main altar and in the chapel of the Holy Sacrament.

- Mosaic of the High Altar (inaugurated in 1996): this work is intended to cover the big wall that closes the central nave and that serves as background to the high altar and is a work of the lay missionary Peli Romarategui that was designed by the priest José María Muñoz. It occupies 170 m^{2} and has more than 850,000 pieces that were made in the sanctuary itself. Its construction took more than two years. It represents an allegory of the cross turned into a tree that goes through the four seasons of the year. It is the course of man through his four times and the flowering of life represented by the Resurrected Jesus.
- Mosaic of the chapel of the Santísimo: it is of smaller size than that of the High Altar and was made by the same artists. It is the frame to place the carving of the crucified Christ. On a brown background there is a Greek Cross, like a nuclear mushroom clouds or the smoke of an erupting volcano, symbolizing injustice and wars. On the sides are located, in niches, the figures of the two Saints Anthony: on the right Saint Anthony of Padua and on the left Saint Anthony the Abbot. Under it is the tabernacle. Under the crucified Christ it states in Basque: gora Jainkoa zeruetan, gora itsaso mendietan ('glory (above) to God in the skies, glory (above) to God in the seas and in the mountains').
- Other mosaics: in the chapel is a mosaic that frames the image of the Virgin and child and, then, next to the door of the sacristy, in a simple mosaic, the names of the Basque saints are collected.
- Stations of the Cross: a Stations of the Cross has been made and placed on the floor of the main nave. Made as a mosaic but with large pieces and made in the sanctuary itself, it has the characteristic that it has one more station, that of the resurrection.
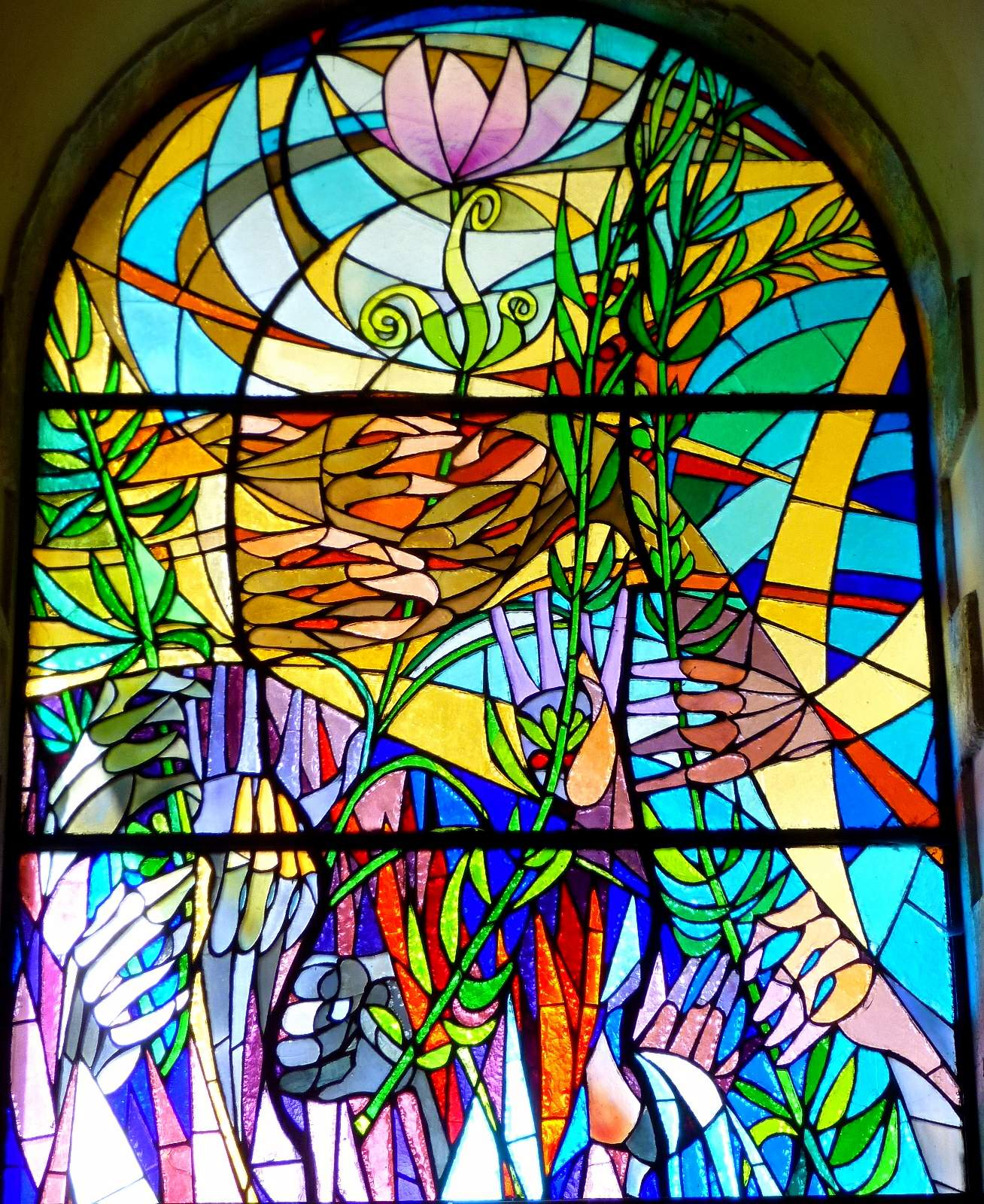

=== Stained glass ===
Along with the mosaics, several stained glass windows were made. The main one adorns the High altar and the images of the two Saints Anthony have been placed on them.

- Stained glass of the High Altar: at the base of the wall, behind the High Altar, right in its center, begins this stained glass window that is striking for its colorfulness. It symbolizes the explosion of a grenade and brings the memory of the horror of war, especially the Spanish Civil War that left many dead in this place. It is the work of the glassmakers from Bilbao Cañadas. At the top of the wall opens a hole that has been covered with a stained glass window symbolizing the dove of peace. Work of Gabriel Ramos Uranga and made in the art workshops of Cuenca.

Other stained glass windows were designed by José María Muñoz and made by Peli Romarategui, in a workshop in the sanctuary itself:

- Stained glass of the access doors: on one of the access doors there are stained glass windows showing the silhouette of the sanctuary. On another shows several hands in different positions holding a sprouting plant.
- Next to the sacristy and the chapel, as well as above the choir, there are sets of stained glass windows depicting the natural vegetation of the surroundings. They show different species of trees and plants.
- Stained glass of the walls: there are several sets of stained glass windows that close the different openings in the walls. On the side walls there are four stained glass windows showing motifs of the four classical elements, water, air, fire and earth.

== History ==
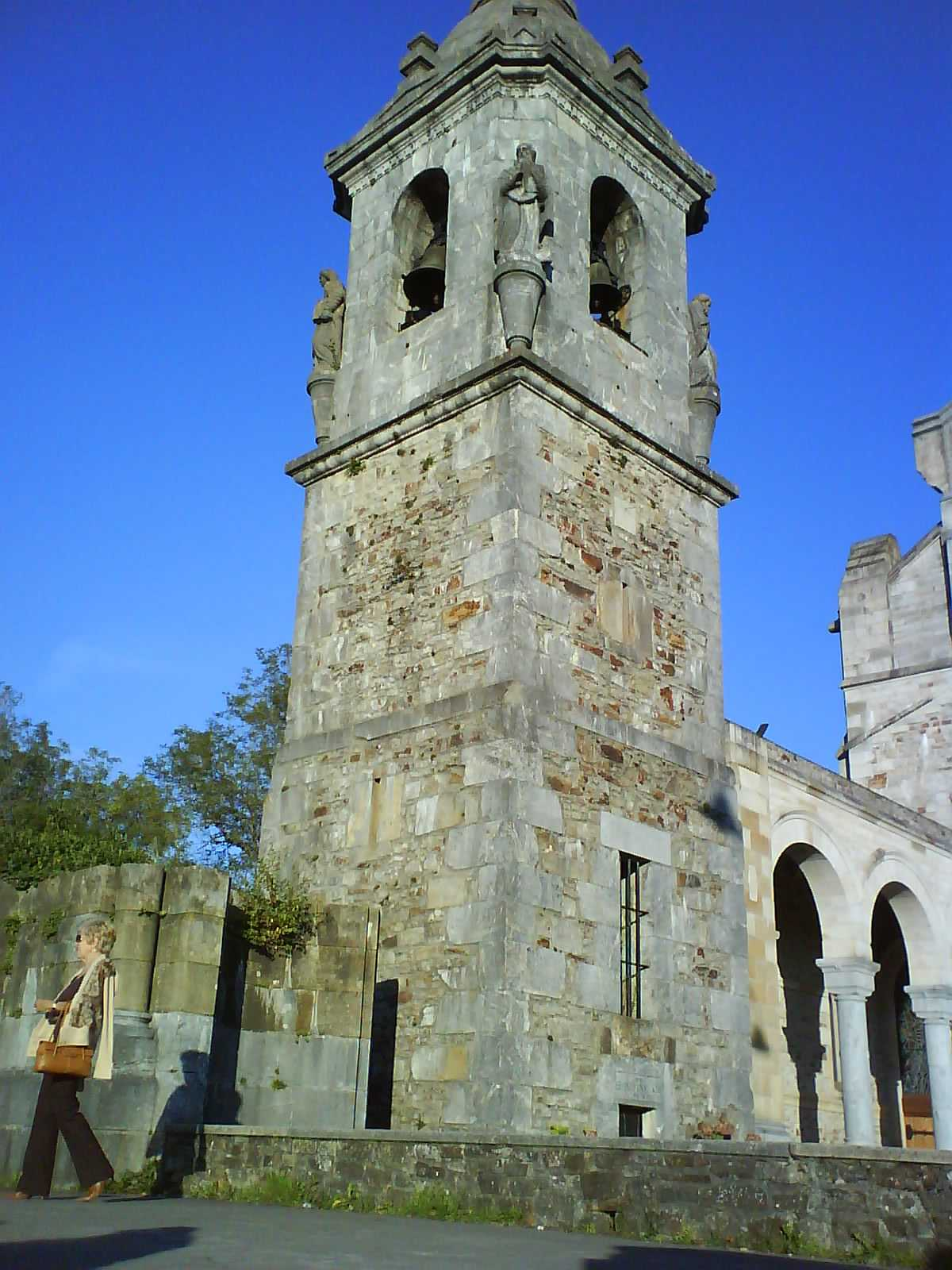
Sanctuary of the two Saints Anthony of Urkiola, detail of the bell tower.

The Urkiola area has been relevant in the beliefs of the inhabitants of these lands since prehistoric times. In its surroundings there are abundant archaeological remains and in its maximum height, the Anboto, the autochthonous mythology has located the residence of its maximum figure, Mari numen main of the pre-Christian Basque mythology.

The entry of Christianity did not erase the previous beliefs, which remained incarnated in the new creed. Therefore, the Urkiola site has always had a strong spiritual and religious expression. Even in the absence of documentation or archaeological findings to support it, it is estimated that the antiquity of the cult in this place is prior to the Middle Ages and is linked to the entry of Christianity in these lands.

The sanctuary of Saints Anthony the Abbot and of Padua was built on a primitive and simple hermitage dedicated to St. Anton, of which there are written references around 1212 when the Infanta Urraca indicated the alms for the hermitage. There are also more references to the year 1567 (one of the rectors of the sanctuary, Benito de Vizcarra, says he can fix the origin of the sanctuary between the 8th and 9th centuries from the legacies that appeared in a document of the will of the County of Durango in the 13th century) and in the 17th century. From the original building it is known that its altar faced east and was located at the entrance of the current temple and that it had a bell tower and portico. Since the 13th century the sanctuary is dedicated to the two Saints Anthony.

In 1308 Juan Alonso de Múxica is recorded as protector of the sanctuary. In 1567, apart from the hermitage, the complex was already composed of a house and a hospital and required an income of 61 ducats for its maintenance expenses.

In 1625, construction began on a church to replace the hermitage, also dedicated to St. Anthony of Padua. The works were entrusted to Antonio López de Traña with whom Martín de Arriluceaga worked in masonry and Baptista de Orbea in carpentry.

In June 1646 the new church was inaugurated with a Latin cross plan with a single nave and dome. This church remained open for worship for 15 years. In 1553 the cloister was built, which was called the pilgrims' cloister, and the choir and sacristy were enlarged. These works were carried out by the stonemason Francisco de Elejalde and the carpenters Asensio de Ojanguren and Cristóbal de Eguizabal. The sacristy and the choir were built in 1662 and 1666, respectively. Shortly after, the altarpiece was built by the architects Juan de Bolialdea, Domingo de Ascorbe and Joanes de Iturriza, who finished it.

In 1756, with the approval of the Cabildo and the Patron Saint of Abadiño, it was erected as a parish, detaching itself from the parish of Saint Torcuato, Abadiño's main parish.

Next to the temple, a hospital was built to serve the numerous travelers that circulated along this important route, which had a jail and an interior icehouse. In 1772, the rectory was built in front of it. In 1831 four lateral altars were inaugurated.

During the social crisis of the 19th century, the church was closed for worship and the images of the saints were transferred to the parish church of Abadiño, where they remained for four years. Once this crisis was overcome, the church was returned to worship and several renovations were made to the temple. The most relevant, and that lasts until today, is the construction of a bell tower in 1870. This tower, in neoclassical style, was the work of the master builder Pedro José Astarbe from Durango.

A few years later, the diocesan capital of the Basque Country was located in Vittoria. The diocesan leaders decided to build a great temple in accordance with the spiritual importance of the place. The architect José María de Basterra was in charge of the project, and in 1898 he began the studies and design of the project. It was a great temple in neo-medieval style, like the new cathedral of Vittoria, with a length of 60 m and a width of 30 m. It consisted of three very different naves. The central nave was wide and high, the lateral ones reduced to mere transit aisles. The chevet was rectangular and horizontal and the entrance portico was flanked by two large towers of 40 meters. The temple was accessed by a large staircase.

On June 13, 1899, the feast of St. Anthony the Abbot, the first stone of what was to be the new building was laid. The works were carried out in such a way that the previous building remained in use. That same year the hospital burned down.

In 1915 the first part was inaugurated and in 1928 the second part was inaugurated, but the works were stopped due to their great cost. It was then when the previous temple was demolished, but the tower that had been built in 1870 was maintained. The works did not continue, leaving only the head of the basilica and the first section of the naves, as well as a second section of the side naves and the foundations of the rest of the building. In 1918, the Board of Works announced the lack of financial resources to continue the work that summer. A nearby place was found for the extraction of the sandstone necessary for the construction, in Urkiolagirre, also known as Koroso mendi, which was located 150 meters from the summit within the municipality of Abadiño, which authorized its exploitation for an annual payment of 10 pesetas and the commitment to ask permission for it every time it was needed. The pieces of stone were taken to the vicinity of the site twice a day, where they were worked.

On August 27, 1933, Bishop Mateo Múgica consecrated the church, which, having enclosed the central nave with a wall and placed doors on the sides, was opened for worship.

On May 1, 1970, the Basque Diocesan Missions were entrusted with the care of the sanctuary. The new people in charge decided not to finish the building because of its high cost and the fact that the space available was sufficient for the celebration of the liturgy.

In any case, renovations were carried out to finish off the unfinished work in a more definitive way. The exterior of the wall enclosing the central nave was decorated and the interior was adorned with mosaics (in 1993 the mosaic of the Chapel of the Most Holy Sacrament was inaugurated and, in 1997, that of the High Altar) and stained glass windows. In 1991 the great access staircase was built and in 2006 a new guesthouse and an eco-museum were inaugurated.

== Legend ==
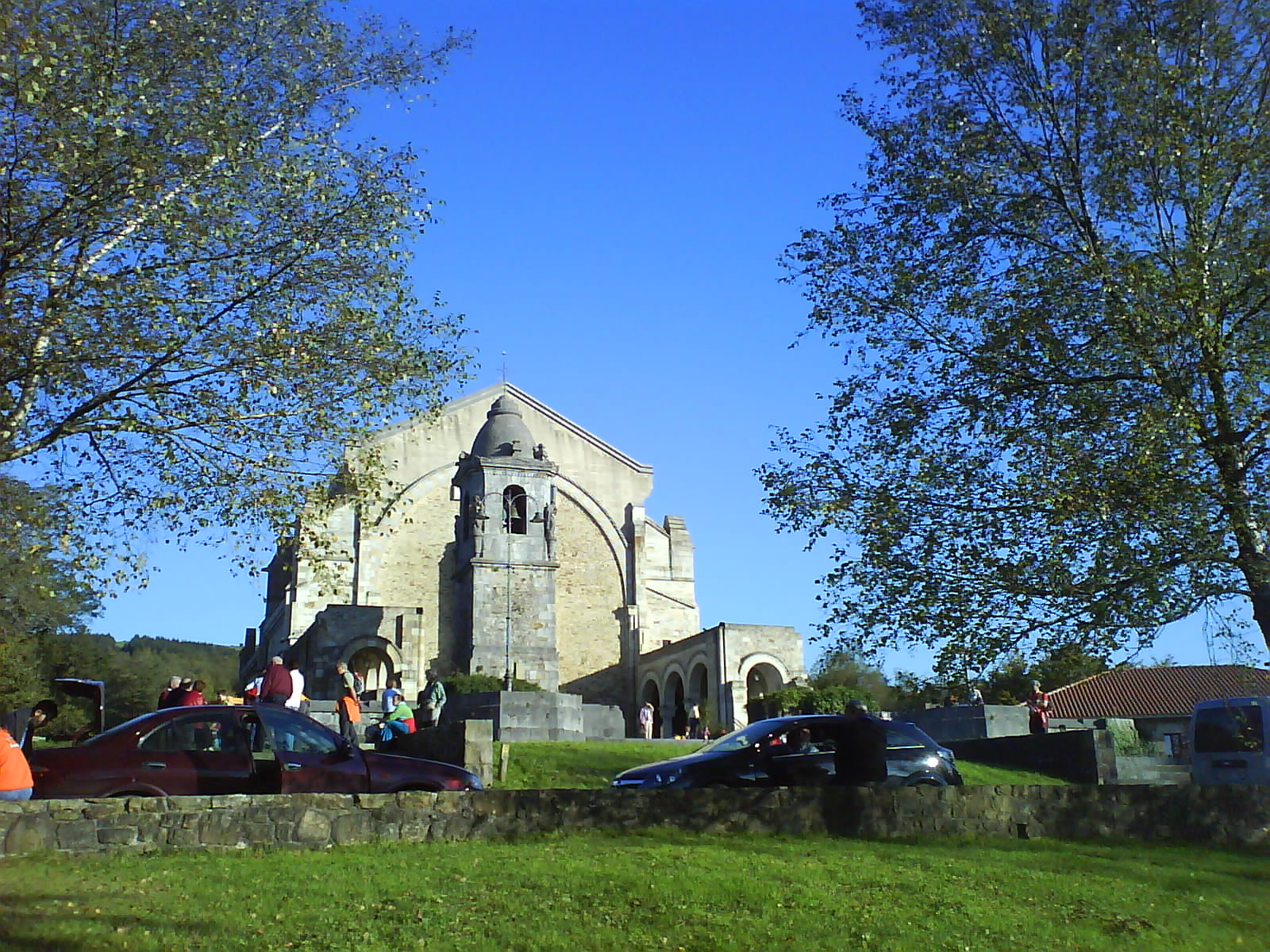
Sanctuary of the two Saints Anthony of Urkiola.

Tradition recalls that Saint Anthony of Padua arrived at Urkiola on his way to Compostela or perhaps traveling to his hometown, Lisbon, and must have spend the night in the pilgrims' hospital, praying and celebrating mass in what was then the hermitage of Saint Anton, to whom he professed such devotion that he adopted his name when he entered the Franciscan order.

== Rites at the sanctuary ==
It is customary to give different goods to the sanctuary. These gifts are made both by the towns and by the landlords and shepherds. Normally, steers are donated and sold at auction.

In the "blessing of the children" the mothers offer to Saint Anthony their children under one year of age after spending the night in the sanctuary. For this, the child is weighed on the scales called peso leal (loyal weight) and an offering equal to the weight of the child is made. The offering is usually wheat, oil or wax.

The rock at the entrance of the temple is attributed with certain virtues that allow those who go around it clockwise seven times to find a partner (if the turns are made backward, it is said that it has the opposite effect). For this same purpose, alms, papers with notes, colored pins, etc. are also left.

The rock, which is defined as "a conglomerate of stones and pebbles and cobbles and fossils of innumerable kinds that in such a particular way have been mixed and joined with non-artificial cement", was placed in the small square where it is located on November 29, 1929, by order of the then rector of the sanctuary, Benito de Vizcarra. Vizcarra found the stone in a nearby mountain and, given its strangeness, moved it to a place of easy access.

The tradition of going around this stone to find a groom is linked to an earlier tradition of sticking pins in a canvas that was in the sacristy. To find a groom, pins were stuck with white heads if the man was to be blond and with black heads if he was to be brunette. The tradition of going up to Urkiola to ask for a bride or groom has given rise to the following couplets:

Neska-zarrak joaten dira
Urkiolara,
Urkiolara,
Urkiolara,
Santuari eskatzera senar on bana
senar on bana, konbeni bada.
Santuak esaten die, buruakin ez,
buruakin ez,
buruakin ez,
Zergaitik lehenago akordatu ez
akordatu ez, orain batere ez.

— Urkiola Copla
Translation:

Spinsters go to Urkiola
to Urkiola,
to Urkiola,
to Urkiola,
To ask the saint for a good husband
A good husband, who suits them.
The saint tells them, with his head no,
With his head no,
With his head no,
Why didn't they remember before
they haven't remembered, anything now.

== Festivals and important dates ==
Two festivals are celebrated in Urkiola, one in honor of St. Anthony the Abbot and the other in honor of St. Anthony of Padua.

- Saint Anthony the Abbot: on January 17, the feast of Saint Anthony the Abbot or Saint Anton is celebrated. It is dedicated to domestic animals, which are given a "party" and different rites are performed so that they do not fall ill. This saint is the protector of animals. This feast is repeated the following Sunday. They are made to pass over the fire of a log and are blessed; even the sacristan goes out to visit the nearby villages and hamlets for this purpose and bread is blessed in the services that is then given, soaked in the water of the sanctuary itself, to the animals to eat.
- Saint Anthony of Padua: celebrated on June 13 and the following Sunday. This saint is entrusted with the search for lost objects and couples. A pilgrimage is held, which used to be attended on foot, and a livestock and agricultural fair. He is the protector of the poor and the needy.
- St. Joseph: the patron saint of the Diocesan Missions, the institution in charge of the sanctuary, is celebrated on March 19.
- Blessing of the children: it is celebrated on the second Sunday of July.
- Married or Family Day: it is celebrated on the third Sunday of July, where the request of hand is made by turning around the stone that is at the entrance of the sanctuary.
- Thanksgiving Day or Urrixena: is the thanksgiving for the fruitfulness of the field and is celebrated on the second Sunday of October.
- On January 13, 1924, the Roman Basilica of St. John Lateran, which is the cathedral of the Bishop of Rome, the Pope, was added to the sanctuary. Visitors to the Urkiola sanctuary have the same prerogatives as those who visit the Roman temple.
- On June 13, 1854, the musician and composer José María Iparraguirre performed for the first time in the Basque Country his well-known work Gernikako Arbola at the entrance of the church of Urkiola.

== Other pieces of the set ==
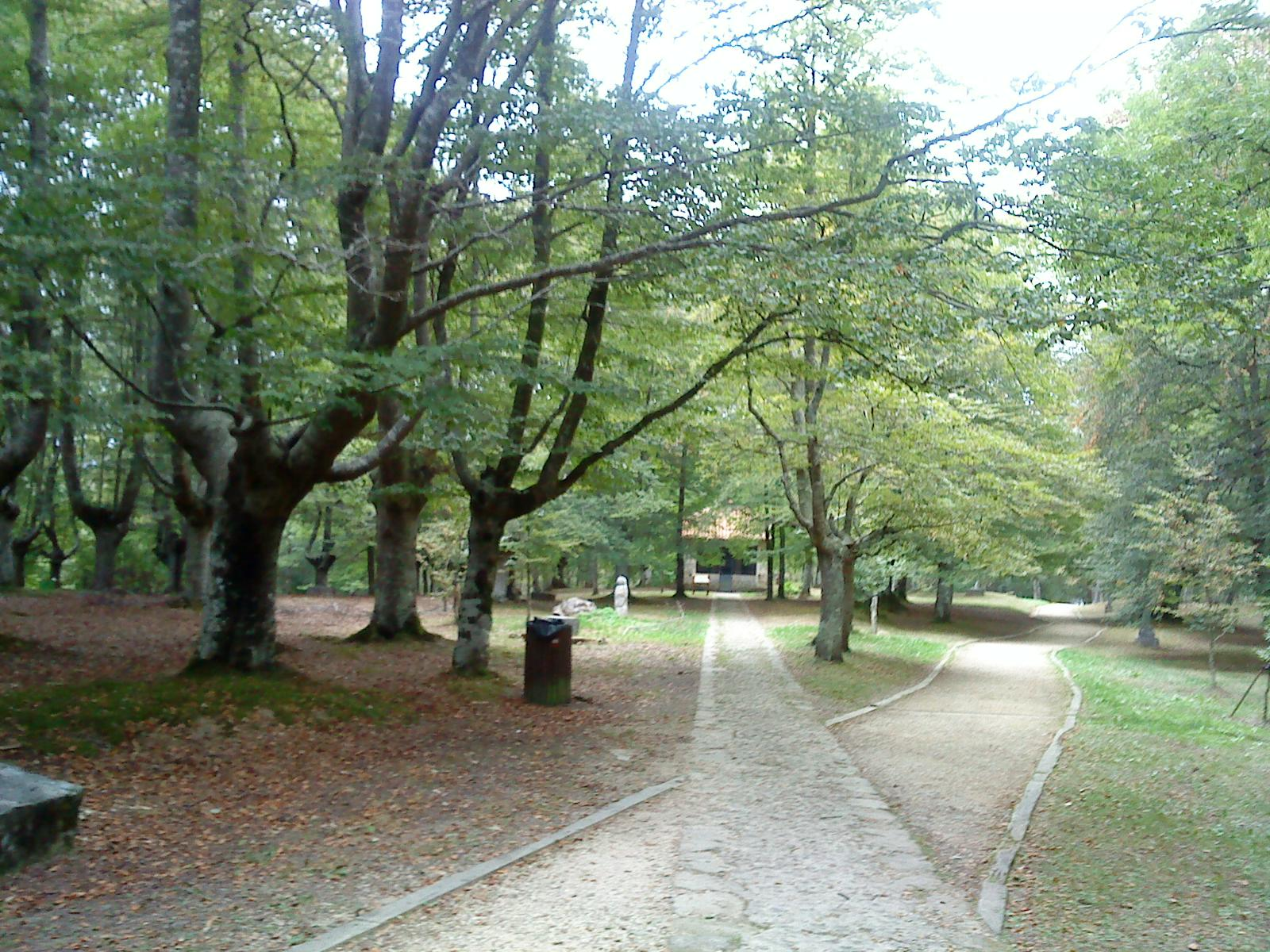
Stations of the Cross walkway with the Santo Cristo Chapel in the background.

Together with the sanctuary itself, two hermitages and a Stations of the Cross make up the Urkiola Sanctuary complex. The hermitages, equidistant from the sanctuary and united by a roadway that coincides with the old Camino Real (Royal Road), are:

- Our Lady of the Remedies and Saint Apollonia, popularly called Santutxu, is a hermitage located on the Camino Real. It is located over a spring that opens into a large fountain with a washing place. The waters of this fountain are said to have curative properties, and as Apollonia is the patron saint of dentists, it is believed that the waters are good for teeth and toothaches. In the lower part there are remains of another hermitage from at least the 16th century. For the water cure to have an effect, it is said that the following ritual must be done:

It is a tradition that those who suffer from toothache should take water from this fountain in their mouths, go around the hermitage three or seven times and then throw the liquid inside invoking the saint. For it to take effect, a creed should be recited before this rite and another at the end.

- Santo Cristo or de La Vera Cruz, like the previous one, is a shrine on the edge of the old Camino Real. Tradition has it that pilgrims used to take off their shoes here before arriving at the sanctuary. It was built in 1663.
- Stations of the Cross and Calvary, built in 1943 by posthumous order of a faithful, it is a double Stations of the Cross, the way out is different from the way back, which leads to a Calvary nestled in a natural balcony that opens on the gorge of Atxarte and Durangaldea.

== Bibliography ==
- Urkiola (in Spanish). Bilbao: Servicio Central de Publicaciones del Gobierno Vasco. ISBN 84-457-0644-6.
- Senderos de Urkiola (in Spanish). Bilbao: Sua Edizioak. ISBN 84-8216-071-0.
- Berriro Loza, José Ángel. Patrimonio de Bizkaia, Santuario de Urkiola, Abadiño (in Spanish). Bilbao: Diputación Foral de Vizcaya.
- Martija, Eusebio. Visita al Santuario de Urkiola (in Spanish). Bilbao: bbk.
