= José María Iparraguirre =

Basque writer

- José María de Iparraguirre Balerdi
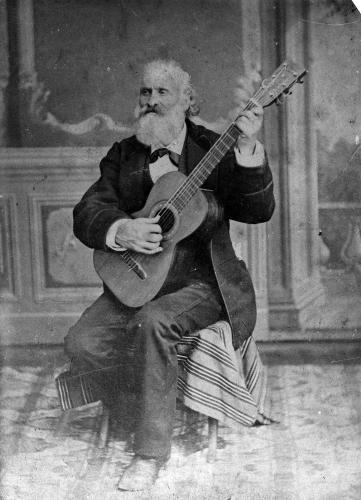
- Born: 1820; Urretxu, Gipuzkoa, Spain
- Died: 1881 (aged 60–61); Itsaso
- Occupations: Writer, poet, bertsolari, musician
- Writing career
- Language: Spanish, Basque

José María Iparraguirre (1820–1881) was a Spanish poet and writer in the Basque language, bertsolari and musician.

José Maria Iparraguirre, a bard, is known for his compositions, the most significant of which is Gernikako Arbola (literally "the Guernica tree"); it quickly became the Basque anthem.

== Biography ==
José María Iparraguirre was born in Urretxu an Gipuzkoa in 1820, and died in 1881 in Itxaso at the age of 61. He was a very famous poet and musician. He had a bohemian and adventurous life that earned him the nickname "bard", an image he transmitted with his inseparable guitar and improvisation of songs and verses, but he was also a great bertsolari. His work, written mostly in Basque (although he also wrote in Spanish, French, English and Italian), takes up some of the most significant and popular songs of the time, however that of the Gernikako arbola is nevertheless the best known.

He lived in full romanticism of which he is clearly one of the children and an example. His works are linked to the ancestral traditions of the Basque people, with their legends and religion.

The turbulent historical period that he lived, the Carlist wars and the abolition of fueros (Fueros) and his deep romanticism, also expressed in his political struggle as well as his participation in the struggles (where he was wounded in the leg), led him into exile. throughout Europe (France, Germany, Italy, England and Switzerland) and Latin America not to submit to the Embrace of Vergara or the Convention of 'Ognate given its deep Carlism.

In 1859 he married the Gipuzkoan María Ángela Querejeta with whom he lived in Uruguay and will have eight children, two boys and six daughters (he had already had another son before). In 1877 he returned to the Basque Country, leaving his family in America. The most popular of his compositions is undoubtedly Gernikako arbola.

== Bibliography ==
- Chacón Delgado, Pedro José. Nobleza con Libertad. Biografía de la derecha vasca. Editorial Atxular Atea. FPEV 2015. (pp 279–289) bajo licencia CC BY-SA 3.0).

== Plays ==
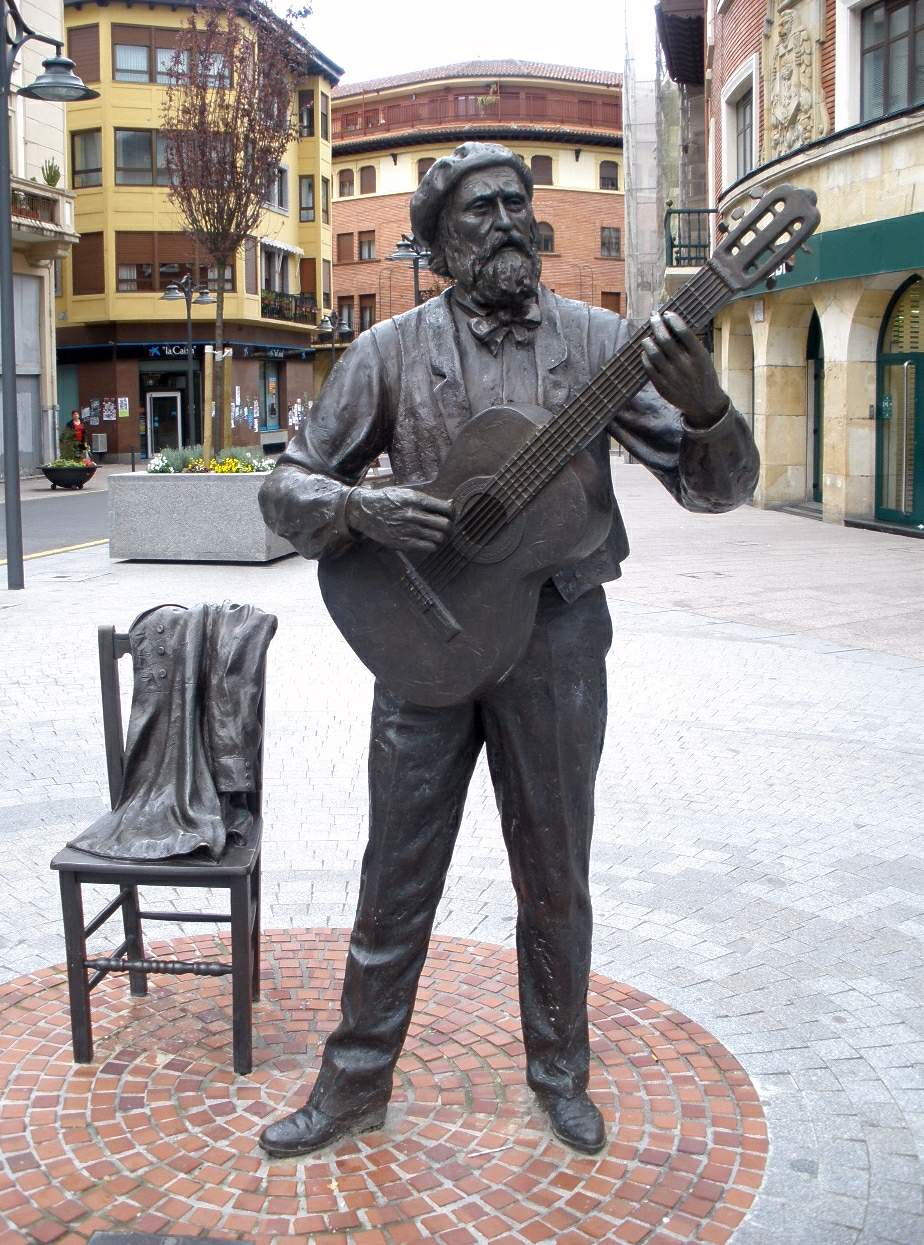

- Agur Euskalerria
- Ameriketatik Urretxuko semeei
- Errukarria
- Ezkongaietan
- Gernikako Arbola
- Glu, glu, glu!
- Gora Euskera
- Kantari euskalduna
- Nere amak baleki
- Nere etorrera
- Nere izarra
- Nere maitearentzat
- Nere ongile maiteari
- Ume eder bat
- Zugana manuela
