= Emeterio Arrese =

Spanish writer

- Emeterio Arrese Bauduer
- Born: 3 March 1869; Tolosa, Guipúzcoa, Spain
- Died: 7 April 1954 (aged 85); Tolosa, Guipúzcoa, Spain
- Occupation: Poet
- Writing career
- Language: Spanish, Basque

Emeterio Arrese, born Emeterio Arrese Bauduer (3 March 1869 – 7 April 1954), was a post-romantic Basque-language poet.

== Poetry ==
Arrese practiced extemporaneous bertsolariza singing. His work explored post-romantic topics such as nature, patriotism, balance, and the passage of time.

Xabier de Lizardi was a close friend of Arrese and was influenced by his style. In his last years, Arrese professed a deep affection for Lizardi's work. Another of Arrese's friends was the Toulouse musician Eduardo Mocoroa. Arrese wrote the libretto for Mocoroa's opera Anya, which premiered in Pamplona in 1900, and Mocoroa included several of Arrese's poems in his other operas.

In his later poems, Arrese promoted the Basque pelota and the building of the fronton courts on which it is played.

== Bibliography ==
- Nere bidean, 1913, E. López.
- Txindor, 1928, Leizaola.
- Olerki Berrizte,1952, Itxaropena.
- Aiton baten eriotza (bakarrizketa bertsotan), 1898, Euskalzale.
- Sentierak, 1900
- Zara, 1913, E. Lopez.
