= Berango (Bilbao Metro) =

Rapid transit station in Berango, Basque Country, Spain

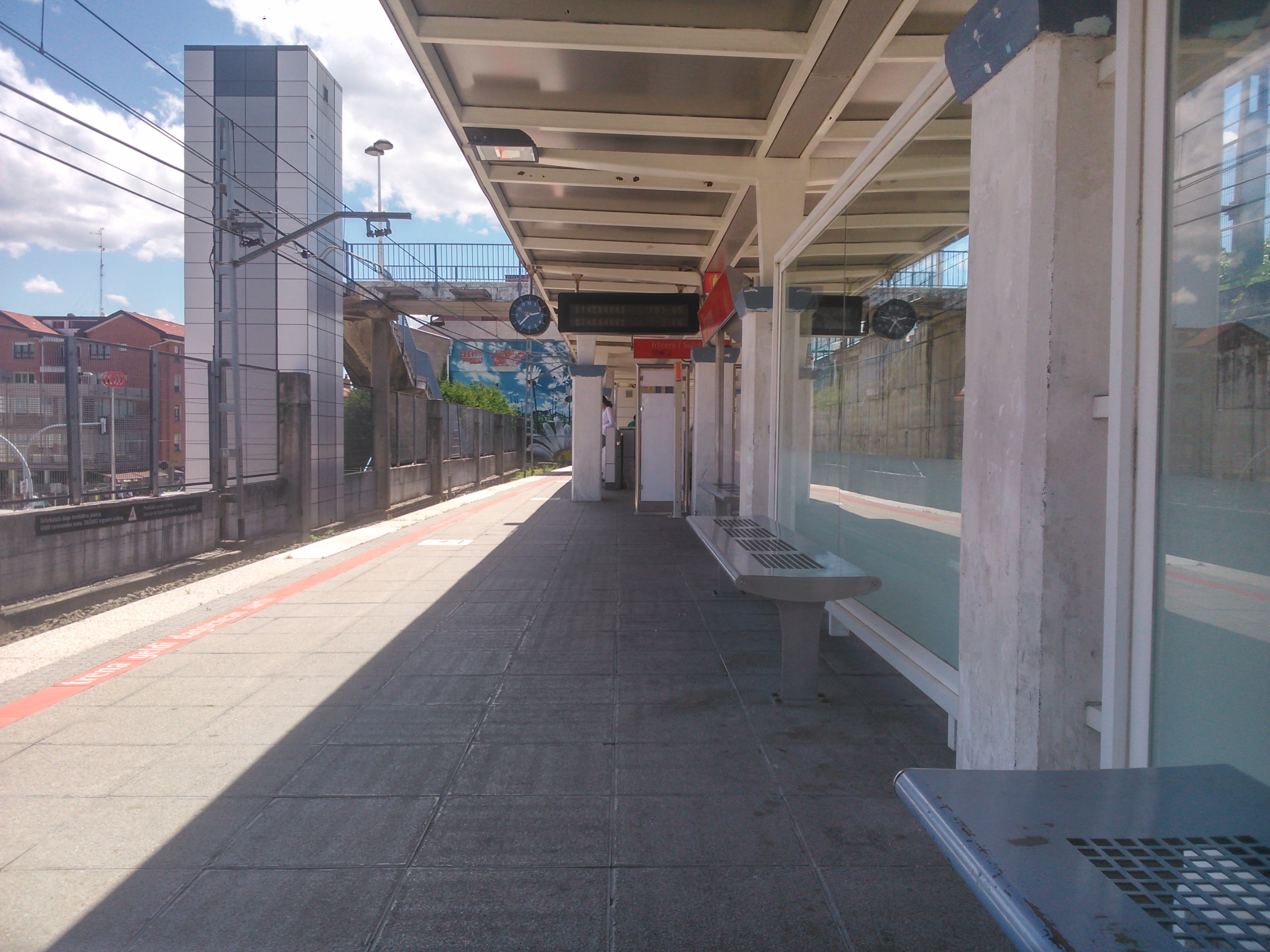
- Platform

General information
- Location: 31 Sabino Arana St. 48640 Berango; Spain
- Coordinates: 43°22′01″N 2°59′58″W
- Owner: Biscay Transport Consortium; Euskal Trenbide Sarea
- Line: Line 1
- Platforms: 1 island platform
- Tracks: 2

Construction
- Structure type: At-grade
- Platform levels: 1
- Parking: Yes
- Accessible: Yes

Other information
- Fare zone: Zone 2

History
- Opened: 15 September 1893
- Rebuilt: 11 November 1995

Passengers
- 2021: 356,675

Services
Preceding station	Metro Bilbao	Following station
Larrabasterra towards Plentzia	Line 1	Ibarbengoa towards Etxebarri
Location

Berango is a station on Line 1 of the Bilbao Metro. It is located in the municipality of Berango. The station opened as part of the metro on 11 November 1995.

== History ==
The station first opened to the public in 1893 as part of the Las Arenas-Plentzia railway, operated by the Las Arenas-Plencia Railway Company. At Las Arenas, in the municipality of Getxo, the line connected with the Bilbao-Las Arenas railway. Direct services between Bilbao and Berango started in 1901.

Starting in 1947, the narrow-gauge railway companies that operated within the Bilbao metropolitan area were merged to become Ferrocarriles y Transportes Suburbanos, shortened FTS and the first precedent of today's Bilbao Metro. In 1977, the FTS network was transferred to the public company FEVE and in 1982 to the recently created Basque Railways. In the 1980s it was decided the station, just like most of the former railway line, would be integrated into Line 1 of the metro, with the new station opening now as part of the metro network on 11 November 1995.

== Station layout ==
It is an overground station with one island platform located on an uneven slope. There were plans to replace the station with a new underground infrastructure, but the project was abandoned in favor of improving the existing facilities.

=== Access ===
- 31 Sabino Arana St.
- 10 Gorrondatxe Rd.

== Services ==
The station is served by Line 1 from Etxebarri to Plentzia. The station is also served by regional Bizkaibus bus services.
