= Sopela (Bilbao Metro) =

Rapid transit station in Sopela, Basque Country, Spain

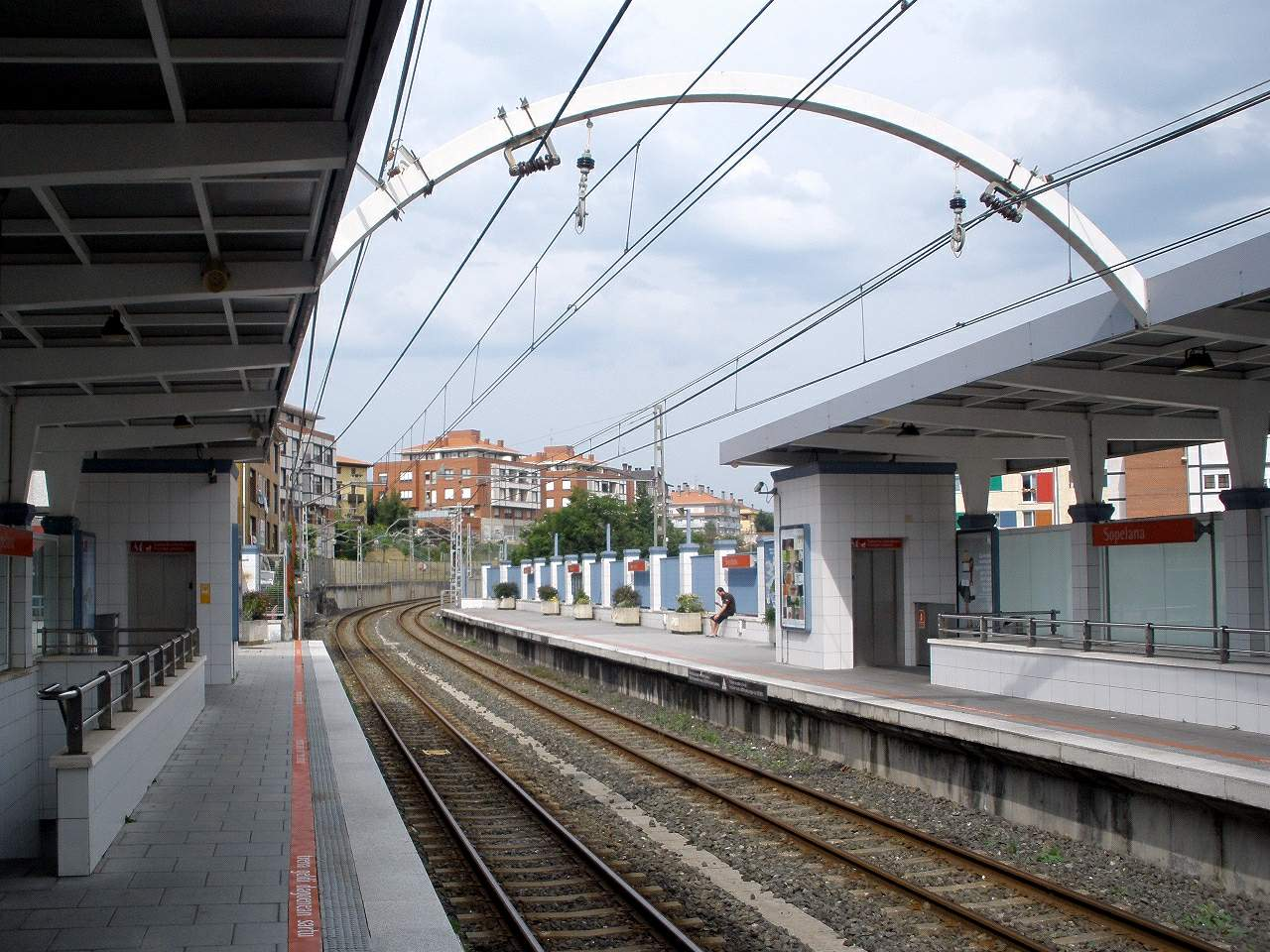
- View of the station

General information
- Location: 3 Zubigane St. 48600 Sopela; Spain
- Coordinates: 43°22′49″N 2°58′44″W
- Owner: Biscay Transport Consortium; Euskal Trenbide Sarea
- Line: Line 1
- Platforms: 2 side platforms
- Tracks: 2

Construction
- Structure type: At-grade
- Platform levels: 1
- Parking: No
- Accessible: Yes

Other information
- Fare zone: Zone 3

History
- Opened: 15 September 1893
- Rebuilt: 11 November 1995

Passengers
- 2021: 445,114

Services
Preceding station	Metro Bilbao	Following station
Urduliz towards Plentzia	Line 1	Larrabasterra towards Etxebarri
Location

Sopela is a station on Line 1 of the Bilbao Metro. It is located in the municipality of Sopela. The station opened as part of the metro on 11 November 1995. The station was originally named Sopelana after the municipality, which changed its name to Sopela in 2014, the station's name also being changed shortly thereafter.

== History ==
The station first opened to the public in 1893 as part of the Las Arenas-Plentzia railway, operated by the Las Arenas-Plencia Railway Company. At Las Arenas, in the municipality of Getxo, the line connected with the Bilbao-Las Arenas railway. Direct services between Bilbao and Sopela started in 1901.

Starting in 1947, the narrow-gauge railway companies that operated within the Bilbao metropolitan area were merged to become Ferrocarriles y Transportes Suburbanos, shortened FTS and the first precedent of today's Bilbao Metro. In 1977, the FTS network was transferred to the public company FEVE and in 1982 to the recently created Basque Railways. In the 1980s it was decided the station, just like most of the former railway line, would be integrated into Line 1 of the metro, with the new station opening now as part of the metro network on 11 November 1995.

== Station layout ==
It is an overground station with two side platforms, an underground tunnel joins both.

=== Access ===
- 3 Zubigane St.
- 15 Lizarre St.
- Station's interior

== Services ==
The station is served by Line 1 from Etxebarri to Plentzia.
