= Algorta (Bilbao Metro) =

Rapid transit station in Getxo, Basque Country, Spain

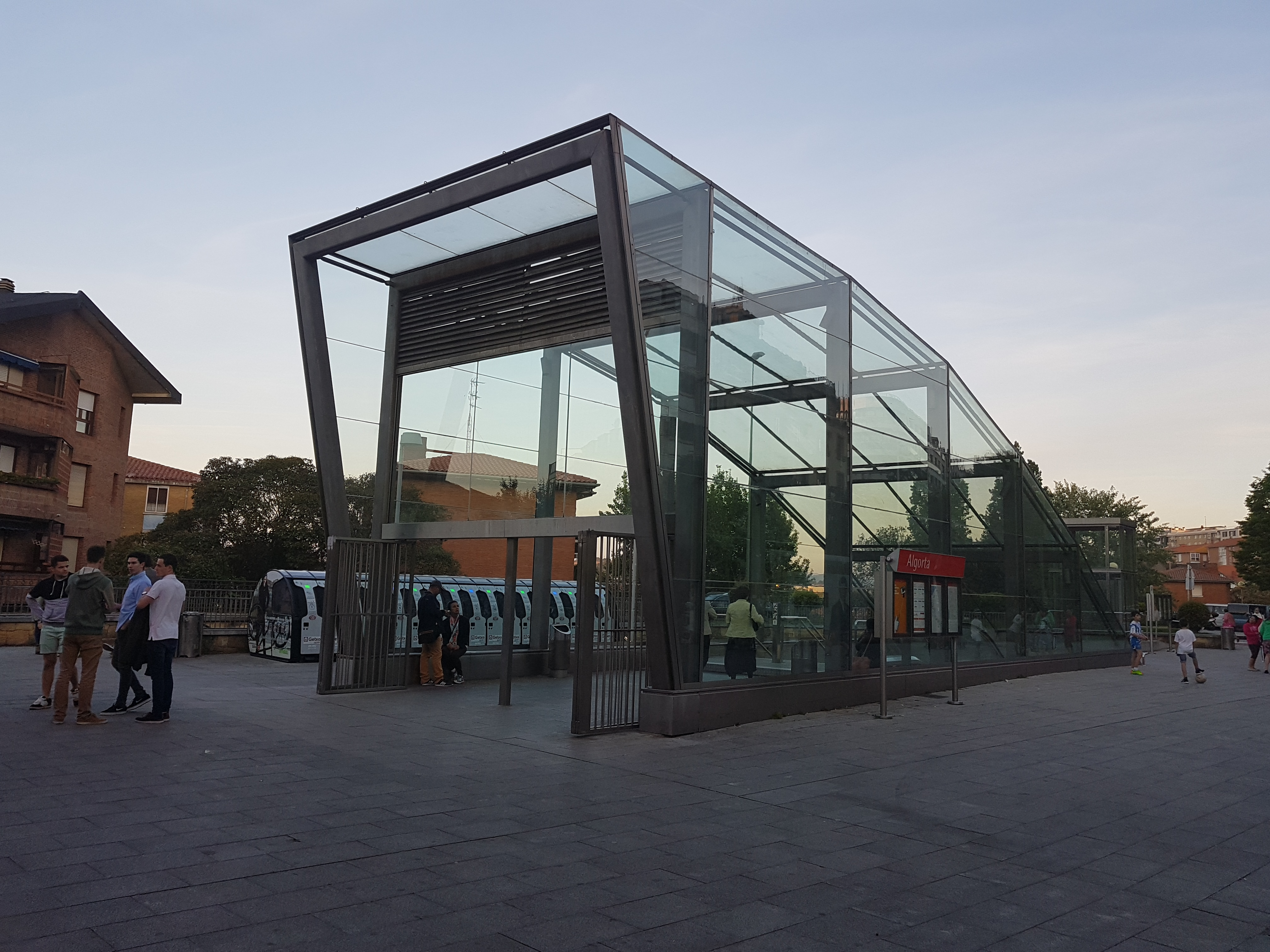
- Entrance to the station

General information
- Location: 19 Txakursolo St. 48992 Getxo; Spain
- Coordinates: 43°21′03″N 3°00′34″W
- Owner: Biscay Transport Consortium; Euskal Trenbide Sarea
- Line: Line 1
- Platforms: 1 island platform
- Tracks: 2

Construction
- Structure type: Below-grade
- Parking: No
- Accessible: Yes

Other information
- Fare zone: Zone 2

History
- Opened: 15 September 1893
- Rebuilt: 11 November 1995

Passengers
- 2021: 1,780,371

Services
Preceding station	Metro Bilbao	Following station
Bidezabal towards Plentzia	Line 1	Aiboa towards Etxebarri
Location

Algorta is a station on Line 1 of the Bilbao Metro. It is located in the neighborhood of Algorta, in the municipality of Getxo. The station opened as part of the metro on 11 November 1995, replacing an older station.

== History ==
The station first opened to the public in 1893 as part of the Las Arenas-Plentzia railway, operated by the Las Arenas-Plencia Railway Company. At the time it was known as Guecho station. At Las Arenas, in the municipality of Getxo, the line connected with the Bilbao-Las Arenas railway. Direct services between Bilbao and Algorta started in 1901. The station was at-grade, with one side platform and one island platform. The station building, now demolished, followed the same architectural design as others of the same line, with the only remaining example being that of Neguri station. Next to the station, there was a small train depot.

Starting in 1947, the narrow-gauge railway companies that operated within the Bilbao metropolitan area were merged to become Ferrocarriles y Transportes Suburbanos, shortened FTS and the first precedent of today's Bilbao Metro. In 1977, the FTS network was transferred to the public company FEVE and in 1982 to the recently created Basque Railways. In the 1980s it was decided the station, just like most of the former railway line, would be integrated into Line 1 of the metro, with the new station opening underground now as part of the metro network on 11 November 1995. The former station building, platforms and train depot were demolished and replaced with a public plaza named Algorta Station Plaza.

== Station layout ==
It is a half-underground station with a single island platform. The main hall is above the ground.

=== Access ===
- 1 Telletxe St. (Telletxe exit)
- Bolue St. (Bolue exit, closed during night services)
- 1 Telletxe St. (Telletxe exit)

== Services ==
The station is served by Line 1 from Etxebarri to Plentzia.
