= Bidezabal (Bilbao Metro) =

Rapid transit station in Getxo, Basque Country, Spain

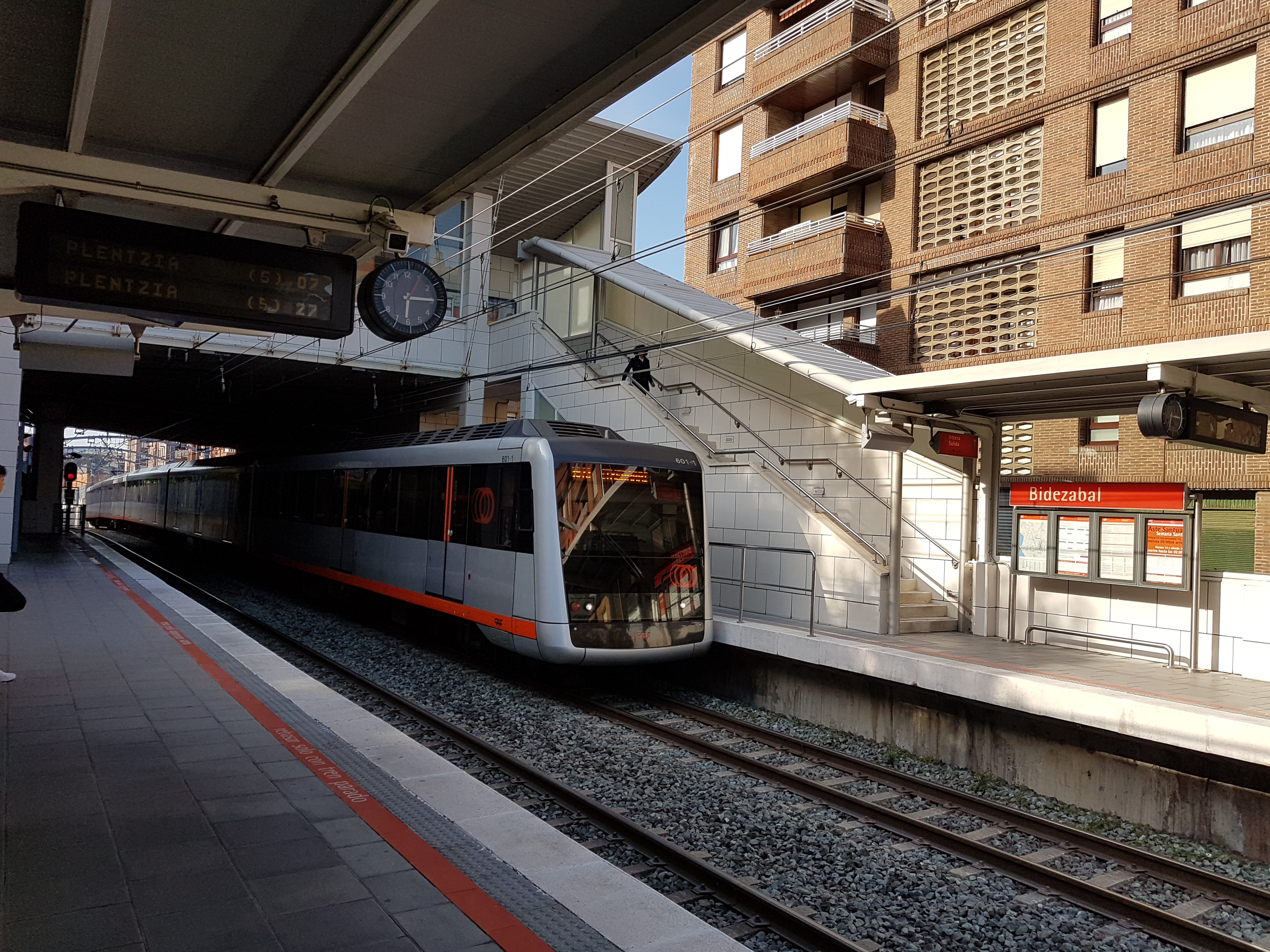
- View of the station

General information
- Location: 13 Bidezabal St. 48993 Getxo; Spain
- Coordinates: 43°21′25″N 3°00′42″W
- Owner: Biscay Transport Consortium; Euskal Trenbide Sarea
- Line: Line 1
- Platforms: 2 side platforms
- Tracks: 2

Construction
- Structure type: At-grade
- Platform levels: 1
- Parking: No
- Accessible: Yes

Other information
- Fare zone: Zone 2

History
- Opened: 15 September 1893
- Rebuilt: 11 November 1995

Passengers
- 2021: 970,849

Services
Preceding station	Metro Bilbao	Following station
Ibarbengoa towards Plentzia	Line 1	Algorta towards Etxebarri
Location

Bidezabal is a station on Line 1 of the Bilbao Metro. It is located in the neighborhood of Algorta, in the municipality of Getxo. The station opened as part of the metro on 11 November 1995.

== History ==
The station first opened to the public in 1893 as part of the Las Arenas-Plentzia railway, operated by the Las Arenas-Plencia Railway Company. At the time it was known as Guecho station. At Las Arenas, in the municipality of Getxo, the line connected with the Bilbao-Las Arenas railway. Direct services between Bilbao and Bidezabal started in 1901.

Starting in 1947, the narrow-gauge railway companies that operated within the Bilbao metropolitan area were merged to become Ferrocarriles y Transportes Suburbanos, shortened FTS and the first precedent of today's Bilbao Metro. In 1977, the FTS network was transferred to the public company FEVE and in 1982 to the recently created Basque Railways. In the 1980s it was decided the station, just like most of the former railway line, would be integrated into Line 1 of the metro, with the new station opening now as part of the metro network on 11 November 1995.

== Station layout ==
It is an overground station with two side platforms. The main hall is located directly above the tracks.

=== Access ===
- 13 Bidezabal St.
- Sarri St. (only for the Plentzia-bound platform)
- 11 Aita Domingo Iturrate St. (only for the Etxebarri-bound platform)
- Station's interior

== Services ==
The station is served by Line 1 from Etxebarri to Plentzia.
