= Urduliz (Bilbao Metro) =

Rapid transit station in Urduliz, Basque Country, Spain

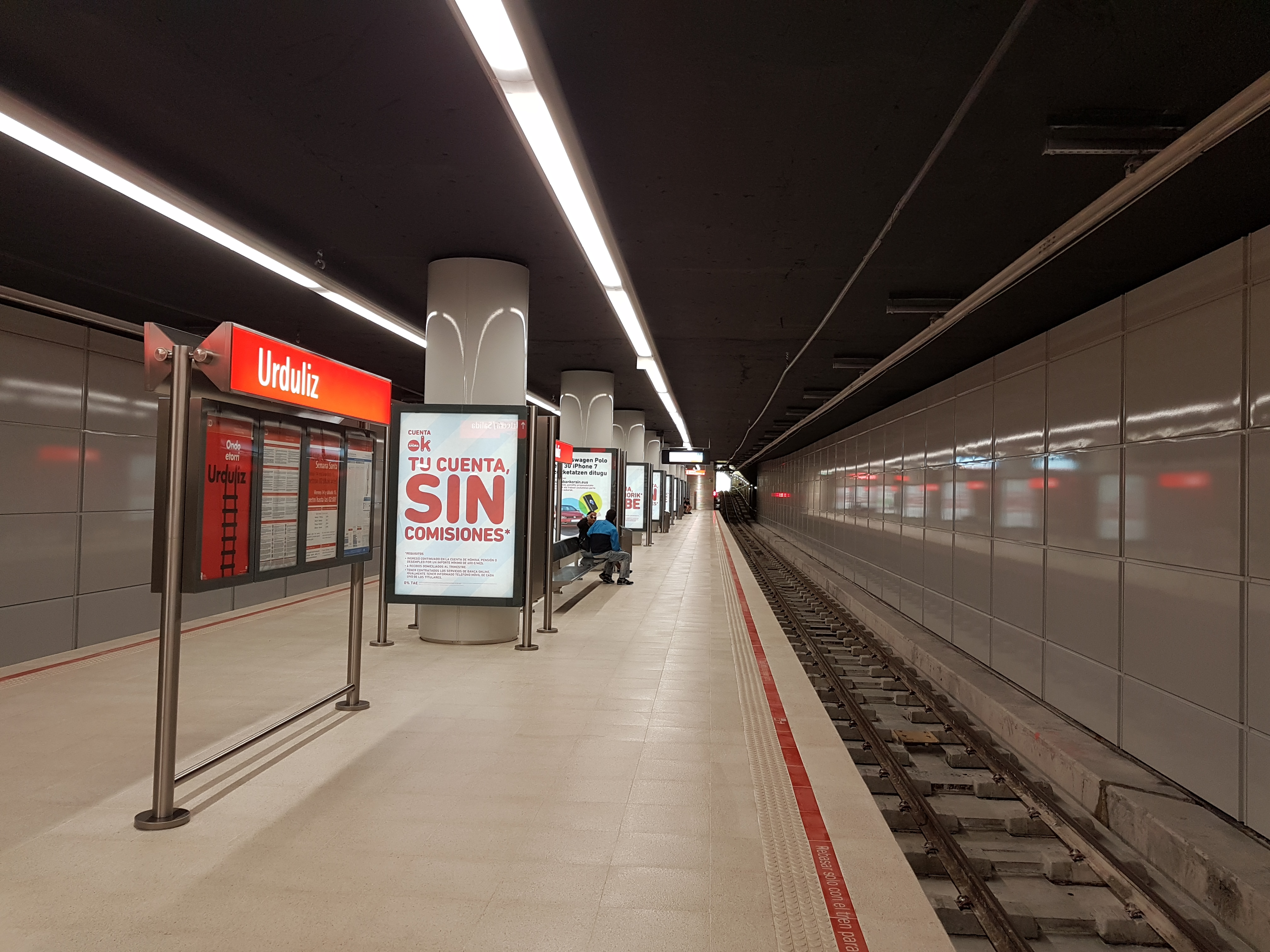
- View of the new station

General information
- Location: 35 Aita Gotzon St. 48610 Urduliz; Spain
- Coordinates: 43°22′44″N 2°57′30″W
- Owner: Biscay Transport Consortium; Euskal Trenbide Sarea
- Line: Line 1
- Platforms: 1 island platform
- Tracks: 2

Construction
- Structure type: Underground
- Platform levels: 1
- Parking: No
- Accessible: Yes

Other information
- Fare zone: Zone 3

History
- Opened: 15 September 1893
- Rebuilt: 10 April 2017

Passengers
- 2021: 431,839

Services
Preceding station	Metro Bilbao	Following station
Plentzia Terminus	Line 1	Sopela towards Etxebarri
Location

Urduliz is a station on Line 1 of the Bilbao Metro. It is located in the municipality of Urduliz. Originally an overground station belonging to the Bilbao-Plentzia railway, the station was rebuilt and put underground in 2017.

== History ==
The station first opened to the public in 1893 as part of the Las Arenas-Plentzia railway, operated by the Las Arenas-Plencia Railway Company. At Las Arenas, in the municipality of Getxo, the line connected with the Bilbao-Las Arenas railway. Direct services between Bilbao and Urduliz started in 1901.

Starting in 1947, the narrow-gauge railway companies that operated within the Bilbao metropolitan area were merged to become Ferrocarriles y Transportes Suburbanos, shortened FTS and the first precedent of today's Bilbao Metro. In 1977, the FTS network was transferred to the public company FEVE and in 1982 to the recently created Basque Railways. In the 1980s it was decided the station, just like most of the former railway line, would be integrated into Line 1 of the metro, with the new station opening now as part of the metro network on 11 November 1995.

The station was closed down in 2015 with the aim of removing the line's last level crossing, which required the demolition of the station building and the construction of a new underground station. The new station opened on 10 April 2017.

== Station layout ==
It is an underground station with a single access to an island platform.

=== Access ===
- 35 Aita Gotzon St.

== Services ==
The station is served by Line 1 from Etxebarri to Plentzia. The station is also served by regional Bizkaibus bus services.
