= Gobela (Bilbao Metro) =

Rapid transit station in Getxo, Basque Country, Spain

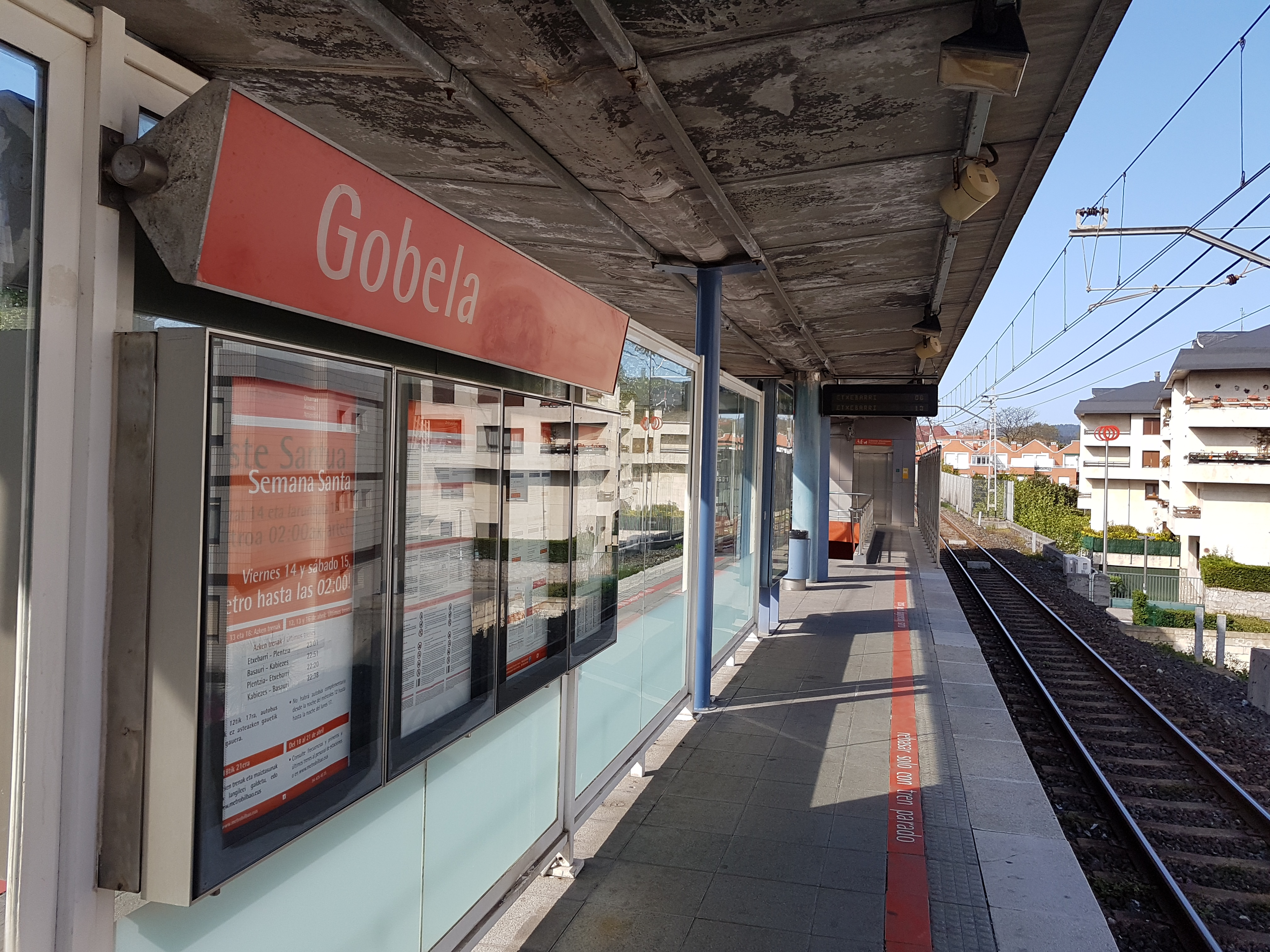
- View of the station

General information
- Location: 53-55 Negubide St. 48930 Getxo; Spain
- Coordinates: 43°19′59″N 3°00′26″W
- Owner: Biscay Transport Consortium; Euskal Trenbide Sarea
- Line: Line 1
- Platforms: 1 island platform
- Tracks: 2

Construction
- Structure type: At-grade
- Platform levels: 1
- Parking: No
- Accessible: Yes

Other information
- Fare zone: Zone 2

History
- Opened: 15 September 1893
- Rebuilt: 24 June 1996

Passengers
- 2021: 574,708

Services
Preceding station	Metro Bilbao	Following station
Neguri towards Plentzia	Line 1	Areeta towards Etxebarri
Location

Gobela is a station on Line 1 of the Bilbao Metro. It is located in the neighborhood of Itzubaltzeta-Romo, in the municipality of Getxo. The station opened as part of the metro on 24 June 1996, replacing an older station. It is located immediately to the west of Campo Municipal de Gobela, home of the football team Arenas Club de Getxo.

== History ==
The station first opened to the public in 1893 as part of the Las Arenas-Plentzia railway, operated by the Las Arenas-Plencia Railway Company. At the time it was known as Gobelas station. At Las Arenas, in the municipality of Getxo, the line connected with the Bilbao-Las Arenas railway. Direct services between Bilbao and Gobela started in 1901.

Starting in 1947, the narrow-gauge railway companies that operated within the Bilbao metropolitan area were merged to become Ferrocarriles y Transportes Suburbanos, shortened FTS and the first precedent of today's Bilbao Metro. In 1977, the FTS network was transferred to the public company FEVE and in 1982 to the recently created Basque Railways. In the 1980s it was decided the station, just like most of the former railway line, would be integrated into Line 1 of the metro, with the new station opening now as part of the metro network on 24 June 1996, although the metro had been in operation since November 1995.

== Station layout ==
It is an at-grade, open-air station with one island platform. The hall is located at street level with a single entrance from Negubide street.

=== Access ===
- 53-55 Negubide St. / 15 Errekagane St.
- Station's interior

== Services ==
The station is served by Line 1 from Etxebarri to Plentzia.
