= Line 1 (Bilbao Metro) =

Rapid transit line in Biscay, Basque Country, Spain

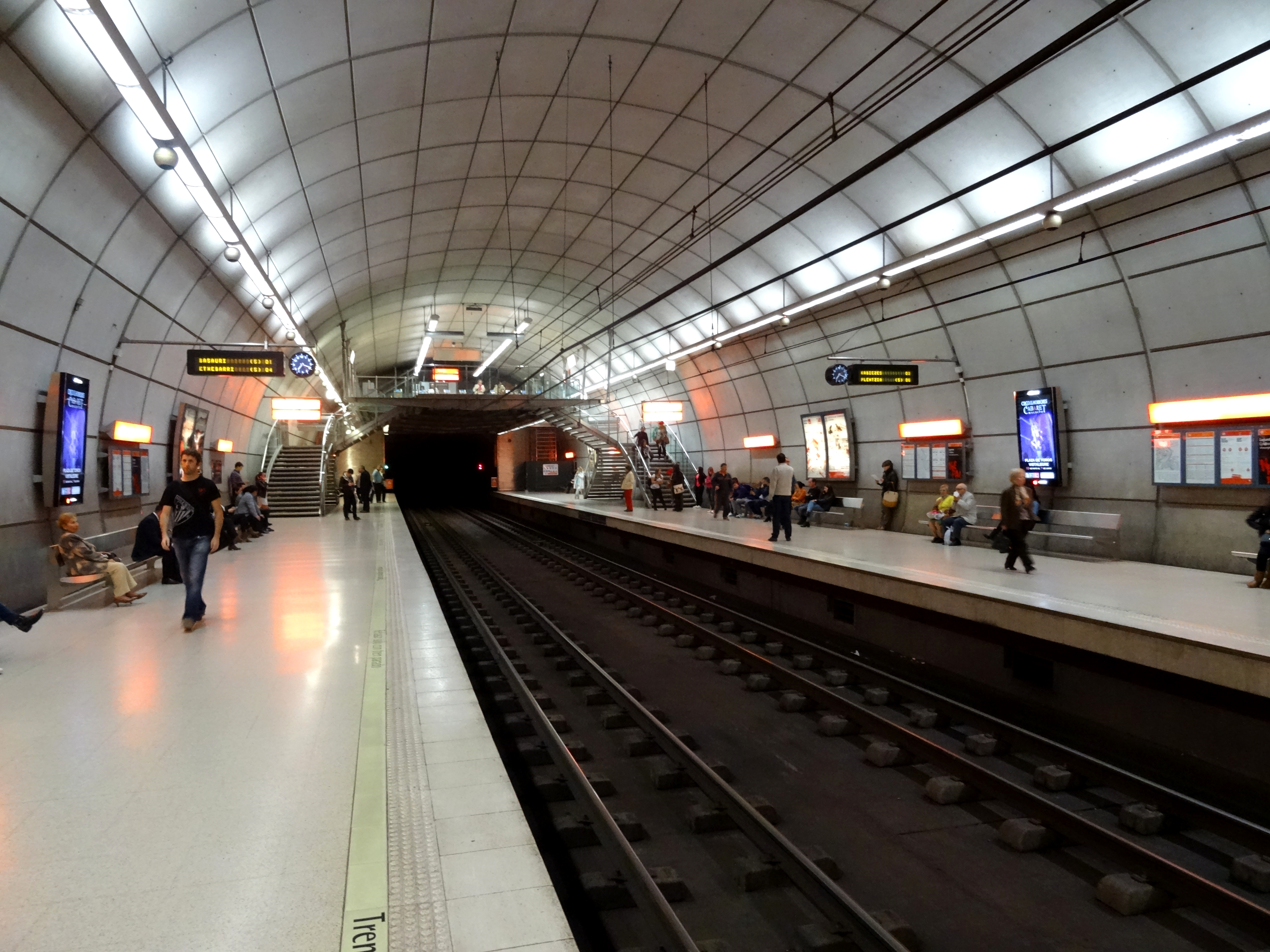
- Eliptikoa station in 2015

Overview
- Owner: Biscay Transport Consortium
- Locale: Etxebarri, Bilbao, Erandio, Leioa, Getxo, Berango, Sopelana, Urduliz, Plentzia (Basque Country, Spain)
- Termini: Plentzia; Etxebarri
- Stations: 29

Service
- Type: Rapid transit
- System: Bilbao Metro
- Operator: Metro Bilbao
- Rolling stock: Metro Bilbao 500, 550, 600 series

History
- Opened: 11 November 1995; 30 years ago
- Last extension: 2005

Technical
- Line length: 28.83 km (17.91 mi)
- Track gauge: 1,000 mm (3 ft 3 3/8 in) metre gauge
- Electrification: 1,500 V DC overhead catenary

Line 1 of the Bilbao Metro is a rapid transit line in Biscay, Basque Country, Spain. It runs from Etxebarri to Plentzia. Its route covers the municipality of Etxebarri, the city of Bilbao, the right bank of the Nervión river and Uribe Kosta. The line has 29 stations.

== History ==
On November 11, 1995, Lehendakari José Antonio Ardanza opened the first 23 stations of the Metro system between Casco Viejo and Plentzia. The next year, on June 24, 1996, Gobela opened as an infill station between Areeta and Neguri, in the municipality of Getxo. On July 5, 1997, three new stations were opened: Santutxu, Basarrate and Bolueta; all in Bilbao.

Line 2 of the Metro opened in 2002, sharing tracks with the first line between Bolueta and San Inazio. Both lines were extended by one station on 8 January 2005, with the opening of Etxebarri.

The Maidagan level crossing in Getxo, one of the two that remained in the Metro, was removed in 2012 by building a tunnel for the Metro in the area. The other remaining level crossing was located next to Urduliz station. It closed in 2015, and was rebuilt underground. The new Urduliz station opened in 2017.

On 15 June 2020, Ibarbengoa station (between Bidezabal and Berango) opened to the public. The station was actually built in 2012 (at the same time as the Maidagan level crossing was put underground), but the opening was delayed until its park and ride facilities were built.

== Station list ==
Station	Transfers (Note: All stations on the San Ignazio-Etxebarri section are also served by line 2.)	Location		Opening date (Note: Many stations on the Lutxana-Plentzia section were opened during the nineteenth century. The given dates refer to the inauguration of the metro service.)
Plentzia		Plentzia		11 November 1995
Urduliz		Urduliz		11 November 1995
Sopela		Sopela		11 November 1995
Larrabasterra		Sopela		11 November 1995
Berango		Berango		11 November 1995
Ibarbengoa		Getxo		15 June 2020
Bidezabal		Getxo		11 November 1995
Algorta		Getxo		11 November 1995
Aiboa		Getxo		11 November 1995
Neguri		Getxo		11 November 1995
Gobela		Getxo		24 June 1996
Areeta		Getxo		11 November 1995
Lamiako		Leioa		11 November 1995
Leioa		Leioa		11 November 1995
Astrabudua		Erandio		11 November 1995
Erandio		Erandio		11 November 1995
Lutxana	Line E3a	Erandio		11 November 1995
San Ignazio	Line 2	Deusto	Bilbao	11 November 1995
Sarriko		Deusto	Bilbao	11 November 1995
Deustu		Deusto	Bilbao	11 November 1995
San Mamés	Bilbao tram; Cercanías; Bilbao Intermodal	Basurto-Zorroza	Bilbao	11 November 1995
Indautxu		Abando	Bilbao	11 November 1995
Eliptikoa		Abando	Bilbao	11 November 1995
Abando	Bilbao tram; (Bilbao-Abando and Bilbao-Concordia); (Bilbao-Abando and Bilbao-Concordia)	Abando	Bilbao	11 November 1995
Zazpikaleak/Casco Viejo	Line 3; Bilbao tram; Line E1; Line E3; Line E4	Ibaiondo	Bilbao	11 November 1995
Santutxu		Begoña	Bilbao	5 July 1997
Basarrate		Begoña	Bilbao	5 July 1997
Bolueta	Bilbao tram	Begoña	Bilbao	5 July 1997
Etxebarri	Line 2	Etxebarri		8 January 2005
