= Areeta (Bilbao Metro) =

Rapid transit station in Getxo, Basque Country, Spain

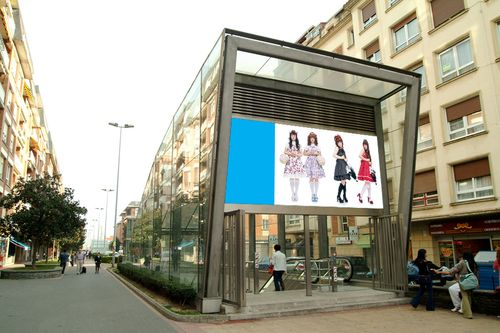
- Station entrance

General information
- Location: 11-13 Ibaigane St. 48930 Getxo; Spain
- Coordinates: 43°19′34″N 3°00′35″W
- Owner: Biscay Transport Consortium; Euskal Trenbide Sarea
- Line: Line 1
- Platforms: 1 island platform
- Tracks: 2
- Connections: Bus

Construction
- Structure type: Underground
- Platform levels: 1
- Parking: No
- Accessible: Yes

Other information
- Fare zone: Zone 2

History
- Opened: 1 July 1887
- Rebuilt: 11 November 1995

Passengers
- 2021: 2,481,381

Services
Preceding station	Metro Bilbao	Following station
Gobela towards Plentzia	Line 1	Lamiako towards Etxebarri
Location

Areeta is an underground station on Line 1 of the Bilbao Metro. It is located in the neighborhood of Areeta, in the municipality of Getxo. The station opened as part of the metro on 11 November 1995, replacing an older overground station.

== History ==
The station, then known as Las Arenas, first opened to the public in 1887 as the western terminus of the Bilbao-Las Arenas railway. It was an at-grade station, covered by a large train shed. The station was originally built as a cul-de-sac, but after the extension of the line to Plentzia in 1893, it was renovated as trains continued along the coast past the station. The station had two side platforms and was one of the most important train stations of the entire railway.

Starting in 1947, the narrow-gauge railway companies that operated within the Bilbao metropolitan area were merged to become Ferrocarriles y Transportes Suburbanos, shortened FTS and the first precedent of today's Bilbao Metro. In 1977, the FTS network was transferred to the public company FEVE and in 1982 to the recently created Basque Railways. In the 1980s it was decided the station, just like most of the former railway line, would be integrated into Line 1 of the metro, with the new station opening underground now as part of the metro network on 11 November 1995.

The new underground station was designed by English architect Norman Foster. Concurrently, it was renamed Areeta, following the Basque language orthographic rules and in replacement of the former Las Arenas name, which was in Spanish.

== Station layout ==
It is an underground station with a single island platform.

=== Access ===
- 1, Langileria street
- 1, Gabriel Aresti street
- Station's interior

== Services ==
The station is served by Line 1 from Etxebarri to Plentzia. The station is also served by regional Bizkaibus bus services.

=== Future ===
In 2022, it was announced that a tunnel will connect both banks of the Ibaizabal-Nervión estuary in 2028, incorporating a shuttle train that will connect the Areeta and Sestao (Line 2) stations in four minutes. Work on the tunnel is scheduled to begin in the summer of 2024, with a planned investment of 450 million euros.
