= Neguri (Bilbao Metro) =

Rapid transit station in Getxo, Basque Country, Spain

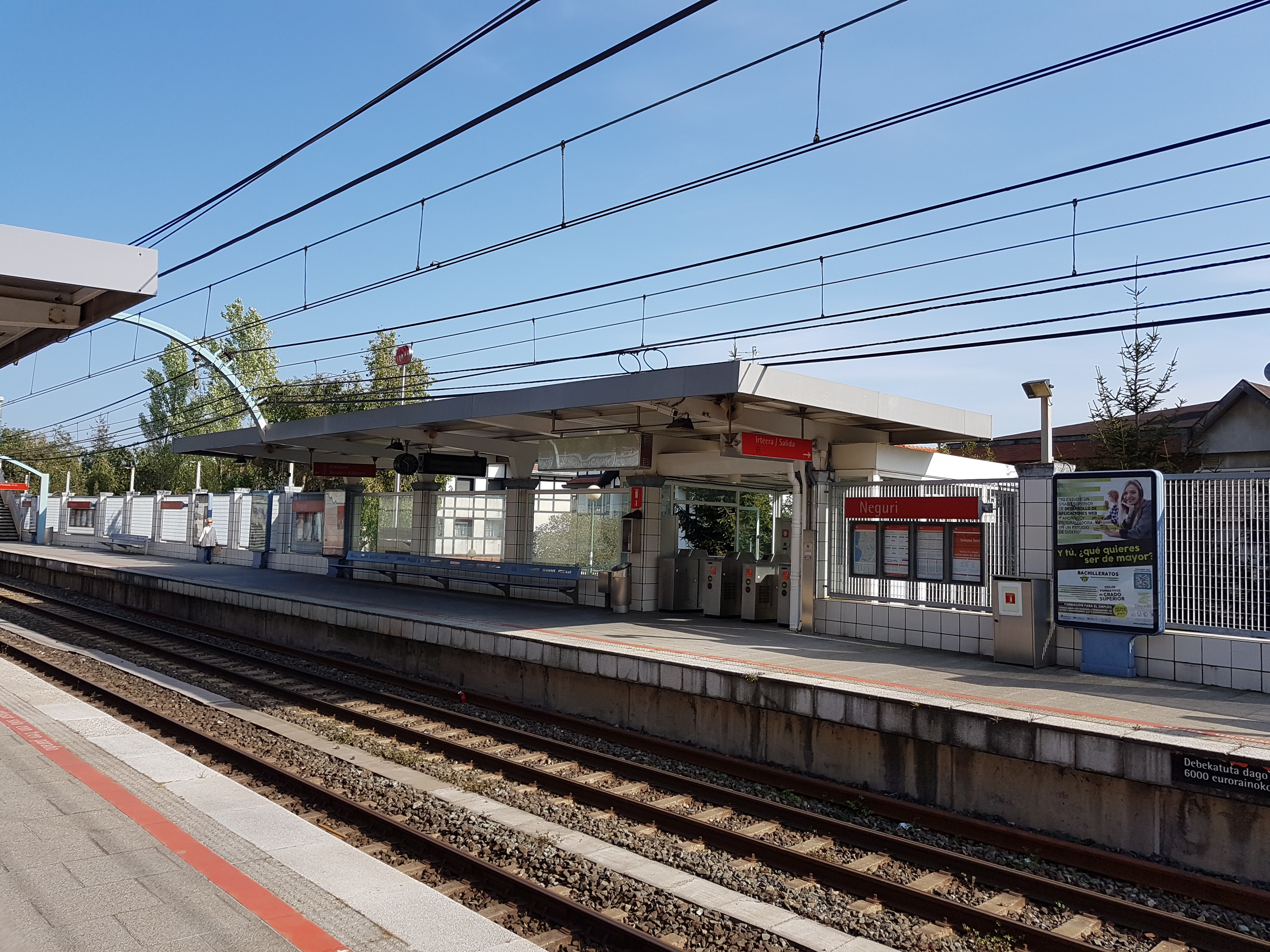
- View of the station

General information
- Location: 3 Zarrenabarri St. 48992 Getxo; Spain
- Coordinates: 43°20′25″N 3°00′20″W
- Owner: Biscay Transport Consortium; Euskal Trenbide Sarea
- Line: Line 1
- Platforms: 2 side platforms
- Tracks: 2

Construction
- Structure type: At-grade
- Platform levels: 1
- Parking: No
- Accessible: Yes

Other information
- Fare zone: Zone 2

History
- Opened: 15 September 1893
- Rebuilt: 11 November 1995

Passengers
- 2021: 518,481

Services
Preceding station	Metro Bilbao	Following station
Aiboa towards Plentzia	Line 1	Gobela towards Etxebarri
Location

Neguri is a station on Line 1 of the Bilbao Metro. It is located in the neighborhood of Neguri, in the municipality of Getxo. The station opened as part of the metro on 11 November 1995, replacing an older station.

== History ==
The station first opened to the public in 1893 as part of the Las Arenas-Plentzia railway, operated by the Las Arenas-Plencia Railway Company. At the time it was known as Guecho station. At Las Arenas, in the municipality of Getxo, the line connected with the Bilbao-Las Arenas railway. Direct services between Bilbao and Neguri started in 1901. The station was at-grade with two side platforms and a station building following similar design and architectural styles as other stations from the line.

Starting in 1947, the narrow-gauge railway companies that operated within the Bilbao metropolitan area were merged to become Ferrocarriles y Transportes Suburbanos, shortened FTS and the first precedent of today's Bilbao Metro. In 1977, the FTS network was transferred to the public company FEVE and in 1982 to the recently created Basque Railways. In the 1980s it was decided the station, just like most of the former railway line, would be integrated into Line 1 of the metro. The station, which opened as part of the metro network on 11 November 1995, was built 100 meters north of the old station building, which since became disused.

The old station is one of the few buildings of the former Bilbao-Las Arenas railway still standing, although in state of disuse. Due to risk of collapse, the building was stabilized in 2018.

== Station layout ==
It is an at-grade, open-air station with two side platforms.

=== Access ===
- 1 Zarrenebarri St
- 13 Cristobal Cólon St
- Station's interior

== Services ==
The station is served by Line 1 from Etxebarri to Plentzia.

== Gallery ==
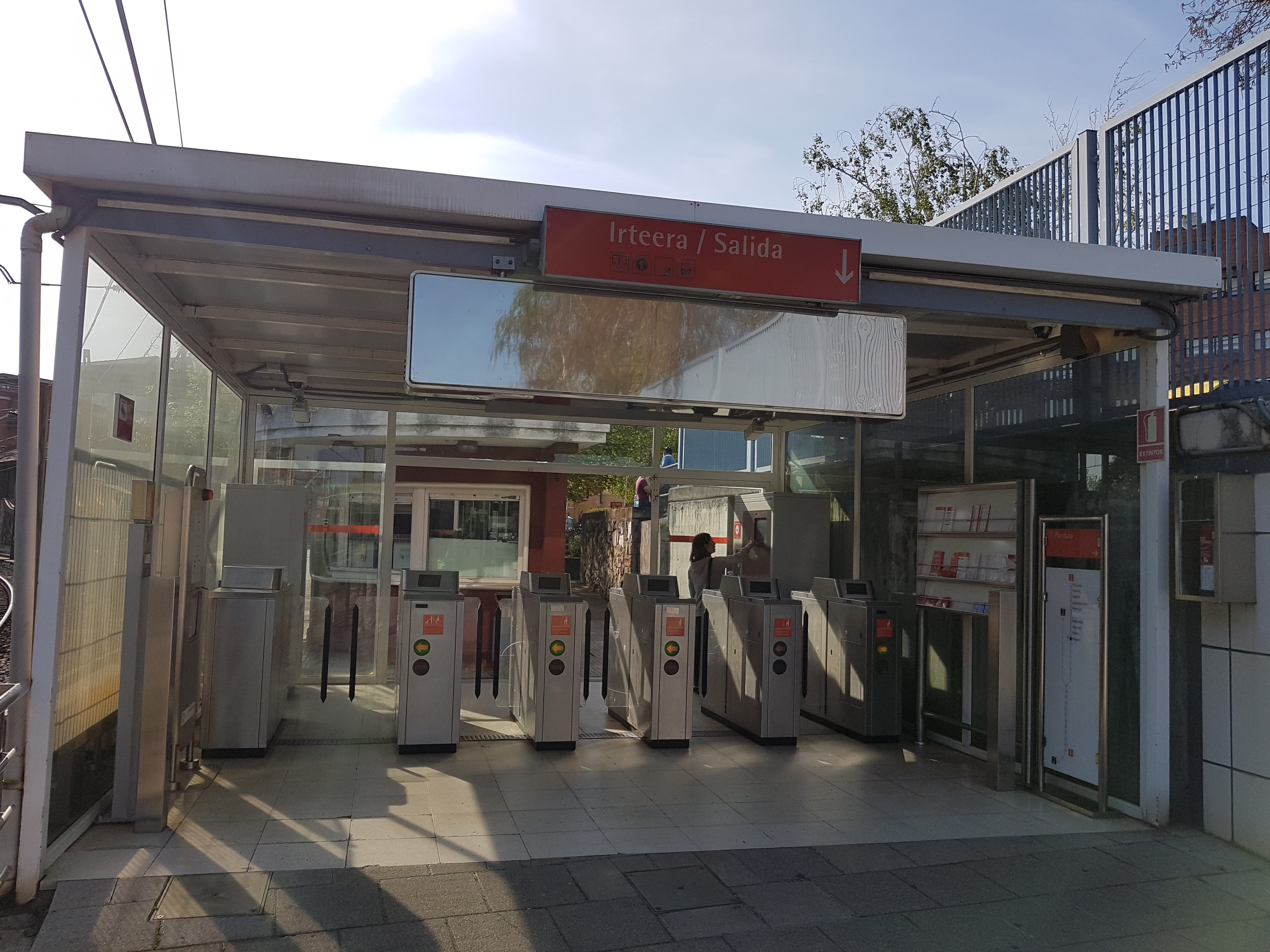
Zarrenabarri street entrance

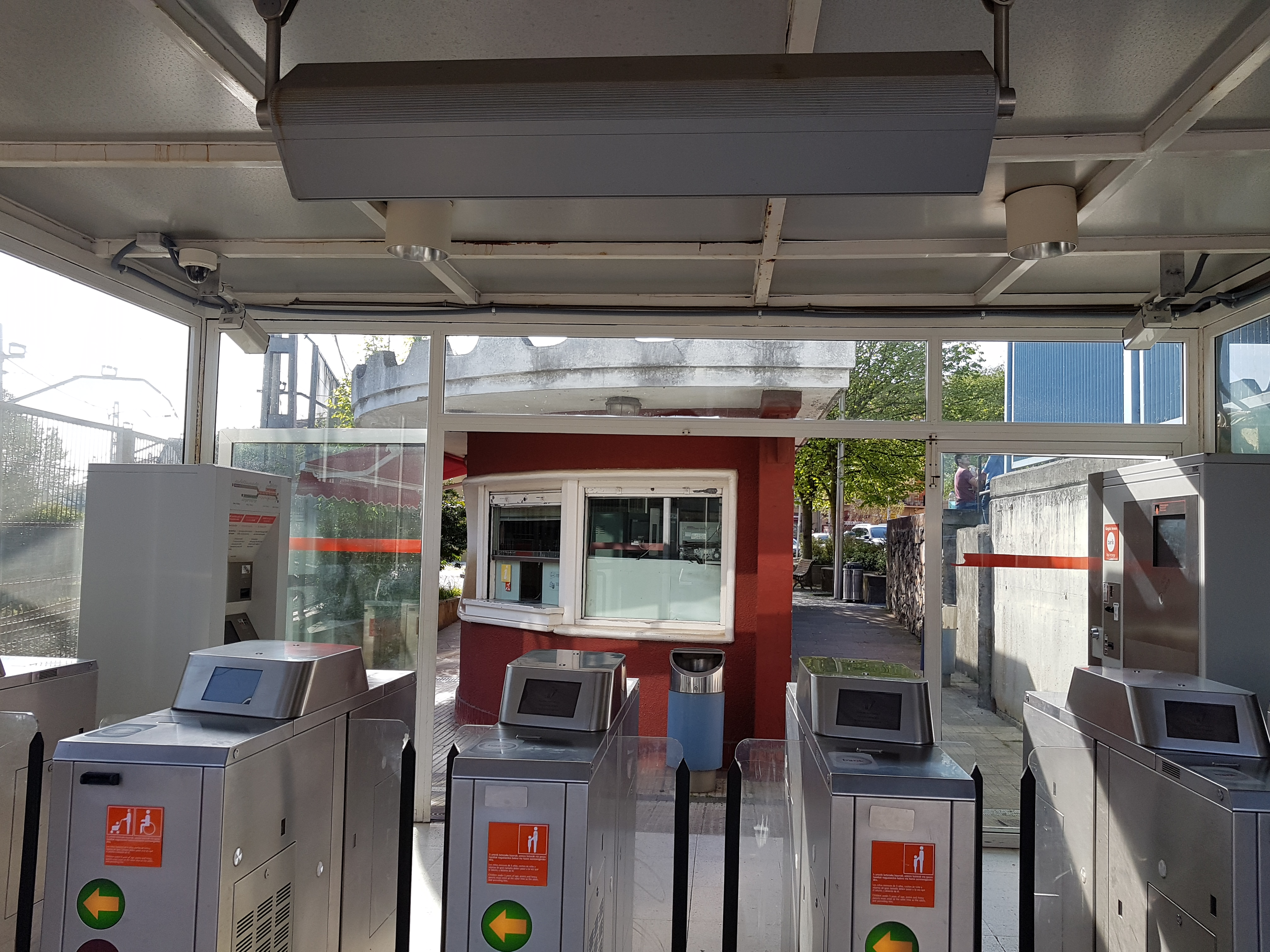
Validation machines

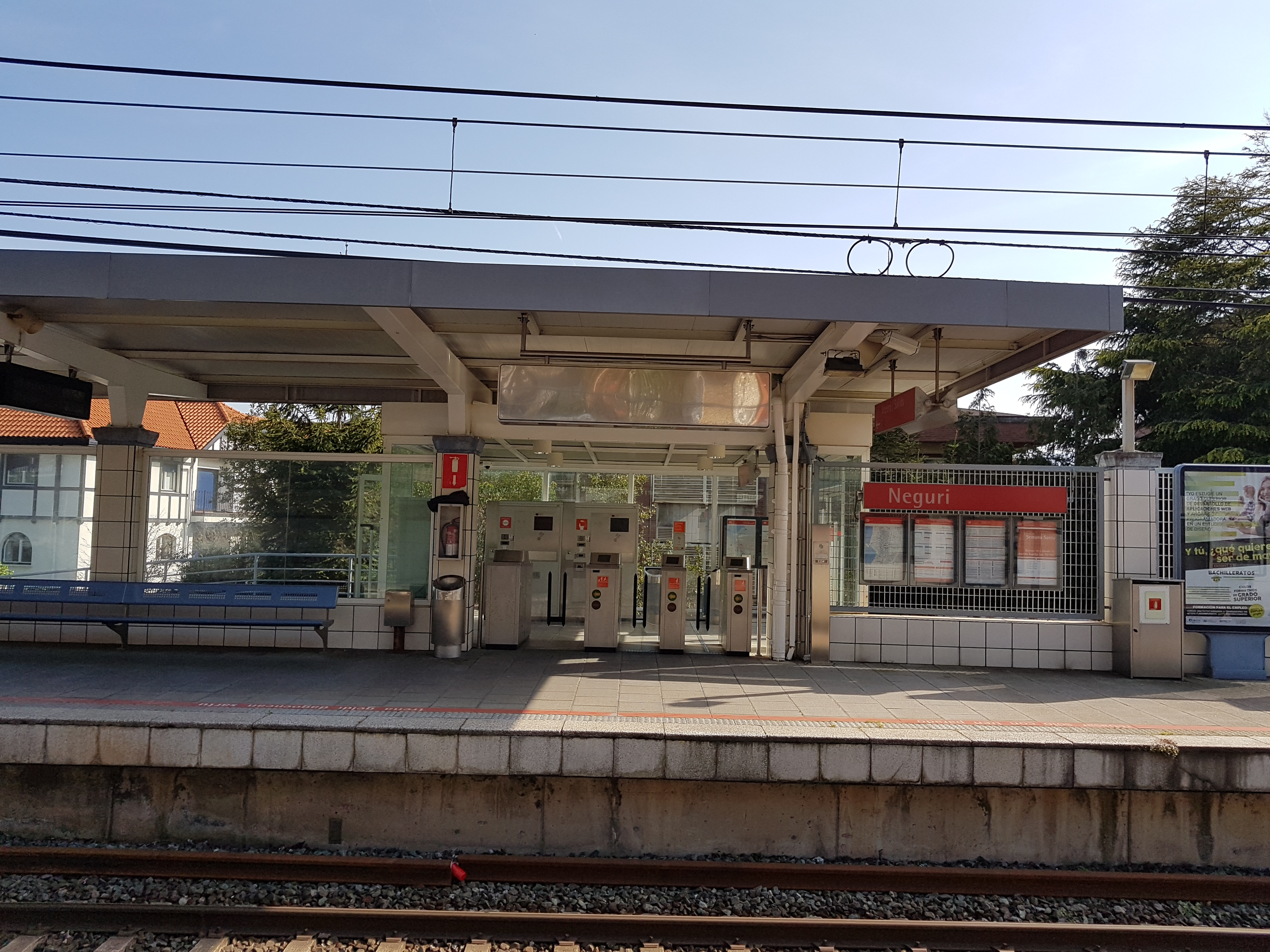
Cristobal Colón street entrance
