= Ibarbengoa (Bilbao Metro) =

Rapid transit station in Getxo, Basque Country, Spain

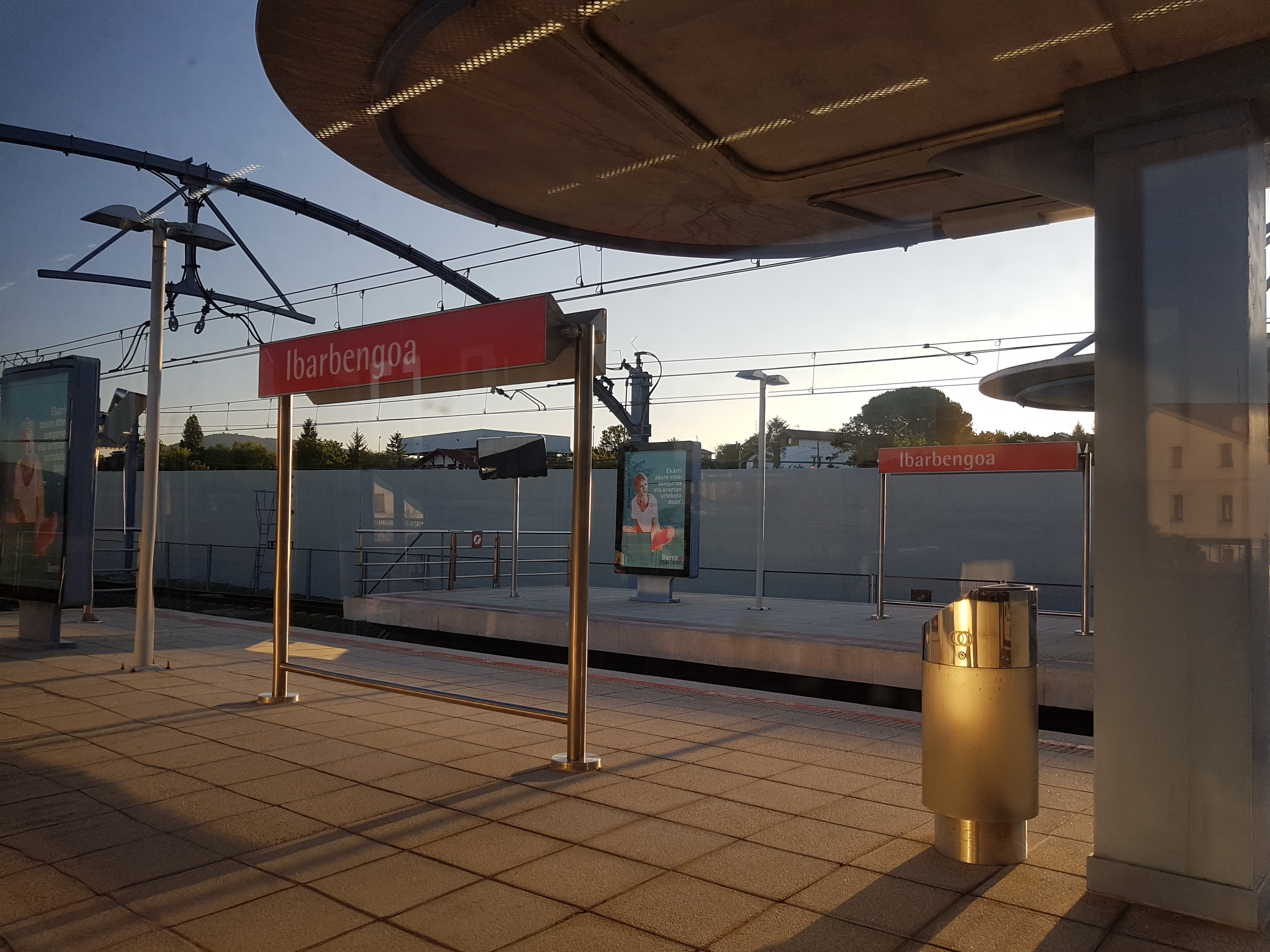
- View of the station

General information
- Location: Mariturri St. 48993 Getxo; Spain
- Coordinates: 43°21′49″N 3°00′24″W
- Owner: Biscay Transport Consortium; Euskal Trenbide Sarea
- Line: Line 1
- Platforms: 2 island platforms
- Tracks: 3

Construction
- Structure type: At-grade
- Platform levels: 1
- Parking: Yes
- Accessible: Yes

Other information
- Fare zone: Zone 2

History
- Opened: 15 June 2020

Passengers
- 2021: 63,016

Services
Preceding station	Metro Bilbao	Following station
Berango towards Plentzia	Line 1	Bidezabal towards Etxebarri
Location

Ibarbengoa is a station on Line 1 of the Bilbao Metro. It is located in the neighbourhood of Andra Mari, in the municipality of Getxo. The station was constructed to serve the northernmost part of Getxo and to become the northern terminus of services terminating in Getxo. The station currently serves as the northern terminus for select metro services. The station opened on 15 June 2020.

== History ==
The construction of a new station in the northern, and mostly rural, neighborhood of Andra Mari in Getxo had been planned for some time, being first announced in 2010 as part of a new urban plan for the area. The plan included the construction of around 8,000 homes, a new metro station and a park and ride facility. The plan was met with strong opposition from the inhabitants of Andra Mari, who claimed the plan benefited residential speculation and the urbanization of an until then mostly rural area.

The construction of the new station finished in 2014, but further protests delayed the construction of the parking facility, as a result the station remained closed. The parking facility was finally finished on late 2019, but its opening was delayed due to problems related the park and ride facility next to the station. The station opened on 15 June 2020.

== Station layout ==
It is an overground station with two island platforms.

=== Access ===
- Mariturri St.
- Station's interior

== Services ==
The station is served by Line 1 from Etxebarri to Plentzia. The station is also served by regional Bizkaibus bus services.
