= Neguri =

Coordinates: 43°20′20″N 3°00′22″W

Neguri is an affluent district of Getxo, in Biscay, Basque Country in Spain. It is traditionally regarded as the residence of the prosperous Basque industrial bourgeoisie. Its name, coined in the 19th century, means Winter Town in Basque language.

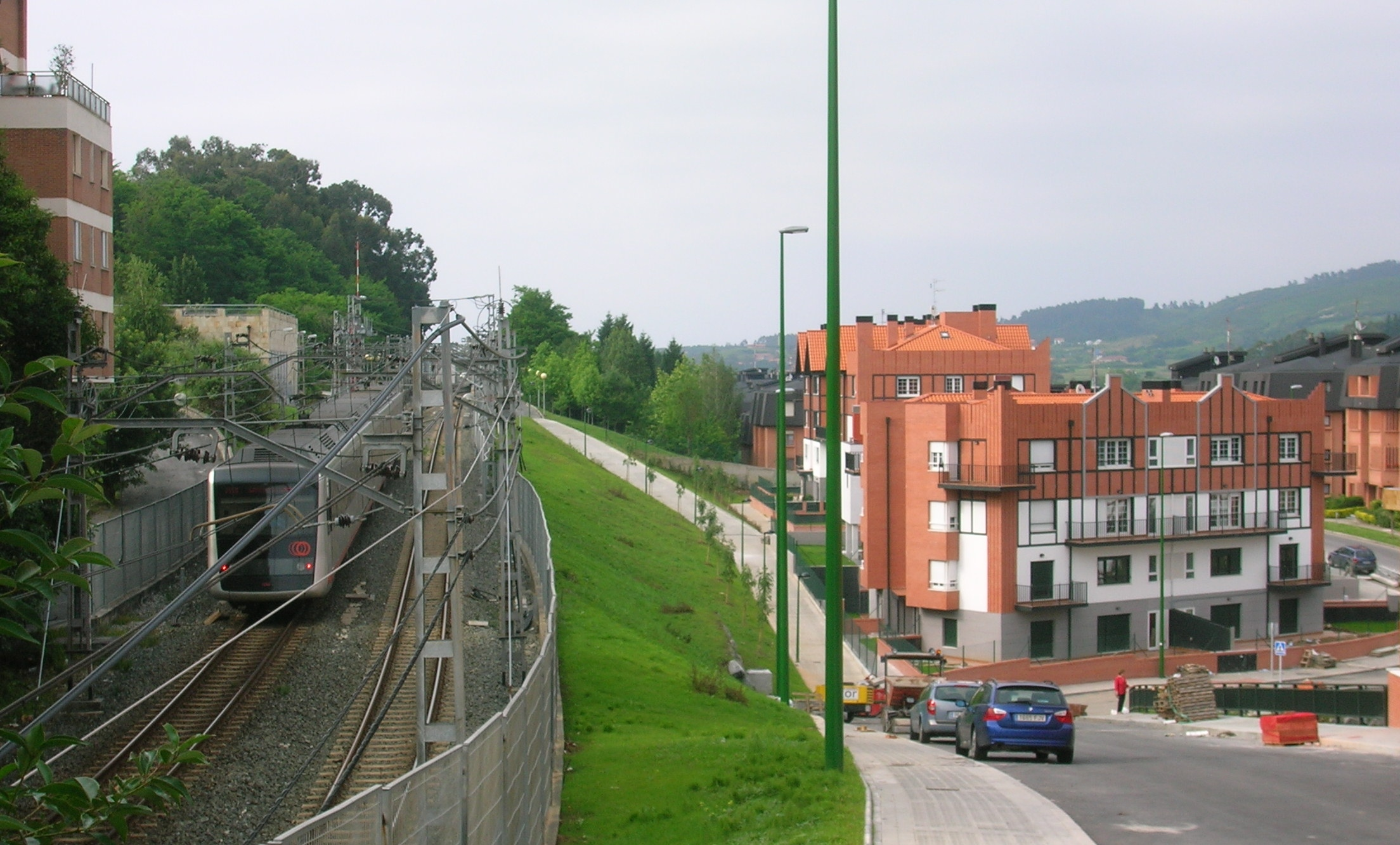
Aiboa neighbourhood of Neguri

The neighbourhood is serviced by two Bilbao Metro Line 1 stations, Neguri and Aiboa.
