= Evaristo de Churruca y Brunet =

Spanish engineer (1841–1917)

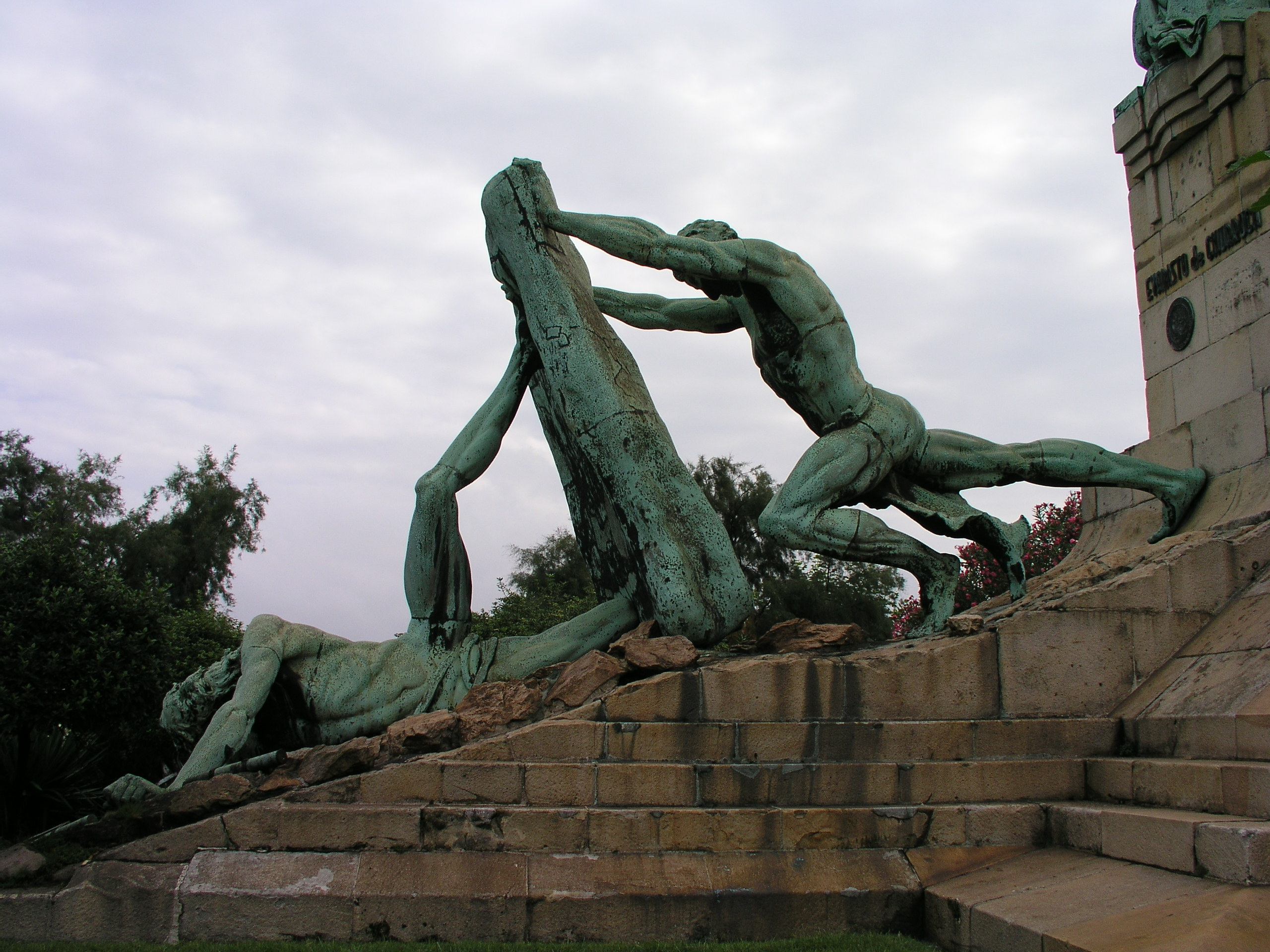
Monument to Evaristo Churruca in Getxo.

Evaristo de Churruca y Brunet (Oltza, 1841 – Bilbao, 1917) was a Spanish engineer. He directed diverse construction work in Murcia and Biscay and subsequently was transferred to Puerto Rico, where he was in charge of the installation of the telegraphic network of the island and carried out a study for the improvement of the port of San Juan. Returning to Spain, he took charge of the works of the exterior Port of Bilbao and canalization of the Nervion River.

A monument was erected to honour him in the town of Getxo at the mouth of the Nervion River, which he definitely straightened allowing the further developing of Bilbao's industrial power.
