= Berango =

- Municipality
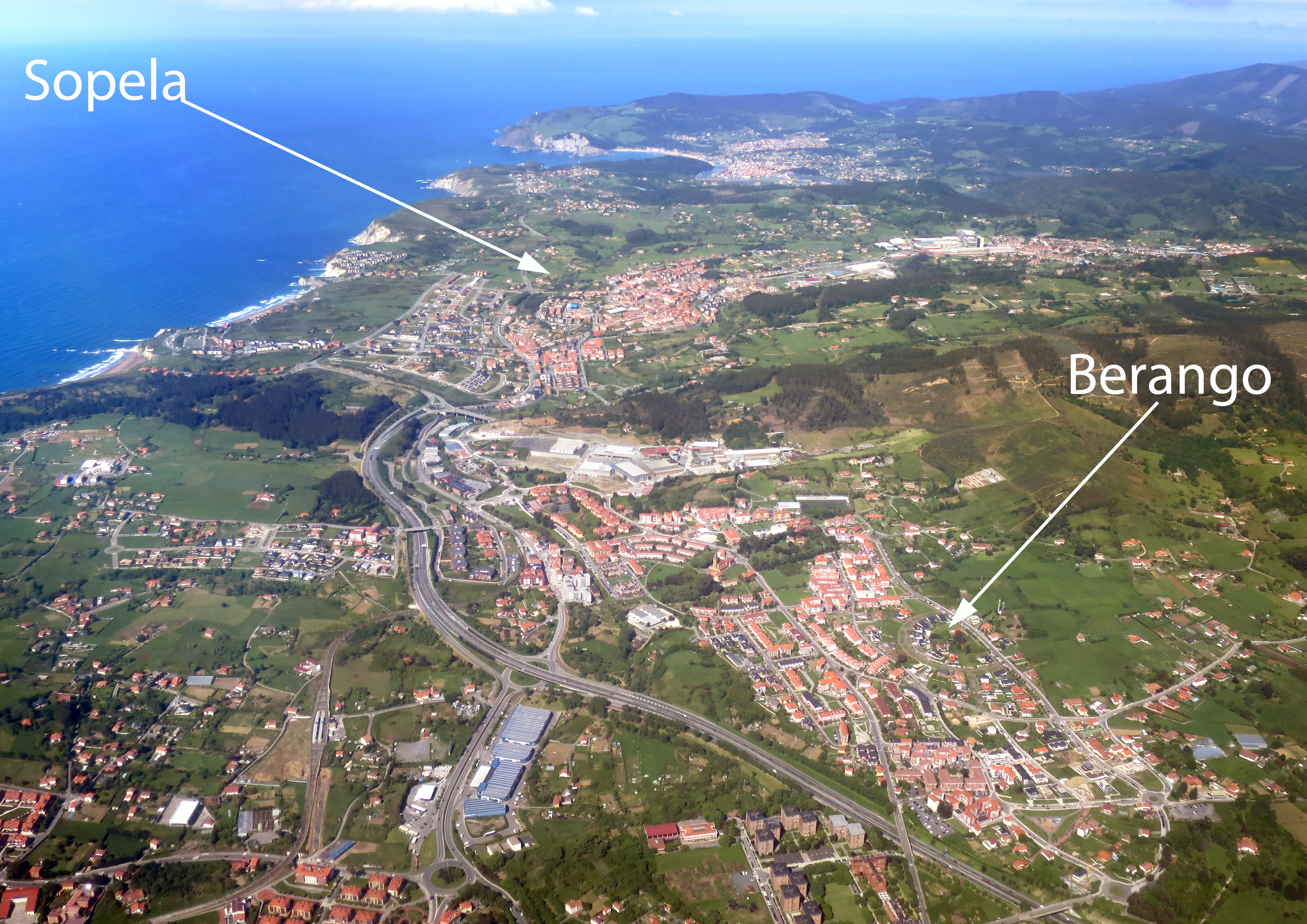

- Flag Coat of arms

- Location of Berango within the Basque Country Location of Berango within Spain
- Coordinates: 43°21′54″N 2°59′24″W
- Country: Spain
- Autonomous community: Basque Country
- Province: Biscay
- Comarca: Greater Bilbao

Government
  - Mayor: María Isabel Landa Gaubeka (Basque Nationalist Party)

Area
  - Total: 8.9 km^{2} (3.4 sq mi)
- Elevation: 31 m (102 ft)

Population (2025-01-01)
  - Total: 8,242
  - Density: 930/km^{2} (2,400/sq mi)
- Demonym: Basque: berangotarra
- Time zone: UTC+1 (CET)
  - Summer (DST): UTC+2 (CEST)
- Postal code: 48640
- Website: Official website

Berango is a town and municipality located in the province of Biscay, in the region known as "Greater Bilbao" in the autonomous community of the Basque Country, Spain covering an area of 8.9 km² and a population of 8,242 inhabitants in 2025. Population density is 930 inhabitants per square kilometre.

== Geography ==
Berango is bordered by Sopelana in the north, with Urduliz in the northeast, with Erandio in the southeast, and with Guetxo to the west. In this region, mountains such as Munarrikolanda, Saiherri and Agirremendi stand out. The Gobela river passes through the municipality and empties into the Bahía de El Abra. Moreover, Berango receives Larrañazubi's streams and several natural fountains.
