= Getxo =

Getxo Guecho (Spanish)
- Municipality
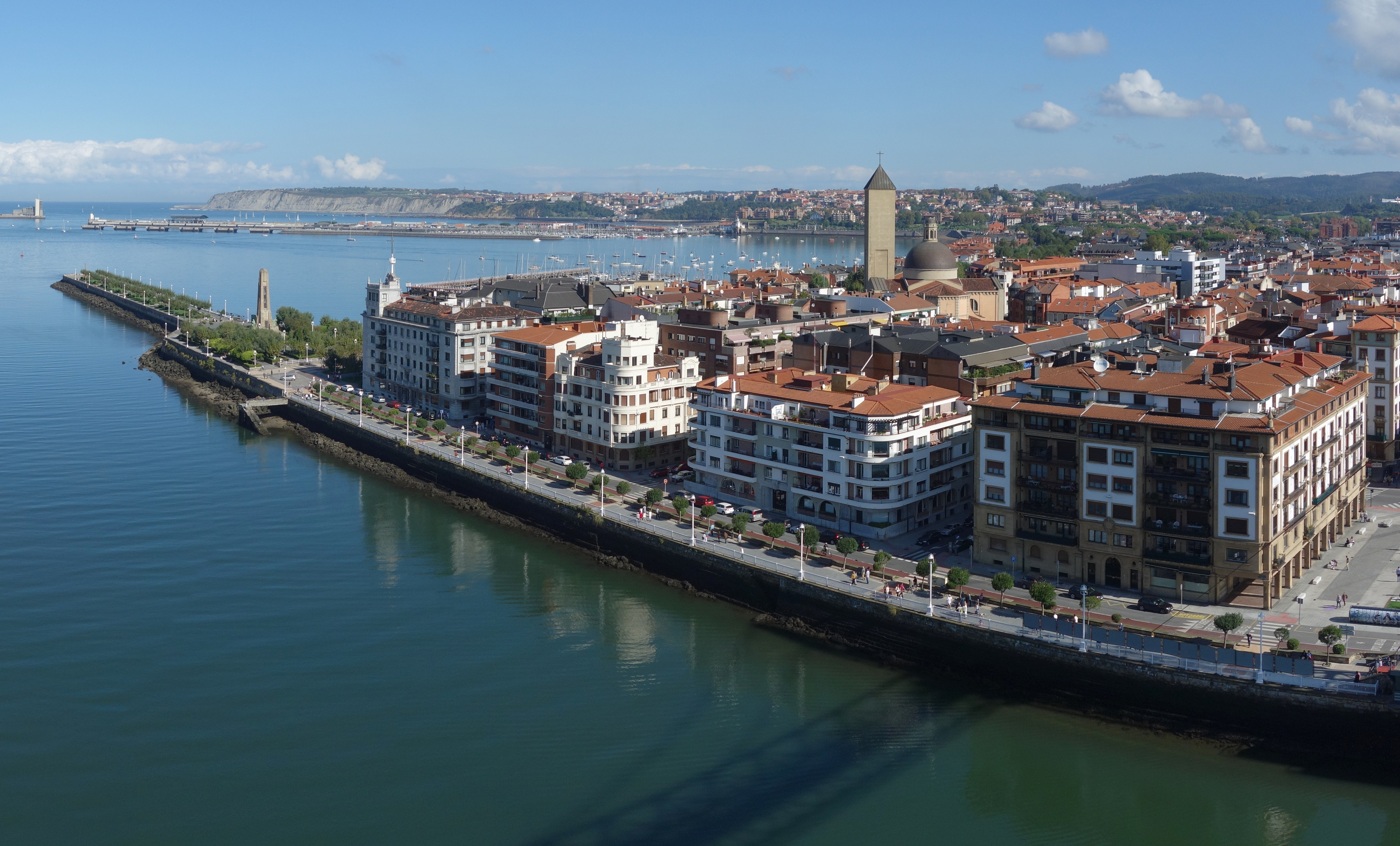
- View of Getxo from Vizcaya Bridge with its neighborhood of Las Arenas in the foreground

- Coat of arms
- Motto(s): Kaltea Dagianak Bizarra Lepoan ("He who makes evil, the beard at his back")
- Location of Getxo within the Basque Country
- Coordinates: 43°20′39″N 3°0′23″W
- Country: Spain
- Autonomous community: Basque Country
- Province: Biscay
- Comarca: Greater Bilbao
- Judicial district: Getxo
- Districts: Aiboa, Algorta, Las Arenas, Neguri, Romo and Getxoko Andra Mari
- Founded: 1075

Government
  - Alcalde: Amaia Agirre (2019) (PNV)

Area
  - Total: 11.87 km^{2} (4.58 sq mi)
- Elevation: 50 m (160 ft)

Population (2025)
  - Total: 75,967
  - Density: 6,400/km^{2} (16,580/sq mi)
- Demonym: Getxotarra
- Time zone: UTC+1 (CET)
  - Summer (DST): UTC+2 (CEST)
- Postal code: 48991 - 48993 - 48990 - 48930
- Website: www.getxo.eus

Getxo (Basque: [getʃo]), Spanish: Guecho) is a city and municipality in the province of Biscay in the autonomous community of the Basque Country in Spain. It is part of Greater Bilbao, with a population of 75,967 is the 2nd-largest suburb of Bilbao. Getxo is mostly an affluent residential area.

== History ==
Getxo (formerly spelt Guecho) was a parish (elizatea, anteiglesia'), originally a rural area, including a large beach at the mouth of the Estuary of Bilbao, centered on the little fishing village of Algorta. The parish council met at the church of Getxoko Andra Mari (Basque) or Santa María de Guecho (Spanish) (both mean Saint Mary of Getxo), not far from the headland called Punta Galea.

The town's coat of arms has an oak with two cauldrons chained to its branches and the motto Kaltea Dagianak Bizarra Lepoan (Basque for "Who makes evil, the beard at the back"). It is a proverb meaning that the evil doers look back, fearing revenge.

With industrialisation in the 19th century, some parts of Getxo evolved into residential areas for the rich bourgeois class. A residential area called Neguri (Basque for "Winter Town") came into being. The village of Algorta grew around the church of Saint Nicholas (San Nicolás) and the canalisation of the firth, provided for the colonisation of the beach, where a district called Areeta in Basque and Las Arenas (Spanish for "The Sands") was built. Near Areeta / Las Arenas, on the other side of the road to Bilbao, there grew a working-class district called Erromo, similar to the one that grew near Neguri: Neguri Langile. Finally, in the 20th century, urban development reached the rural areas of Getxoko Andra Mari.

Getxo, as well as the surrounding area known as Uribe-Kosta, grew rapidly in the last decades of the 20th century. While in the early 1980s the town had only 50,000 inhabitants, it has now more than 83,000. The surrounding towns of Leioa, Berango and Sopelana have also multiplied their population in the same period.

Getxo was hit by the Basque Conflict several times, with the town being the location of many ETA attacks. The deadliest of these was an ambush in October 1978 when three civil guards were killed and the most recent the car bomb attack on May 19, 2008. Many activists of the organisation have been born in Getxo, such as Arkaitz Goikoetxea.

== Geography ==
It is located 14 km (~8 miles) north of Bilbao, in the province and historical Territory of Biscay, in the community of the Basque Country, in the north of Spain. It has an area of 11.64 square kilometres (4.49 sq mi). It borders in the north with Sopelana, in the east with Berango and Leioa, in the south with Portugalete and in the west with the Bay of the Cove.

=== Neighborhoods ===
The municipality officially encompasses the neighborhoods of Las Arenas, Algorta, Romo, Neguri, and Santa María de Getxo. But for the inhabitants of Getxo there is a more thorough division:

- Las Arenas: Las Mercedes, Santa Ana, Zugazarte y Antiguo Golf.
- Neguri: Neguri, San Ignacio.
- Algorta: Algorta centre, Alango, María Cristina, Sarrikobaso, Arrigunaga, Villamonte, La Humedad, Aldapas, Fadura, Ereaga, Usategui, Portu Zaharra / Puerto Viejo (the Old Port, the original core of Algorta) and Bidezábal.
- Aiboa
- Santa María de Guecho / Getxoko Andra Mari: Aixerrota, Malakate, Punta Galea, Avenida del Ángel, La Venta y Azkorri.
- Romo

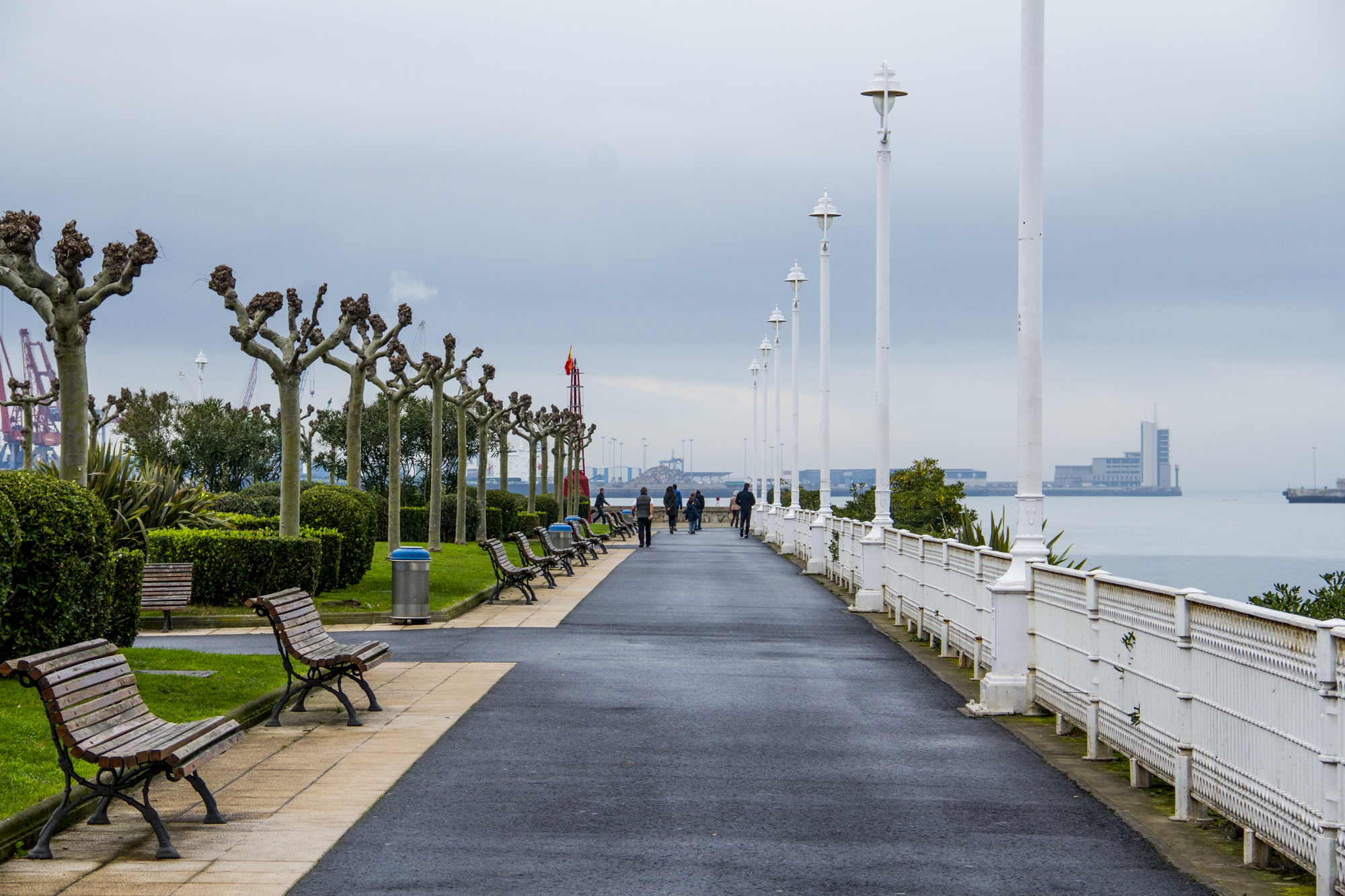
Churruca pier

The founding nucleus of the town of Getxo, the elizate or anteiglesia is what currently is known as Santa María or Andra Mari, which was originally a group of country houses or "baserris" around Saint Mary's church.

Las Arenas and Neguri arose in the late nineteenth century as residential areas for the Basque industrial bourgeoisie. Neguri neighborhood is characterized by the palaces in which lived the elite of the bourgeoisie and where nowadays many of the people with more resources of Getxo live. The name of Neguri was coined by Resurrección María de Azkue, since previously it was called Aretxetaurre (before Aretxete). Neguri comes from the merger of two Basque words: negu and uri (winter and city respectively): Neguko hiri, Neguri, the winter city designed, as has been noted, for the Basque bourgeoisie.

The neighborhood of Algorta is the district of largest population of Getxo. The greatest expansion was in the 70s when middle-class families decided to find a more comfortable place to live rather than in the neighborhoods of the left bank of the Nervion.

Romo neighborhood was built in the beginning to house the working class, formerly separated by the train barriers from Las Arenas. Nowadyas is separated by Gobelas river from one side and reaches the traffic circle of Romo. Originally the district was shaped like a horseshoe. It borders the neighbourhood of Ibaiondo (which belongs to the municipality of Leioa), so much so that the road from the roundabout Romo until the bank of the estuary of Bilbao is the municipal border between Getxo and Leioa. One sidewalk belongs to each municipality.

The neighborhood of Santa María de Getxo stood longer as a mostly rural area until the last third of the 20th century. It still has several farmhouses, arable fields and pastures and but there are also many villas and houses built in the 1990s.

== Demographics ==
Historical population
Year	Pop.	±%
1842	981	—
1857	2,079	+111.9%
1877	2,634	+26.7%
1887	3,686	+39.9%
1900	5,411	+46.8%
1910	6,891	+27.4%
1920	10,901	+58.2%
1930	15,295	+40.3%
1940	18,346	+19.9%
1950	19,250	+4.9%
1960	22,918	+19.1%
1970	39,162	+70.9%
1981	67,793	+73.1%
1991	79,954	+17.9%
2001	82,285	+2.9%
2011	80,252	−2.5%
2021	77,101	−3.9%
Source: INE

As of 2025, the population is 75,967, of which 46.9% are male, and 53.1% are female. Minors make up 14.2% of the population, and seniors make up 29.0%.

=== Immigration ===
As of 2025, immigrants make up 12.7% of the population. The 5 largest foreign countries of birth are Bolivia, Colombia, Paraguay, Honduras, and Peru.

== Administration ==
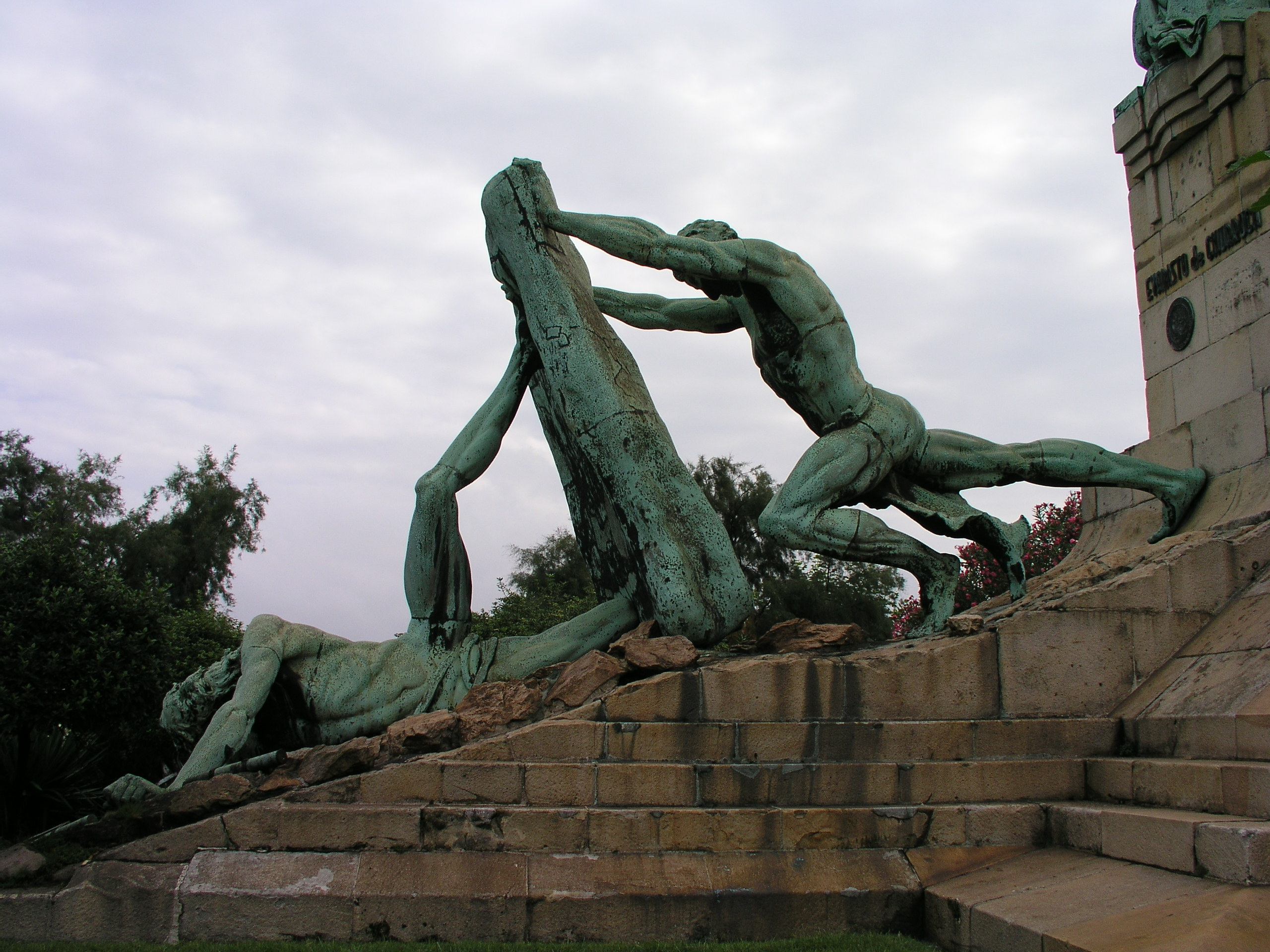
Monument to Evaristo Churruca in Las Arenas.

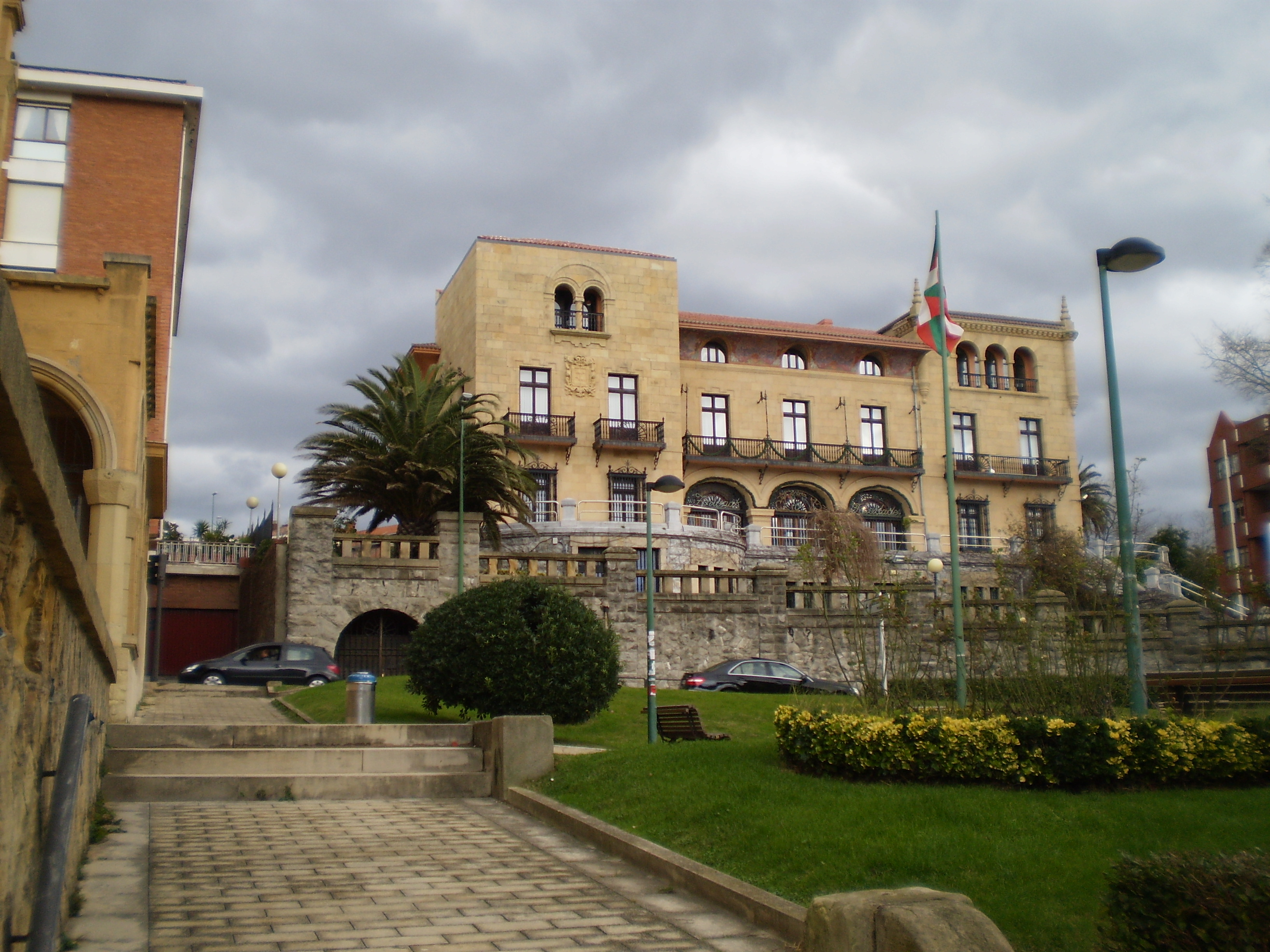
Getxo's town hall

Getxo's office of mayor has been continuously in the hands of the Basque Nationalist Party (EAJ-PNV) since democracy was restored in 1978 (Local Elections). Since 1991, the major opposition party has been the Partido Popular(PP). As of the 2019 local elections other parties represented on the Town Council are EH Bildu, the Socialist Party of Euskadi (PSE-EE), and the Elkarrekin Podemos alliance (EP).

Political party	Votes	% votes	town councillors
EAJ-PNV	16 344	39,06%	11
PP	6 881	16,45%	5
EH Bildu	6 311	15,08%	4
PSE-EE	4 420	10,56%	3
UP-EA-IU-EQUO-Berdeak	3 334	7,94%	2

Getxo has five different districts, which serve administrative and electoral purposes: Algorta, Las Arenas, Romo, Santa María de Getxo and Neguri.

== Sights ==
Getxo has some tourist appeal with easy access to four beaches and to the regional economic capital of Bilbao. It has a yacht harbour, a golf course, and several sports complexes (both public and private). A dynamic, semi-autonomous Department of Culture organises many events on a regular basis, including several international music festivals given over to jazz, the blues and folk.

The town has many houses of architectural interest, including the Town Hall and several churches, as well as private dwellings belonging to members of the wealthy industrialist class of Biscay. The Old Harbour district of Algorta and several parks with views across to the bay called the Bilbao Abra are also worth a visit.

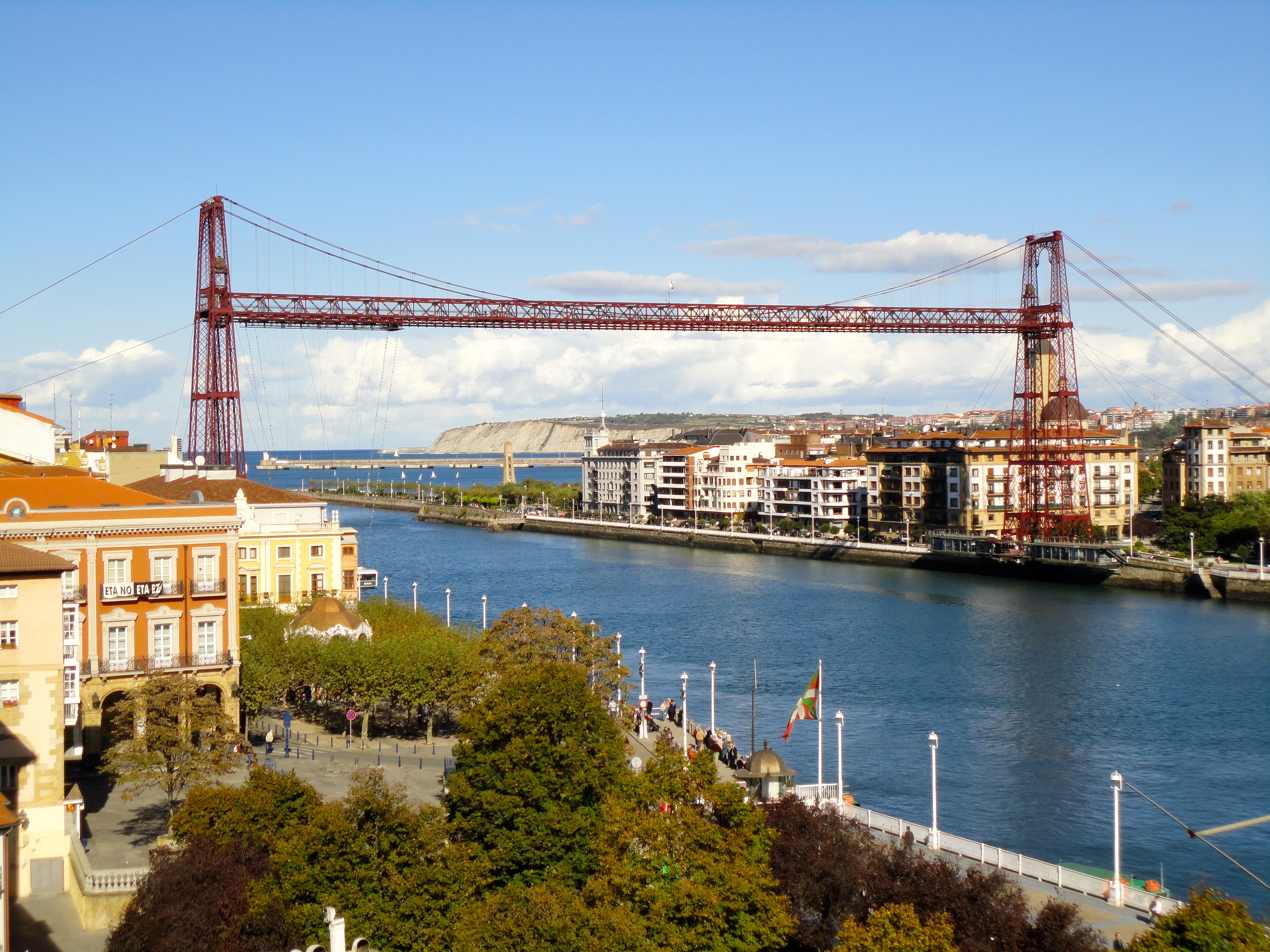
Vizcaya Bridge

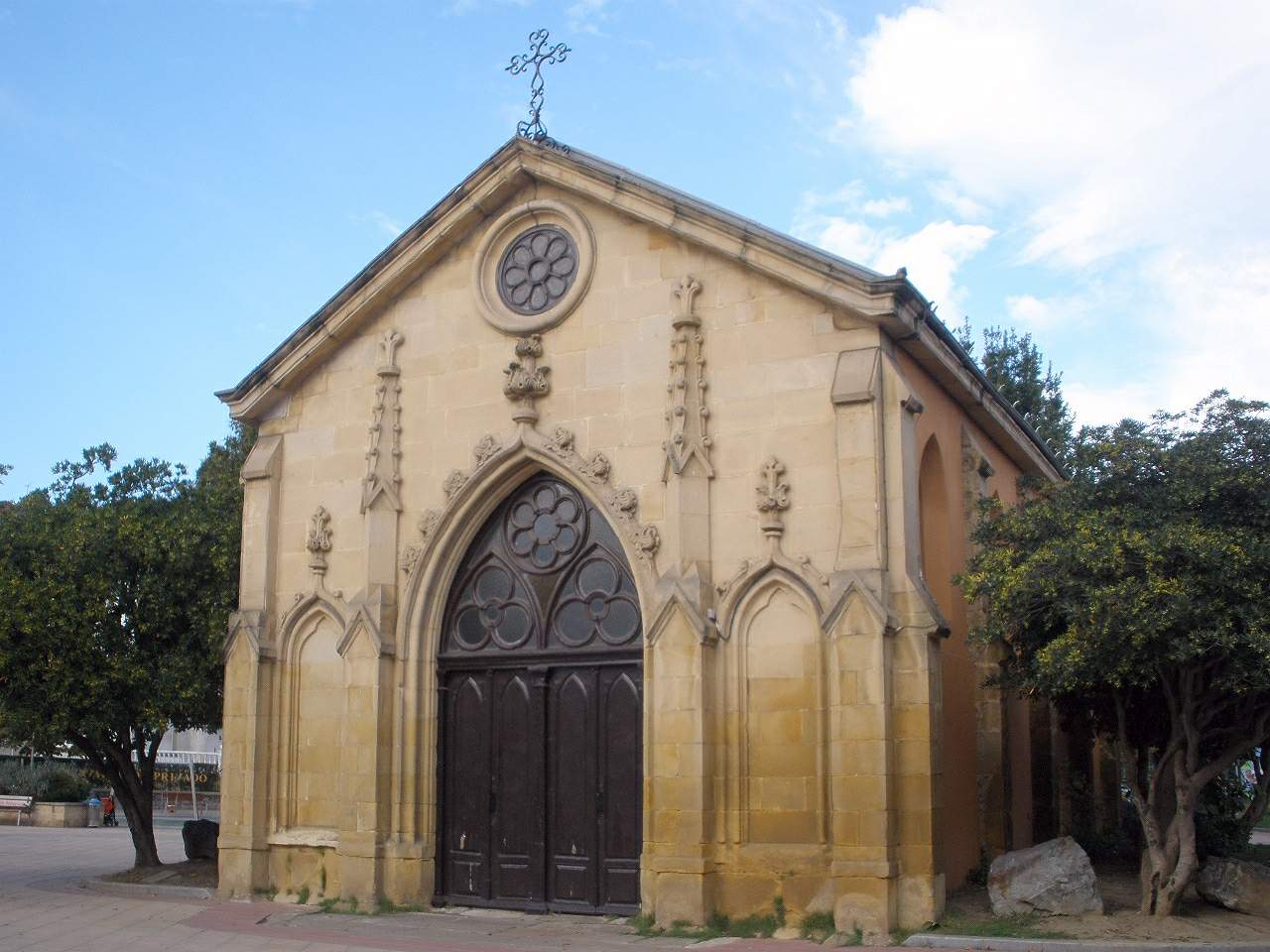
Saint Anne's Chapel

=== Andra Mari Church ===
This romanesque church built in the 12th century took in the first inhabitants. This church suffered diverse reformations and the church that nowadays we can admire is mostly from the 17th century based on the Baroque period. Inside the church is a sculpture of the Virgin and her son.

=== Aixerrota Windmill ===
This monument is the only antique windmill that is still standing. The construction of the windmill was undertaken between 1726 and 1727 due to a huge drought and was focused on corn and feed production. The windmill, due to lack of use, was set up as a home during the 19th century. The name of Aixerrota comes from the Basque aixe ("wind") and errota ("mill"). It produced two types of flour, fine and ordinary. The first historic reference of the windmill property was in 1725. This land now sits in the village of Subyaga-Etxebarria. Nowadays, it belongs to a catering company and has been completely restored. It also has a restaurant and an art gallery.

=== Prince's castle or La Galea Fort ===
This military building was constructed in the 18th century to protect the commercial traffic in Bilbao. Situated in a strategic place, this fort is located along the bay. "Galea" derives from the French word gale which means "cliff". This fort also was named "Prince´s Castle"; it is an interesting example of fortification, being a unique model of military construction in Biscay. The situation in which it is located in the past was privileged, thanks to the cliff, people could guard enemy fleets and could see the fleets that approached. In 1740, the council ordered Jaime Sycre to create the fort as a measurement to reinforce the coast. The historic datum holds that this fort was never attacked. When the military fort was abandoned, lighthouse construction started in 1782. Nowadays the fort is a municipal property.

=== Saint Anne's Chapel (Santa Ana) ===
In Las Arenas there are a number of buildings of the neogothic style in Biscay. By order of the Agirre family the chapel was built by Modesto de Echániz y Zavalla in 1864. Maximo Aguirre was a well-known business man that obtained lands in Las Arenas. Nowadays this chapel, is one of the best examples of neogotic in Biscay. It is located in an urban area, surrounded of little green spaces and in a peaceful place. In the construction of the chapel bishop demanded build a bell. The chapel is rectangular. Since 1864 to 1876 was the unique worship place in Las Arenas and nowadays belongs to Maximo Aguirre's family. Concretely it belongs to MS. Carmen Jauregui. Nowadays is not usually open and this chapel is used for weddings.

=== Vizcaya Bridge o El puente colgante ===
Located in Las Arenas it is the oldest bridge of its kind and it was designed by the architect Alberto Palacios y Elissague. It was built in 1893 with the purpose of communicating between both sides of the river and the municipalities of Getxo and Portugalete. It was made with the iron extracted from the mountains in the area and it is one of the main monuments from the industrial revolution, it is the main symbol of the region.

=== Galerias de Punta Begoña ===
This massive stone structure was built in 1919 as a continuation of Getxo's defensive wall. It has fallen into disrepair, though long-term restoration is underway. While public access is restricted, free one-hour guided visits in Basque and Spanish are offered throughout the year, with some English-language tours in August.

These galleries and viewing balconies are of extraordinary architectural, visual and environmental interest. Their floor plan is irregular, following the outline of the Punta Begoña promontory on which they stand. A fort defending the bay stood on this same spot from the 17th century to the 19th.

The galleries were designed by architect Ricardo Bastida in 1918 in an eclectic but mainly classical style. They were commissioned by Horacio Echevarrieta, a renowned businessman, and their main function was complete the containing wall holding back the cliff below Atxekolandeta, the area on which the mansion of Echavarrieta family stood (this English-style mansion designed by architect Gregorio lbarreche in 1910, is no longer standing). The owner fitted out the galleries with various rooms and passages designed as a leisure area.

They are built in a blend of masonry, ashlars and concrete on a high sloping masonry base, and comprise three gallery sections at different heights, ending in terraces and balustraded viewing balconies.

== Festivals ==
Several annual festivals are celebrated in Getxo. Some of them are fiestas patronales (patronage festivals, held in the days around the date dedicated to the patron saints under whose advocation churches and hermits are).

- Around May 15 (from May 14 to 18, in 2014), Saint Isidore the Laborer, in Andra Mari.
- From June 20 to 23, in Zubilleta
- June 24, Saint John the Baptist
- Near July 16 (from July 11 to 13 in 2014), Our Lady of Mount Carmel, in Neguri Langile.
- July 25 (Saint Jacques' day, a public holyday in the autonomous community of the Basque Country), contest of paellas (a Valencian rice dish) in the fields of Aixerrota.
- From July 25 to 27, Saint Anne, in Santa Ana
- Around July 31 (from July 30 to August 2 in 2014), Saint Ignatius of Loyola, in Algorta
- From August 6 to 10, in Romo / Itzubaltzeta
- From August 12 to 17, in the Old Port of Algorta.
- Around September 24 (19, 20 and 21 in 2014), Our Lady of Mercy, in Areeta / Las Arenas.
- Around November 9, Saint Martin of Tours, in La Humedad, Algorta.

Getxo also has festivals for Christmas season. Several neighbourhoods of Getxo celebrate marches with Olentzaros (in Christmas Eve, December 24). And there is a longer Cavalcade of Magi through Algorta and then Las Arenas on January 5.

== Transport ==
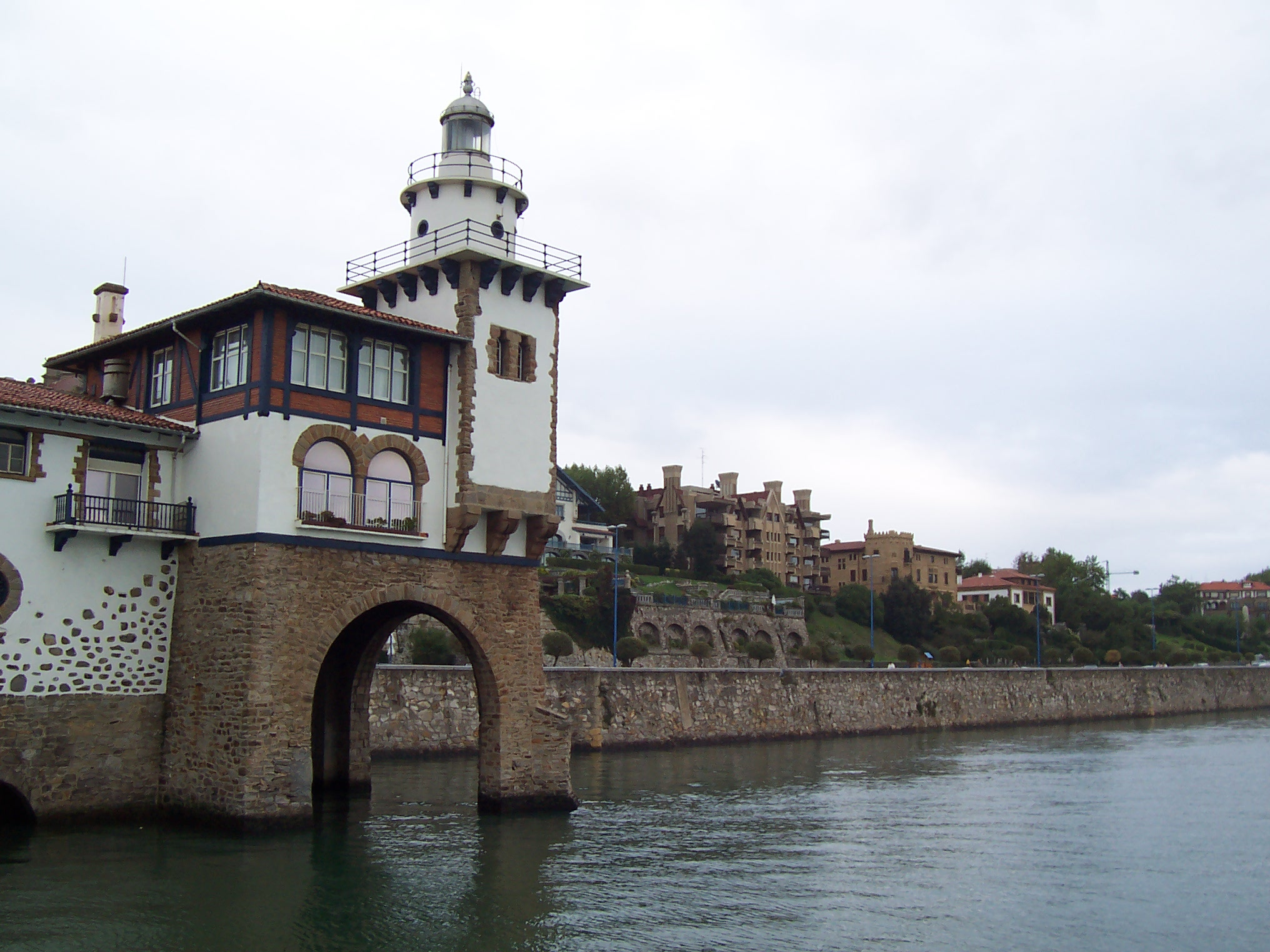
Arriluce lighthouse, Neguri.

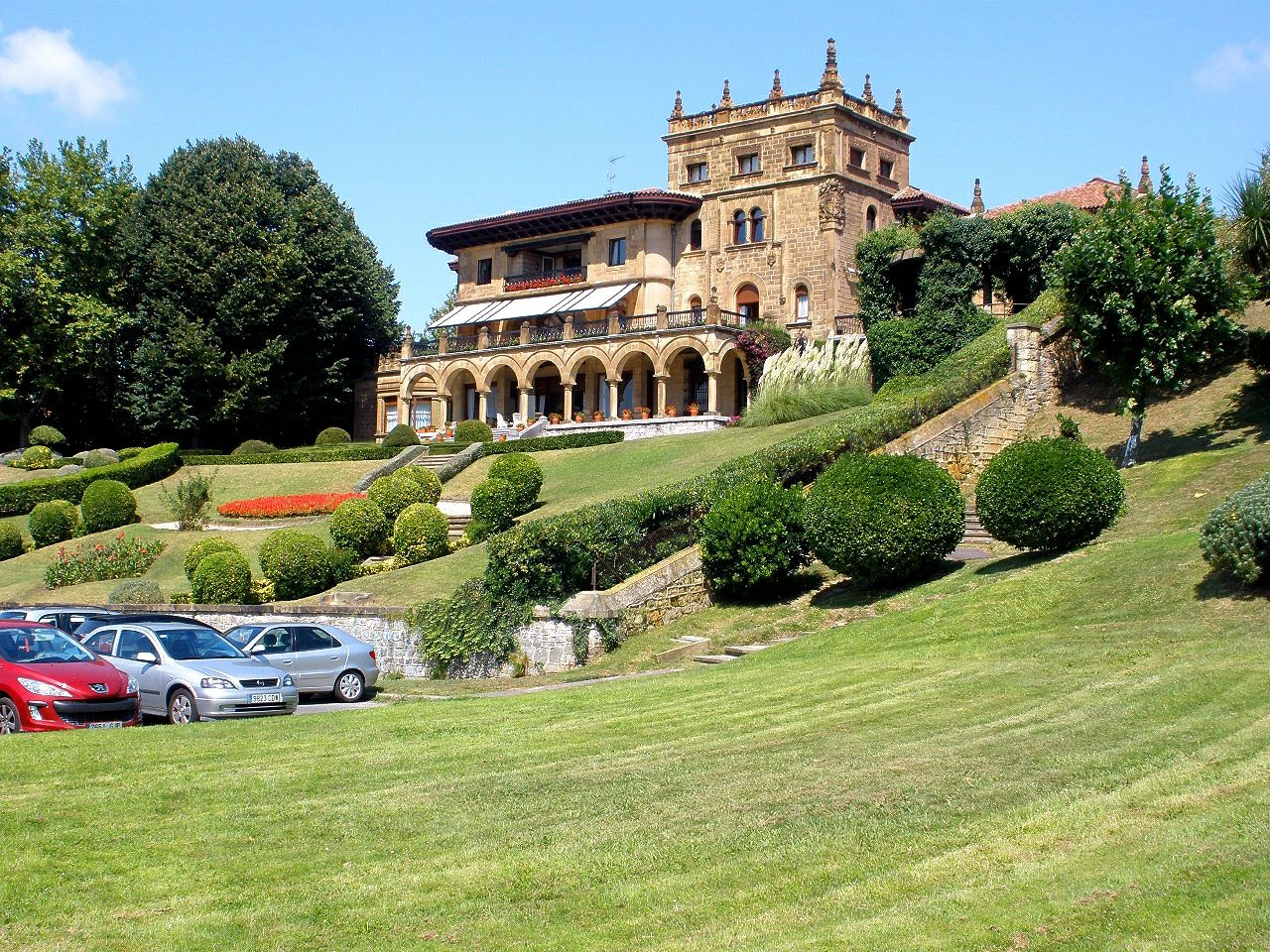
Lezama-Leguizamón's palace in Neguri

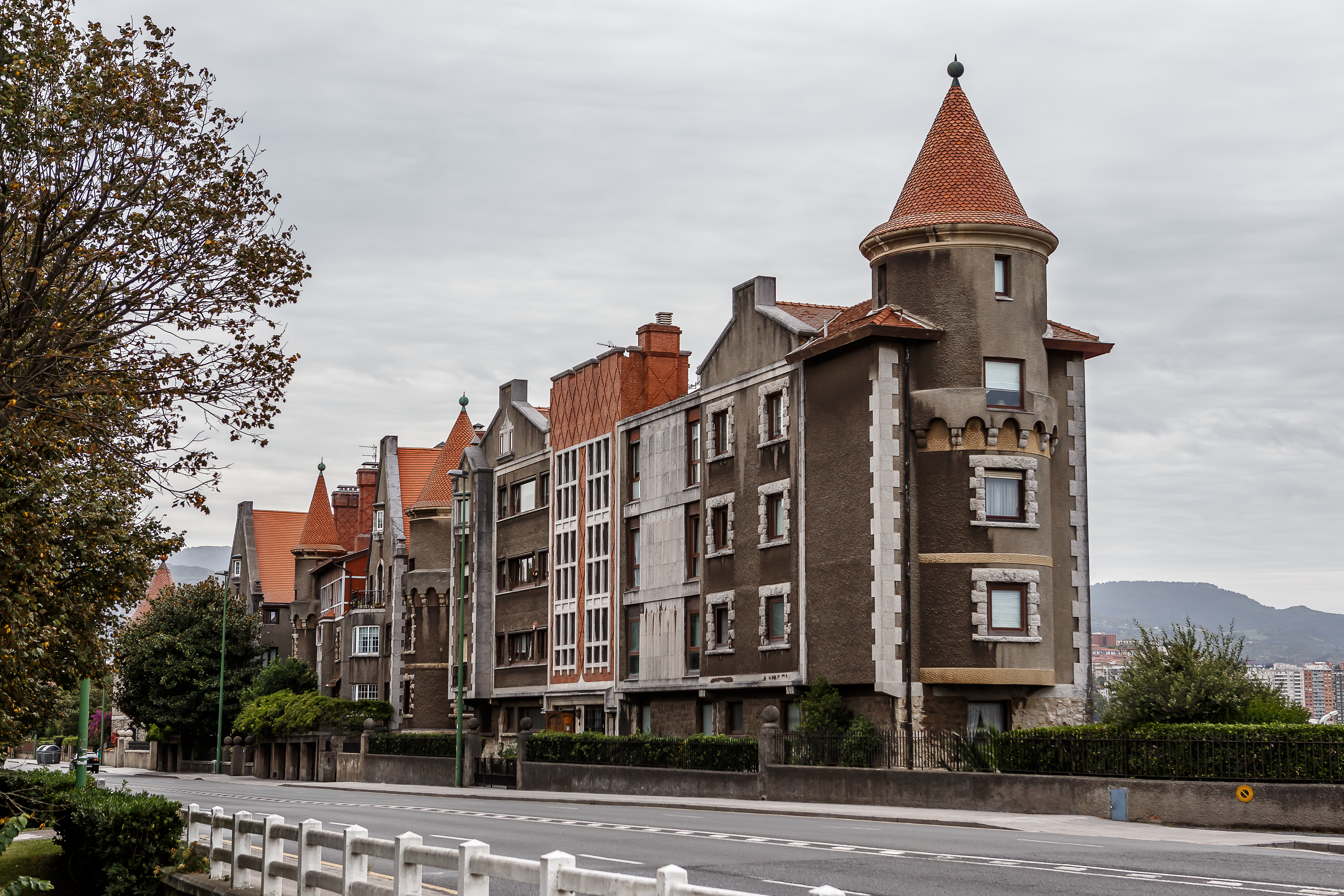
Cisco II House in Las Arenas

It is possible to travel to Getxo from Bilbao using the city's modern underground Bilbao Metro, which has 6 stations along the neighborhoods (Areeta, Gobela, Neguri, Aiboa, Algorta, Bideazabal and Ibarbengoa). Getxo is also accessible from Portugalete, by means of both the Vizcaya Bridge transporter bridge and the regular fluvial transport over the Estuary of Bilbao.

The Bilbao Airport in Loiu is twenty minutes away from Getxo's town centre.

== Sport ==
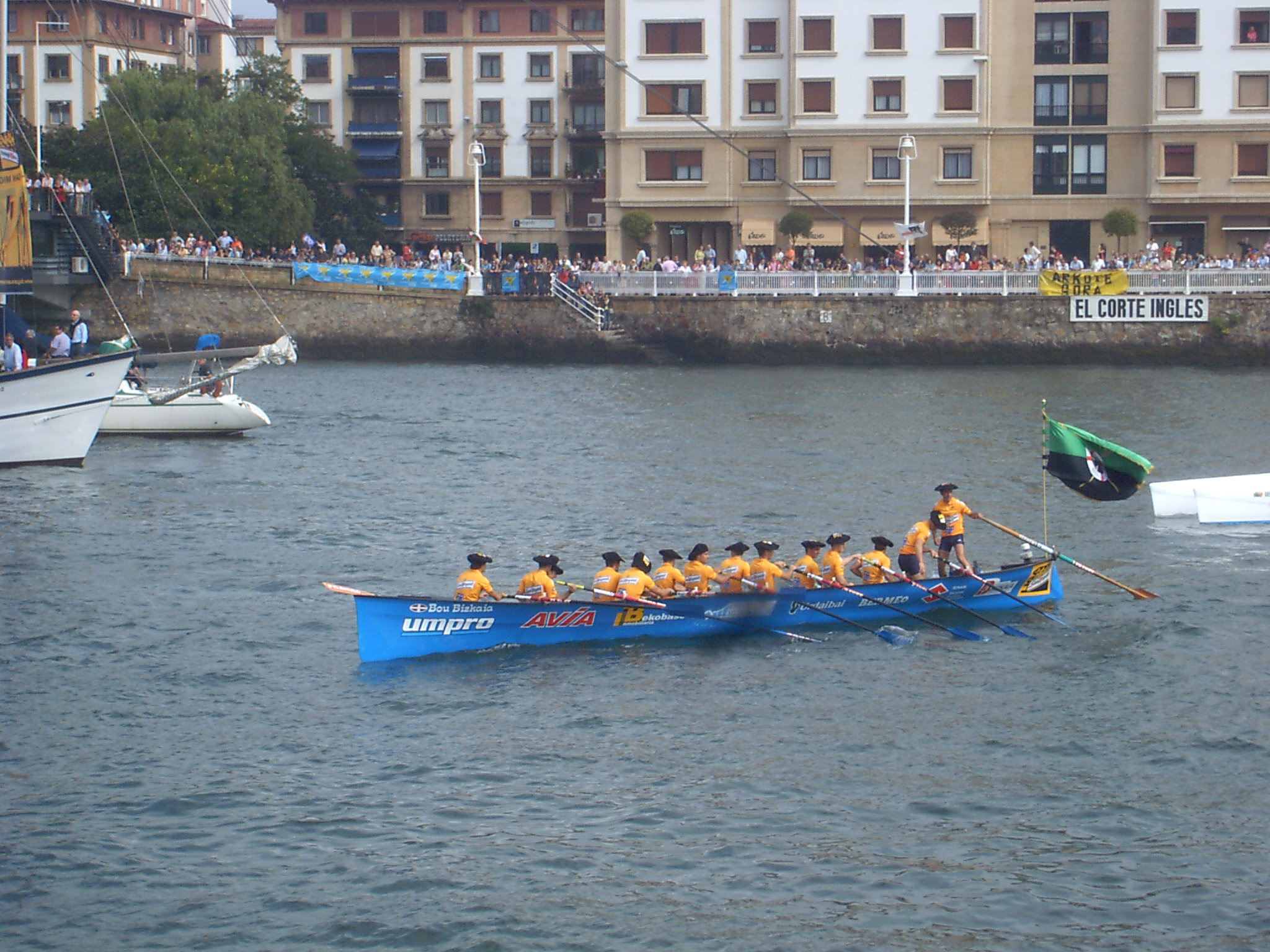
A trainera passes by Las Arenas.

Since 1924, the Circuito de Getxo (Getxo Circuit), a single-day road bicycle race, is held annually in July. Since 2005, the race has been organised as a 1.1 event on the UCI Europe Tour.

Every year one of the rowing clubs of Getxo organises a regatta of traineras called Flag of Getxo. Besides, other annual trainera competitions, like the Flag of Santurtzi, the Flag of Getxo and the Grand Prix of Nervión ara also held partly in waters of Getxo.

There are several association football clubs in Getxo. The most successful is the Arenas Club de Getxo football, which took part in the first ever national Spanish football league season, stood seven seasons in its First Division and won the 1919 Copa del Rey.

Getxo Rugby Taldea is the local rugby team and play in the División de Honor B, former players include a Danish rugby international.

Getxo also has other clubs for golf, Basque traditional sports, Basque pelota, skating, hitch-hiking, cycling, sailing, basketball, surfing, fishing, athletics, triathlon, rhythmic gymnastics, handball, futsal, chess, tennis, paddle tennis, horse riding, hockey, boxing, and other sports.
