= Plentzia (Bilbao Metro) =

Rapid transit station in Plentzia, Basque Country, Spain

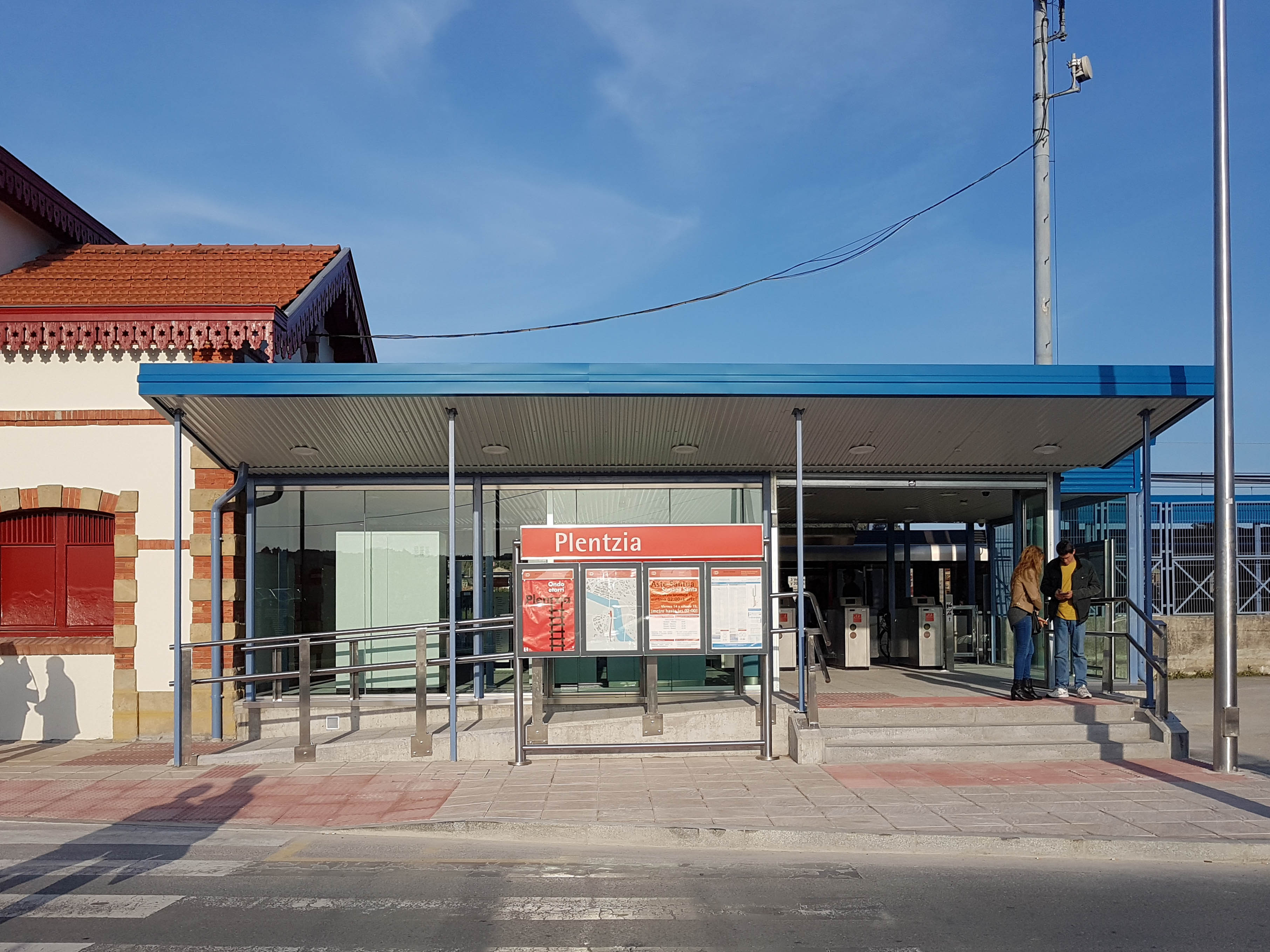
- Entrance to the station

General information
- Location: 2 Geltoki St. 48610 Plentzia; Spain
- Coordinates: 43°24′06″N 2°56′47″W
- Owner: Biscay Transport Consortium; Euskal Trenbide Sarea
- Line: Line 1
- Platforms: 1 island platform, 1 side platform
- Tracks: 3

Construction
- Structure type: At-grade
- Platform levels: 1
- Parking: No
- Accessible: Yes

Other information
- Fare zone: Zone 3

History
- Opened: 15 September 1893
- Rebuilt: 11 November 1995

Passengers
- 2021: 375,726

Services
Preceding station	Metro Bilbao	Following station
Terminus	Line 1	Urduliz towards Etxebarri
Location

Plentzia is the northern terminus of Line 1 of the Bilbao Metro. It is located in the municipality of Plentzia. The station opened as part of the metro network on 11 November 1995, although it had already been serving as a railway station since the 19th century.

== History ==
The railway station of Plentzia, originally named Plencia, was first opened on 15 September 1893 by the Las Arenas-Plencia Railway Company. In Getxo, the line connected with the existing Bilbao-Las Arenas railway. Direct services between Bilbao and Plentzia started in 1901.

Starting in 1947, the narrow-gauge railway companies that operated within the Bilbao metropolitan area were merged to become Ferrocarriles y Transportes Suburbanos, shortened FTS and the first precedent of today's Bilbao Metro. In 1977, the FTS network was transferred to the public company FEVE and in 1982 to the recently created Basque Railways. In the 1980s it was decided the station, just like most of the former railway line, would be integrated into Line 1 of the metro, with the new station opening now as part of the metro network on 11 November 1995.

The station was out of service from 2015 to 2017 due to the rebuilding of Urduliz station. During that time, Plentzia station was renovated as well with a new main entrance added. The station was reopened on 10 April 2017.

== Station layout ==
It is an at-grade station with three tracks and a main hall located to one side. The station maintains the original station building. The station is complemented by a dirt parking area on the other side of the road.

=== Access ===
- 2 Geltoki St.

== Services ==
The station is served by Line 1 to Etxebarri. The station is also served by regional Bizkaibus bus services.
