= Etxebarri (Bilbao Metro) =

Rapid transit station in Etxebarri, Basque Country, Spain

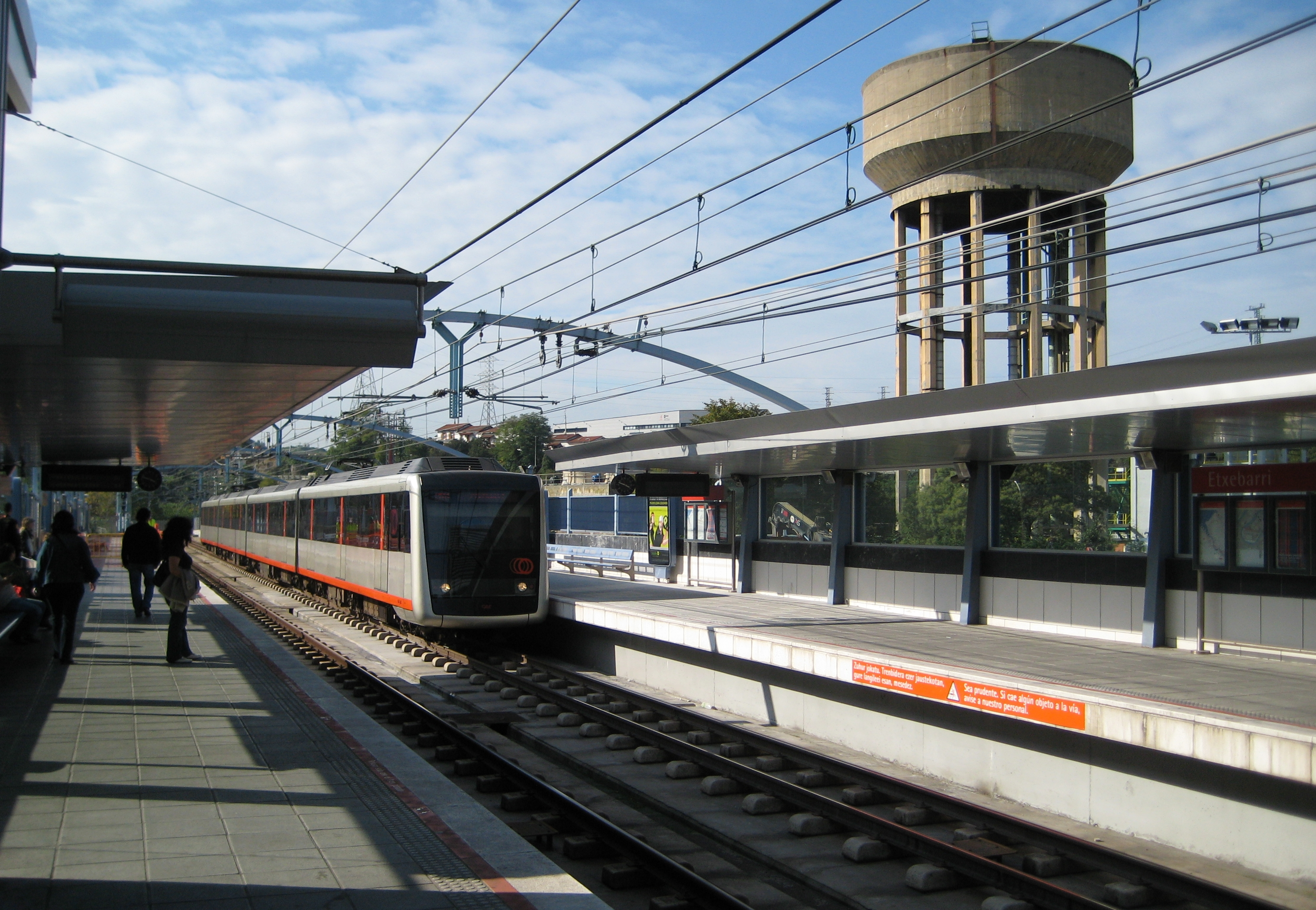
- Metro unit approaching the station

General information
- Location: 2 Fuenlabrada St, Etxebarri; Spain
- Coordinates: 43°14′38″N 2°53′52″W
- Owner: Biscay Transport Consortium; Euskal Trenbide Sarea
- Lines: Line 1; Line 2
- Platforms: 2 side platforms
- Tracks: 2
- Connections: Bus

Construction
- Structure type: At-grade
- Parking: Yes
- Accessible: Yes

Other information
- Fare zone: Zone 2

History
- Opened: 5 January 2005

Passengers
- 2021: 1,017,813

Services
Preceding station	Metro Bilbao	Following station
Bolueta towards Plentzia	Line 1	Terminus
Bolueta towards Kabiezes	Line 2	Ariz towards Basauri
Location

Etxebarri is a station on Lines 1 and 2 of the Bilbao Metro. It is the southern terminus of line 1. The station is located in the municipality of Etxebarri, part of the Bilbao metropolitan area. It was opened in 2005. The station is on Fuenlabrada street, next to a park and ride parking facility.

The Euskotren Trena commuter railway network has a station with the same name at a distance of about 550 metres (600 yd), but the two stations are not connected.

== Services ==
The station is served by the Line 1 to Ibarbengoa and Plentzia, and also by Line 2 from Basauri to Santurtzi.

Connecting bus services are provided by EtxebarriBus, a local bus service managed by the Etxebarri municipality. The metro station is the starting point of the two lines of the system; line 1 connects the station with the neighborhood of Santa Marina, crossing the main urban area of the city, while line 2 links the metro station with the Legizamon area.

=== Future ===
The original project of the line 5 of the metro network was unveiled in 2008, with the final project being presented in 2010. It involved the construction of a new underground line between the towns of Etxebarri and Galdakao, ultimately reaching the Galdakao-Usansolo hospital. This project involved making Etxebarri one of the termini of the new line, where it would connect with the existing two lines of the system. The economic crisis that has since affected the region has delayed the project and altered some aspects of it. In May 2018, the Basque Nationalist Party and the Socialist Party of the Basque Country presented a new proposal which suggested the possibility of taking advantage of the existing overground rail infrastructure between Etxebarri and Galdakao currently managed by Euskotren Trena in place of the original underground project. As of 2018, a final decision has not yet been taken.
