= Basurto-Zorroza =

Coordinates: 43°16′05″N 2°57′56″W

- District
- Basurto-Zorroza district is highlighted in blue in this map of the districts of Bilbao.
- Interactive map of Basurto-Zorroza
- Country: Spain
- Autonomous community: Basque Country
- Province: Biscay
- Comarca: Greater Bilbao
- Municipality: Bilbao

Area
  - Total: 7.09 km^{2} (2.74 sq mi)

Population (2016)
  - Total: 31,672
  - Density: 4,470/km^{2} (11,600/sq mi)

Basurto-Zorroza (or Basurtu-Zorrotza) is the eighth district of the city of Bilbao (Biscay), in the Spanish Basque Country. It is divided into the neighbourhoods of Altamira, Basurto, Olabeaga, Masustegui-Monte Caramelo and Zorrotza. It is separated from Barakaldo by the river Kadagua. Its area is 7.09 square kilometers and has a population of 31,672 inhabitants.

== Places of interest ==
The district is the location of:

- Basurto Hospital
- San Mamés Stadium
- Bilbao Maritime Museum

== Transport ==
The 8th district of Bilbao has a very important role as a transportation hub, the main road access to the city from the A-8 motorway crosses the heart of the district (Av. Sabino Arana). This causes heavy disruption to the residents of the district, a new road access is projected through the less populated areas of Basurto.

All railway companies operating in Bilbao except Euskotren Trena have stations in the 8th district:

- The Bilbao Metro has a station in the district (San Mamés).
- The Bilbao tram has the Basurto, Hospital and San Mamés stations in the district.
- The Cercanías Bilbao commuter railway network has three stops in the district: San Mamés, Olabeaga, and Zorrotza.
- The FEVE commuter line to Balmaseda has two stations in the district, Basurto and Zorrotza.

On top of that, the main bus station of the city (Termibus) is located in Basurto.

== Sights ==
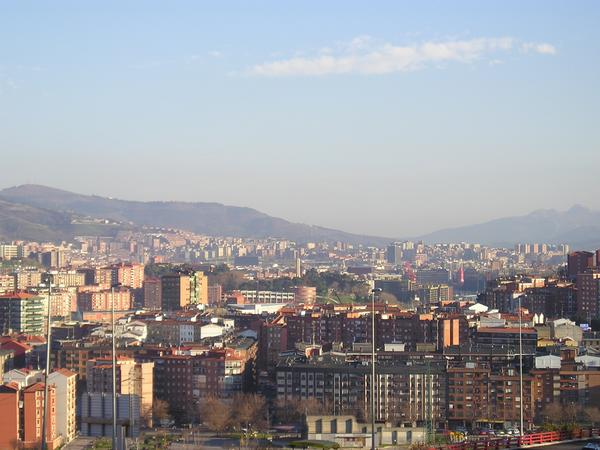
A view of Zorrotza, with Bilbao skyline in the background.
