= San Mamés station =

Interchange station in Bilbao, Basque Country, Spain

San Mamés
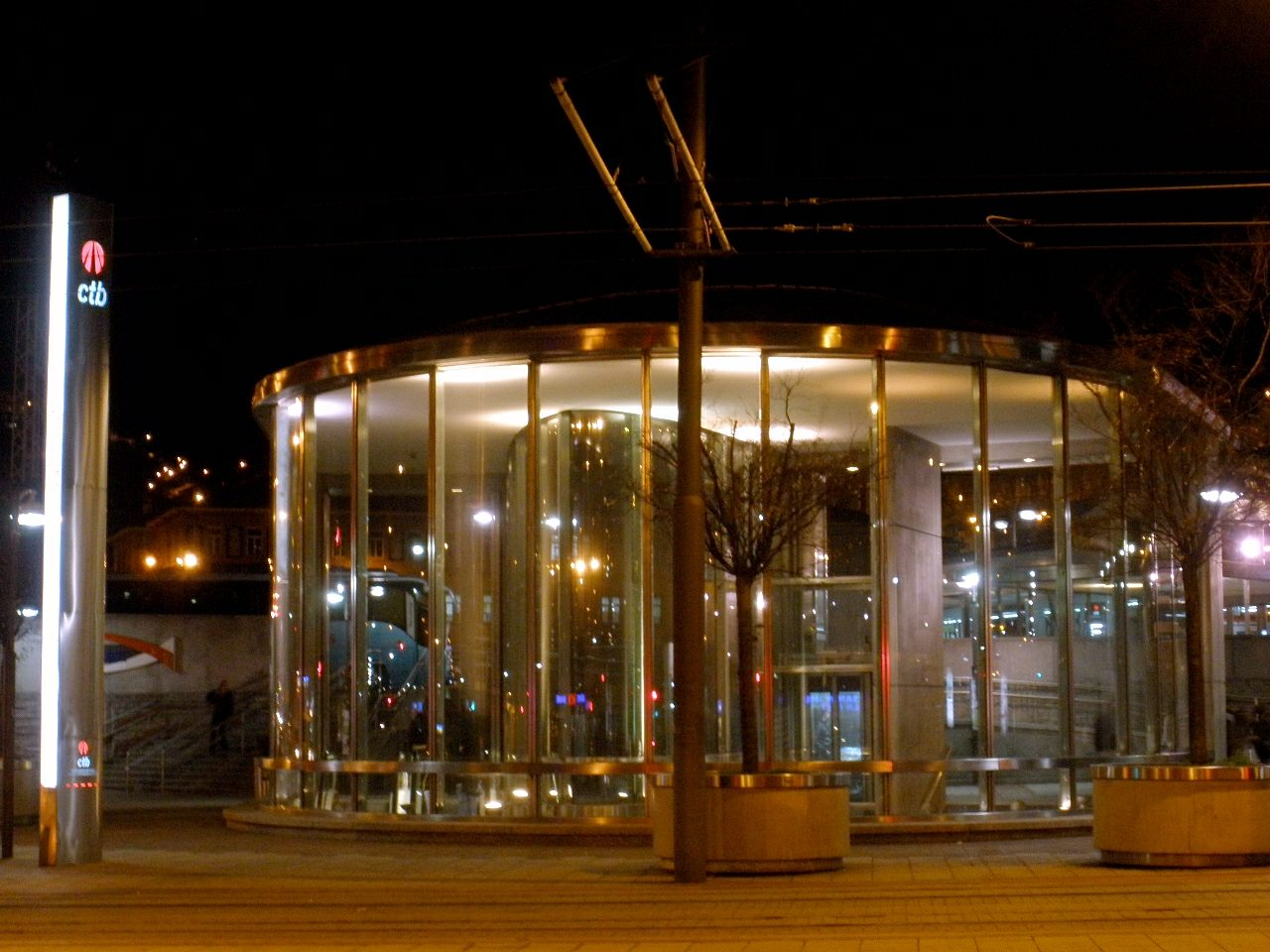
- Station's entrance

General information
- Location: 31 Juan Antonio Zunzunegui; 48013 Bilbao; Spain
- Coordinates: 43°15′42″N 2°56′57″W
- Owner: Biscay Transport Consortium; Euskal Trenbide Sarea; Adif
- Line: Line 1; Line 2; Line C-1; Line C-2; Line C-3; Bilbao tram
- Platforms: 4 side platforms
- Tracks: 4
- Connections: Bilbao Intermodal

Construction
- Structure type: Underground station
- Platform levels: 2
- Parking: Yes
- Accessible: Yes

Other information
- Fare zone: Zone 1

History
- Opened: 11 November 1995

Passengers
- 2021: 4,211,935 (metro)
Location

San Mamés is a transfer station in Bilbao, Basque Country, Spain. It is located in the neighbourhood of Basurto, part of the Basurto-Zorroza district of Bilbao. The station connects the rapid transit network of Bilbao Metro with the Cercanías Bilbao commuter rail services, as well as with the Bilbao tram. It is also directly connected to Bilbao Intermodal, the city's main bus station. The station is also located near San Mamés Stadium, home of Athletic Club Bilbao. Since 2017 to 2026, the metro station was known as Santimami/San Mamés.

== History ==
The station opened as part of Line 1 of the Bilbao Metro on 11 November 1995. The station was below Alameda de Urquijo, between San Mamés Stadium, the Termibus bus station, and Sabino Arana Avenue; the main access to the city from the A-8 motorway. Thus the station had a very high traffic of passengers commuting daily from other parts of the metropolitan area to the bus station, and to the stadium on match days.

In 2000, the San Mamés station of the Cercanías Bilbao commuter rail network (operated by Renfe) opened on a nearby location. The station was built on an existing trench which was put underground. Despite both stations being in close proximity, they were not physically connected. In addition to that, a third stop opened in 2002 as part of the Bilbao tram; it was overground and closer to the bus station.

The interchange station was built in 2004 allowing for an easy connection between the metro and Cercanías stations, which now share a common access and hall, which also connects them directly to the bus station entrance and the tram stop, which was relocated closer to the new station. In 2017 works began for the construction of a new underground bus station, which involved temporarily shutting down the direct connection between the interchange station and the bus terminal. The connection was reopened in November 2019, after the opening of the new Bilbao Intermodal bus station.

== Station layout ==
The station consists in truth of two separate underground stations connected by a common hall. The metro station follows the typical cavern-shaped layout of most underground Metro Bilbao stations designed by Norman Foster, with the main hall located directly above the rail tracks, whereas the Cercanías Bilbao station follows a rectangular design with high ceilings.

=== Access ===
- 17 Sabino Arana Av. (Sabino Arana exit, Metro Bilbao only)
- 23 Luis Briñas St. (Briñas - Termibús - Renfe exit)
- 13 Luis Briñas St. (Briñas exit, Metro Bilbao only)
- Ingeniero Torres Quevedo Plaza (Torres Quevedo exit, Cercanías Bilbao only)

== Services ==
The metro station is served by Line 1 from Etxebarri to Ibarbengoa and Plentzia, and by Line 2 from Basauri to Kabiezes. The Cercanías Bilbao lines that call at this station connect Bilbao with other municipalities across its metropolitan area. There is also a tram stop on the surface, served by Bilbao's single tram line. Additionally, the station is directly connected to the Bilbao Intermodal bus station, with long-distance and regional Bizkaibus bus services.

Preceding station	Metro Bilbao	Following station
Deustu towards Plentzia	Line 1	Indautxu towards Etxebarri
Deustu towards Kabiezes	Line 2	Indautxu towards Basauri
Preceding station	Cercanías Bilbao	Following station
Olabeaga towards Santurtzi	Line C-1	Autonomía towards Abando
Olabeaga towards Muskiz	Line C-2	Autonomía towards Abando
Preceding station	Euskotren Tranbia	Following station
Ospitalea/Hospital towards La Casilla	Bilbao tram	Sabino Arana towards Bolueta
