= Santurtzi (Bilbao Metro) =

Rapid transit station in Santurtzi, Basque Country, Spain

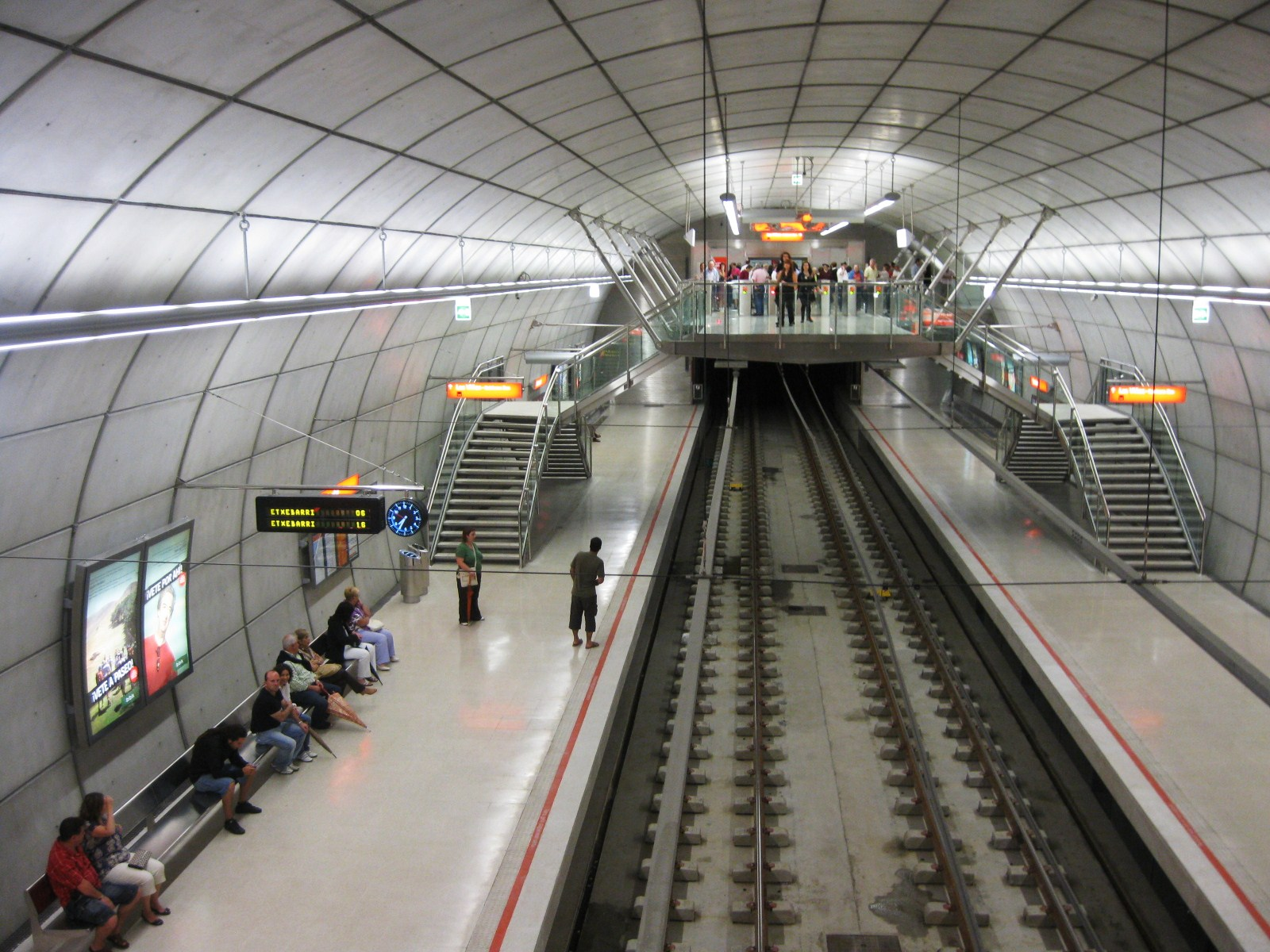
- View of the platforms

General information
- Location: Gernika Park, Santurtzi; Spain
- Coordinates: 43°19′43″N 3°02′05″W
- Owner: Biscay Transport Consortium; Euskal Trenbide Sarea
- Line: Line 2
- Platforms: 2 side platforms
- Tracks: 2

Construction
- Structure type: Underground
- Platform levels: 1
- Parking: No
- Accessible: Yes

Other information
- Fare zone: Zone 2

History
- Opened: 4 July 2009

Passengers
- 2021: 1,879,631

Services
Preceding station	Metro Bilbao	Following station
Kabiezes Terminus	Line 2	Peñota towards Basauri
Location

Santurtzi is a station on Line 2 of the Bilbao Metro. It is located in the municipality of Santurtzi. It opened, together with the neighboring Peñota station, on 4 July 2009.

There is a station on the Cercanías Bilbao commuter railway network with the same name, but the two stations are not connected.

== Station layout ==
Santurtzi station follows the typical cavern-shaped layout of most underground Metro Bilbao stations designed by Norman Foster, with the main hall located directly above the rail tracks.

=== Access ===
- Vapor Habana St. (Casa Torre Jauregia exit)
- Las Viñas St. (Las Viñas exit, closed during night time services)
- Virgen del Mar Plaza (Mamariga exit)
- Gernika Park (Casa Torre Jauregia exit)
- Virgen del Mar Plaza (Mamariga exit)

==== Marmariga funicular ====
Access to the neighborhood of Mamariga from the station wasn't included in the original planning for Line 2. Construction on a funicular connecting the station to Mamariga started in late 2007. The funicular opened in September 2010, more than a year after the station itself. In June 2015, the funicular's Mamariga terminus was severely damaged by a fire, forcing it to close for repairs. The funicular reopened in December that year after repairs were carried out.

The funicular's terminus in Mamariga is considered one of the station's entrances, not a distinct station in and of itself. Since 2013, no fare has been charged for using the funicular. The operating hours of the funicular are the same as those of the metro. On the funicular, trains depart approximately every 3 minutes. In its 353 m (0.219 mi) length, the funicular ascends 42 m (138 ft). The line is double-tracked, with each track being operated independently of the other.

== Services ==
The station is served by Line 2 from Kabiezes to Basauri with headways from five to ten minutes. Bus stops near the station are served by Bizkaibus regional services.
