= Deustu (Bilbao Metro) =

Rapid transit station in Bilbao, Basque Country, Spain

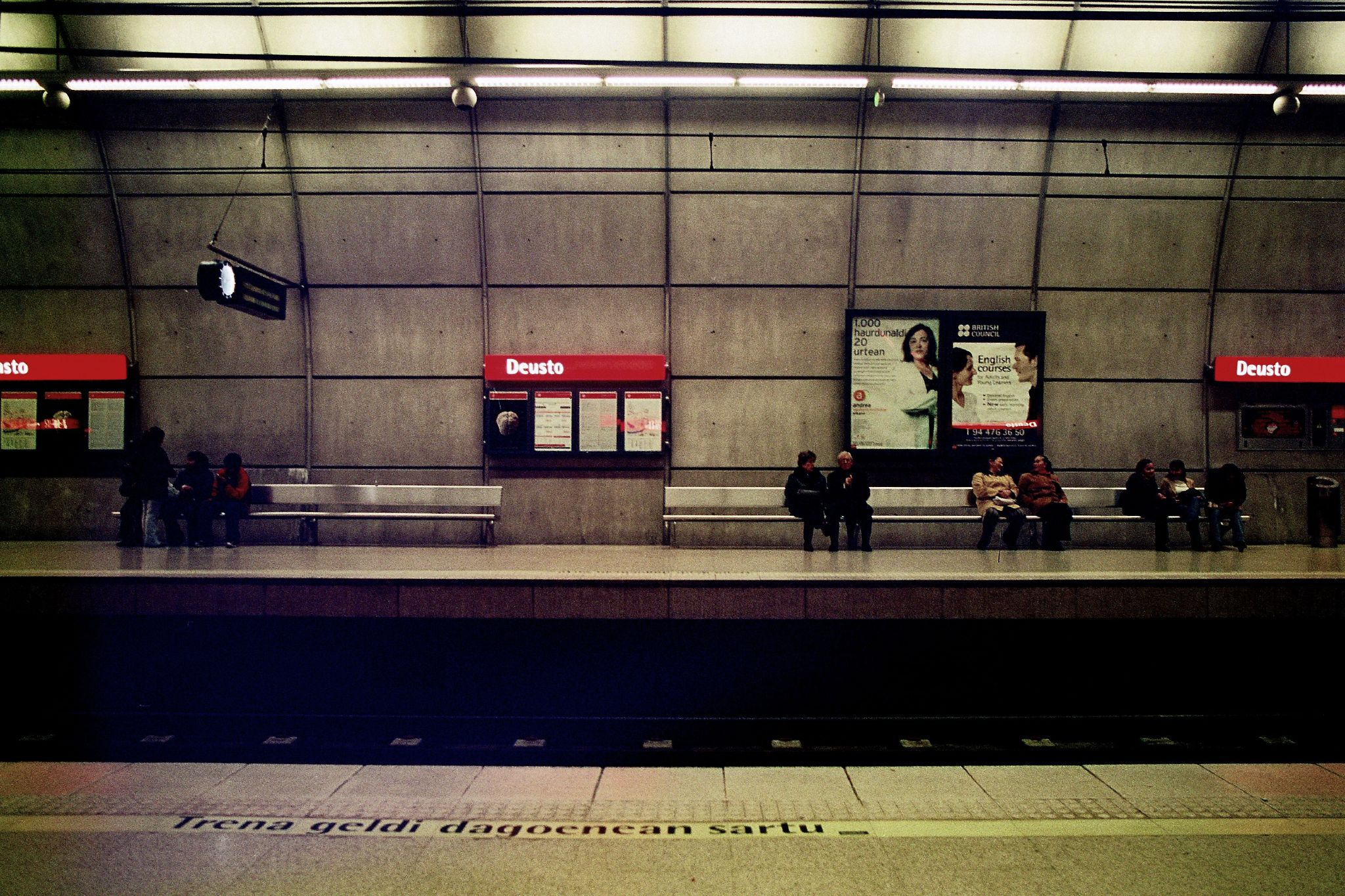
- View of the platforms

General information
- Location: 12 Iruña St. 48014 Bilbao; Spain
- Coordinates: 43°16′18″N 2°56′58″W
- Owner: Biscay Transport Consortium; Euskal Trenbide Sarea
- Line: Line 1; Line 2
- Platforms: 2 side platforms
- Tracks: 2

Construction
- Structure type: Underground
- Platform levels: 1
- Parking: No
- Accessible: Yes

Other information
- Fare zone: Zone 1

History
- Opened: 11 November 1995

Passengers
- 2021: 3,133,326

Services
Preceding station	Metro Bilbao	Following station
Sarriko towards Plentzia	Line 1	San Mamés towards Etxebarri
Sarriko towards Kabiezes	Line 2	San Mamés towards Basauri
Location

Deustu (until 2017, Deusto) is a station on Lines 1 and 2 of the Bilbao Metro. The station is located in the neighbourhood and district of the same name. It is located close to the Bidarte mall and Bilbao's Escuela Oficial de Idiomas (Official Language School). It opened on 11 November 1995.

== Station layout ==
Deustu station follows the typical cavern-shaped layout of most underground Metro Bilbao stations designed by Norman Foster, with the main hall located directly above the rail tracks.

=== Access ===
- 29 Lehendakari Agirre St. (Lehendakari Aguirre exit)
- 10 Iruña St. (Iruña exit, closed during night time services)
- 12 Iruña St. (Lehendakari Aguirre exit)

== Services ==
The station is served by Line 1 from Etxebarri to Ibarbengoa and Plentzia, and by Line 2 from Basauri to Kabiezes.
