= Aiboa (Bilbao Metro) =

Rapid transit station in Getxo, Basque Country, Spain

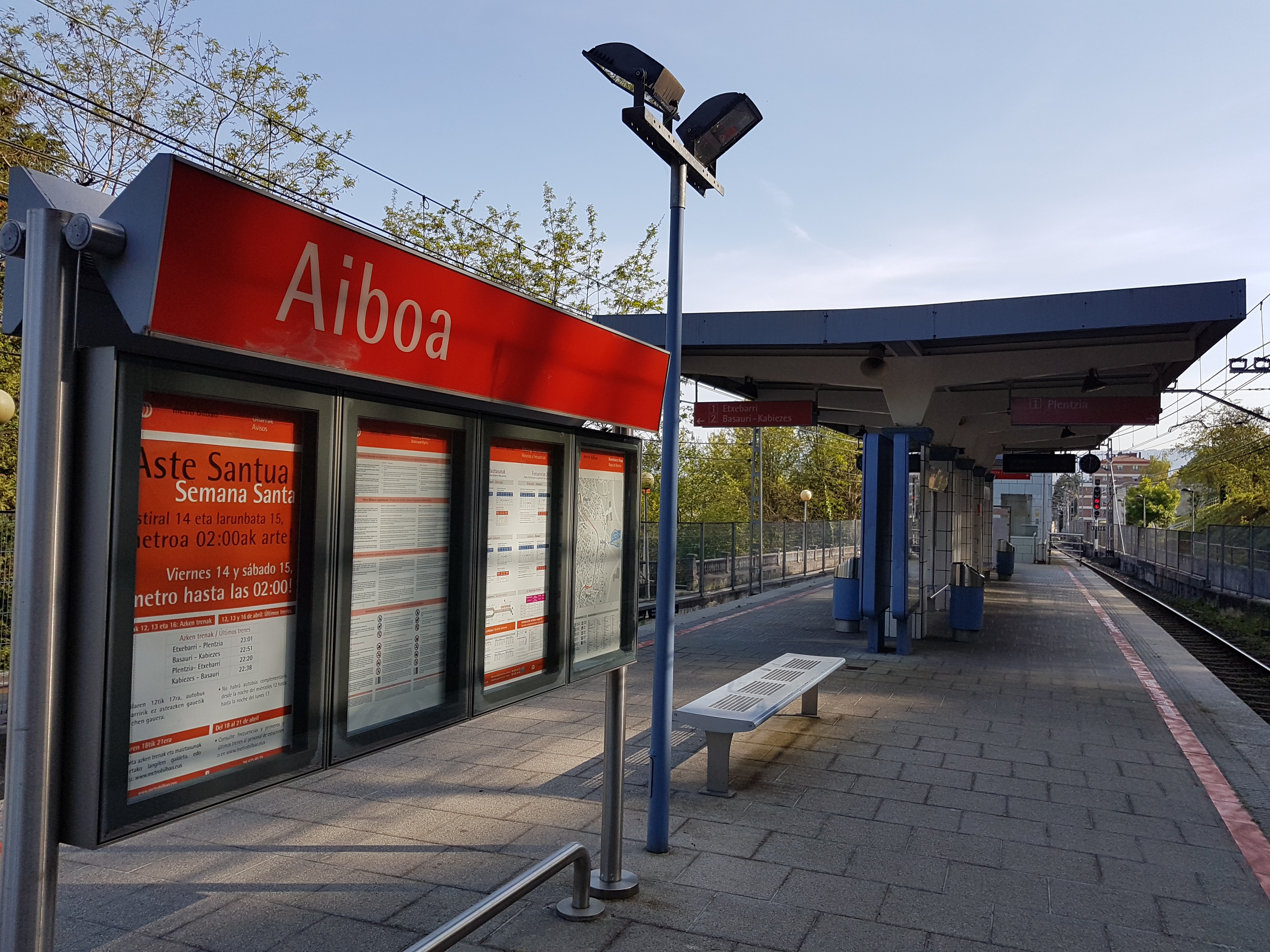
- View of the platform

General information
- Location: 19 Txakursolo St. 48992 Getxo; Spain
- Coordinates: 43°20′38″N 3°00′10″W
- Owner: Biscay Transport Consortium; Euskal Trenbide Sarea
- Line: Line 1
- Platforms: 2 side platforms
- Tracks: 2

Construction
- Structure type: At-grade
- Platform levels: 1
- Parking: No
- Accessible: Yes

Other information
- Fare zone: Zone 2

History
- Opened: 11 November 1995

Passengers
- 2021: 333,349

Services
Preceding station	Metro Bilbao	Following station
Algorta towards Plentzia	Line 1	Neguri towards Etxebarri
Location

Aiboa is a station on Line 1 of the Bilbao Metro. It is located in the neighborhood of Aiboa, in the municipality of Getxo. The station opened on 11 November 1995.

== Station layout ==
It is an at-grade, open-air station with one island platform.

=== Access ===
- 19 Txakursolo St.
- 17 Txakursolo St.
- Station's interior

== Services ==
The station is served by Line 1 from Etxebarri to Plentzia.
