= Bilbao tram =

Tram system in the Basque Country, Spain

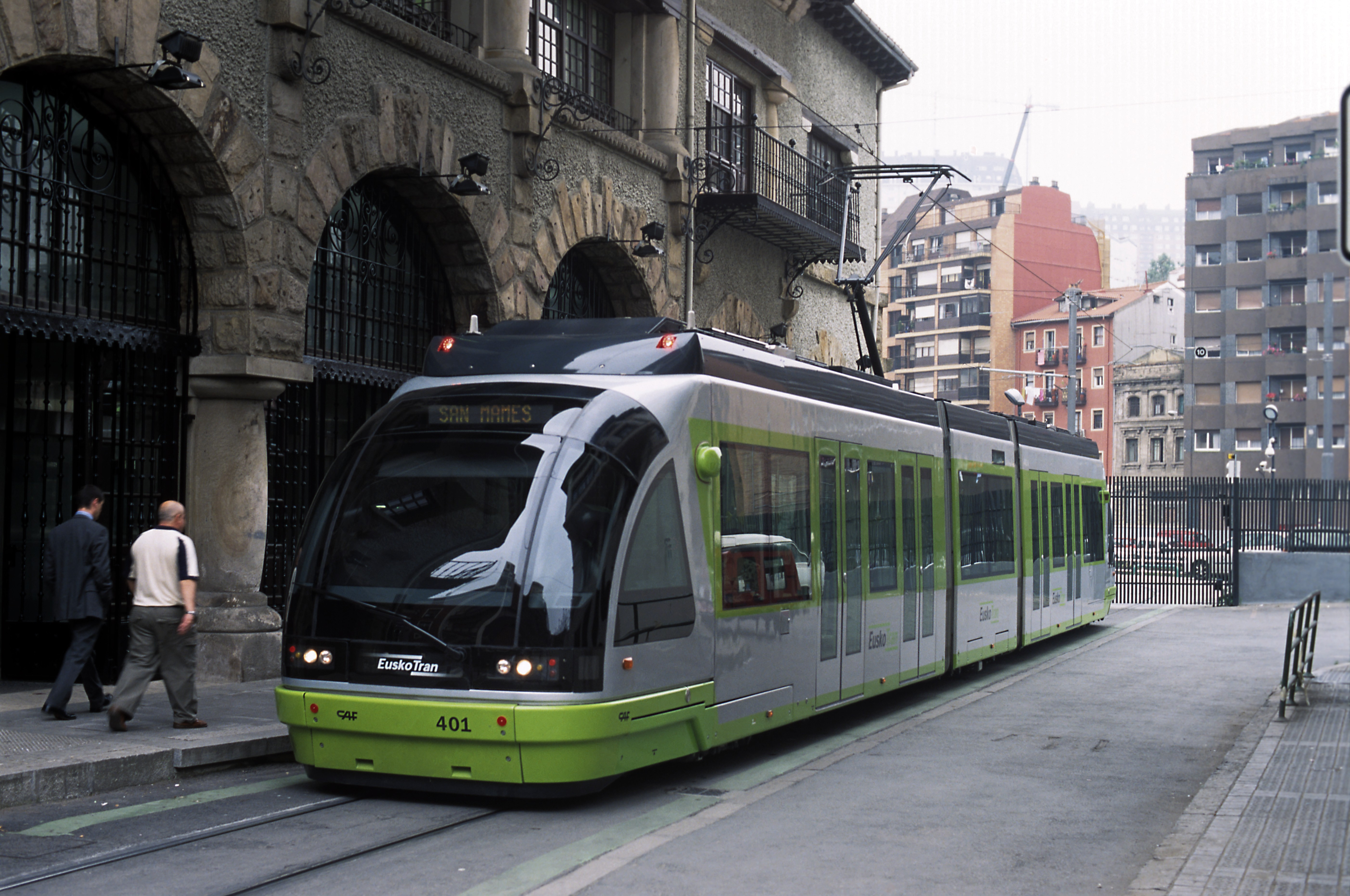
- A CAF Urbos 1 tram at Atxuri

Overview
- Owner: Euskal Trenbide Sarea
- Locale: Bilbao, Spain
- Transit type: Tram
- Number of lines: 1
- Number of stations: 16
- Annual ridership: 2.99 million (2018)
- Website: www.euskotren.eus/en/tranvia/bilbao

Operation
- Began operation: 18 December 2002
- Operator: Euskotren
- Rolling stock: 8 Euskotren 400 series (CAF Urbos 1); 3 Euskotren 500 series (CAF Urbos 2)
- Number of vehicles: 11

Technical
- System length: 7.8 km (4.8 mi)
- Track gauge: 1,000 mm (3 ft 3 3/8 in) metre gauge
- Electrification: 750 V DC overhead catenary
- Top speed: 50 km/h (31 mph)
System map

The Bilbao tram (Basque: Bilboko tranbia, Spanish: Tranvía de Bilbao) is a tram system in Bilbao, Basque Country, Spain. Operated by Euskotren under the brand Euskotren Tranbia (which also manages the tram system in Vitoria-Gasteiz), it comprises a single 7.8 km (4.8 mi) line, inaugurated on 18 December 2002 and last extended on 25 March 2022.

The factor leading its creation was to improve Bilbao's railway network; the tram serves neighbourhoods that do not have metro or Cercanías stations. Also, the line goes through important tourist and cultural spots, like the Guggenheim Museum Bilbao. It offers connections with the Bilbao Metro, Euskotren Trena and Cercanías Bilbao.

== History ==
The EuskoTran brand (currently known as Euskotren Tranbia) was conceived in order to improve the railway services in Bilbao, and to serve neighborhoods and areas unattended by the Bilbao Metro or Cercanías Bilbao. It took 15 years of studies and research to contemplate the need of a tram in the city.

The construction of the first phase of the line started in May 1999. The first six stops were opened on 18 December 2002 by Juan José Ibarretxe, lehendakari of the Basque Country at the time. Between 2003 and 2004 four new stops were opened.

In 2008 a proposal was made to expand the line with three more stops. The construction of two of the three stops (the last one being ultimately discarded) started in 2010. The two stops (called Basurto and La Casilla) were inaugurated on 25 April 2012.

On 25 March 2022, the line was extended from Atxuri to Bolueta using the former Euskotren Trena alignment between Kukullaga and Atxuri; disused since 2019 when all train services where rerouted through Line 3 of the metro.

== System ==
=== Station design ===
The whole line has sixteen stations (as of March 2022). The tram stops have low platforms, and in some stations regular sidewalks are used instead. With the exception of Bilbao-Atxuri station, all stops and stations are un-staffed and have automated ticket machines for ticket sales. Once bought, the ticket must be validated on the validation machine located next to the ticket machine. The floors of the stations are virtually level with those of the trams, so this allows wheelchairs, prams, pushchairs and the elderly to board the tram easily with no steps.

=== Lines ===
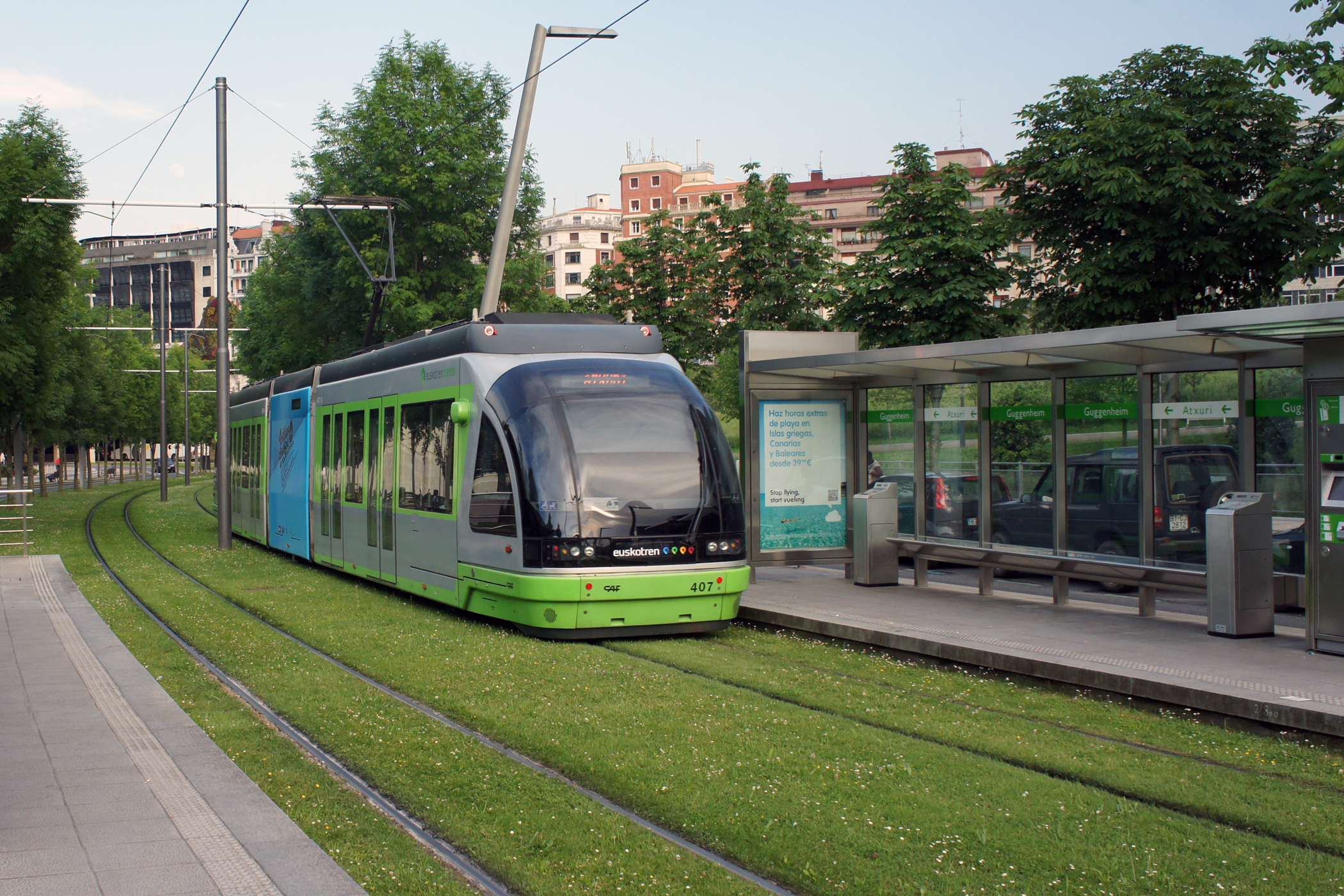
A tram at Guggenheim.

The network comprises a single line, formerly called Line A, running from Atxuri to in La Casilla. On weekdays, the first departure from Atxuri is at 5:58 and from La Casilla at 6:26. Trams run every 10 minutes during most of the day, and less frequently early in the morning and late in the night. The last departure from Atxuri is at 22:58 and from La Casilla at 23:26. Weekend service has longer headways and shorter hours of operation.

The first part of the line, from Atxuri to Pío Baroja and again from Sabino Arana to La Casilla runs on the street (albeit on a dedicated lane). From Pío Baroja to Euskalduna, the tram goes through green track.

==== Stop list ====
| Station | Location | Connections | Opening date |
|---|---|---|---|
| Bolueta | | Line 1; Line 2 | 25 March 2022 |
| Abusu | | | 25 March 2022 |
| Atxuri | 43°15′13″N 2°55′18″W | | 18 December 2002 |
| Ribera | 43°15′21″N 2°55′28″W | | 18 December 2002 |
| Arriaga | 43°15′33″N 2°55′33″W | Line 1; Line 2; Line 3; Line E1; Line E3; Line E4 | 18 December 2002 |
| Abando | 43°15′39″N 2°55′36″W | Line 1; Line 2; (Bilbao-Abando and Bilbao-Concordia); (Bilbao-Abando and Bilbao-Concordia) | 18 December 2002 |
| Pío Baroja | 43°15′52″N 2°55′34″W | | 18 December 2002 |
| Uribitarte | 43°15′59″N 2°55′44″W | | 18 December 2002 |
| Guggenheim | 43°16′07″N 2°56′12″W | | 30 April 2003 |
| Abandoibarra | 43°16′07″N 2°56′26″W | | 24 July 2003 |
| Euskalduna | 43°15′59″N 2°56′38″W | | 24 July 2003 |
| Sabino Arana | 43°15′47″N 2°56′47″W | Line 1; Line 2 | 24 July 2003 |
| San Mamés | 43°15′42″N 2°56′57″W | Line 1; Line 2; Cercanías; Bilbao Intermodal | 24 July 2003 |
| Ospitalea/Hospital | 43°15′35″N 2°57′05″W | Cercanías | 22 July 2004 |
| Basurto | 43°15′29″N 2°56′57″W | | 25 April 2012 |
| La Casilla | 43°15′28″N 2°56′40″W | | 25 April 2012 |

== Future developments ==
=== Autonomía ===
Euskotren projected the extension of the line from its former terminus, Ospitalea/Hospital (called Basurto at the time), to Autonomía avenue and the Errekalde district, but after the 2009 election the project was modified. Construction of two more stops started in 2010, one in Autonomía and the second one in La Casilla Square (replacing the one in Errekalde). This extension opened in 2012. There are plans to extend the line from there to Abando, thus creating a circular line with a branch.

=== Etxebarri ===
The original terminus of the tramway line is Atxuri. This station also served as the terminus for Euskotren's commuter rail lines until 2019, when the last remaining services started running through the third metro line. This has freed the former railway line between Atxuri and Kukullaga, which will be used by the tram. The works to convert the line to tramway standard started in 2020, which will include the construction of a new stop serving La Peña and the adaptation of the existing Bolueta station. This extension won't reach Kukullaga until 2025, because a temporary depot for Line 3 is being built on the tracks around that station.

=== Zorrotzaurre ===
With the redevelopment of Zorrotzaurre, there are plans to connect the existing line with the neighborhoods of Zorrotza and Zorrotzaurre.
