= Bilbao Intermodal =

Bus station in Spain

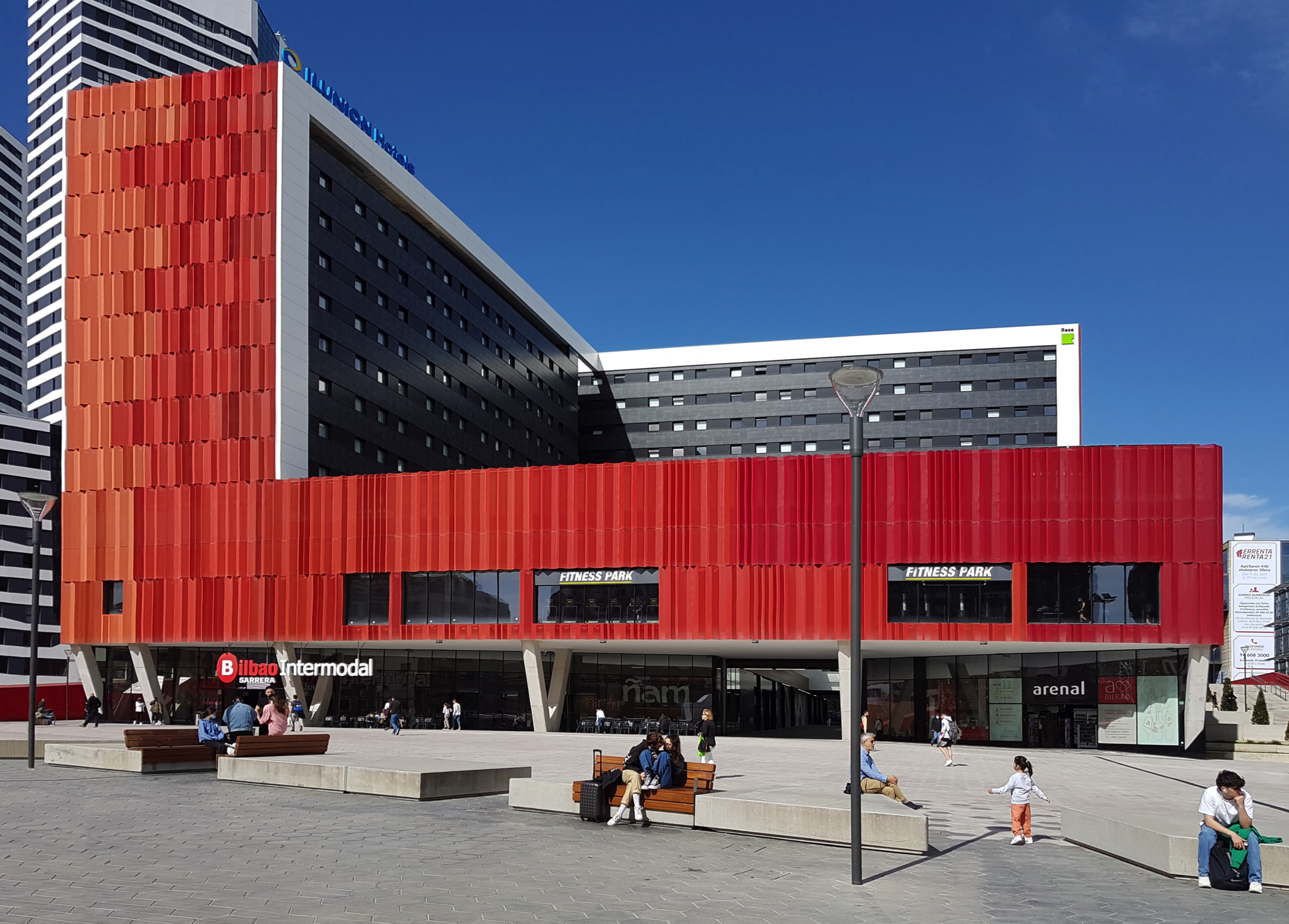

General information
- Location: Bilbao; Spain
- Coordinates: 43°15′40″N 2°56′59″W
- System: Bus station
- Lines: BizkaiBus; Bilbobus; Encartaciones; Continental Auto; Alsa; Pesa; Autobuses La Union; Bilman Bus; Unionbus; Vibasa; La Union Alavesa; Atlassib

Other information
- Website: Bilbao Intermodal
Location

Bilbao Intermodal, previously known as Termibus, is the main bus station of Bilbao (Basque Country, Spain) and it is located beside San Mamés Stadium. The bus terminal is linked to the San Mamés metro, tram and commuter rail station.

Termibus is the starting point of the BizkaiBus A3247 bus line to the Bilbao Airport.

== History ==
The station was built in the mid-1990s as a provisional one in the former site of a football field, in response to the high traffic congestion caused by construction works and to concentrate in one point the many private bus stations scattered throughout the city. As years passed, the number of passengers and bus companies grew, and the location of Termibus proved to be a very strategic one, so the station was greatly improved.

The initial plan was always to build the bus terminal in the Bilbao-Abando station, the main railway station of the city.

Finally, it was decided to build a new underground station in the original location, being reopened on November 27, 2019. Its new official name became Bilbao Intermodal.

== Services ==
The local bus services are provided by BizkaiBus and Bilbobus. There are national and international lines, to places like San Sebastián, Vitoria-Gasteiz, Pamplona, Santander, Oviedo, Madrid, Barcelona, Vigo, Paris or Brussels.
