= Bilbao-Abando railway station =

Railway station in Bilbao, Spain

Bilbao-Abando Indalecio Prieto
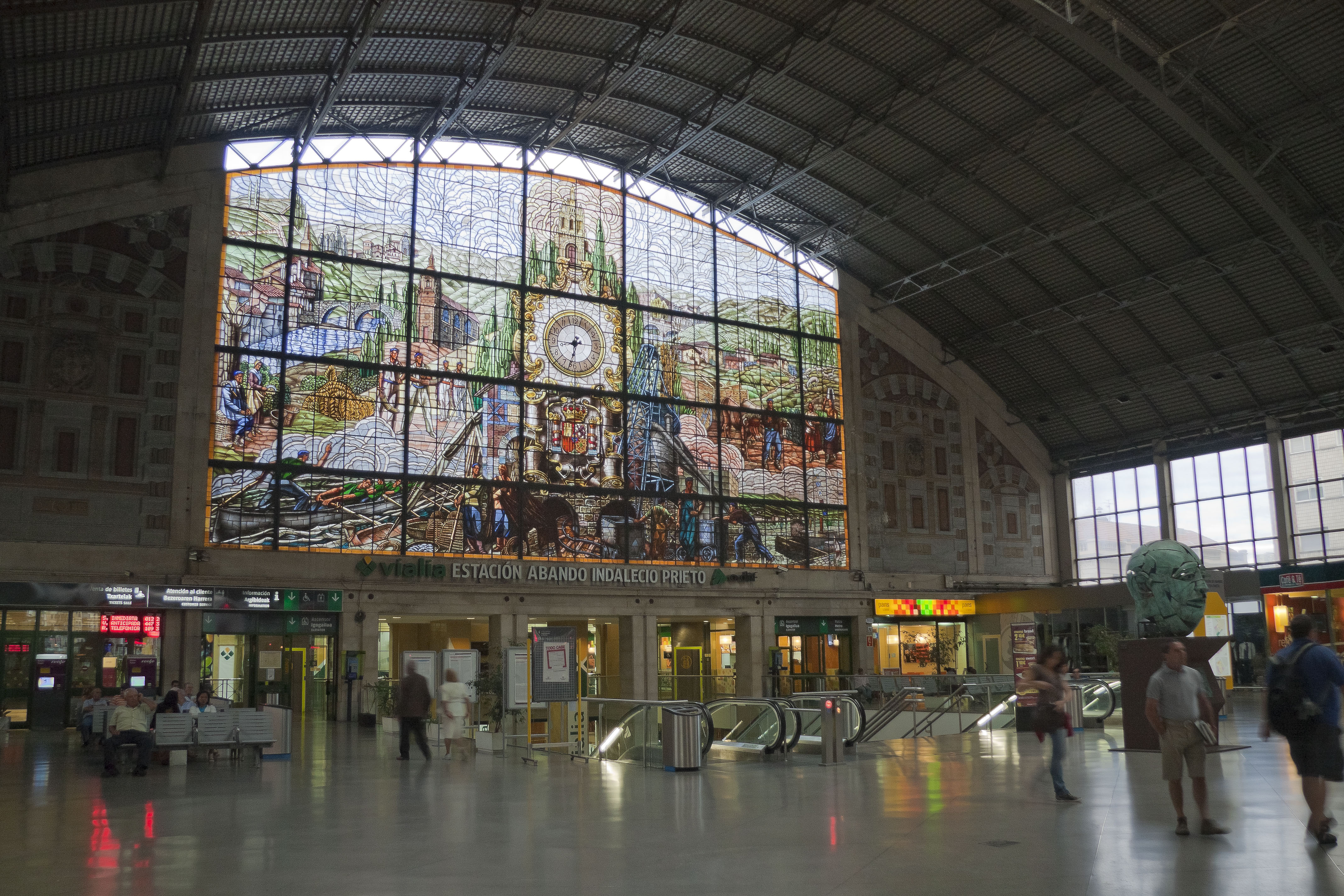
- Stained glass at the station's upper hall

General information
- Location: 1, Gran Vía; 48001 Bilbao; Spain
- Coordinates: 43°15′41″N 2°55′40″W
- System: Terminal station
- Owner: Adif
- Lines: long-distance services
- Platforms: 2 side platforms (main lines); 3 island platform and 1 side platform (Cercanías)
- Tracks: 8
- Connections: Line 1; Line 2; Bilbao tram; Bilbobus

Construction
- Structure type: At-grade station
- Platform levels: 1
- Parking: Yes
- Accessible: yes

History
- Opened: 1870
- Rebuilt: 1948

Passengers
- 2018: 6,494,565
- Rank: 31
Location

The Abando Indalecio Prieto railway station (Basque: Abandoko Indalecio Prieto geltokia, Spanish: Estación de Abando Indalecio Prieto), usually known simply as Bilbao-Abando and previously known as Estación del Norte (North Station) is a terminal railway station in Bilbao, Basque Country (Spain). The name comes from Abando, the district in which the station is located, and Indalecio Prieto, who was Minister of Public Works during the Second Spanish Republic. The station serves as the terminus station for several long and medium distance services operated by Renfe as well as commuter rail services within the Bilbao metropolitan area operated by Cercanías. The station has direct access to the Bilbao Metro and to the tram, as well as many local and regional bus lines. The railway station Bilbao-Concordia, also operated by Renfe, is located in close proximity. After the construction of the high-speed line Basque Y is finished, Bilbao-Abando will serve as the western terminus, which will involve the creation of a completely new station replacing the current one.

== History ==
The first station was opened on 1 March 1863 with the opening of the Bilbao-Orduña railway line; at that time Abando was still an independent municipality and not part of Bilbao. That first line was intended to continue south to connect Bilbao with Castile after a railway junction in Miranda de Ebro, and it was eventually expanded to reach Castejón, near the city of Tudela. The company commissioned with the works of the new line was called Company of the Railway from Tudela to Bilbao, led by Charles Blacker Vignoles, who gave it a clear English style. In 1865 the company filed for bankruptcy and was intervened by the Bank of Bilbao In 1878 it was transferred to the Company of the Railways of Northern Spain, company that owned the line and stations until the nationalisation of the Spanish railways in 1941, when it was integrated into Renfe and renamed Bilbao Abando station.

Due to the poor situation of the station's building, Renfe commissioned the construction of a new station on its place, which finally opened in 1948. The station was affected by the 1983 floodings of Bilbao, after which it was partially renovated with the addition of escalators and sculptures by Agustín Ibarrola. The building underwent several modifications and renovations in the following years, including the opening of a shopping mall and the creation of two extra rail tracks after the integration of the Cercanías Bilbao commuter-rail services, which until then had the closed Bilbao-La Naja station as their terminus.

In 2006 the station was renamed Abando Indalecio Prieto station, after Indalecio Prieto, who was Minister of Public Works during the Second Spanish Republic. The renaming caused controversy, although the change was not reflected on the service maps and the service announcement systems of the trains, which still use Bilbao-Abando. In 2010 it was announced that the station would become the northwestern terminus of the Basque Y high-speed line and as such would need to go through extensive renovation works. In 2018 the Ministry of Development and the city hall of Bilbao jointly announced the project for the new Bilbao-Abando station, which would involve the construction of a completely new station with three underground levels, one for the high speed trains, another for the regional and Cercanías trains and a main hall. The station will be connected to a new bus station with 13 platforms as well as the existing metro station. The constructions works are expected to begin in 2020 and cost 730 million Euro, with railway services starting in 2023. The entire urbanisation project including infrastructure and housing could be finished around 2030.

== Station layout ==
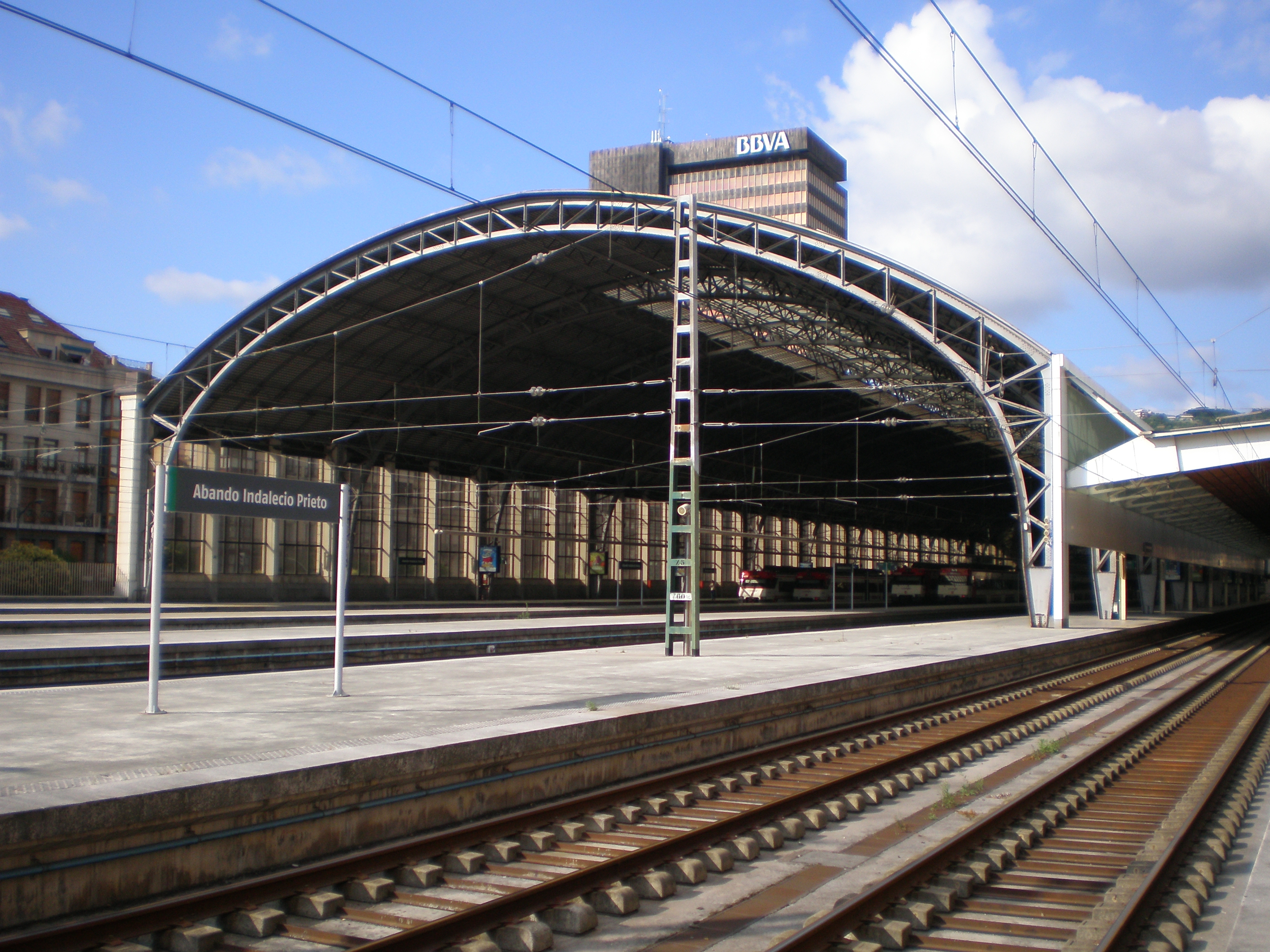
Upper level, platforms area.

The Bilbao-Abando station has two separate main spaces. The main hall building is U-shaped and has five floors. It was built as part of the 1948 renovation using reinforced concrete combined with granite, limestone and brick to provide the building with a monumental appearance. The second building is an annex to the main one and has a semi-circular shed with 12 arches. One of the most singular aspects of the station is the stained glass that overlooks the train platforms. It is composed of 301 pieces and it is 15 metres wide and 10 metres tall and it was made in 1948 by Jesús Arrechubieta following a sketch by Miguel Pastor Veiga. The glass depicts diverse activities typical of the Biscayan society, as well as emblematic places such as the Basilica of Begoña.

The ground and first floors of the station hold restaurants, gift shops and other services while the third floor holds the rail tracks and platforms as well as other railway-related services.

=== Access ===
- 1 Gran Vía, Biribila Plaza
- Segismundo Moret Street
- 1 Gran Vía (Gran Vía/Plaza Circular exit)

== Railway services ==
The station has traditionally served long-distance and commuter-rail Cercanías services. The station has the peculiarity of not having any regional medium-distance services, something unusual for a terminus station located in a city of the size of Bilbao. This lack of services is compensated by the close proximity of Bilbao-Concordia and Zazpikaleak/Casco Viejo stations, which offer local and regional services to the cities of Santander, León and San Sebastián.

=== Long distance services ===
The long-distance services concentrate all the non-local passenger services in the station. There are three main lines serving at the station.

Preceding station	Renfe Operadora	Following station
Miranda de Ebro towards Madrid Chamartín	Alvia	Terminus
Miranda de Ebro towards Barcelona Sants	Alvia	Terminus
Laudio towards Vigo-Guixar	Intercity	Terminus

In addition, two former lines called at this station before shutting down:

Preceding station	Renfe Operadora	Following station
Miranda de Ebro towards Málaga María Zambrano	Estrella "Picasso" closed in 2012	Terminus
Laudio towards Salamanca	Diurno "Iberia" closed in 2012	Terminus

=== Local services ===
Bilbao-Abando is the main hub of Cercanías Bilbao, a commuter-rail network operated by Cercanías, which is part of Renfe. Cercanías offers rapid transit-like services between central Bilbao and other municipalities across its metropolitan area, with services similar to that of a metro network but with fewer stops.

Preceding station	Cercanías Bilbao	Following station
Zabalburu towards Santurtzi	Line C-1	Terminus
Zabalburu towards Muskiz	Line C-2	Terminus
Miribilla towards Orduña	Line C-3	Terminus

== Other services ==
Bilbao-Abando is located in close proximity of the Bilbao-Concordia railway station which is part of the narrow-gauge network with local services to Balmaseda and Karrantza as well as regional services to Santander and León. Bilbao-Abando is connected directly to Bilbao-Concordia via a pedestrian access. The Zazpikaleak/Casco Viejo station is located at around 600 metres from Bilbao-Abando. This station is operated by Euskotren Trena and from there trains run to Durango, Elgoibar and San Sebastián.

=== Rapid transit ===
Besides the long-distance and local services, Bilbao-Abando is also connected to the Abando metro station, which is served by Lines 1 and 2 of the Bilbao Metro. It is an underground station located outside of the Bilbao-Abando railway station, but nevertheless connected to it directly. It opened on 11 November 1995. It follows the typical cavern-shaped layout of most underground Bilbao Metro stations designed by Norman Foster, with the main hall located directly above the rail tracks.

=== Tram ===
The Abando stop of the Bilbao tram, operated by Euskotren, is located on Navarra street at a distance of about 200 metres from the Bilbao-Abando station. The tram connects the district of Abando with Ibaiondo and Basurto-Zorroza.

Preceding station	Euskotren Tranbia	Following station
Pío Baroja towards La Casilla	Bilbao tram	Arriaga towards Bolueta

=== Bus ===
The station is served by the following local Bilbobus services. A 'G' in the line name denotes a Gautxori night line service.

- 10 Elorrieta - Plaza Circular
- A1 Asunción - Plaza Circular
- A2 Solokoetxe - Plaza Circular
- A5 Prim - Plaza Circular
- G2 Otxarkoaga - Plaza Circular
- G3 Larraskitu - Plaza Circular
- G4 La Peña - Plaza Circular
- G5 San Adrián / Miribilla - Plaza Circular
- G6 Zorrotza - Plaza Circular
- G7 Mina del Morro - Plaza Circular
- G8 Arangoiti - Plaza Circular

The station is also served by the following regional Bizkaibus services, running to other municipalities within the Bilbao metropolitan area or elsewhere in Biscay.

- A2314 Bilbao - Erandio Goikoa - UPV/EHU
- A2322 Bilbao - Astrabudua - UPV/EHU
- A2324 Bilbao - UPV/EHU (through Enekuri)
- A3115 Bilbao - Santurtzi
- A3122 Bilbao - Barakaldo - Sestao - Errepelega
- A3136 Bilbao - Barakaldo - Santurtzi
- A3144 Bilbao - Barakaldo (through Ugarte)
- A3151 Bilbao - Stz. - Portugalete (A-8)
- A3336 Muskiz - Bilbao (through Ortuella)
- A3340 Muskiz - Abando - Bilbao (A-8)
- A3514 Bilbao - Zornotza - Gernika
- A3515 Bilbao - Zornotza - Gernika - Bermeo
- A3521 Bilbao - Hosp. Sta. Marina
- A3911 Durango - Lemoa - Galdakao-Usansolo Hospital - Bilbao
- A3912 Eibar - Lemoa - Galdakao-Usansolo Hospital - Bilbao
- A3917 Zeanuri - Lemoa - Galdakao-Usansolo Hospital - Bilbao
- A3925 Ubide - Otxandio - Lemoa - Bilbao
