= Cercanías Bilbao =

Railway network in Bilbao, Spain

Cercanías Bilbao Bilboko Aldiriak

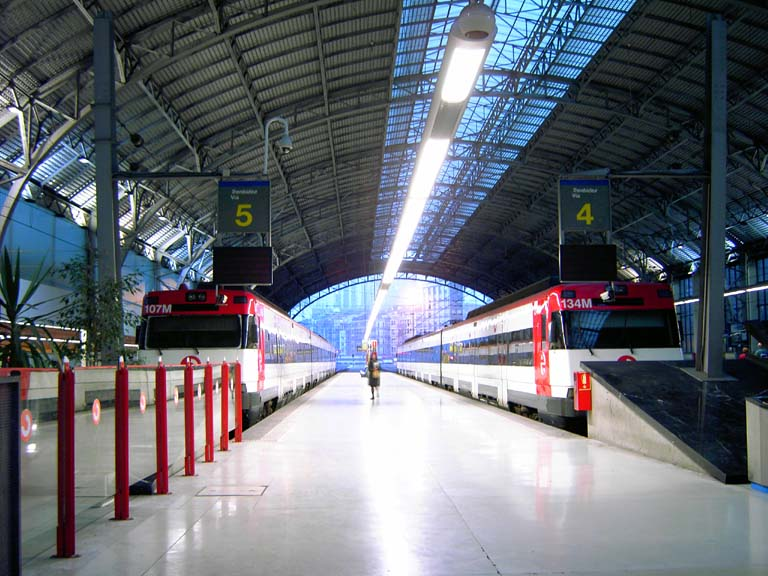
- Cercanías units at Bilbao-Abando

Overview
- Owner: Renfe
- Locale: Bilbao
- Transit type: Commuter rail
- Number of lines: 5
- Number of stations: 69
- Annual ridership: 16,090,887 (2025)
- Website: Official Website

Operation
- Operator: Cercanías

Technical
- System length: 126.5 km (78.6 mi)

Cercanías Bilbao (Basque: Bilboko Aldiriak) is a commuter rail network in Bilbao, serving the city and its metropolitan area. It is operated by Cercanías, as part of Renfe, the national railway company. It consists of five lines, named C-1, C-2, C-3, C-4 and C-5. The first three of them start at the Bilbao-Abando station, which is the central station of the city, whereas the fourth starts at the Bilbao-Concordia station and the fifth at Aranguren station, in the west of the province.

== System ==
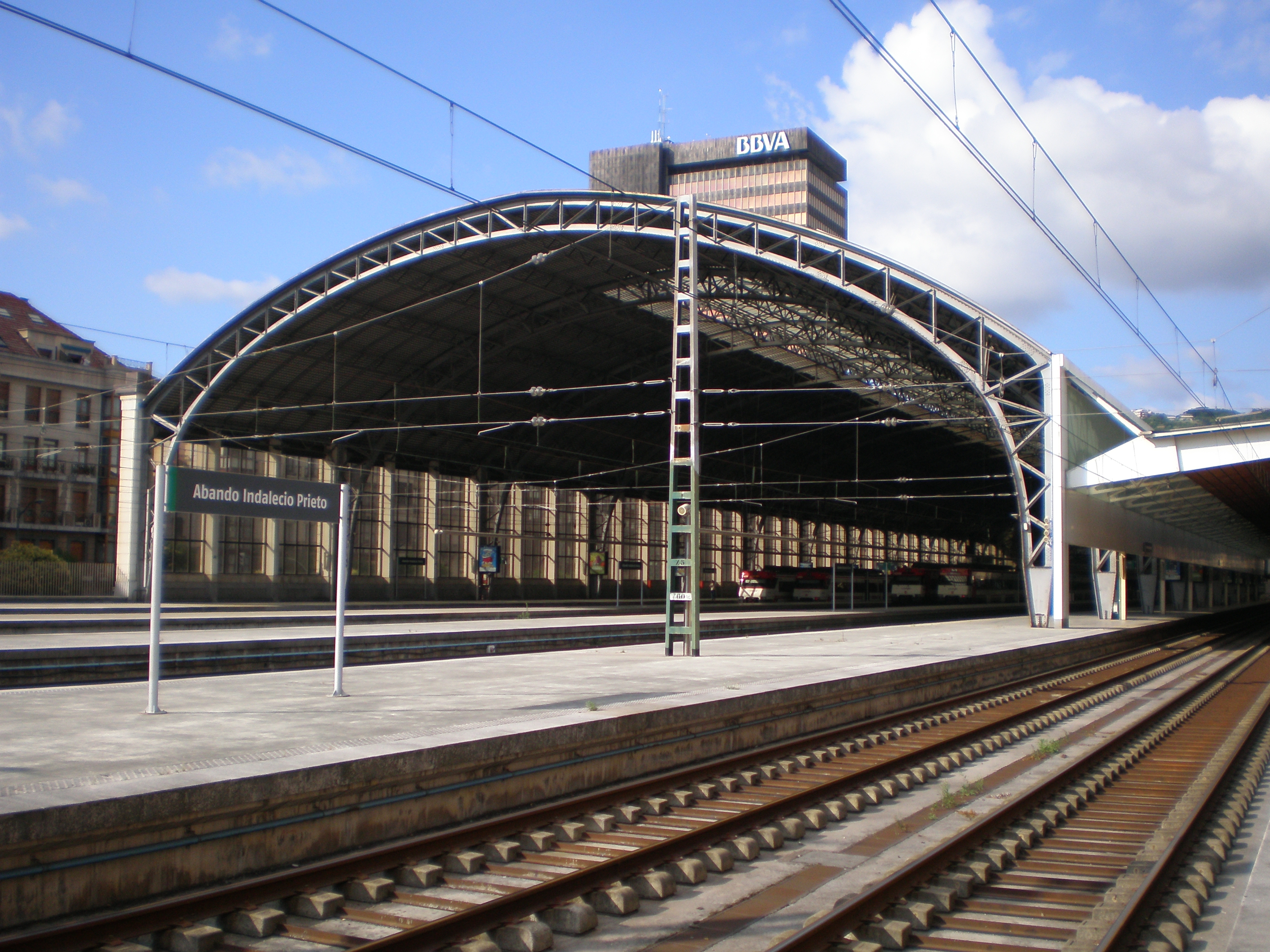
Bilbao-Abando railway station.

Cercanías Bilbao follows the same patterns as other Cercanías networks in the country, as Cercanías Madrid or Cercanías Barcelona. The network consists of five lines, four of which start at the capital of the province. They all link the center of Bilbao with other municipalities within and beyond the metropolitan area. The fifth, instead, connects the rural areas of Enkarterri between themselves. There are five lines, named C-1, C-2, C-3, C-4 and C-5; the first two follow the Estuary of Bilbao, the C-3 reaches municipalities outside the metropolitan area, and the C-4 and C-5 reach the westernmost area of Biscay. The network has connections with the Bilbao Metro (rapid transit), Renfe (regional and long-distance trains), the tram and Bilbao's bus station, Termibus.

=== Lines ===
Line	Terminals	Stations	Length in km
C-1	Bilbao-Santurtzi	14	13.6
C-2	Bilbao-Muskiz	18	21.0
C-3	Bilbao-Orduña	22	40.3
C-4	Bilbao-Balmaseda	21	33.5
C-5	Aranguren-Karrantza	6	26.0

Current Cercanías network.

=== Service frequencies ===
As of 2025, there are the typical service frequencies for each line:

- Line C-1 - Trains each 30 minutes at early time in the morning and at late nights; trains each 20 minutes at peak times.
- Line C-2 - Trains each 30 minutes at early time in the morning and at late nights; trains each 20 minutes at peak times.
- Line C-3 - Trains each 30 minutes at early time in the morning and at late nights; trains each 15 minutes at peak times. Half the trains only reach Llodio.
- Line C-4 - Trains each 60 minutes at early time in the morning and at late nights; trains each 30 minutes at peak times.
- Line C-5 - Trains each 100 minutes at early time in the morning and at late nights.

=== Stations ===
Cercanías Bilbao serves the following stations:

Line C-1	Line C-2	Line C-3	Line C-4	Line C-5
Bilbao-Abando Station; Zabalburu; Ametzola; Autonomía; San Mamés; Olabeaga; Zorrotza; Lutxana-Barakaldo; Desertu-Barakaldo; Sestao; La Iberia; Portugalete; Peñota; Santurtzi	Bilbao-Abando Station; Zabalburu; Ametzola; Autonomía; San Mamés; Olabeaga; Zorrotza; Lutxana-Barakaldo; Desertu-Barakaldo; Galindo; Trápaga; Valle de Trápaga-Trapagaran; Urioste; Sagrada Familia; Ortuella; Gallarta; Putxela; Muskiz	Bilbao-Abando Station; Miribilla; La Peña; Ollargan; Bidebieta-Basauri; Abaroa-San Miguel; Basauri; Arrigorriaga; Ugao-Miraballes; Bakiola; Arrakundiaga; Arbide; Arakaldo; Areta; Laudio/Llodio; Santa Cruz de Llodio; Luiando; Salbio; Amurrio Iparralde; Amurrio; Iñarratxu; Orduña	Bilbao La Concordia Station; Ametzola; Basurto Hospital; Zorrotza Zorrozgoiti; Santa Ageda; Kastrexana; Irauregi-Alonsotegi; Zaramillo; La Quadra; Sodupe; Artxube; Lanbarri; Güeñes; Aranguren-station; Aranguren-halt; Zalla; Colegio; Ibarra; La Herrera; Balmaseda; La Calzada	Aranguren-station; Mimetiz; Traslaviña; Artzentales; Valle de Villaverde; Karrantza

== Rolling stock ==
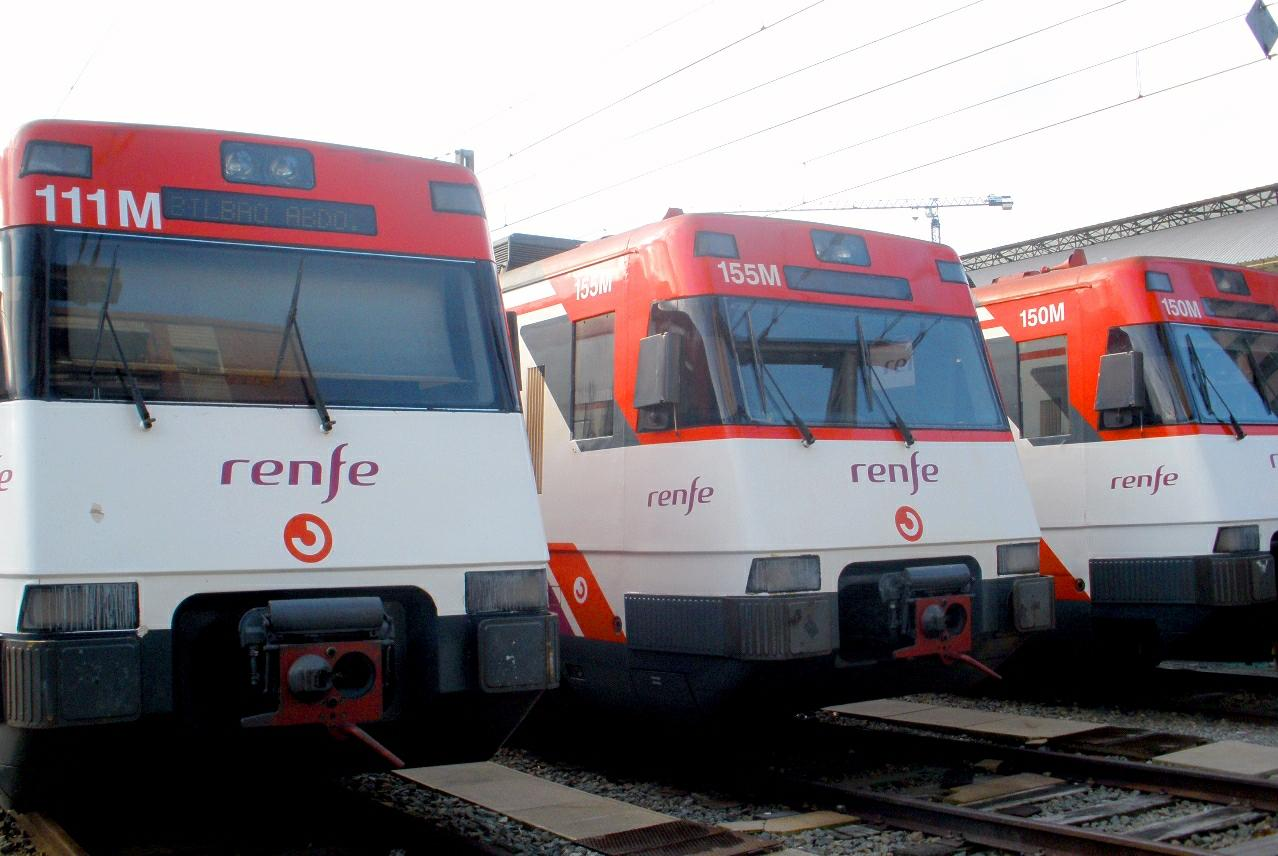
Three UT446 units at Bilbao-Abando depot.

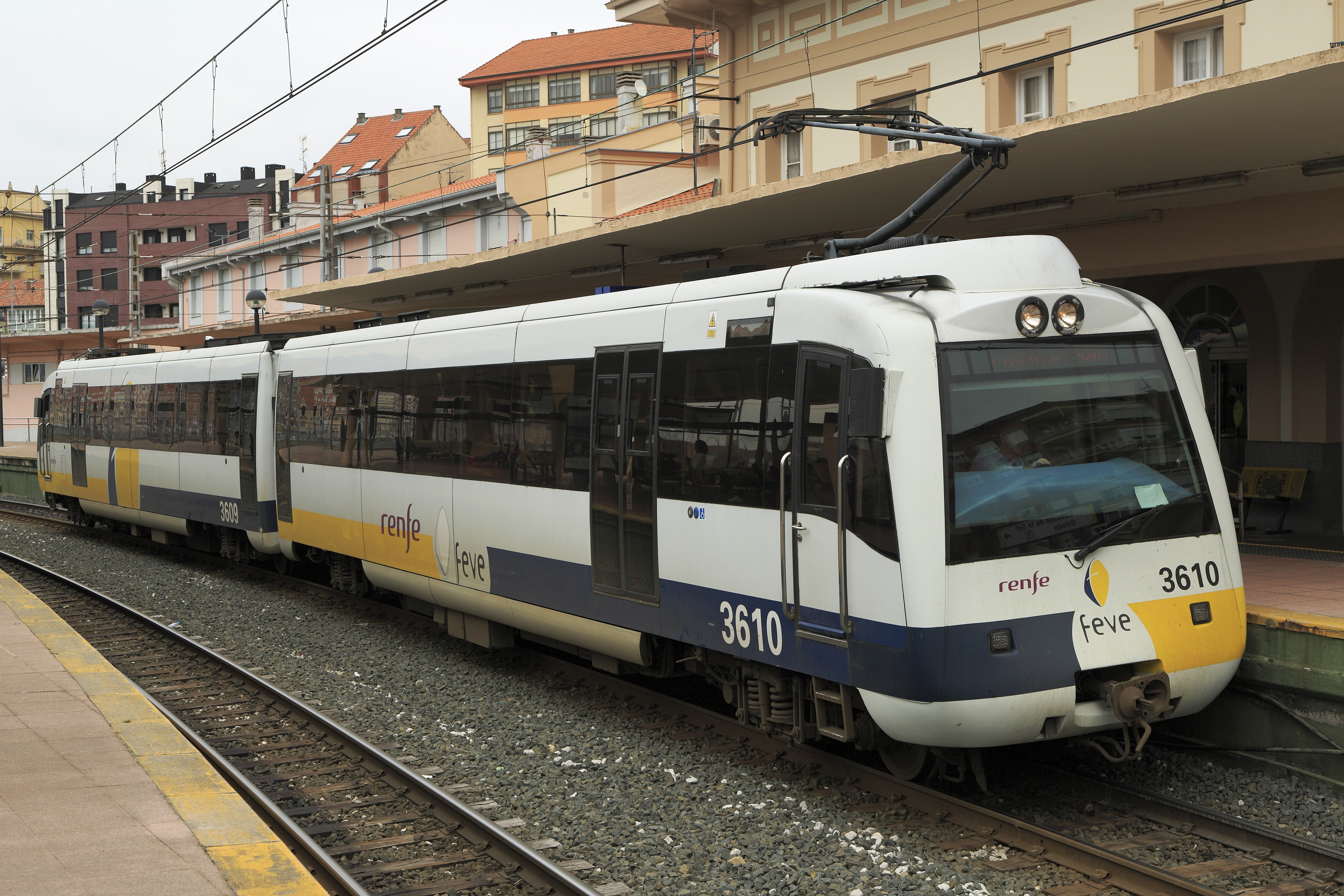
A UT436 units.

The rolling stock for the first three lines consists of UT 446 electrical multiple units built by CAF, each one formed by three cars. The last two lines use different units, UT 436, given by the former operator FEVE, since they are of metric gauge.

== Developments ==
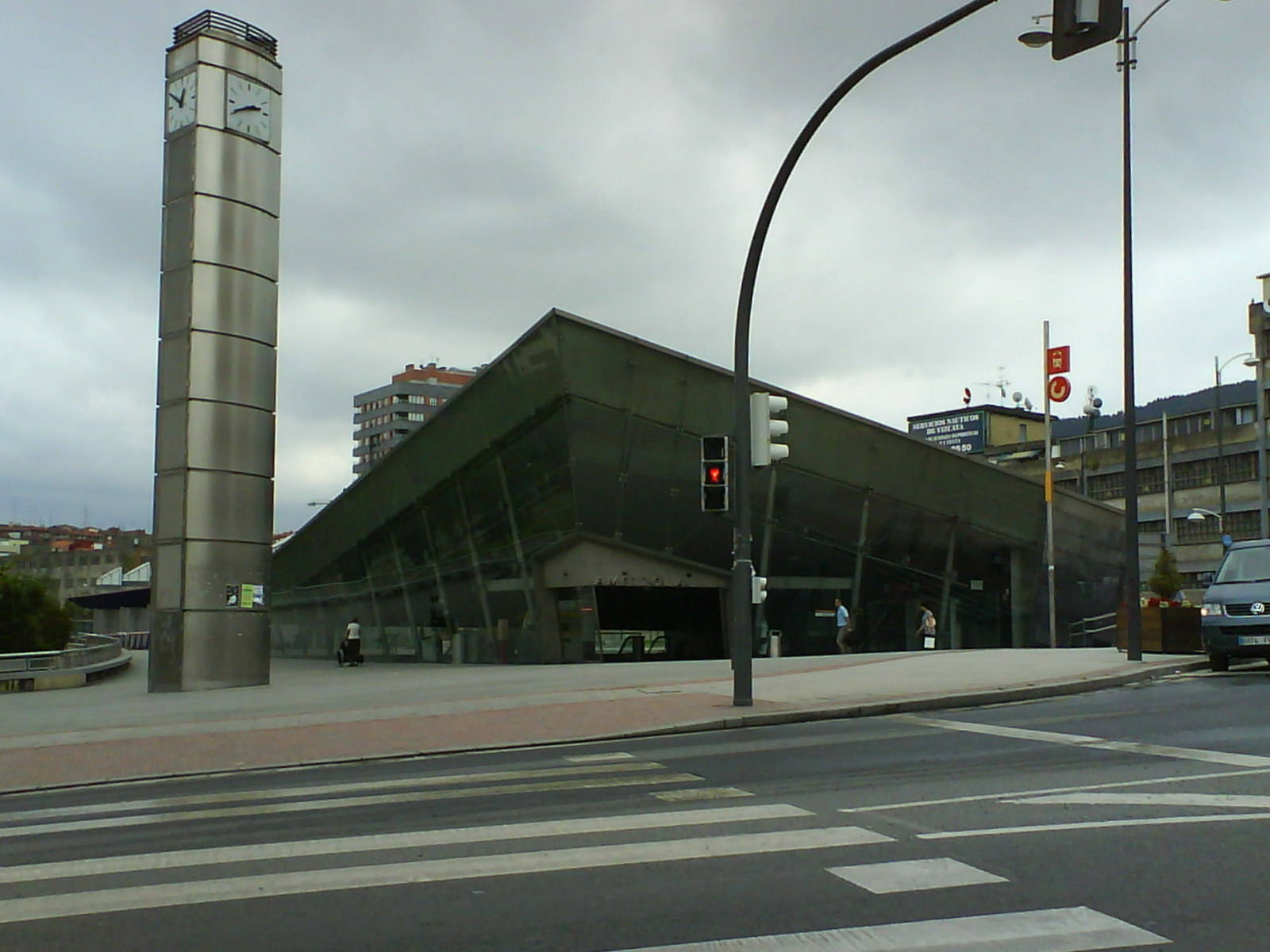
Ametzola station.

These are the recent projects that have been developed or will be started in the network.

=== Southern rail branch (C-1, C-2 and C-4) ===
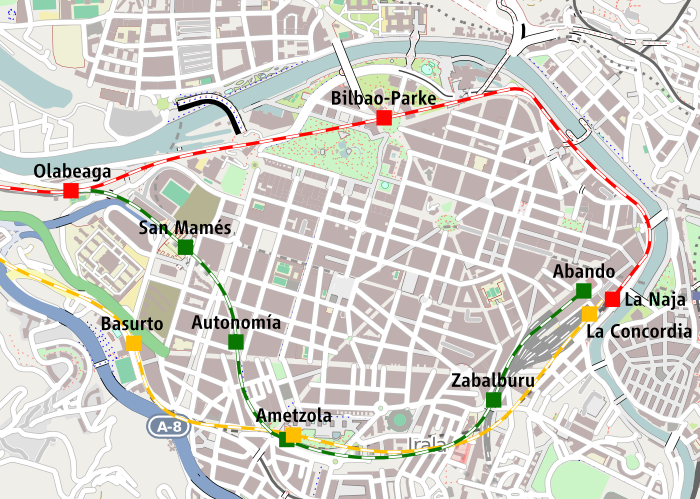
Variante Sur in green, with former surface alignment in red

In year 2000 the network was renewed by the public company Bilbao Ria 2000, several new underground stations were opened in the city of Bilbao, a project that was called Southern rail branch (Variante sur ferroviaria).

This change implied the closing of Parke/Guggenheim and Bilbao-La Naja stations, on the line that run beside the river before that date. This cleared ground for the creation of new riverside avenues and the tramway. The tracks used for the new branch were used before for freight transport, these tracks were covered and a new avenue and the park of Ametzola were created on top of them. The stations on the new branch are:

- San Mamés
- Autonomía
- Ametzola
- Zabalburu

The former Bilbao-La Naja terminal station gave way to Bilbao-Abando, where C1 and C2 services arrive and depart now. Formerly this station was used only by C3 and long-distance services, to cope with the increase of traffic two new covered platforms were added to the station, increasing the number of platforms from six to eight. The remains of Bilbao-La Naja station can still be seen beside the Arenal Bridge. The C4 station, that followed a similar track, was moved underground too

The Ametzola area was a rail yard, that was dismantled to create new parks and residential areas.

=== Santurtzi station (C-1) ===
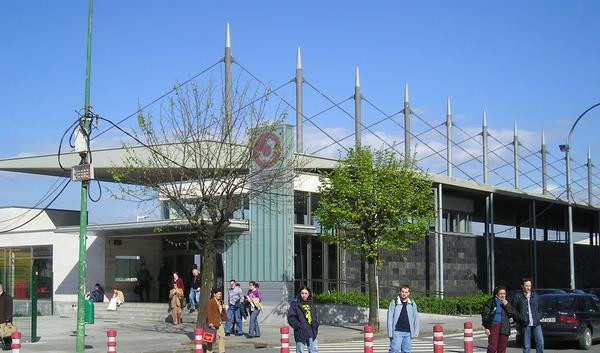
The new Santurtzi station.

The new Santurtzi station was built close to the old one by Bilbao Ria 2000 and inaugurated on July 10, 2003. The space that the old station occupied is used now as a parking lot, but will be renewed to extend the nearby park.

=== Miribilla station (C-3) ===
This station was opened on December 16, 2008, and links the newly developed neighbourhoods with central Bilbao. This is Spain's deepest underground station, the access to the platforms is provided by high capacity elevators.

=== La Calzada station (C-4) ===
This station opened in 2009 and it extended the C4 line one more station, while still staying in the town of Balmaseda. This gave railway access to the newly urbanized area as well as to sports centre users.

=== Mimetiz station (C-5) ===
This station opened in 2013, substituting the dismantled nearby Otxaran station.

=== Amurrio Iparralde station (C-3) ===
Works have started in the new Iparralde station, in the town of Amurrio.

=== Barakaldo station (C-1/C-2) ===
This station will be renewed, 200 m of tracks will be covered, improving the newly developed neighbourhoods of Barakaldo.

=== Portugalete station (C-1) ===
This station will be covered, a mall will be created on top of it and lifts will provide access from central Portugalete.

=== Vizcaya Bridge station (C-1) ===
There is a proposal to build this underground station, intermediate between Portugalete and Peñota stations, that would provide a direct link to Vizcaya Bridge.

== See also ==
- Bilbao rail network
- Bilbao Metro
- Euskotren Trena
