= Bilbao Metro =

Rapid transit system in Bilbao, Spain

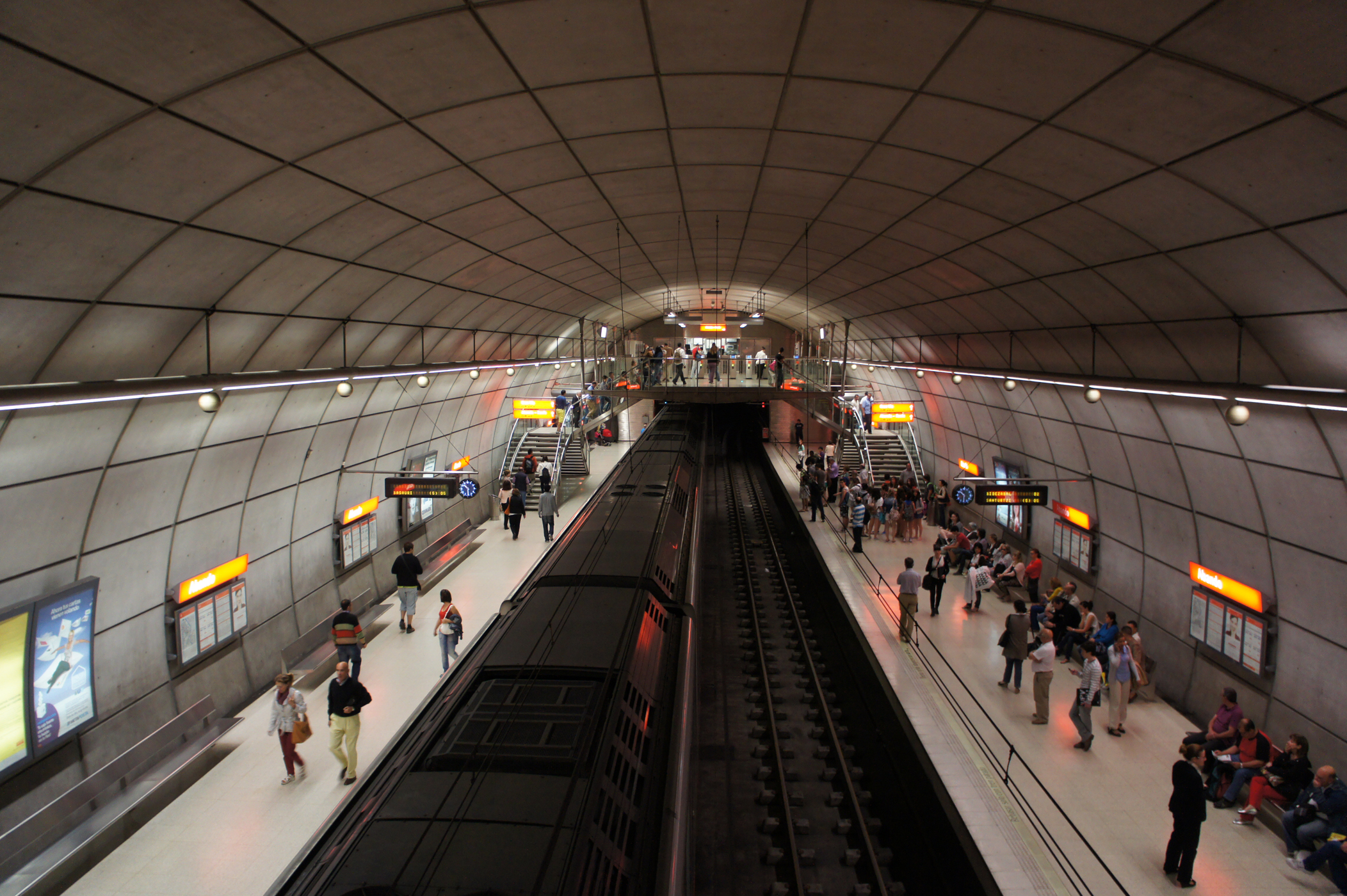
- Abando station has the usual design for cavern stations.

Overview
- Native name: Metro de Bilbao (Spanish); Bilboko metroa (Basque)
- Locale: Greater Bilbao, Basque Country, Spain
- Transit type: Rapid transit
- Number of lines: 3
- Number of stations: 48 (Note: There are 42 stations on the original system operated by Metro Bilbao (Lines 1 and 2), and 7 on Line 3, operated by Euskotren. Zazpikaleak/Casco Viejo station is counted once.)
- Annual ridership: 104.5 million (2025)
- Website: Metro Bilbao; L3 - Euskotren

Operation
- Began operation: 11 November 1995; 31 years ago
- Operators: Metro Bilbao; Euskotren

Technical
- System length: 51 km (31.7 mi) (Note: The original system operated by Metro Bilbao (Lines 1 and 2) has a length of 45.1 km (28.0 mi). Line 3, operated by Euskotren, has a length of 5.9 km (3.7 mi).)
- No. of tracks: 2 (mostly); 1 (Urduliz–Plentzia)
- Track gauge: 1,000 mm (3 ft 3 3/8 in) metre gauge
- Electrification: 1,500 V DC overhead catenary
System map

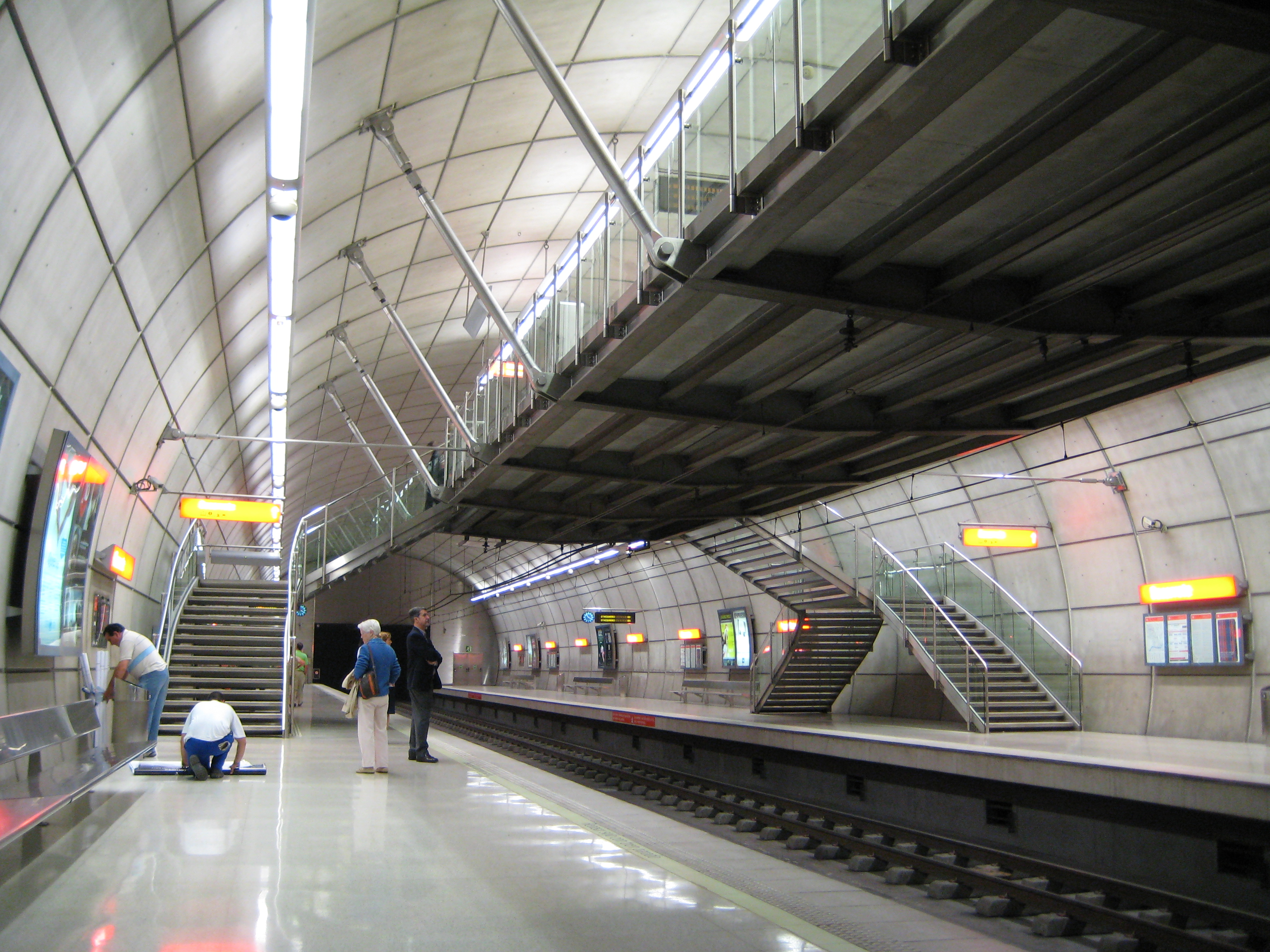
Basarrate station (Lines 1 and 2), with the characteristic "cavern" architecture that most stations have

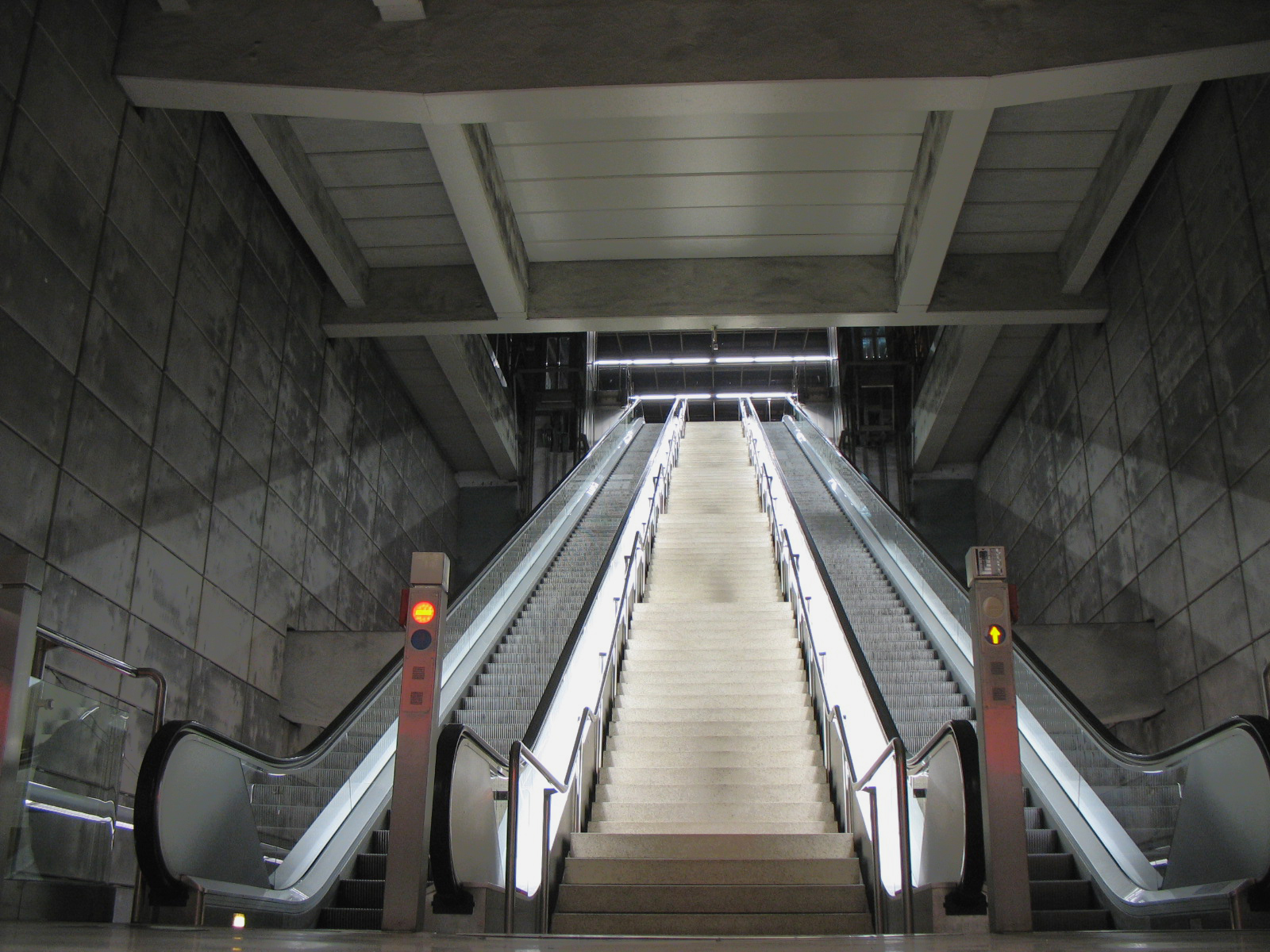
Sarriko station (Lines 1 and 2), featuring a glassed entrance

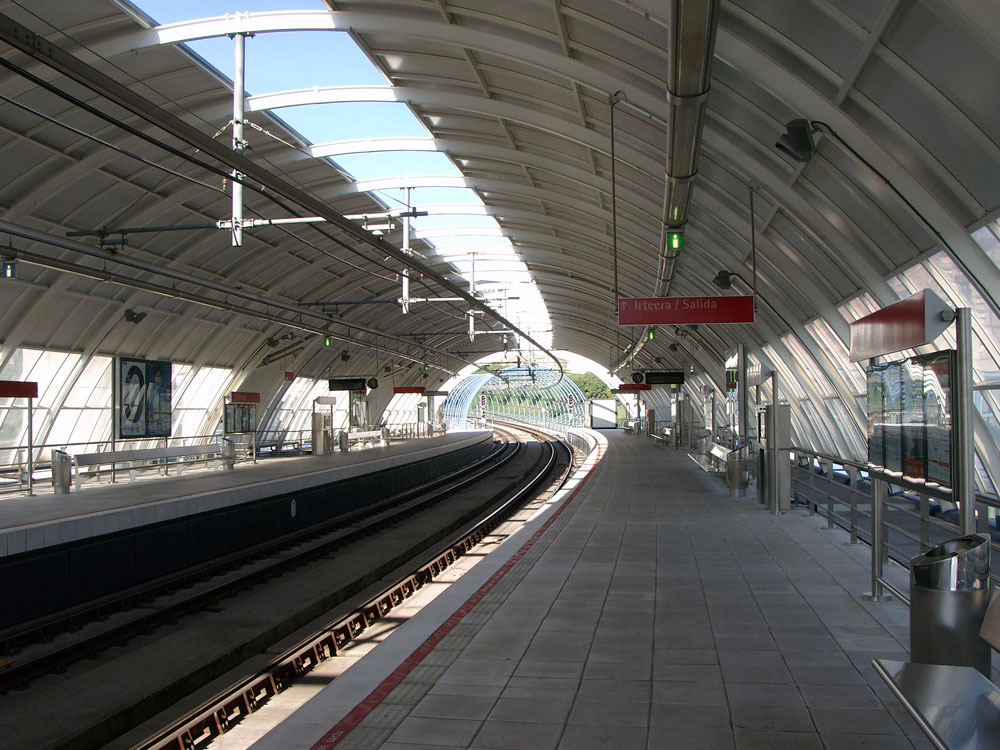
Urbinaga station (Line 2), curved, in an uphill and on a viaduct

The Bilbao Metro (Spanish: Metro de Bilbao, Basque: Bilboko metroa) is a rapid transit system serving the city of Bilbao and the region of Greater Bilbao. Lines 1 and 2 have a "Y" shape, as they transit both banks of the river Ibaizabal and then combine to form one line that ends in the south of Bilbao. Line 3 connects the higher neighbourhoods to the east of Bilbao. All three current lines meet at Zazpikaleak/Casco Viejo station. The Metro is connected with the Bilbao tram, Bilboko Aldiriak (commuter rail services), Euskotren Trena (commuter rail services), Feve (commuter rail services, regional and long-distance trains), Renfe long-distance trains, and Bilbao's bus station (Bilbao Intermodal). All three lines use metre gauge.

As of 2021, the Metro operates on 51 kilometers (32 mi) of route, with 48 stations. It is the third-busiest metro in Spain, after the Madrid and Barcelona metro systems. The system was inaugurated in 1995, partially taking over a suburban railway line operated by Euskotren, first opened in 1887. A second line was added in 2002, running together with Line 1 within Bilbao, and then serving towns along the left bank of the Ibaizabal-Nervion estuary. Lines 1 and 2 are operated by Metro Bilbao, a company owned by the Biscay Transport Consortium. Line 3, operated by Euskotren, opened in 2017. Unlike the first two lines, which form an isolated system, Line 3 is operated jointly with the Euskotren Trena commuter railway network.

== Lines and stations ==
=== Lines ===
Line	Terminals	Length	Stations	Operator
	Plentzia–Etxebarri	28.83 km (17.91 mi)	29	Metro Bilbao
	Kabiezes–Basauri	22.98 km (14.28 mi)	25	Metro Bilbao
	Matiko–Kukullaga	5.88 km (3.65 mi)	7	Euskotren
TOTAL		51.64 km (32.09 mi) (Note: The section between San Ignazio and Etxebarri is shared by Lines 1 and 2. The shared stretch has a length of 10.39 kilometres (6.46 mi) and 12 stations.)	48 (Note: Zazpikaleak/Casco Viejo, a transfer station between Lines 1/2 and 3 is counted once.)	

=== Stations ===
The main station of the network is Zazpikaleak/Casco Viejo, the only one in which all three lines meet. Since Line 3 is operated as part of the wider Euskotren Trena network, the station is also the main hub for Euskotren's commuter railway services in Bilbao. Other important interchange stations are Abando (connections to Cercanías and Feve commuter railway lines and Renfe's long distance services) and San Mamés (connections to Cercanías and the main bus terminal). Urbinaga station on Line 2 was built as a future interchange station with two Cercanías commuter rail lines. However, as of 2021, the commuter rail station is not yet built, having been postponed several times.

Additionally, the Bilbao tram has stops near the San Mamés, Abando and Zazpikaleak/Casco Viejo stations. Besides this, most stations have several bus connections.

=== Connections ===
- Bolueta
  - Euskotren TRAM: Line A.
  - Bizkaibus: Lines A2610, A3613, A3622, A3932.
  - Bilbobus: Line 30 (only Sundays until 3:00 PM) and line 40.
- Basarrate
  - Bilbobus: Lines 13, 34, 40, 43, 48 lines and G7 night line.
- Zazpikaleak/Casco Viejo (Old Town)
  - Euskotren TRAIN: Lines E1 (Amara-Donostia), E3 (Lezama) and E4 (Bermeo)
  - Euskotren TRAM: Line A (Bolueta - La Casilla)
  - Bilbobus: Lines 11, 22, 62, A9 lines and, G4 and G8 night lines.
- Abando
  - Renfe Cercanías: Lines C-1 (Santurtzi), C-2 (Muskiz), C-3 (Orduña/Llodio) and C-4 (Balmaseda)
  - Renfe Long and Medium Distance: Long distance (Madrid, Barcelona, Miranda de Ebro)
  - Euskotren TRAM: Line A (La Casilla - Bolueta)
  - Renfe Cercanías AM : R-3f (Bilbao-Concordia / Santander), R-3b (Bilbao-Concordia / Carranza) and T-1 (Transacantábrico)
  - Bizkaibus : Lines A2314, A2322, A2324, A3115, A3122, A3136, A3137, A3144, A3151, A3223, A3336, A3340, A3514, A3515, A3911, A3912, A3917 and A3925.
  - Bilbobus : Lines 01, 03, 10, 28, 30, 40, 56, 58, 62, 71, 72, 75, 77, 85, A1, A2, A5, A7, A9 lines and G1, G2, G3, G4, G5, G6, G7 and G8 night lines (Gautxori)
- San Mamés
  - Renfe Cercanías : Lines C-1 (Bilbao-Abando / Santurtzi) and C-2 (Bilbao-Abando / Muskiz).
  - Euskotren Tranbia : Line A (La Casilla - Bolueta).
  - Bilbao Intermodal (central long-distance bus station).
- San Ignazio
  - Bilbobus: Lines 10, 13, 18 and 71.
- Lutxana
  - Euskotren Trena (TRAIN): Shuttle line E3a (Lutxana - Sondika)

In addition, most other stations have connections to different bus lines.

== History ==
=== Background and early proposals ===
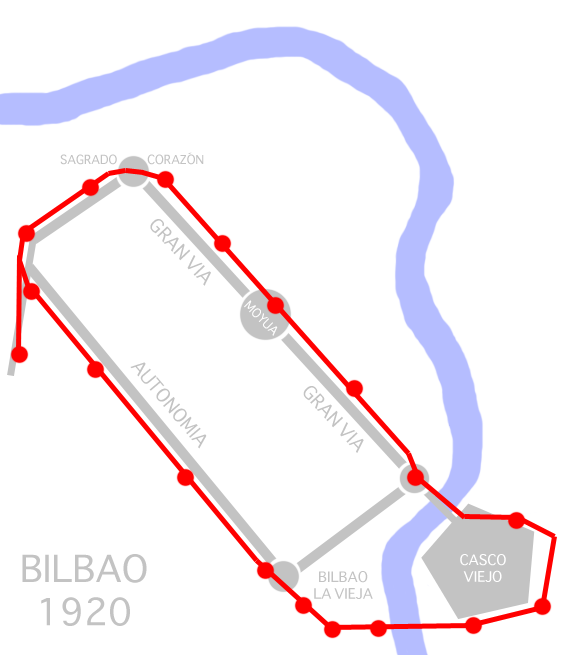
1920s project

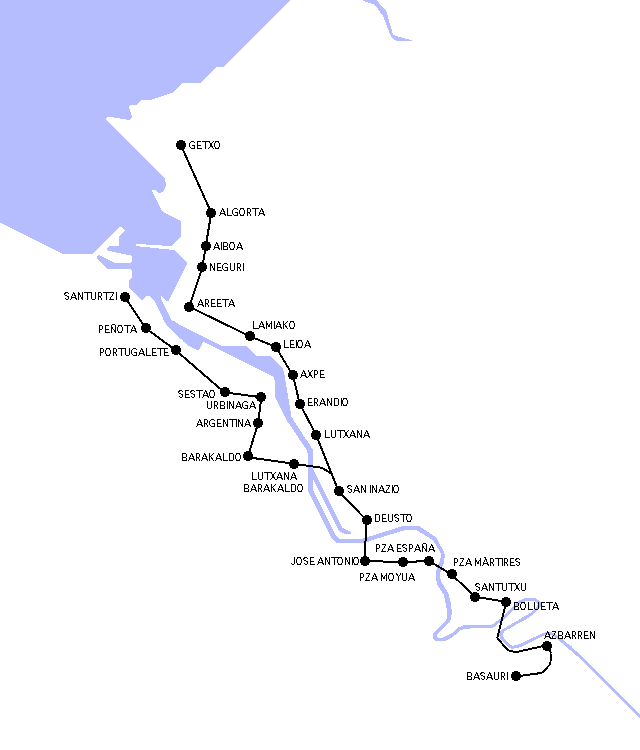
Alternative 1 planned for 1985, almost identical to the final project

The first proposal for building a metro system in Bilbao was made in the 1920s. The network was planned to have two lines connecting Atxuri station with the westernmost parts of the city (at the time), each running via a different route. Banco Español de Crédito, which was to have backed the project financially, withdrew in 1925; rendering the project infeasible. The proposal for a metro system was definitively abandoned after the civil war.

In 1971 the government of Biscay, the Bilbao City Council and the Commerce Bureau created a commission to evaluate the transportation needs of Greater Bilbao. In 1974, the Spanish government pledged to give financial support to a metro project.

In 1976, the Biscay Transport Consortium was created. Two years later, in 1977, three proposals were made to build a metro line by 1985. Of these proposals, the first one was almost identical to the current network. The project for the construction of a metro was approved in 1977. However, many objections were raised against it, which together with disagreements between different institutions put the project on hold.

In 1983 the Basque Government approved a plan for transportation on the right bank of the Estuary of Bilbao, but its execution was delayed. The document was rewritten in 1985, and in 1987 the plan to build and fund the Metro was approved.

A company, Metro Bilbao, was established on 18 February 1993 with a capital of 10 million pesetas and the Biscay Transport Consortium as its only shareholder. It is owned by the Biscay Transport Consortium, itself dependent on the Basque Government and the Foral Deputation of Biscay. The ownership of the metro infrastructure is shared by the Biscay Transport Consortium and Euskal Trenbide Sarea. The Basque narrow-gauge railway network in which the Bilbao Metro has its origins (Line 1 took over most of the existing Bilbao-Plentzia railway) had been managed by Basque Railways (known as Euskotren after 1996) since 1982. However, a separate company was established to manage the metro.

The management of the Metro system by an independent company was a result of the 1975 law that established the Biscay Transport Consortium and the 1983 Law of Historical Territories. The creation of a separate company has been criticized as a political decision that left Basque Railways in a weaker position (the Bilbao-Plentzia line was the busiest of its network) and that hindered the reuse of existing infrastructures (particularly in the Txorierri line).

=== Construction ===
A metro system was deemed to be the best way to improve congestion problems in the evolving and regenerating city. The design for the underground stations was awarded to the architects Sir Norman Foster and partners in 1988 following an open competition.

The construction of the first line involved converting to rapid transit standards Euskotren's existing suburban railway line between San Ignazio and Plentzia. The first works started in late 1988, with the existing Erandio station being put underground. In the city itself, a new tunnel was built between San Ignazio and Casco Viejo. The central Plaza Elíptica was closed to pedestrians from 1990 to 1997 due to construction activity. The works were especially complicated in the neighborhoods of Deusto and San Inazio, where the cut and cover tunnel excavation slightly damaged some buildings, was very noisy, and caused severe traffic disruptions. This method of excavation contrasted with the tunnel-boring machines used elsewhere in the city.

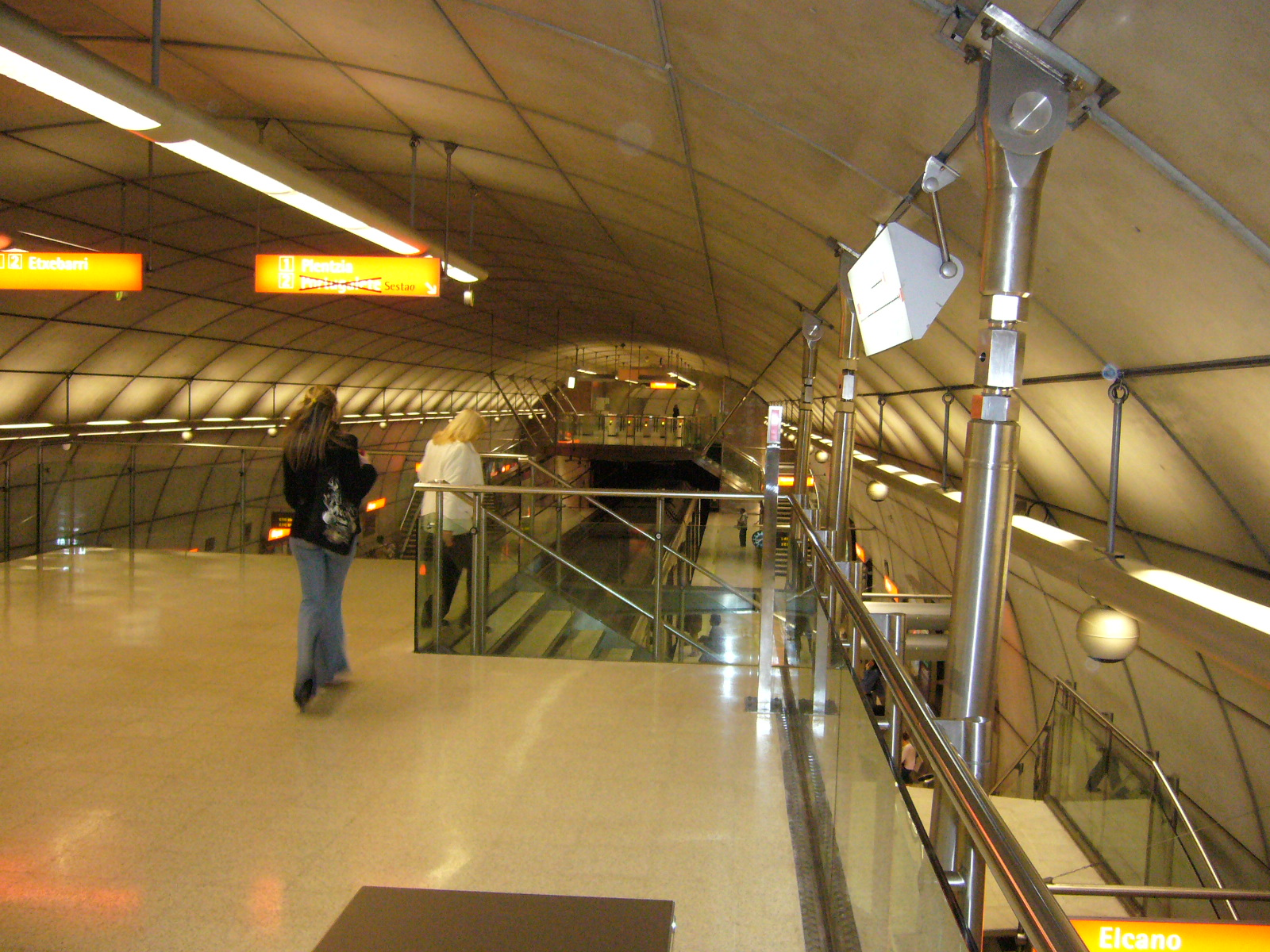
Eliptikoa station, view from the ticket line

==== Line 1 ====
The first stretch of Line 1 was opened on 11 November 1995, with 23 stations between Zazpikaleak/Casco Viejo and Plentzia. The tracks outside Bilbao were previously part of Euskotren's Bilbao-Plentzia line, with parts of the alignment dating from 1887.

By 5 July 1997 the total number of stations was 27 as Santutxu, Basarrate and Bolueta joined Gobela which had opened the previous year.

After the conversion of the Bilbao-Plentzia railway into a rapid transit line, two level crossings remained. The works to remove the first, in the Maidagan neighborhood of Getxo, lasted from 2010 to 2012. The other remaining level crossing, located in Urduliz, was removed between 2015 and 2017; the works involved the construction of a new underground station in Urduliz. In 2020, Ibarbengoa station opened to the public. It was built in 2012, at the same time as the Maidagan level crossing was put underground, but the opening was delayed until its park and ride facilities were built.

==== Line 2 ====
The first line, which runs north of the estuary, was later joined by a second line serving the southern bank of the river. It shares tracks with Line 1 within Bilbao, splitting at San Ignazio, from where it runs to Santurtzi. The first five stations (Gurutzeta/Cruces, Ansio, Barakaldo, Bagatza and Urbinaga) opened on 13 April 2002. The line was extended northwards to Sestao and eastwards to Etxebarri (Etxebarri is also served by Line 1) in early 2005. To the north, Portugalete and Abatxolo opened in 2007; followed by Peñota and Santurtzi in 2009. Two more stations were added to the south in 2011: Ariz in February and Basauri in November. The final extension took place in 2014, with the opening of Kabiezes as the northern terminus of the line.

=== Line 3 ===
Following the commencement of works in the middle of 2009, it was inaugurated on 8 April 2017. It cost 279 million euros, significantly more than the original 153 million euro budget. and was expected to transport 71,000 people according to Bilbao council. The third line has a length of 5.885 km (3.657 mi) and has one station in Etxebarri: Kukullaga-Etxebarri, and six stations in Bilbao: Otxarkoaga, Txurdinaga, Zurbaranbarri, Zazpikaleak/Casco Viejo, Uribarri and Matiko. Euskotren Trena operates the line and also provides commuter rail services along it. That was the original intention when Line 3 was tendered in 2009, but it was later announced that Metro Bilbao would be the operator. In 2013, Euskotren was reconfirmed as the operator.

=== Future ===
Hypothetical future map of the network (Note: Mouya has since been renamed to Eliptikoa)

==== Extensions to existing lines ====
The construction of a new depot in Ortuella was proposed in 2010. Together with the construction of the depot, a new station could be built, extending Line 2 from Kabiezes. Further extensions to the line have been tentatively discarded.

Line 1 might be extended eastwards to Sarratu, in Basauri. This station will provide an interchange with the Euskotren Trena suburban rail network. The station will be built together with Line 5 of the metro, originally proposed as an extension of Line 1, but which will ultimately be built as an extension of Line 3. Consequently, Sarratu will become the eastern terminus of Line 1.

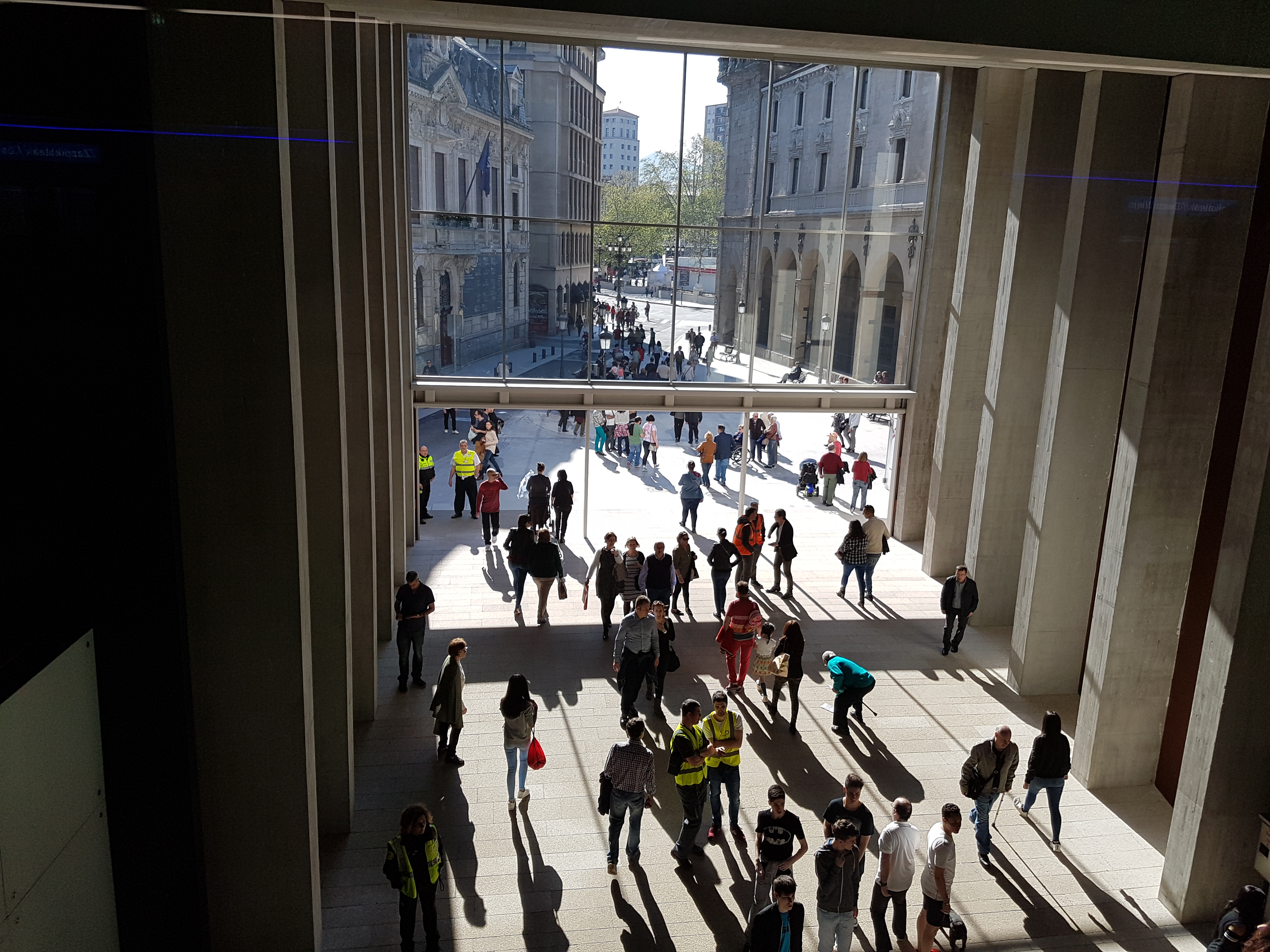
Zazpikaleak/Casco Viejo station (L1, L2 and L3) entrance

There are plans to extend Line 3 to the airport, taking advantage of the double-tracked tunnel built under Mount Artxanda opened in 2017. The first phase would involve rebuilding Sondika station in order to allow trains on the Txorierri line to travel between Matiko and Lezama without the need to reverse. In a second phase, a new underground branch would be built under the runway from Sondika to the airport terminal.

==== Line 4 project ====
The preliminary layout of the future Line 4 (Eliptikoa/Rekalde) was presented on 25 January 2008. The preliminary layout suggests that Eliptikoa Station, which gives service to Line 1 and Line 2, will connect with Rekalde with two intermediate stations: Zabalburu (which has a suburban rail station) and Irala. There have been discussions about the ramifications of whether to connect with either Eliptikoa Station or Bilbao Abando Station, this is due to the fact that Rekalde did not have a Metro connection. Line 3 was planned to connect Rekalde with the rest of the city, but the final plan moved the line in another direction.

The plan to add Rekalde to Line 3 was halted, and the route completely altered. This change was criticised, especially by people from Rekalde. In 2009 a new layout for a new line (Line 4) was considered; this new line would connect Rekalde with the Plaza Elíptica and the latter station with Deusto, taking advantage of the rail tracks of Euskotren Trena, that are in that zone. Matiko station would be connected too. The line would then have the Plaza Euskadi Station ("Euskadi Square Station") after Plaza Elíptica and then cross the river to Deusto (Deusto Station) and a new station in the University of Deusto campus (Unibersitatea), to then reach Matiko (Line 3).

On 5 December 2025, the Provincial Council of Bizkaia and the Basque Government revealed the specifics of an agreement concerning the construction and financing of Line 4. The approved design will connect Matiko and Alonsotegi via the University of Deusto campus, Doña Casilda Iturrizar Park, Plaza Elíptica, Zabalburu, Irala and Rekalde. Construction is expected to begin in late 2027. The agreement includes a commitment to handling all procedures to incorporate the rail infrastructure currently managed by the Administrador de Infraestructuras Ferroviarias in order to further extend the line to Enkarterri, with additional stations in Basurto, Zorrotza, Santa Ageda, Kastrexana, and Iraulegi (in the municipality of Alonsotegi).

==== Line 5 project ====
The preliminary layout for Line 5 was also presented on 25 January 2008. This new line would connect Etxebarri with Galdakao, with a total of five stations (Etxebarri, Aperribai, Galdakao, Galdakao Hospital and Usansolo). Later on, another station was proposed for the Bengoetxe neighborhood of Galdakao. In 2010, at the time of the tendering of the project, the opening of the line was planned for 2016. Sarratu was proposed as the new western terminus of the line, providing an interchange with line 1 and the Euskotren Trena network. The construction of the line was repeatedly delayed due to a lack of funds, in 2017 the opening of the line was expected to occur no earlier than 2026.

In 2018, a proposal was made to convert the existing Euskotren railway line between Usansolo and Etxebarri to metro standards. In early 2019, the new project for the line was presented. It would involve moving the existing Euskotren line to a new underground alignment between Sarratu and Usansolo, serving as a de facto extension of Line 3. Five new stations were planned: Sarratu, Aperribai, Bengoetxe, Galdakao and Galdakao Hospital. In late 2022, the works for the first three sections of the line, between Sarratu and Galdakao Hospital, were tendered for 240 million euro. The works for the third section had to be retendered in March 2023 due to errors in the original budget. As of early 2022, the opening of the line from Sarratu to Galdakao is planned for 2027, while the whole line (including its connection with the Euskotren mainline) is expected to open by 2029.

==== Shuttle connection between Areeta and Sestao stations ====
In 2022, it was announced that a tunnel under the estuary would be completed by 2028. It would incorporate a shuttle train that would travel between the Areeta (Line 1) and Sestao (Line 2) stations in four minutes. Initially, work on the tunnel was scheduled to begin in summer 2024, with an investment of 450 million euros planned. However, due to delays, work on the tunnel for motorised traffic is expected to begin in the first half of 2026, and the future of the shuttle train is unclear.

== Operation ==
=== Zones ===

The Bilbao Metro network is divided into the following fare zones:

- Zone 1 (Bilbao), from Bolueta (main line for L1 and L2) to San Ignazio (main line for L1 and L2), inclusive.
- Zone 1 (North Bilbao), from Bolueta (Line 3) to Otxarkoaga (Line 3), inclusive.
- Zone 2 (Upper Nervion), Etxebarri and Ariz (main line for L1 and L2).
- Zone 2 (Upper Nervion), Kukullaga (Line 3).
- Zone 2 (Right Bank of the river), from Lutxana (Line 1) to Berango (Line 1), inclusive.
- Zone 2 (Left Bank of the river), from Gurutzeta/Cruces (Line 2) to Kabiezes (Line 2), inclusive.
- Zone 3 (Uribe Kosta), from Larrabasterra (Line 1) to Plentzia (Line 1), inclusive.

=== Cards (retired) ===
The Bilbao Metro offered special cards that are personal and cannot be transferred, replaced by Barik cards on 2017, with a time limit of 5 years since the date of issue. They can be obtained at any of the customer service offices of the Bilbao Metro (located in the stations of Ansio, Casco Viejo, San Ignazio and Areeta).

- Carnet Kidea Socio (Kidea Member Card): For use with monthly tickets and Super 50 tickets.
- Carnet Gaztea Joven (Youth Gaztea Card): For use with the youth ticket, monthly ticket and Super 50 tickets.
- Carnet Hirukotrans (Hirukotrans Card): For use with the Hirukotrans ticket.
- Carnet Gizatrans (Gizatrans Card): For use with Gizatrans ticket.
- Carnet Gizatrans para familia numerosa (Gizatrans card for large families): For use with Gizatrans ticket for large families.

=== Tickets and fares ===
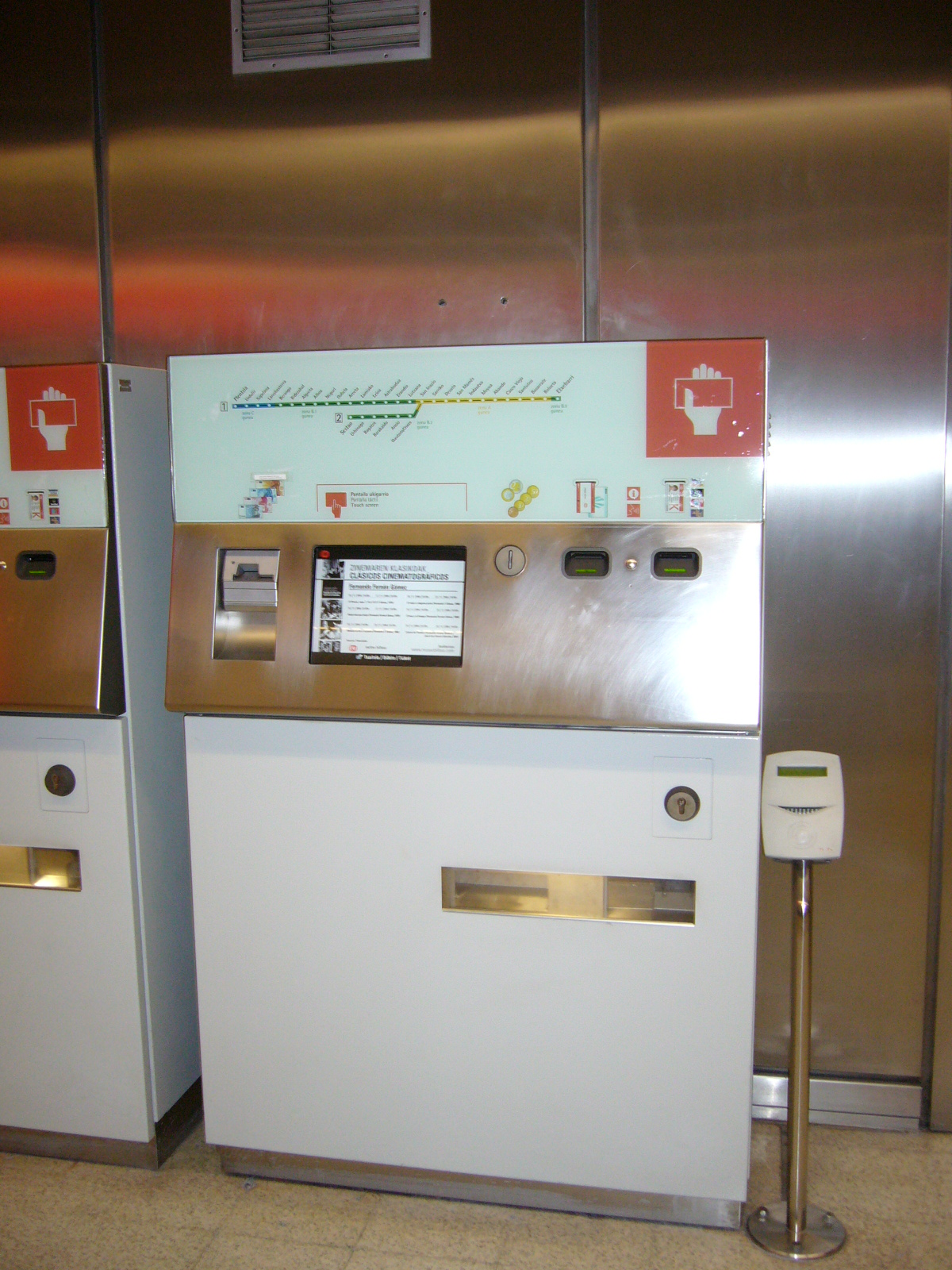
Underground vending machine, where tickets can be acquired

The ticket system is closed, which means that validation of the ticket is required when entering the station and again when exiting.

There are different types of tickets, each of which has a different fare (updated as 2009):

==== Bilbao Metro exclusive use ====
- Occasional ticket: One-way ticket. Can be transferred. Fares: 1 Zone: 1,40€; 2 Zones: 1,50€; 3 Zones: 1,60€
- Round-trip ticket: Valid for two trips (going and coming back). Can be transferred. Fares: 1 Zone: 2,80€; 2 Zones: 3€; 3 Zones: 3,20€
- Billete Día (Day Ticket): Unlimited trips the same day of the expedition of the ticket. Can be transferred. Fare: 4€ (valid in all zones).
- Billete colectivo (Groupal ticket): Valid for one trip or round trip, to be made on a specific date. Only for groups of 20 people or more. Fare: Variable.

===== Retired =====
In 2017 the following tickets was replaced by the Barik cards:

- Billete Mensual (Month Ticket): Unlimited trips in 30 days. Personal and cannot be transferred. A "Carnet Joven" (Youth Card), "Carnet de Socio del Metro" (Metro Honorary Member Card) or "Carnet Plus" (Plus Card) is required to obtain this ticket. Fare: 1 Zone: 29,40€; 2 Zones: 35€; 3 Zones: 40,70€
- Ticket Joven (Youth Ticket): Unlimited trips in 12 months. Personal and cannot be transferred. To obtain one is needed to have less than 26 years and a Youth Card. Fares: 1 Zone: 188€; 2 Zones: 221€; 3 Zones: 255€
- Super 50: Valid for 50 trips, to be made in 30 days. Personal and cannot be transferred. A "Carnet Joven" (Youth Card), "Carnet de Socio del Metro" (Metro Honorary Member Card) or "Carnet Plus" (Plus Card) is required to obtain this ticket. Fares: 1 Zone: 24,50€; 2 Zones: 29€; 3 Zones: 32,50€

==== Combined tickets ====
- Combined ticket with Renfe (Uria): Valid for 10 trips. Can be transferred. Can be obtained in Abando Station and San Mames Station. The Uria ticket can be used in the following stations: Bilbao Metro: Zone A. Cercanías: Bilbao-Abando, Zabalburu Station, Ametzola Station, Autonomía Station, San Mamés Station, Olabeaga Station, Zorrotza Station, Miribilla Station and La Peña Station. The change between Renfe and Metro should be of 20 minutes or less. Fare: 9,65€.
- Combined ticket with Euskotren Trena. Valid for 10 trips, monthly or annual. Valid in the stations of Casco Viejo and Bolueta. The change between Euskotren Trena and Metro should be of 15 minutes or less.

==== Barik cards ====
Barik card

- Creditrans. Valid for as many trips as the money charge (pre-paid) of the card supports. Can be transferred and used several times in the same trip. Creditrans is a pre-paid card that can be used in the Bilbao Metro, Euskotren Trena, the tram, FEVE, Bilbobus, Bizkaibus, Artxanda Funicular, Vizcaya Bridge, Lujua's Bus, Etxebarri Bus and Sopelbus. Fares: 1 Zone: 0,69€; 2 Zones: 0,83€; 3 Zones: 0,93€. Creditrans is the most popular and most used ticket system on the Bilbao Metro and some other transportation systems.
- Gizatrans (only valid for people older than 65 or some kind of physical disadvantage). Personal and cannot be transferred. It can be used in the same places as Creditrans with the exceptions of Sopelbus, FEVE and Vizcaya Bridge. Price (of a single Gizatrans card): 3€. Fares (for the Bilbao Metro): 0,27€ (valid in all zones).
- Hirukotrans (big families). Personal and cannot be transferred. To obtain one is needed to have a Hirukotrans Card. Only available for big families.

Creditrans, Gizatrans and Hirukotrans will no longer be issued after 31 March 2013 as they have been replaced by the Barik electronic card. Any old Creditrans with a credit on them can be used until the end of 2013.

=== Schedules and frequencies ===
The Metro network works from 6:00 am until 11:00 pm from Monday to Thursday, and until 2:00 am on Friday and days before festive days. There is an all night service from Saturday to Sunday, with trains each 15 minutes on the main lines and with a 30-minute frequency on the other lines. During June, July, August and September, the no-interruptions night service also works on Fridays. During "Bilbao's Great Week", there are special services every night.

During weekdays, there is a frequency of 2.5 minutes on Zone A, 5 minutes on Zone B.0, B.1 y B.2 and 18 minutes on Zone C during most of the day.

=== Ridership ===
The Metro system of Bilbao is the third-busiest in Spain. There were significant increases in ridership in 2002 and 2007 due to the enlargement of the network. The milestone of 100 million passenger trips a year was achieved in 2024. The busiest stations are Zazpikaleak/Casco Viejo, San Mamés, Abando, Eliptikoa and Indautxu; all in Bilbao city center, with more than 5 million users each in 2022. Zazpikaleak/Casco Viejo became the busiest station with the opening of Line 3 in 2017;

Annual Ridership (Lines 1 and 2)

Year	riders	±%
1995	3,086,252	—
1996	31,660,119	—
1997	41,493,501	+31.1%
1998	49,102,360	+18.3%
1999	50,886,407	+3.6%
2000	54,173,349	+6.5%
2001	55,894,768	+3.2%
2002	66,705,570	+19.3%
2003	72,609,409	+8.9%
2004	73,088,978	+0.7%
2005	77,801,841	+6.4%
2006	79,780,094	+2.5%
2007	85,864,456	+7.6%
2008	86,333,743	+0.5%
2009	87,043,712	+0.8%
2010	88,556,281	+1.7%

Year	riders	±%
2011	89,616,398	+1.2%
2012	87,615,087	−2.2%
2013	87,133,034	−0.6%
2014	87,397,394	+0.3%
2015	87,535,815	+0.2%
2016	87,105,288	−0.5%
2017	88,172,137	+1.2%
2018	89,918,810	+2.0%
2019	91,570,001	+1.8%
2020	55,987,465	−38.9%
2021	66,779,959	+19.3%
2022	80,376,641	+20.4%
2023	92,380,889	+14.9%
2024	100,363,551	+8.6%
2025	104,508,201	+4.1%

(Line 3)
Year	riders	±%
2017	3,270,684	—
2018	5,037,321	—
2019	5,334,446	+5.9%
2020	3,534,756	−33.7%
2021	4,184,286	+18.4%
2022	5,211,377	+24.5%
2023	5,948,357	+14.1%
2024	7,039,958	+18.4%

== Design ==
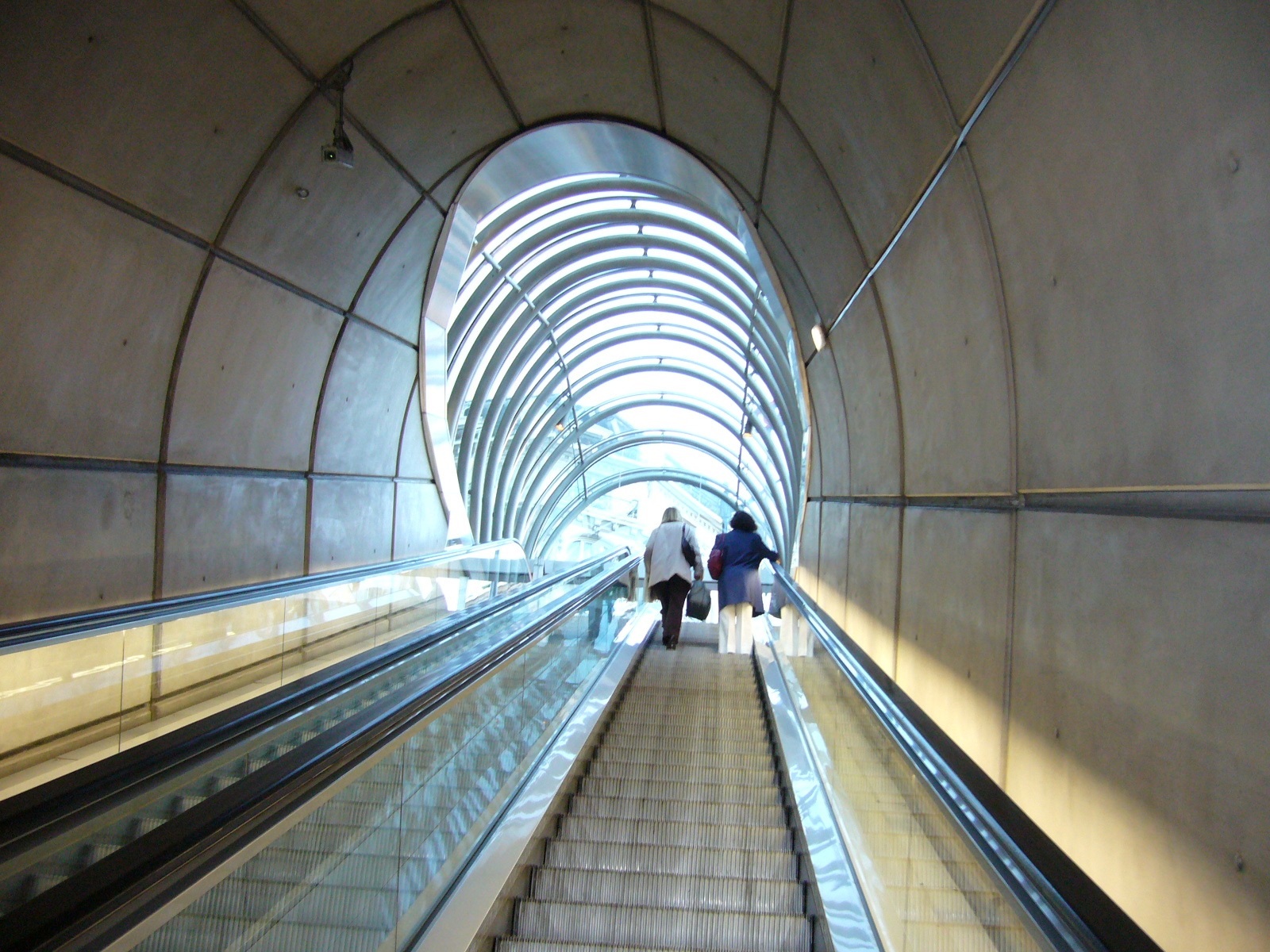
Eliptikoa station exit, view of escalator and fosterito from below

Access to the Metro is provided by fosteritos, glass structures named after the architect who designed them, Norman Foster.

Large caverns of a 160 m^{2} (1,700 sq ft) cross section were dug for stations, creating large open spaces, as opposed to the traditional sets of linked tunnels. For example, the ticket line is in the same space as the trains, for this purpose steel structures called 'mezzanines' have been built over the tracks. Trains are fully accessible by lifts and escalators. Materials such as steel and concrete have been used throughout.

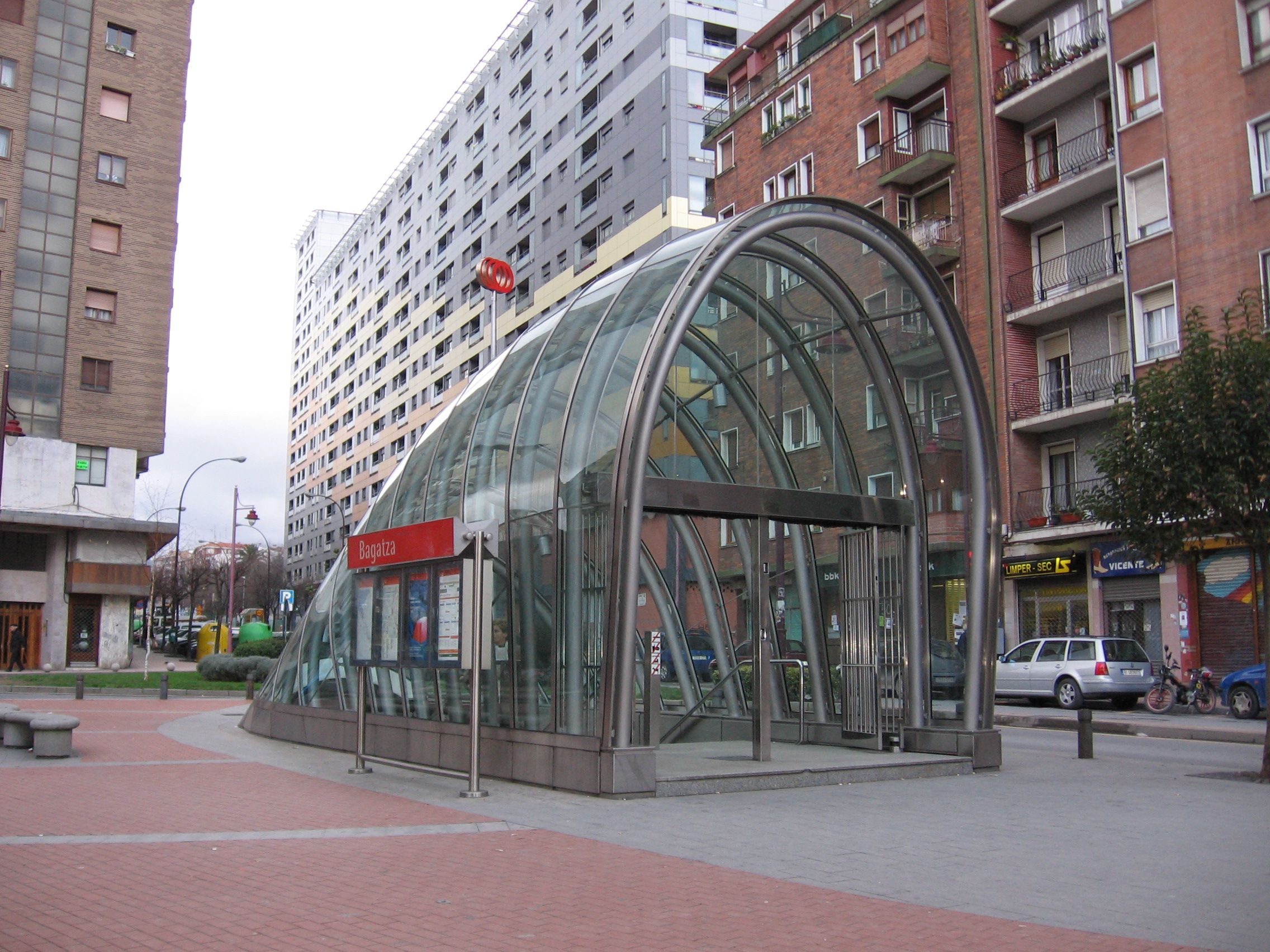
Bagatza station fosterito and signage

Sarriko station won the 1998 Brunel Award for Railway Design. It is noticeably different from the rest of the stations in the network: in place of the standard fosterito, a vast glazed atrium pours natural light into the entire station, and the long, unbroken escalator ride to the ticket hall from street level gives a dramatic sense of character to the station.

Away from the main structures, the design company Akaba created the seating systems for the Metro, which subsequently won the Spanish National Industrial Design Prize from the Ministry of Science and Technology in November 2000. A distinctive signage system was created by Otl Aicher, which are responsible for the eye-catching masts bearing the Metro logo. The principal colours used are of white lettering on a red background for key information and black lettering for secondary details. The logo and the signage use Aicher's Rotis font.

== Rolling stock ==
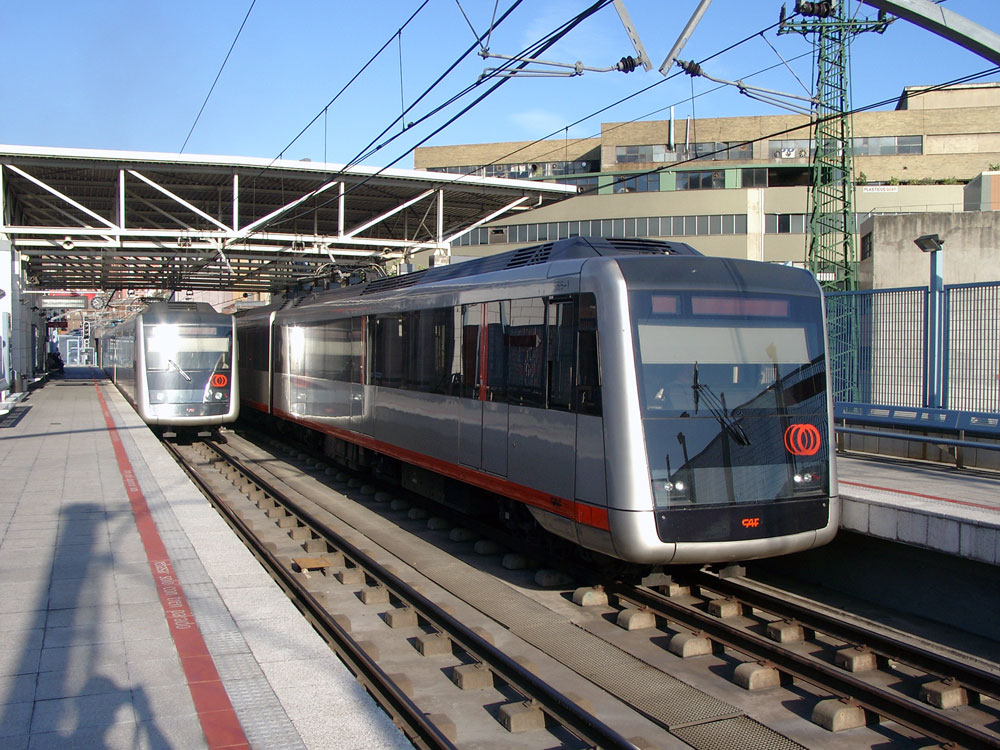
Metro units in Bolueta

=== Lines 1 and 2 ===
The Bilbao Metro uses 500, 550, and 600 series trains, built by CAF. The company uses 24 trains of the first series, 13 of the second and 9 of the third. All vehicles are maintained and parked in Sopelana and Ariz.

The first 16 vehicles, which carry the numbers UT 501 to 516, were delivered by CAF and ABB in November 1995. Inside each car 2+2 seats are arranged respectively vis-à-vis in the colors of the Corporate design – red and grey. A set of 4 cars is 72.12-metre (236 ft 7 3/8 in) long, 3.85-metre (12 ft 7 5/8 in) high and 2.80-metre (9 ft 2 1/4 in) wide. This is especially wide for a train that uses narrow gauge, for example vehicles of the large profile Berlin U-Bahn are only 2.65-meter (8 ft 8 3/8 in) wide, and they use the normal gauge of 1,435 mm (4 ft 8 1/2 in).

The Metro, like the commuter railroads in the region, is electrified at 1,500 V DC via overhead catenary. Each train has sixteen 180 kilowatt motors; together that yields 2880 kilowatts per train unit. The maximum speed is 80 km/h (50 mph). A train can carry 712 people, with 144 seated and 568 standing (based upon six passengers standing per square meter).

The number of trains was increased after a renewed order in 1996, to a total of 24 trains with the numbers UT 517 until 524. For the newly constructed Line 2, thirteen new trains were ordered from CAF and Adtranz (now parent company of ABB). These new series UT-550 trains were delivered in October 2001. This series offers improvements in energy efficiency and to the air-conditioning systems. These trains are able to climb the deep Line 2 tunnel under the river.

Since 1998 automatic train protection, and automatic train operation are used. The latter implies that the train drivers must press solely a button, and the remainder of the train operation is done through the computer. This is to be seen as an initial stage for an entirely computer-controlled system.

=== Line 3 ===
The line shares rolling stock with the rest of the Euskotren Trena network. Currently, 900 and 950 series trains are used.

== See also ==
- List of metro systems
- San Sebastián Metro
