= List of Bilbao Metro stations =

Map of the Bilbao Metro system (2025)

This is a list of the stations of the metro system of Bilbao, Basque Country, Spain. The system was inaugurated in 1995 and encompasses three metre-gauge lines; the first two lines form an isolated system, whereas Line 3 is operated jointly with the Euskotren Trena commuter railway network.

For further information on the network, see the Bilbao Metro page.

== Metro Bilbao ==
The network operated by Metro Bilbao has 42 stations; it consists of two lines operating on 45.1 kilometres (48.8 mi) of route. It has a "Y" shape, the lines span along both banks of the Estuary of Bilbao and then combine through the city centre into a common trunk route that ends in the south of Bilbao.

=== List ===
Terminal stations in bold

Station	Photo	Lines	Opened	Structure	Location	Usage (2025)	Transfer Notes
Abando	Abando	Line 1 (Bilbao Metro) Line 2 (Bilbao Metro)	11 November 1995	Underground	Abando, Bilbao	7,149,464	(at Bilbao-Abando); (at Bilbao-Concordia)
Abatxolo	Abatxolo	Line 2 (Bilbao Metro)	20 January 2007	Underground	Portugalete	828,006	
Aiboa	Aiboa	Line 1 (Bilbao Metro)	11 November 1995	At-grade	Getxo	503,357	
Algorta		Line 1 (Bilbao Metro)	11 November 1995	Underground	Getxo	2,725,968	
Ansio	Ansio	Line 2 (Bilbao Metro)	13 April 2002	Underground	Barakaldo	1,744,363	Park and ride
Areeta		Line 1 (Bilbao Metro)	11 November 1995	Underground	Getxo	3,689,054	
Ariz	Ariz	Line 2 (Bilbao Metro)	28 February 2011	Underground	Basauri	2,356,867	
Astrabudua	Astrabudua	Line 1 (Bilbao Metro)	11 November 1995	At-grade	Erandio	1,525,075	first opened as Axpe in 1887 (Ferrocarril de Bilbao a Las Arenas)
Bagatza	Bagatza	Line 2 (Bilbao Metro)	13 April 2002	Underground	Barakaldo	2,397,671	
Barakaldo	Barakaldo	Line 2 (Bilbao Metro)	13 April 2002	Underground	Barakaldo	4,020,364	
Basarrate	Basarrate	Line 1 (Bilbao Metro) Line 2 (Bilbao Metro)	5 July 1997	Underground	Begoña, Bilbao	2,472,891	
**Basauri**	Basauri	Line 2 (Bilbao Metro)	11 November 2011	Underground	Basauri	1,648,495	terminus for Line 2
Berango	Berango	Line 1 (Bilbao Metro)	11 November 1995	At-grade	Berango	611,081	first opened in 1893 (Ferrocarril de Las Arenas a Plencia)
Bidezabal	Bidezabal	Line 1 (Bilbao Metro)	11 November 1995	At-grade	Getxo	1,453,130	
Bolueta	Bolueta	Line 1 (Bilbao Metro) Line 2 (Bilbao Metro)	5 July 1997	Elevated	Begoña, Bilbao	1,775,798	Bilbao tram
Deustu	Deustu	Line 1 (Bilbao Metro) Line 2 (Bilbao Metro)	11 November 1995	Underground	Deusto, Bilbao	4,734,644	
Eliptikoa	Eliptikoa	Line 1 (Bilbao Metro) Line 2 (Bilbao Metro)	11 November 1995	Underground	Abando, Bilbao	7,175,678	
Erandio		Line 1 (Bilbao Metro)	11 November 1995	Underground	Erandio	2,090,723	
**Etxebarri**	Etxebarri	Line 1 (Bilbao Metro) Line 2 (Bilbao Metro)	8 January 2005	At-grade	Etxebarri	1,611,416	terminus for Line 1 and eastern end of the common section
Gobela	Gobela	Line 1 (Bilbao Metro)	24 June 1996	At-grade	Getxo	844,892	first opened as Gobelas in 1893 (Ferrocarril de Las Arenas a Plencia)
Gurutzeta/Cruces	Gurutzeta/Cruces	Line 2 (Bilbao Metro)	13 April 2002	Underground	Barakaldo	3,803,823	
Ibarbengoa	Ibarbengoa	Line 1 (Bilbao Metro)	15 June 2020	At-grade	Getxo	111,095	opened several years after its completion
Indautxu	Indautxu	Line 1 (Bilbao Metro) Line 2 (Bilbao Metro)	11 November 1995	Underground	Abando, Bilbao	6,615,388	
**Kabiezes**	Kabiezes	Line 2 (Bilbao Metro)	28 June 2014	Underground	Santurtzi	1,255,203	terminus for Line 2
Lamiako	Lamiako	Line 1 (Bilbao Metro)	11 November 1995	At-grade	Leioa	414,388	first opened as Axpe in 1887 (Ferrocarril de Bilbao a Las Arenas)
Larrabasterra	Larrabasterra	Line 1 (Bilbao Metro)	11 November 1995	At-grade	Sopela	621,800	first opened in 1893 (Ferrocarril de Las Arenas a Plencia)
Leioa	Leioa	Line 1 (Bilbao Metro)	11 November 1995	At-grade	Leioa	1,199,853	Park and ride
Lutxana	Lutxana	Line 1 (Bilbao Metro)	11 November 1995	At-grade	Erandio	232,616	first opened in 1887 (Ferrocarril de Bilbao a Las Arenas)
Neguri	Neguri	Line 1 (Bilbao Metro)	11 November 1995	At-grade	Getxo	790,975	first opened in 1893 (Ferrocarril de Las Arenas a Plencia)
Peñota	Peñota	Line 2 (Bilbao Metro)	4 July 2009	Underground	Portugalete	1,522,836	
**Plentzia**	Plentzia	Line 1 (Bilbao Metro)	11 November 1995	At-grade	Plentzia	840,239	terminus for Line 1; first opened in 1893 (Ferrocarril de Las Arenas a Plencia)
Portugalete	Portugalete	Line 2 (Bilbao Metro)	20 January 2007	Underground	Portugalete	2,324,652	
San Ignazio	San Ignazio	Line 1 (Bilbao Metro) Line 2 (Bilbao Metro)	11 November 1995	Underground	Deusto, Bilbao	2,582,129	western end of the common section
San Mamés	San Mamés	Line 1 (Bilbao Metro) Line 2 (Bilbao Metro)	11 November 1995	Underground	Basurto-Zorroza, Bilbao	7,818,706	Bilbao Intermodal bus station
Santurtzi	Santurtzi	Line 2 (Bilbao Metro)	4 July 2009	Underground	Santurtzi	2,753,377	An fourth station entrance to Mamariga opened in 2010. It serves about one-fifth of its users.
Santutxu	Santutxu	Line 1 (Bilbao Metro) Line 2 (Bilbao Metro)	5 July 1997	Underground	Begoña, Bilbao	4,827,737	
Sarriko	Sarriko	Line 1 (Bilbao Metro) Line 2 (Bilbao Metro)	11 November 1995	Underground	Deusto, Bilbao	2,784,041	
Sestao	Sestao	Line 2 (Bilbao Metro)	8 January 2005	Underground	Sestao	2,794,081	
Sopela	Sopela	Line 1 (Bilbao Metro)	11 November 1995	At-grade	Sopela	719,627	formerly Sopelana (until 2014); first opened in 1893 (Ferrocarril de Las Arenas a Plencia)
Urbinaga	Urbinaga	Line 2 (Bilbao Metro)	13 April 2002	Elevated	Sestao	142,736	
Urduliz	Urduliz	Line 1 (Bilbao Metro)	10 April 2017	Underground	Urduliz	602,726	built to replace the former Urduliz at‑grade station (on Line 1 from 1995's launch)
Zazpikaleak/Casco Viejo	Zazpikaleak/Casco Viejo	Line 1 (Bilbao Metro) Line 2 (Bilbao Metro)	11 November 1995	Underground	Ibaiondo, Bilbao	8,391,236	Euskotren Trena

== Euskotren ==
The network operated by Euskotren has 7 stations; it consists of one line operating on 5.9 kilometres (3.7 mi) of route. The line runs along the east bank of the Estuary of Bilbao through the city centre of Bilbao.

=== List ===
Terminal stations in bold

Station	Photo	Lines	Opened	Structure	Location	Usage	Transfer Notes
**Kukullaga**	Kukillaga	Line 3 (Bilbao Metro)	8 April 2017	At-grade	Etxebarri		
**Matiko**	Matiko	Line 3 (Bilbao Metro)	8 April 2017	Underground	Uribarri, Bilbao		
Otxarkoaga	Otxarkoaga	Line 3 (Bilbao Metro)	8 April 2017	Underground	Otxarkoaga-Txurdinaga, Bilbao		
Txurdinaga	Txurdinaga	Line 3 (Bilbao Metro)	8 April 2017	Underground	Otxarkoaga-Txurdinaga, Bilbao		
Uribarri	Zurbaranbarri	Line 3 (Bilbao Metro)	8 April 2017	Underground	Uribarri, Bilbao		
Zazpikaleak/Casco Viejo	Zazpikaleak/Casco Viejo	Line 3 (Bilbao Metro)	8 April 2017	Underground	Ibaiondo, Bilbao		Line 1 (Bilbao Metro) Line 2 (Bilbao Metro)
Zurbaranbarri	Zurbaranbarri	Line 3 (Bilbao Metro)	8 April 2017	Underground	Uribarri, Bilbao		

== Stations by lines ==
=== Line 1 ===
Plentzia–Etxebarri ( San Ignazio–Etxebarri common section with )

Line 1

- **Plentzia**
- Urduliz
- Sopela
- Larrabasterra
- Berango
- Ibarbengoa
- Bidezabal
- Algorta
- Aiboa
- Neguri
- Gobela

- Areeta
- Lamiako
- Leioa
- Astrabudua
- Erandio
- Lutxana
- San Ignazio
- Sarriko
- Deustu
- San Mamés
- Indautxu
- Eliptikoa
- Abando
- Zazpikaleak/Casco Viejo
- Santutxu
- Basarrate
- Bolueta
- **Etxebarri**

=== Line 2 ===
Kabiezes–Basauri ( San Ignazio–Etxebarri common section with )

Line 2

- **Kabiezes**
- Santurtzi
- Peñota
- Portugalete
- Abatxolo
- Sestao
- Urbinaga
- Bagatza
- Barakaldo
- Ansio
- Guruzeta/Cruces

- San Ignazio
- Sarriko
- Deustu
- San Mamés
- Indautxu
- Eliptikoa
- Abando
- Zazpikaleak/Casco Viejo
- Santutxu
- Basarrate
- Bolueta
- Etxebarri
- Ariz
- **Basauri**

=== Line 3 ===
Line 3

Matiko–Kukullaga

- Matiko
- Uribarri
- Zazpikaleak/Casco Viejo
- Zurbaranbarri
- Txurdinaga
- Otxarkoaga
- Kukullaga
