= Gurutzeta/Cruces (Bilbao Metro) =

Rapid transit station in Barakaldo, Basque Country, Spain

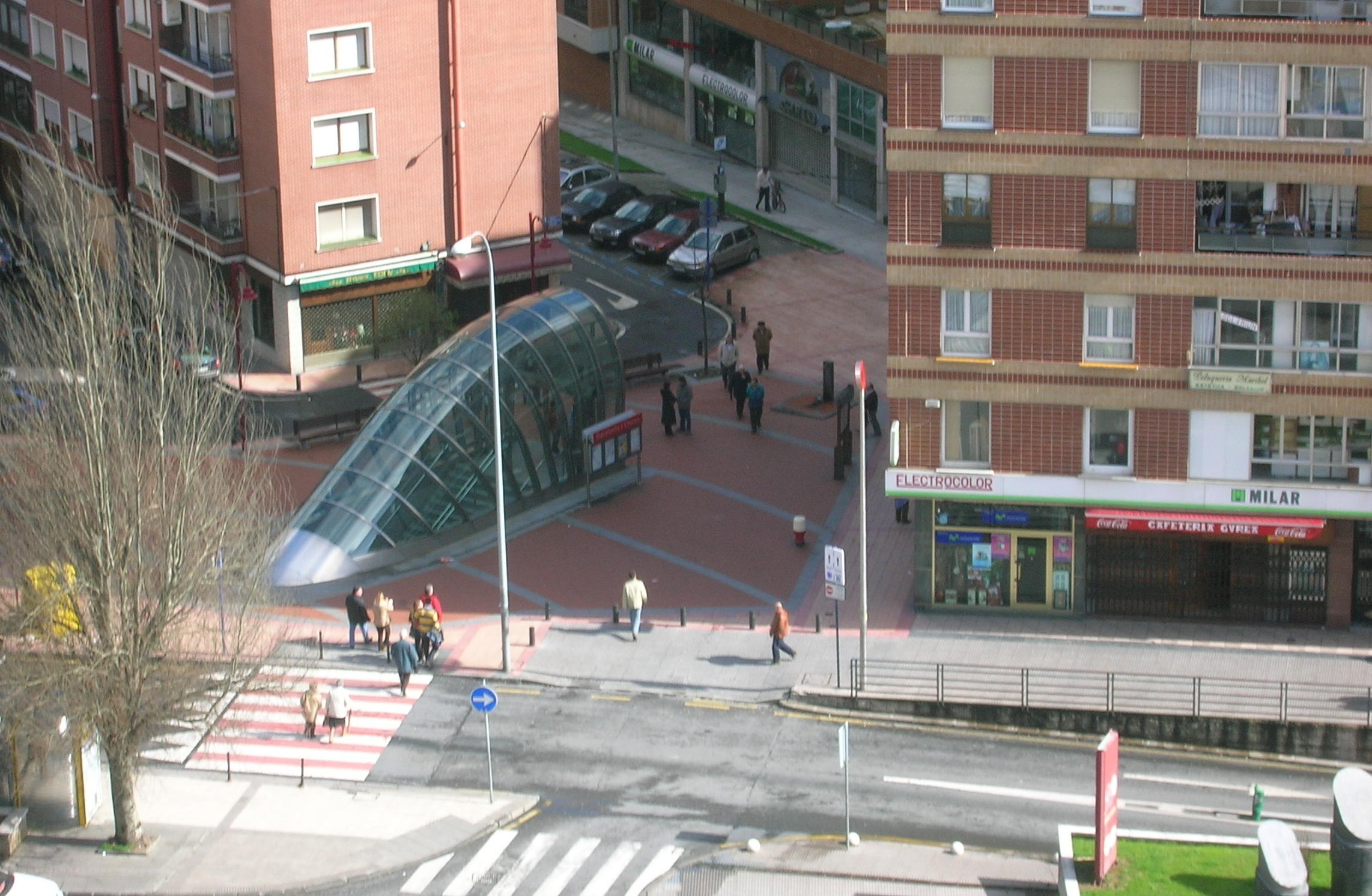
- Entrance to the station

General information
- Location: 4 Balejo St. 48903 Barakaldo; Spain
- Coordinates: 43°16′56″N 2°58′58″W
- Owner: Biscay Transport Consortium; Euskal Trenbide Sarea
- Line: Line 2
- Platforms: 2 side platforms
- Tracks: 2

Construction
- Structure type: Underground
- Platform levels: 1
- Parking: No
- Accessible: Yes

Other information
- Fare zone: Zone 2

History
- Opened: 13 April 2002

Passengers
- 2021: 2,640,901

Services
Preceding station	Metro Bilbao	Following station
Ansio towards Kabiezes	Line 2	San Ignazio towards Basauri
Location

Gurutzeta/Cruces is a station on Line 2 of the Bilbao Metro. It is located in the neighborhood of Gurutzeta, in the municipality of Barakaldo. The station is located in near proximity to the University Hospital of Gurutzeta (also known as Hospital de Cruces in Spanish), the largest public healthcare facility in the Basque Country. The station was opened on 13 April 2002, as part of the opening of line 2.

The trip from San Ignazio to Gurutzeta/Cruces takes four minutes, making it the longest interval between underground stations throughout the entire Bilbao Metro network. It is one of four stations located in Barakaldo, the others being Ansio, Bagatza and Barakaldo.

== Station layout ==
Gurutzeta/Cruces station follows the typical cavern-shaped layout of most underground Metro Bilbao stations designed by Norman Foster, with the main hall located directly above the rail tracks.

=== Access ===
- Gurutzeta - Hospital (Gurutzeta/Cruces exit)
- Llano St. (Llano exit, closed during night time services)
- Balejo St.

== Services ==
The station is served by Line 2 from Basauri to Kabiezes. The station is also served by Bizkaibus regional bus services.
