= Ansio (Bilbao Metro) =

Rapid transit station in Barakaldo, Basque Country, Spain

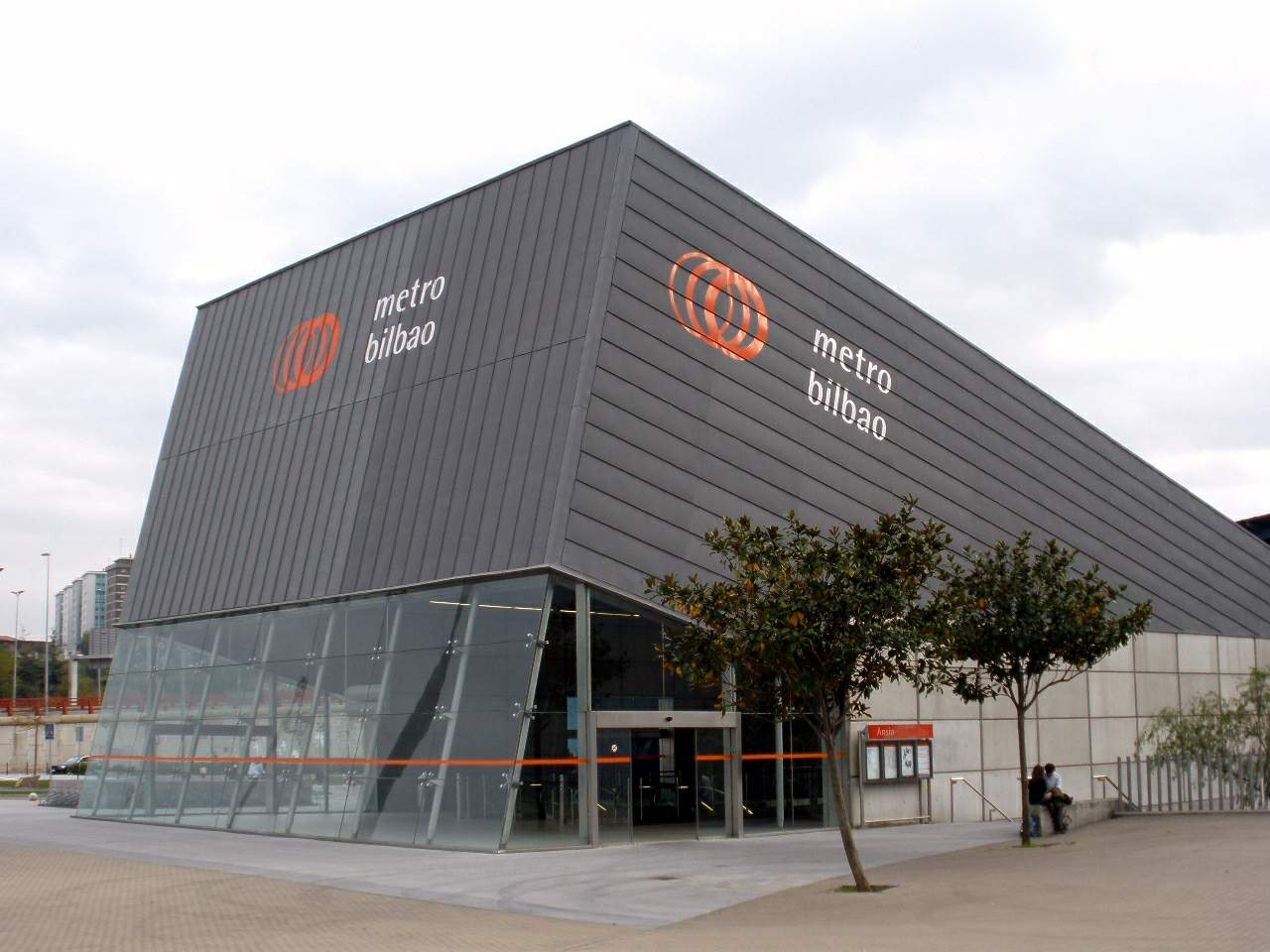
- Entrance to the station

General information
- Location: 16 Alameda Serralta; 48903 Barakaldo; Spain
- Coordinates: 43°17′22″N 2°59′14″W
- Owner: Biscay Transport Consortium; Euskal Trenbide Sarea
- Line: Line 2
- Platforms: 2 side platforms
- Tracks: 2

Construction
- Structure type: Underground
- Platform levels: 1
- Parking: Yes
- Accessible: Yes

Other information
- Fare zone: Zone 2

History
- Opened: 13 April 2002

Passengers
- 2021: 1,131,518

Services
Preceding station	Metro Bilbao	Following station
Barakaldo towards Kabiezes	Line 2	Gurutzeta/Cruces towards Basauri
Location

Ansio is a station on Line 2 of the Bilbao Metro. It is located in the neighborhood of Arteagabeitia-Zuazu, in the municipality of Barakaldo. The station is located next to the main entrance to the Bilbao Exhibition Centre (BEC). The main Customer Attention Offices for line 2 are also located in this station. It opened on 13 April 2002.

== Station layout ==
Unlike other underground stations in the network, and similarly to Sarriko station, the station does not follow a cavern-like design, but it is instead made up of a big single space, with a big shelter that allows sunlight in.

=== Access ===
- Ansio St. (BEC exit)
- Station's interior (BEC exit)
- BEC Parking
- BEC Park & Ride

== Services ==
The station is served by Line 2 from Basauri to Kabiezes. The station is also served by Bizkaibus regional bus services and Kbus, the municipal bus service.
