= San Ignazio (Bilbao Metro) =

Rapid transit station in Bilbao, Basque Country, Spain

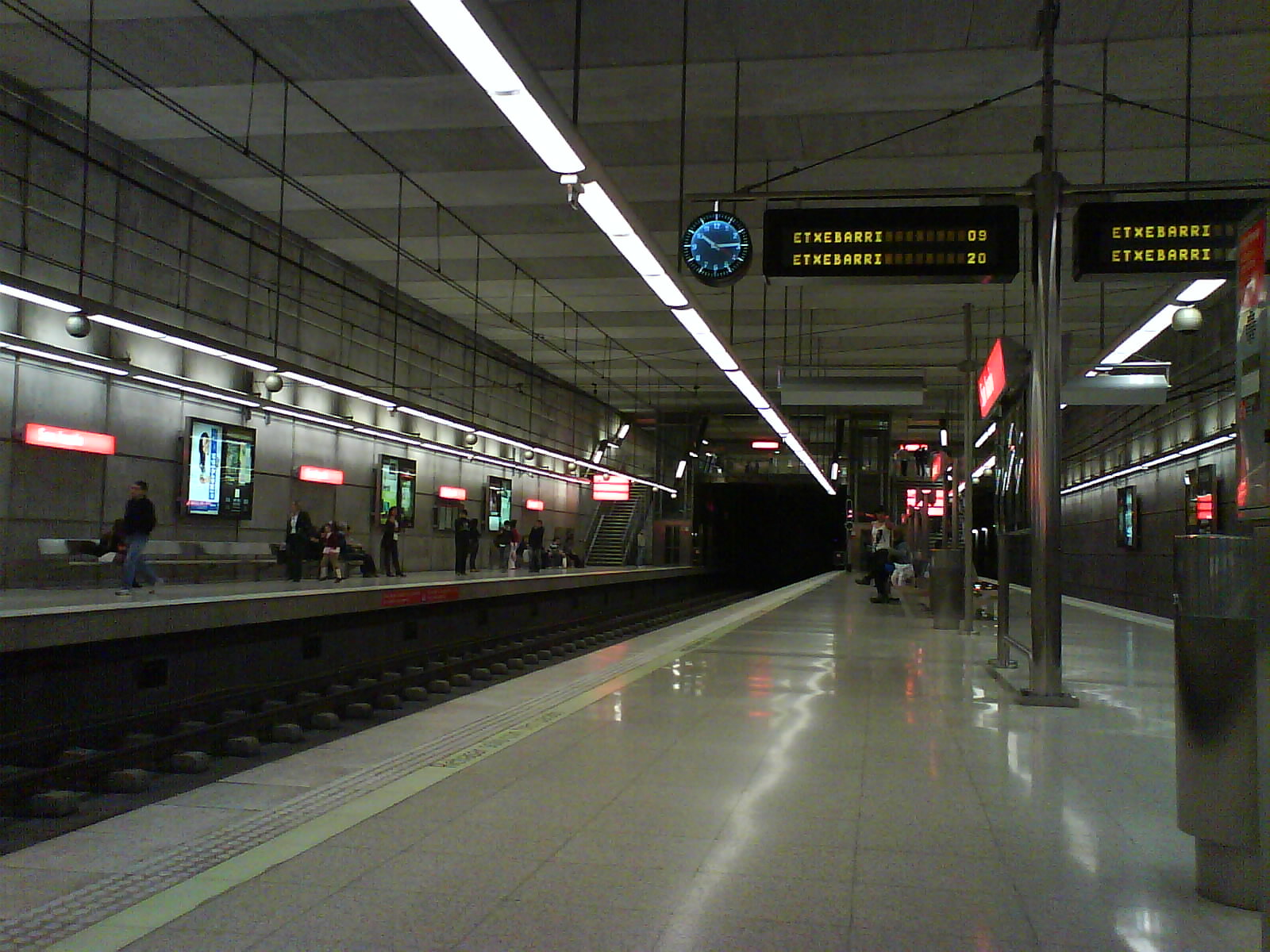
- View of the platforms

General information
- Location: 168 Lehendakari Agirre St. 48015 Bilbao; Spain
- Coordinates: 43°16′51″N 2°57′45″W
- Owner: Biscay Transport Consortium; Euskal Trenbide Sarea
- Lines: Line 1; Line 2
- Platforms: 1 side platform, 1 island platform
- Tracks: 3
- Connections: Bus

Construction
- Structure type: Underground
- Platform levels: 1
- Parking: No
- Accessible: Yes

Other information
- Fare zone: Zone 1

History
- Opened: 11 November 1995

Passengers
- 2021: 1,762,300

Services
Preceding station	Metro Bilbao	Following station
Lutxana towards Plentzia	Line 1	Sarriko towards Etxebarri
Gurutzeta/Cruces towards Kabiezes	Line 2	Sarriko towards Basauri
Location

San Ignazio (until 2017, San Inazio) is a station on Lines 1 and 2 of the Bilbao Metro. It is located in the San Ignazio-Elorrieta neighbourhood, part of the Deusto district. The station is near the San Ignazio Sports Center and the Elorrieta football field. It was opened on 11 November 1995.

== Station layout ==
San Ignazio is the only one of the underground stations in the metro to have three tracks and an island platform. The station is bigger due to it being the last of the shared section between lines 1 and 2 northbound, with each line splitting into a different tunnel after the station. Also, unlike the other underground stations within the city, it does not have the typical cavern-shaped layout. It was designed by Norman Foster.

=== Access ===
- 162 Lehendakari Agirre St. (Lekeitio exit, closed during night time services)
- 167 Lehendakari Agirre St. (Benita Asas exit, closed during night time services)
- 179 Lehendakari Agirre St. (Asturias exit)
- 2 Levante Plaza (Levante exit)
- 170 Lehendakari Agirre St. (Levante exit)

== Services ==
The station is served by Line 1 from Etxebarri to Ibarbengoa and Plentzia, and by Line 2 from Basauri to Kabiezes. The station is also served by local Bilbobus and regional Bizkaibus bus services.
