= Bolueta (Bilbao Metro) =

Rapid transit station in Basque Country, Spain

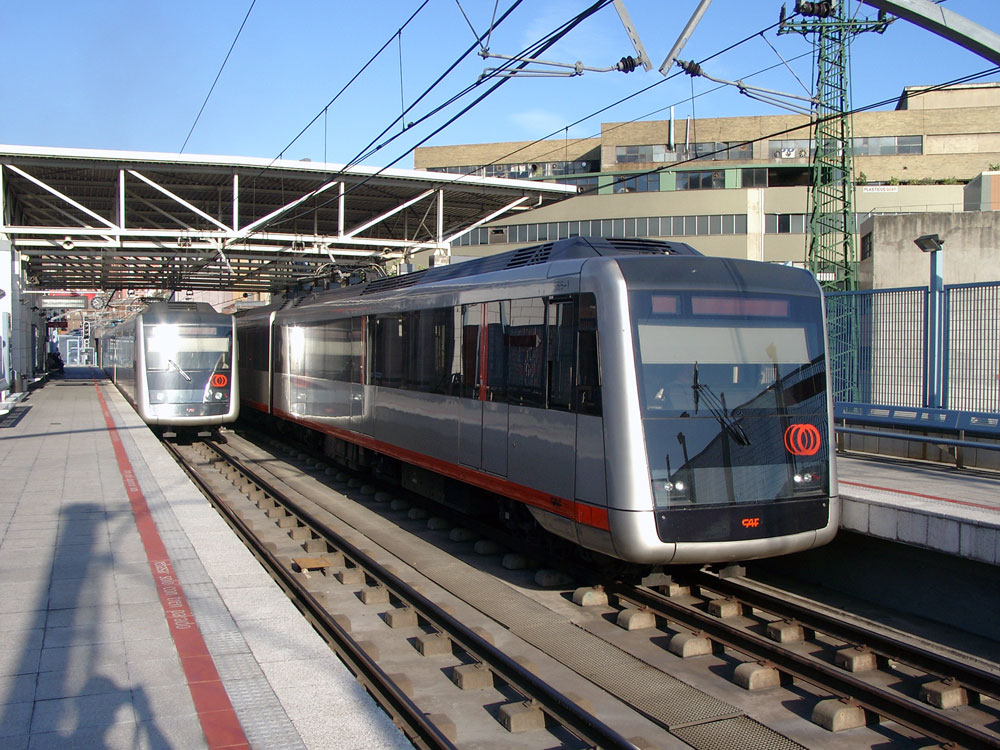
- Two metro units at Bolueta

General information
- Location: Camino Ibarsusi, 2A; 48004 Bilbao; Spain
- Coordinates: 43.2470°N 2.9058°W
- Owner: Biscay Transport Consortium; Euskal Trenbide Sarea
- Lines: Line 1; Line 2; Bilbao tram
- Platforms: 4 side platforms
- Tracks: 4
- Connections: Bus

Construction
- Structure type: Elevated
- Platform levels: 2
- Parking: No
- Accessible: yes

Other information
- Fare zone: Zone 1

History
- Opened: 5 July 1997

Passengers
- 2021: 996,099
Location

Bolueta is a station on Lines 1 and 2 of the Bilbao Metro. The station is located in the neighborhood of the same name, in the district of Begoña. It opened on 5 July 1997.

Until 2019, it was also served by suburban Euskotren Trena trains coming from Durango, Bermeo and San Sebastián. Between 2017 and 2019, these lines were diverted through Line 3 of the metro, completely bypassing Bolueta. In 2022, the Bilbao tram reached Bolueta along the disused railway corridor.

== Station layout ==
Bolueta is an elevated station, with two platforms located above a main entry hall. The station can be accessed from Otxarkoaga and Ibarsusi streets. In 2012, a new access was opened from Telleria street, including an elevator for people with restricted mobility.

=== Access ===
- Otxarkoaga Rd.
- Ibarsusi Rd., 1
- Santa Ana, Telleria St., 1 (access only to metro platforms)
- Station main hall, includes elevators to Euskotren Trena platforms

== History ==
When the station opened in 1997, the station served as the only connection between the Bilbao Metro network and the Euskotren Trena lines to the cities of Bermeo, Durango, Eibar and San Sebastián. All the Euskotren Trena lines that had Bilbao-Atxuri station as a terminus stopped at Bolueta. After the opening of Line 3 of the metro, operated by Euskotren, the trains coming from all destinations except Bermeo were rerouted through the new underground route that connects directly with Zazpikaleak/Casco Viejo station in central Bilbao, bypassing Bolueta and Atxuri stations completely. The Urdaibai line was rerouted through line 3 in September, 2019, thus leaving the Eusoktren station without service.

The Basque Government and the administrator of the rail network, Euskal Trenbide Sarea (ETS), announced in 2003 their intention of transforming the rail corridor between Bilbao-Atxuri, Bolueta and Etxebarri into a tramway line, thus continuing the existing Bilbao tramway service which at the time had its terminus at Bilbao-Atxuri, however the project wasn't carried out. In 2017, after the opening of line 3, the plan was brought back by the administration and some studies were conducted In November, 2018, it was announced by the Basque Government that the works to transform the lower level of Bolueta station into a tram stop while maintaining the connection with Metro Bilbao would start in 2019. The tram extension to Bolueta along the disused railway corridor opened in March 2022.

== Services ==
The station is served by Line 1 from Etxebarri to Ibarbengoa and Plentzia, and by Line 2 from Basauri to Kabiezes. It is also the eastern terminus of the Bilbao tram. Close to the station there are bus stops served by Bilbobus line 30 running to Begoña, Abando and Ibaiondo as well as several Bizkaibus lines running to Galdakao and Leioa (A2610), Ugao-Miraballes (A3613), Basauri and Zaratamo (A3622) and Artea (A3928).

Preceding station	Metro Bilbao	Following station
Basarrate towards Plentzia	Line 1	Etxebarri Terminus
Basarrate towards Kabiezes	Line 2	Etxebarri towards Basauri
Preceding station	Euskotren Tranbia	Following station
Abusu towards La Casilla	Bilbao tram	Terminus
