= Urbinaga (Bilbao Metro) =

Rapid transit station in Sestao, Basque Country, Spain

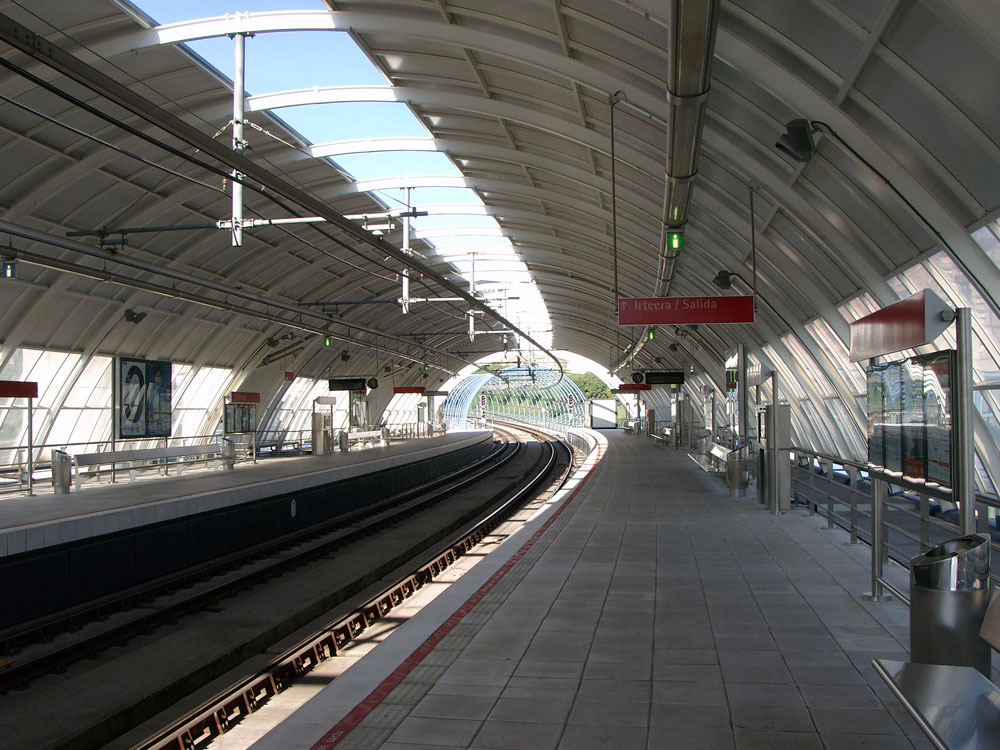
- Platforms

General information
- Location: Maestro José St. 48910 Sestao; Spain
- Coordinates: 43°18′20″N 2°59′33″W
- Owner: Biscay Transport Consortium; Euskal Trenbide Sarea
- Line: Line 2
- Platforms: 2 side platforms
- Tracks: 2

Construction
- Structure type: Elevated
- Platform levels: 1
- Parking: Yes
- Accessible: Yes

Other information
- Fare zone: Zone 2

History
- Opened: 13 April 2002

Passengers
- 2021: 88,193

Services
Preceding station	Metro Bilbao	Following station
Sestao towards Kabiezes	Line 2	Bagatza towards Basauri
Location

Urbinaga is a station on Line 2 of the Bilbao Metro. It is located in the neighborhood of Simondrogas, in the municipality of Sestao, next to the Sestao water treatment plant and in proximity to the Lasesarre football stadium. It was opened on 13 April 2002.

== History ==
The location of the station, next to a large water treatment plant and on a relatively sparsely populated area, was chosen due to its strategic position within the Metro Bilbao network, being the only point apart from Bilbao-Abando railway station and San Mamés station where the metro tracks are in very close proximity to those of Cercanías Bilbao, a commuter rail service serving the left bank of the Bilbao estuary: the tracks from Cercanías C-1 and C-2 lines are located directly below the station.

The project of construction an interchange station between the metro and Cercanías at Urbinaga was first announced in 2009, with an agreement for its construction signed between Adif and the Biscay Transport Consortium in 2011. The project was to be executed in phases, with the first one expected to begin in autumn of 2011 involving the setting of new railway tracks for Cercanías and the construction of a new station for the service, linking it to the existing metro station. However, the project was delayed and it was not until 2017 when the Ministry of Environment published the environmental impact report, giving green light to the construction of the project. As of June 2022, construction has not yet started.

== Station layout ==
Urbinaga station is an elevated station located entirely on a curved viaduct, due to the necessity of adapting to the difficult orography of the area. The station's hall and main entrance are located on the ground floor, with two tracks and platforms on the elevated portion of the station.

=== Access ===
- Maestro José St.
- Maestro José St.

== Services ==
The station is served by Line 2 from Basauri to Kabiezes. The station is also served by Bizkaibus regional bus services.
