= Peñota (Bilbao Metro) =

Rapid transit station in Portugalete, Basque Country, Spain

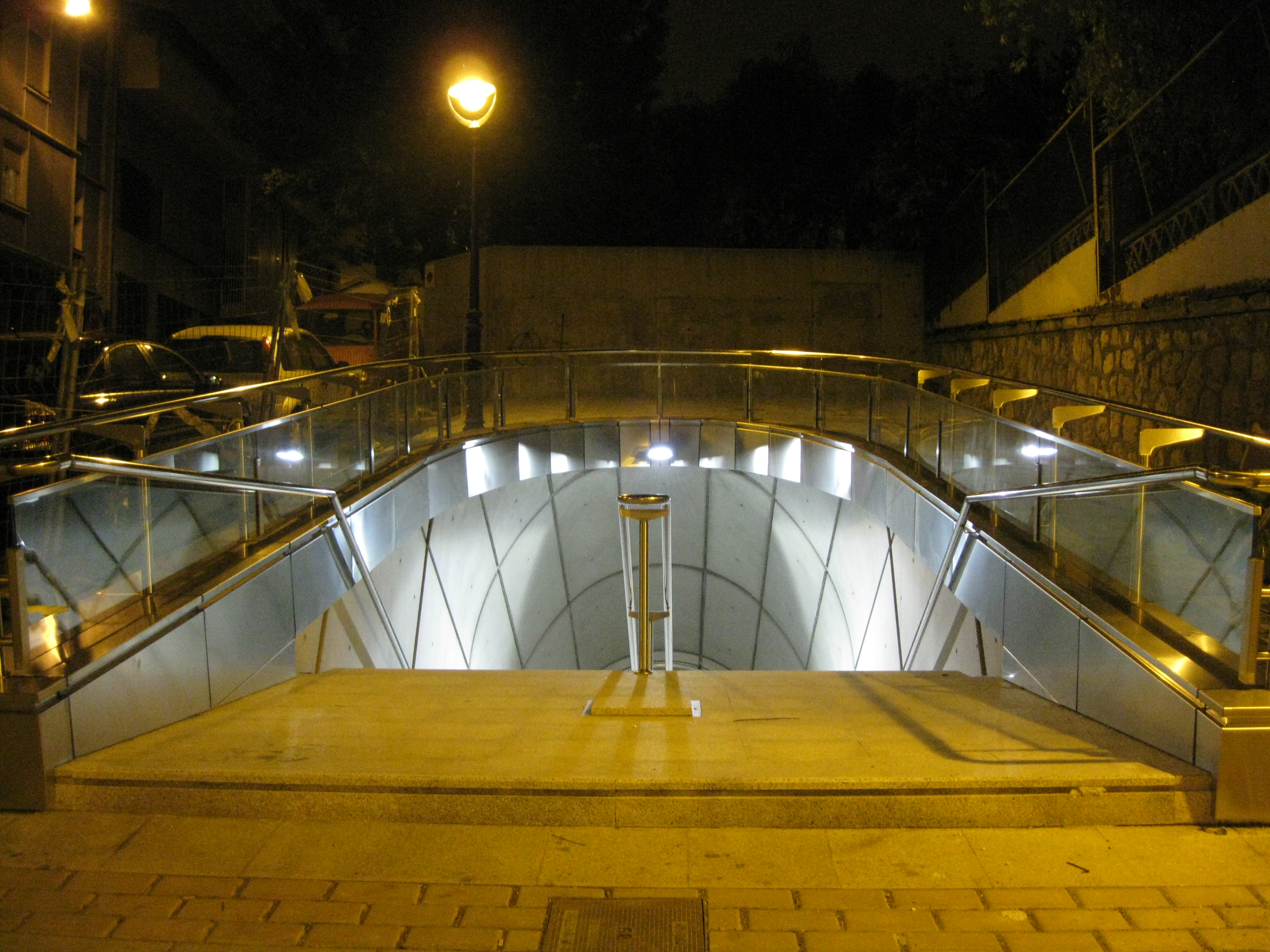
- Entrance to the station

General information
- Location: 5 San Juan Bautista St, Portugalete; Spain
- Coordinates: 43°19′19″N 3°01′29″W
- Owner: Biscay Transport Consortium; Euskal Trenbide Sarea
- Line: Line 2
- Platforms: 2 side platforms
- Tracks: 2

Construction
- Structure type: Underground
- Platform levels: 1
- Parking: No
- Accessible: Yes

Other information
- Fare zone: Zone 2

History
- Opened: 4 July 2009

Passengers
- 2021: 981,039

Services
Preceding station	Metro Bilbao	Following station
Santurtzi towards Kabiezes	Line 2	Portugalete towards Basauri
Location

Peñota is a station on Line 2 of the Bilbao Metro. It is named after the neighborhood of Peñota, in the municipality of Santurtzi, however all the station entrances are within the Portugalete city limits. It opened on 4 July 2009.

There is a station on the Cercanías Bilbao commuter railway network with the same name, but the two stations are not connected.

== Station layout ==
Peñota station follows the typical cavern-shaped layout of most underground Metro Bilbao stations designed by Norman Foster, with the main hall located directly above the rail tracks. Alongside Indautxu, Peñota is one of the few stations in the network to incorporate an underground commercial gallery.

=== Access ===
- Libertador Simón Bolívar Av. (Simón Bolívar exit, closed during night time services)
- Peñota Av. (San Juan de Dios exit, commercial gallery)
- San Juan Bautista St. (San Juan Bautista exit)

== Services ==
The station is served by Line 2 from Kabiezes to Basauri with headways from five to ten minutes. Bus stops near the station are served by Bizkaibus regional services.
