= Portugalete (Bilbao Metro) =

Rapid transit station in Portugalete, Basque Country, Spain

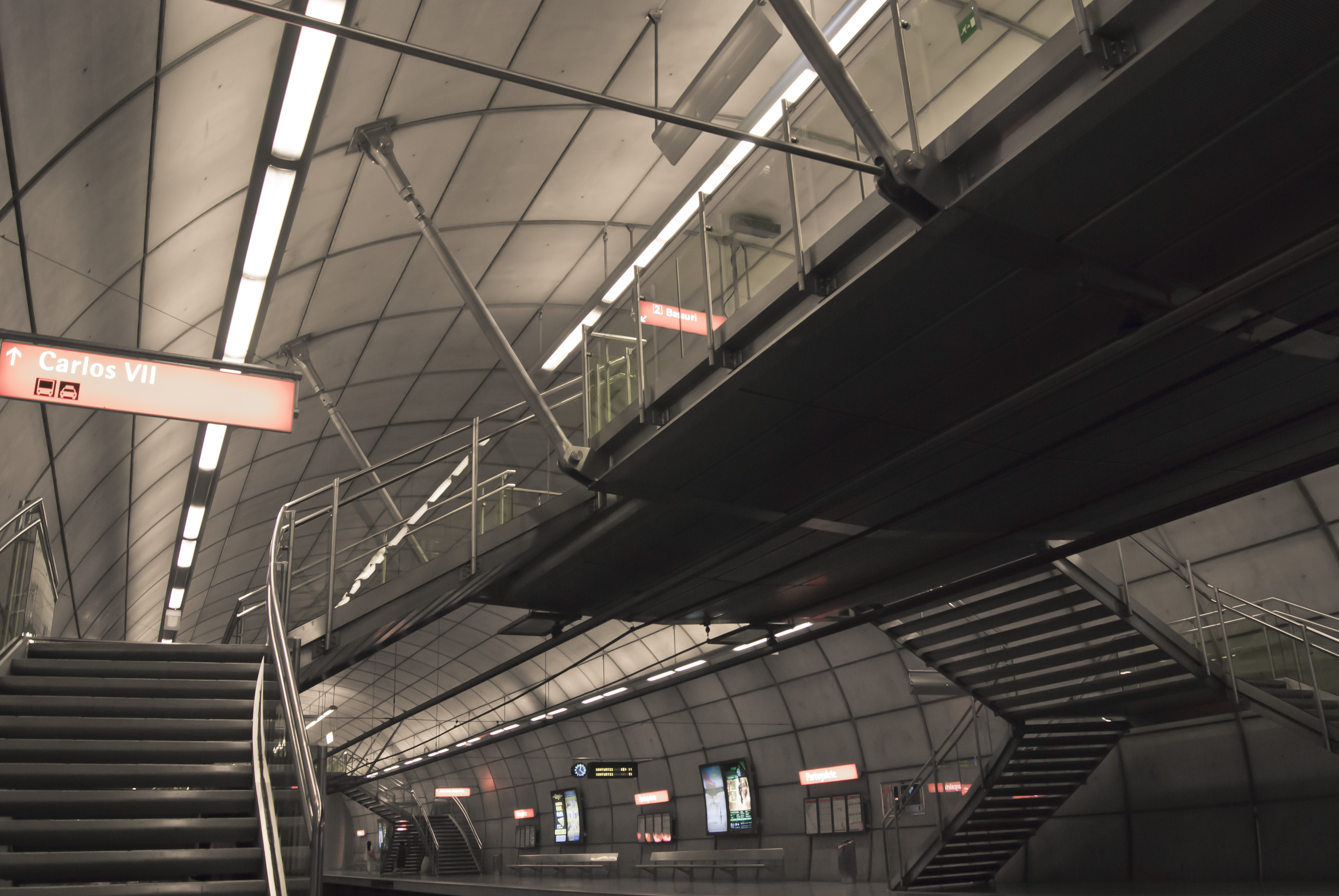
- View of the station

General information
- Location: San Roque Plaza; 48920 Portugalete; Spain
- Coordinates: 43°19′04″N 3°01′14″W
- Owner: Biscay Transport Consortium; Euskal Trenbide Sarea
- Line: Line 2
- Platforms: 2 side platforms
- Tracks: 2

Construction
- Structure type: Underground
- Platform levels: 1
- Parking: No
- Accessible: Yes

Other information
- Fare zone: Zone 2

History
- Opened: 20 January 2007

Passengers
- 2018: 1,501,249

Services
Preceding station	Metro Bilbao	Following station
Peñota towards Kabiezes	Line 2	Abatxolo towards Basauri
Location

Portugalete is a station on Line 2 of the Bilbao Metro. It is located in central Portugalete. Opening on 20 January 2007, it acted as the northern terminus of the line until the line was extended to Santurtzi.

There is a station on the Cercanías Bilbao commuter railway network with the same name, but the two stations are not connected.

== Station layout ==
Portugalete station follows the typical cavern-shaped layout of most underground Metro Bilbao stations designed by Norman Foster, with the main hall located directly above the rail tracks.

=== Access ===
- 19 Carlos VII Av. (Carlos VII exit)
- 22 Maestro Zubeldia St. (Maestro Zubeldia exit, closed during night time services)
- Ferdinand Arnodin St.

== Services ==
The station is served by Line 2 from Basauri to Kabiezes. The station is also served by Bizkaibus regional bus services.
