= Sestao (Bilbao Metro) =

Rapid transit station in Sestao, Basque Country, Spain

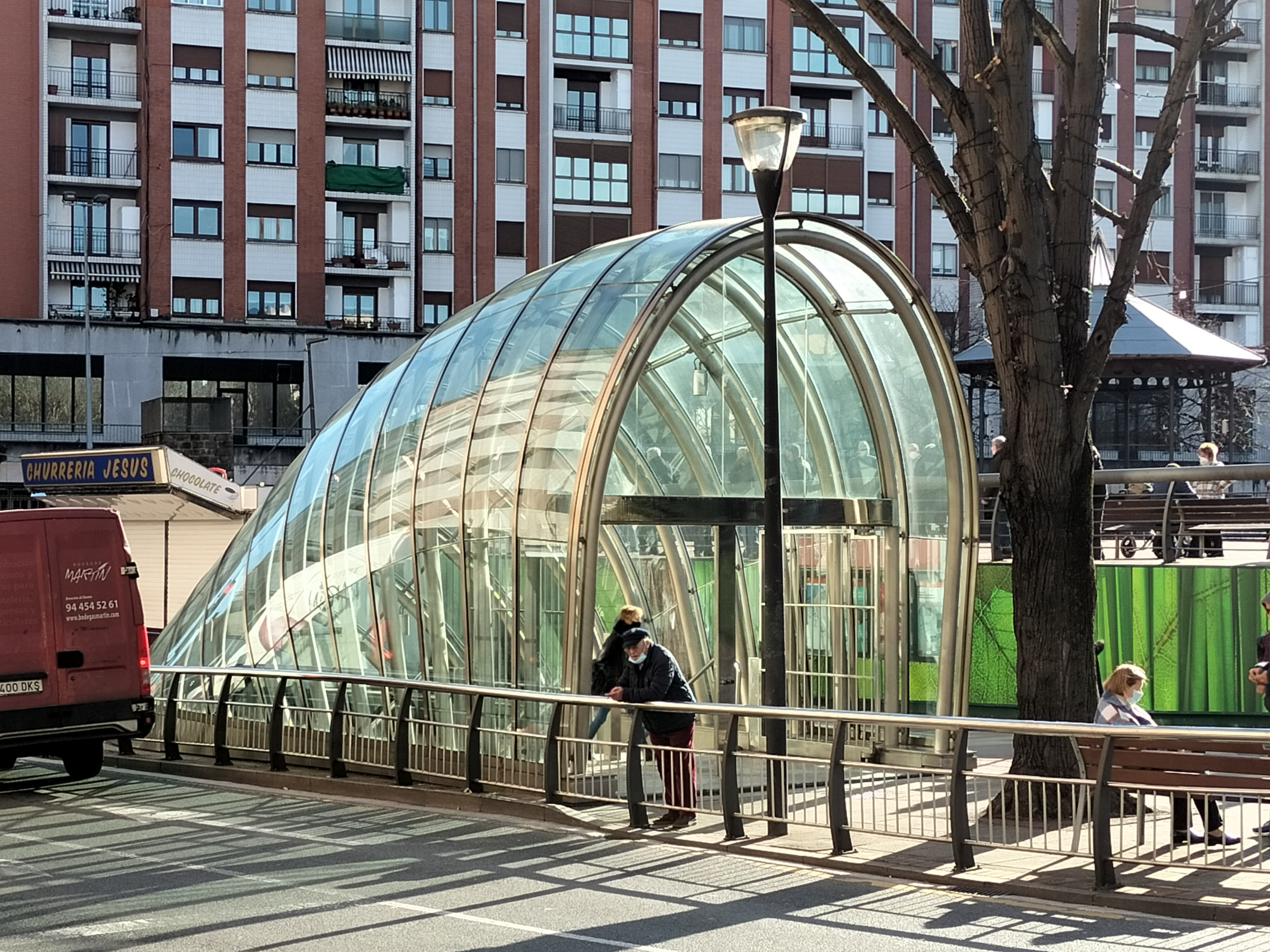
- Entrance to the station

General information
- Location: Kasko Plaza; 48910 Sestao; Spain
- Coordinates: 43°18′34″N 3°00′26″W
- Owner: Biscay Transport Consortium; Euskal Trenbide Sarea
- Line: Line 2
- Platforms: 2 side platforms
- Tracks: 2

Construction
- Structure type: Underground
- Platform levels: 1
- Parking: No
- Accessible: Yes

Other information
- Fare zone: Zone 2

History
- Opened: 8 January 2005

Passengers
- 2021: 1,799,857

Services
Preceding station	Metro Bilbao	Following station
Abatxolo towards Kabiezes	Line 2	Urbinaga towards Basauri
Location

Sestao is a station on Line 2 of the Bilbao Metro. It is located in central Sestao, near the city hall and the Santa María church. It opened on 8 January 2005 and it acted as northern terminus for line 2 until the opening of the Portugalete extension in 2007.

There is a station on the Cercanías Bilbao commuter railway network with the same name, but the two stations are not connected.

== Station layout ==
Sestao station follows the typical cavern-shaped layout of most underground Metro Bilbao stations designed by Norman Foster, with the main hall located directly above the rail tracks.

=== Access ===
- Kasko Plaza, city hall (Kasko exit)
- 14, Gran Vía de José Antonio Agirre y Lekube (La Salle exit, closed during night time services)
- Camino Txikito Rd. / Doctor Fleming St. (Camino Txikito Bidea exit, closed during night time services)
- 2, Gran Vía de José Antonio Agirre y Lekube (Kasko exit)

== Services ==
The station is served by Line 2 from Basauri to Kabiezes. The station is also served by Bizkaibus regional bus services.

=== Future ===
In 2022, it was announced that a tunnel will connect both banks of the Ibaizabal-Nervión estuary in 2028, incorporating a shuttle train that will connect the Sestao and Areeta (Line 1) stations in four minutes. Work on the tunnel is scheduled to begin in the summer of 2024, with a planned investment of 450 million euros.
