= Abatxolo (Bilbao Metro) =

Rapid transit station in Portugalete, Basque Country, Spain

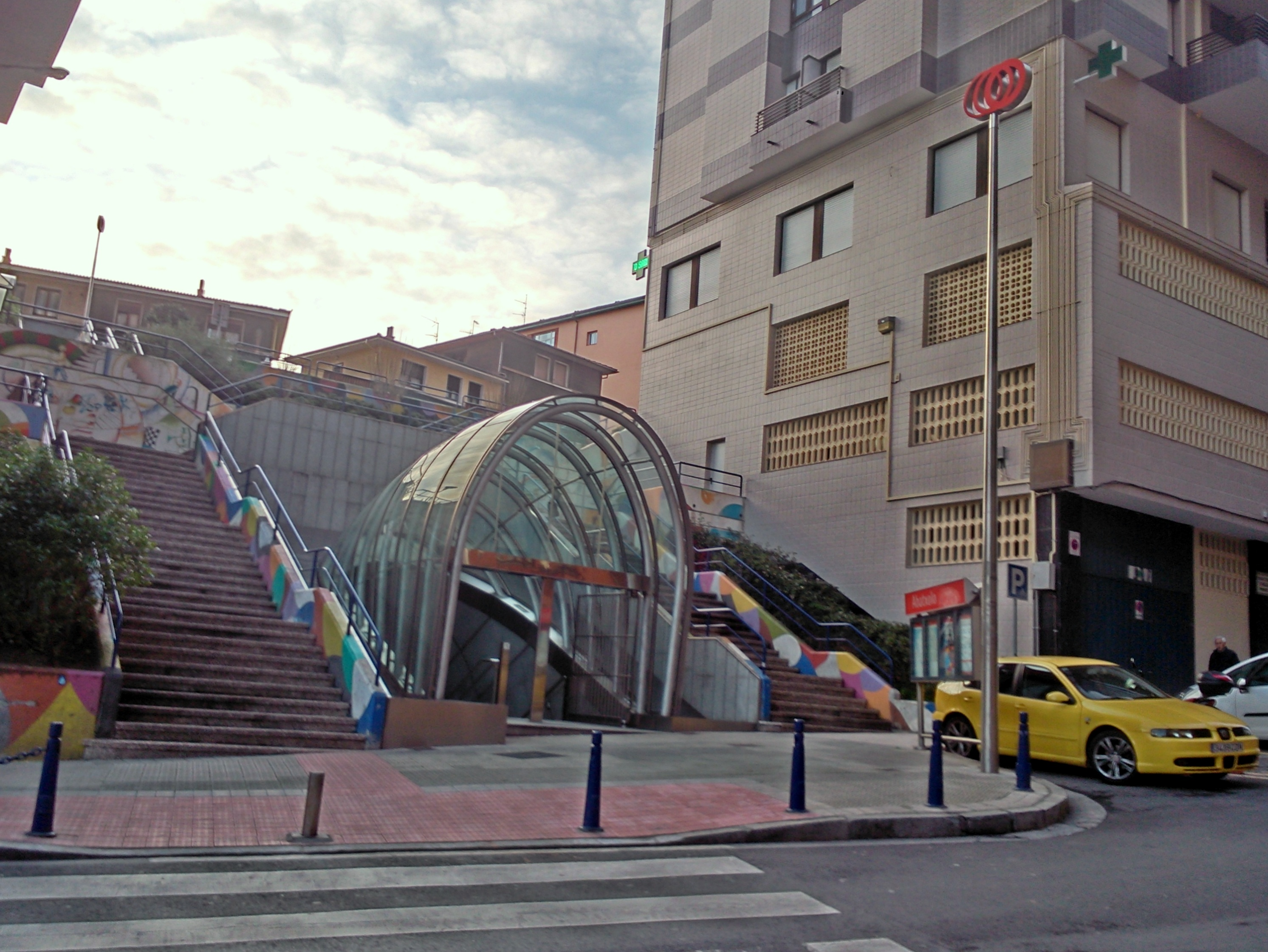
- Entrance to the station

General information
- Location: 23 Abatxolo St. 48920 Portugalete; Spain
- Coordinates: 43°18′50″N 3°00′45″W
- Owner: Biscay Transport Consortium; Euskal Trenbide Sarea
- Line: Line 2
- Platforms: 2 side platforms
- Tracks: 2

Construction
- Structure type: Underground
- Platform levels: 1
- Parking: No
- Accessible: Yes

Other information
- Fare zone: Zone 2

History
- Opened: 20 January 2007

Passengers
- 2021: 552,517

Services
Preceding station	Metro Bilbao	Following station
Portugalete towards Kabiezes	Line 2	Sestao towards Basauri
Location

Abatxolo is a station on Line 2 of the Bilbao Metro. It is located in the neighborhood of Azeta, in the municipality of Portugalete. It opened on 20 January 2007.

== Station layout ==
Abatxolo station follows the typical cavern-shaped layout of most underground Metro Bilbao stations designed by Norman Foster, with the main hall located directly above the rail tracks.

=== Access ===
- 9 Los Palangreros St. (Los Palangreros exit)
- 2 Azeta St. (Azeta exit, closed during night time services)
- 36 Abatxolo St.

== Services ==
The station is served by Line 2 from Basauri to Kabiezes.
