= Bagatza (Bilbao Metro) =

Rapid transit station in Barakaldo, Basque Country, Spain

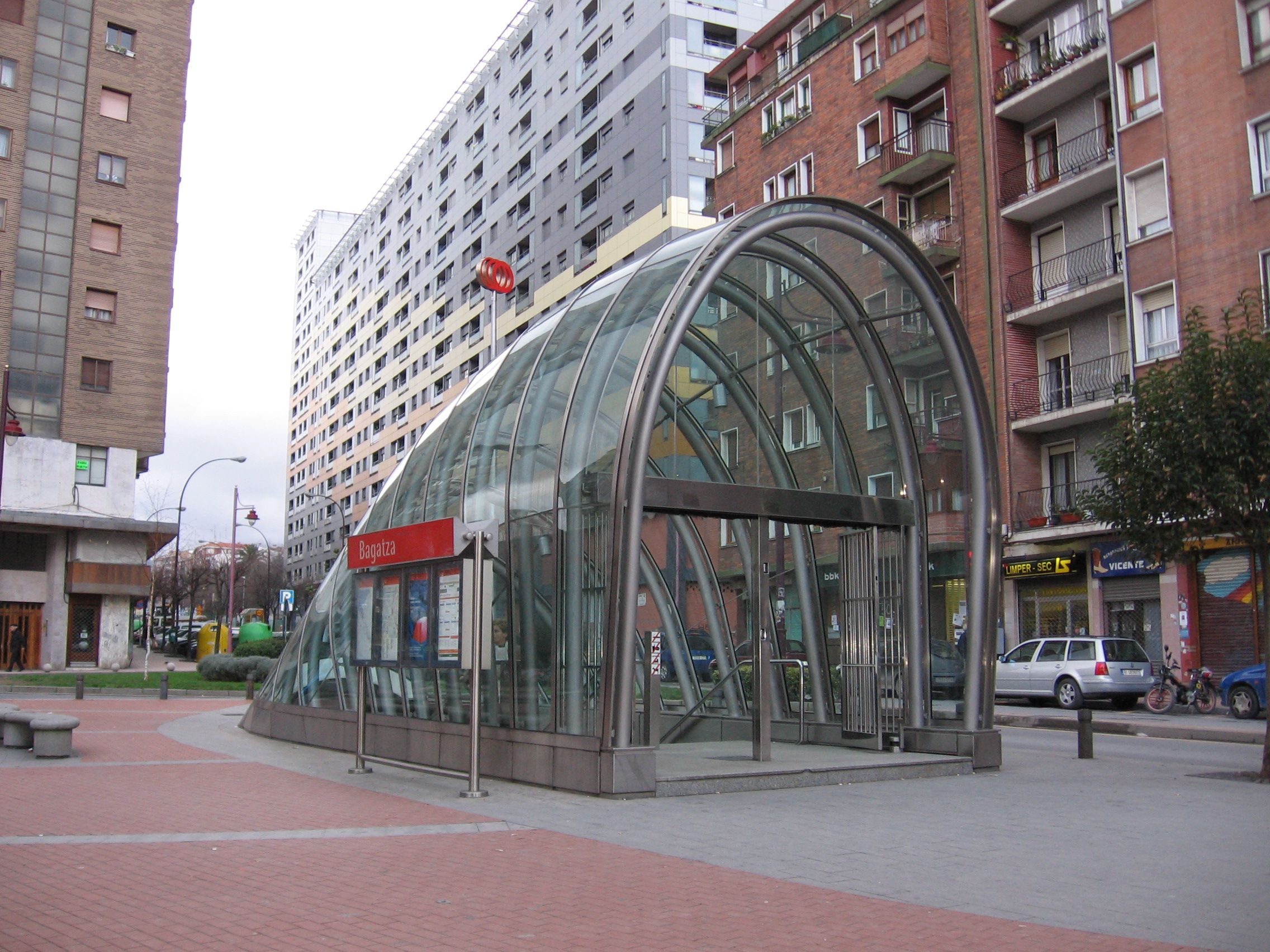
- Entrance to the station

General information
- Location: 36-40 De la Libertad Av. 48902 Barakaldo; Spain
- Coordinates: 43°17′59″N 2°59′35″W
- Owner: Biscay Transport Consortium; Euskal Trenbide Sarea
- Line: Line 2
- Platforms: 2 side platforms
- Tracks: 2

Construction
- Structure type: Underground
- Platform levels: 1
- Parking: No
- Accessible: Yes

Other information
- Fare zone: Zone 2

History
- Opened: 13 April 2002

Passengers
- 2021: 1,594,550

Services
Preceding station	Metro Bilbao	Following station
Urbinaga towards Kabiezes	Line 2	Barakaldo towards Basauri
Location

Bagatza is a station on Line 2 of the Bilbao Metro. It is located in the neighborhood of Santa Teresa, in the municipality of Barakaldo, near to San Eloy Hospital and the music conservatory. It opened on 13 April 2002.

== Station layout ==
Barakaldo station follows the typical cavern-shaped layout of most underground Metro Bilbao stations designed by Norman Foster, with the main hall located directly above the rail tracks.

=== Access ===
- Gabriel Aresti St. (Gabriel Aresti exit)
- Santa Teresa Plaza (Santa Teresa exit, closed during night time services)
- Gabriel Aresti St. (Gabriel Aresti exit)

== Services ==
The station is served by Line 2 from Basauri to Kabiezes. The station is also served by Bizkaibus regional bus services and Kbus, the municipal bus service.
