= Barakaldo (Bilbao Metro) =

Rapid transit station in Barakaldo, Basque Country, Spain

General information
- Location: 1 De la Libertad Av. 48902 Barakaldo; Spain
- Coordinates: 43°17′46″N 2°59′21″W
- Owner: Biscay Transport Consortium; Euskal Trenbide Sarea
- Line: Line 2
- Platforms: 2 side platforms
- Tracks: 2

Construction
- Structure type: Underground
- Platform levels: 1
- Parking: No
- Accessible: Yes

Other information
- Fare zone: Zone 2

History
- Opened: 13 April 2002

Passengers
- 2021: 2,686,535

Services
Preceding station	Metro Bilbao	Following station
Bagatza towards Kabiezes	Line 2	Ansio towards Basauri
Location

Barakaldo is a station on Line 2 of the Bilbao Metro. It is located in central Barakaldo, near to the city hall, the municipal courthouse and the Escuela Oficial de Idiomas. It opened on 13 April 2002.

== Station layout ==
Barakaldo station follows the typical cavern-shaped layout of most underground Metro Bilbao stations designed by Norman Foster, with the main hall located directly above the rail tracks.

=== Access ===
- 18 Los Fueros St. (Fueros exit)
- 1 Euskadi Av. (Corthouse) (Avda. Euskadi exit)
- 21 Elkano St. (Elkano exit)
- 2 De la Libertad Av.

== Services ==
The station is served by Line 2 from Basauri to Kabiezes. The station is also served by Bizkaibus regional bus services and Kbus, the municipal bus service.
