= Ariz (Bilbao Metro) =

Rapid transit station in Basauri, Basque Country, Spain

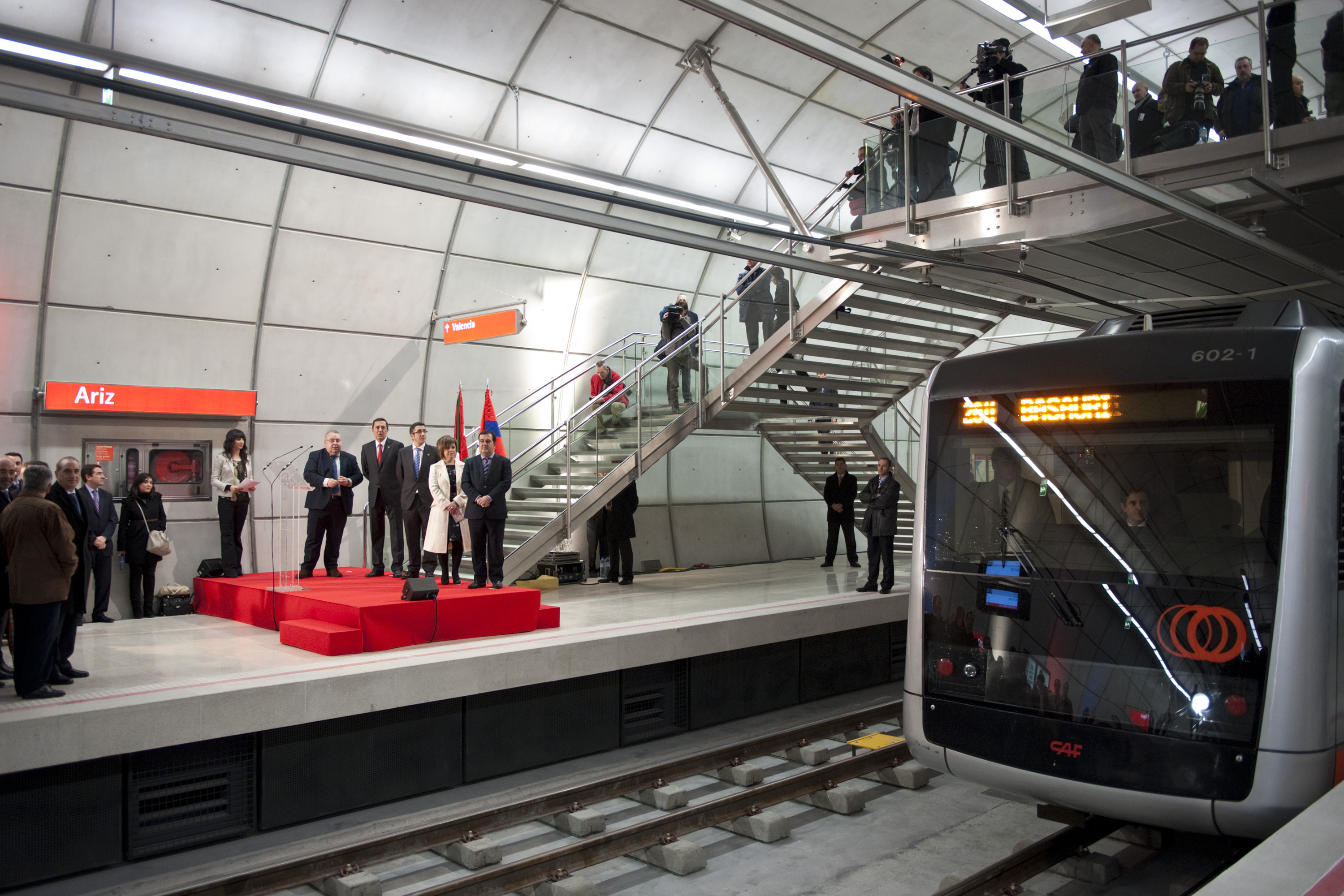
- Opening of the station

General information
- Location: 9 León St, Basauri; Spain
- Coordinates: 43°14′17″N 2°52′55″W
- Owner: Biscay Transport Consortium; Euskal Trenbide Sarea
- Line: Line 2
- Platforms: 2 side platforms
- Tracks: 2
- Connections: Bus

Construction
- Structure type: Underground
- Platform levels: 1
- Parking: No
- Accessible: No

Other information
- Fare zone: Zone 2

History
- Opened: 28 February 2011

Passengers
- 2021: 1,533,247

Services
Preceding station	Metro Bilbao	Following station
Etxebarri towards Kabiezes	Line 2	Basauri Terminus
Location

Ariz is a station on Line 2 of the Bilbao Metro. The station is located in the municipality of Basauri. It was opened in 2011.

The Euskotren Trena commuter railway network has a station with the same name at a distance of about 350 metres (380 yd), but the two stations are not connected.

== History ==
It was opened on 28 February 2011, being the first metro station in the municipality of Basauri, the other one being Basauri station, which was opened on 11 November that same year. During the first day, more than 8,000 passengers used the new station.

Until the opening of Basauri station, both Lines 1 and 2 reached Ariz; starting on November 11 only Line 2 uses it. Line 1 now terminates at Etxebarri.

== Station layout ==
Ariz station follows the typical cavern-shaped layout of most underground Metro Bilbao stations, with the main hall located directly above the rail tracks.

=== Access ===
- Nagusia St. (Nagusia exit)
- Valencia St. (Valencia exit, closed during night time services)
- León St.

== Services ==
The station is served by Line 2 from Kabiezes to Basauri with headways from five to ten minutes. Bus stops near the station are served by Bizkaibus regional services.
