= Sarriko (Bilbao Metro) =

Rapid transit station in Bilbao, Basque Country, Spain

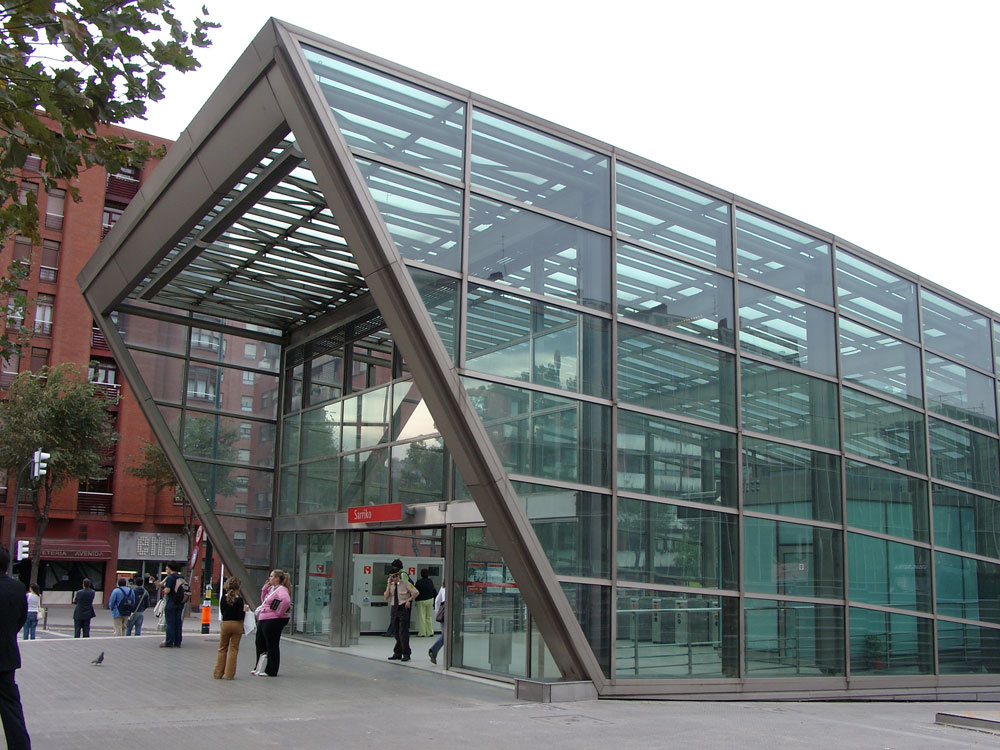
- Entrance to the station

General information
- Location: 86 Lehendakari Agirre Av. 48015 Bilbao; Spain
- Coordinates: 43°16′28″N 2°57′59″W
- Owner: Biscay Transport Consortium; Euskal Trenbide Sarea
- Lines: Line 1; Line 2
- Platforms: 2 side platforms
- Tracks: 2
- Connections: Bus

Construction
- Structure type: Underground
- Platform levels: 1
- Parking: No
- Accessible: Yes

Other information
- Fare zone: Zone 1

History
- Opened: 11 November 1995

Passengers
- 2021: 1,762,300

Services
Preceding station	Metro Bilbao	Following station
San Ignazio towards Plentzia	Line 1	Deustu towards Etxebarri
San Ignazio towards Kabiezes	Line 2	Deustu towards Basauri
Location

Sarriko is a station on Lines 1 and 2 of the Bilbao Metro. The station is located in the neighbourhood of Ibarrekolanda, part of the Deusto district. It is named after the Sarriko park located nearby. The station is near the Faculty of Business and Economic Sciences of the University of the Basque Country as well as the conservatory of music. It was opened on 11 November 1995.

== Station layout ==
Unlike the other underground stations within the city, Sarriko does not follow the typical cavern-shaped layout, but it is instead made up of a big single space, with a big crystal shelter allowing sunlight to reach the platform level. It was designed by Norman Foster, with a main hall located suspended directly above the rail tracks. In 1998 it was awarded the Brunel Award to railway stations.

=== Access ===
- 2 Benidorm St. (Ibarrekolanda exit)
- 2 Benidorm St (Ibarrekolanda exit)

== Services ==
The station is served by Line 1 from Etxebarri to Ibarbengoa and Plentzia, and by Line 2 from Basauri to Kabiezes. The station is also served by local Bilbobus and regional Bizkaibus bus services.
