= Line 2 (Bilbao Metro) =

Rapid transit line in Biscay, Basque Country, Spain

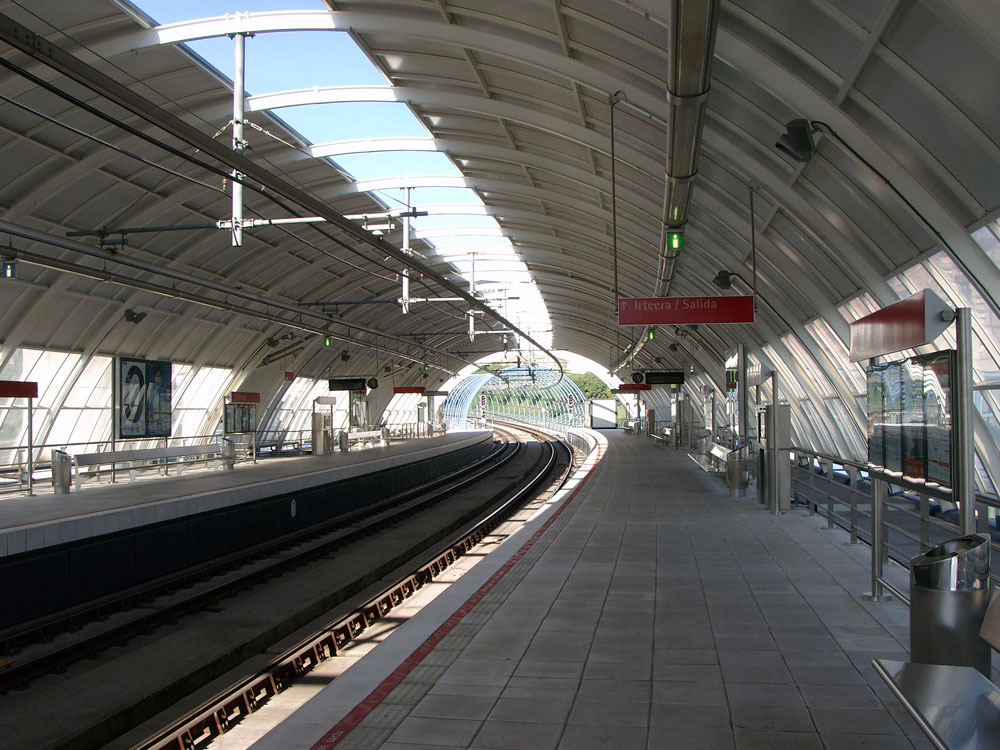
- Urbinaga station in 2005

Overview
- Owner: Biscay Transport Consortium
- Locale: Basauri, Etxebarri, Bilbao, Barakaldo, Sestao, Portugalete, Santurtzi (Basque Country, Spain)
- Termini: Kabiezes; Basauri
- Stations: 25

Service
- Type: Rapid transit
- System: Bilbao Metro
- Operator: Metro Bilbao
- Rolling stock: Metro Bilbao 500, 550, 600 series

History
- Opened: 13 April 2002; 24 years ago
- Last extension: 2014

Technical
- Line length: 22.98 km (14.28 mi)
- Track gauge: 1,000 mm (3 ft 3 3/8 in) metre gauge
- Electrification: 1,500 V DC overhead catenary

Line 2 of the Bilbao Metro is a rapid transit line in Biscay, Basque Country, Spain. It runs from Basauri to Kabiezes. Its route covers the municipalities of Basauri and Etxebarri, the city of Bilbao and the left bank of the Nervión river. The line has 25 stations.

== History ==
The first phase of the line opened on 13 April 2002, with five stations; Gurutzeta/Cruces, Ansio, Barakaldo, Bagatza and Urbinaga. Line 2 joins Line 1 at San Ignazio, and from that station both lines continue along the same route to Etxebarri (when Line 2 opened the southern terminus for both lines was Bolueta).

On 8 January 2005, two stations were added: Sestao to the north and Etxebarri to the south (Etxebarri also serves as the southern terminus for Line 1).

On 20 January 2007, the line was extended with two new stations: Portugalete and Abatxolo, both in the municipality of Portugalete.

On 4 July 2009, two more stations were opened: Peñota and Santurtzi, in Portugalete and Santurtzi respectively. A funicular at Santurtzi station connecting it to the neighborhood of Mamariga opened in late 2010.

In 2011, the line was extended southwards with two new stations, Ariz opening on 28 February and Basauri on 11 November. Both stations are in the municipality of Basauri.

On 28 June 2014, Kabiezes station opened, in the municipality of Santurtzi. Its opening marked the completion of the line as originally planned.

== Station list ==
| Station | Transfers (Note: All stations on the San Ignazio-Etxebarri section are also served by Line 1.) | Location | | Opening date (Note: The stations on the San Ignazio-Bolueta section were opened between 1995 and 1997 as part of Line 1.) |
|---|---|---|---|---|
| Kabiezes | | Santurtzi | | 28 June 2014 |
| Santurtzi | | Santurtzi | | 4 July 2009 |
| Peñota | | Portugalete | | 4 July 2009 |
| Portugalete | | Portugalete | | 20 January 2007 |
| Abatxolo | | Portugalete | | 20 January 2007 |
| Sestao | | Sestao | | 8 January 2005 |
| Urbinaga | | Sestao | | 13 April 2002 |
| Bagatza | | Barakaldo | | 13 April 2002 |
| Barakaldo | | Barakaldo | | 13 April 2002 |
| Ansio | | Barakaldo | | 13 April 2002 |
| Gurutzeta/Cruces | | Barakaldo | | 13 April 2002 |
| San Ignazio | Line 1 | Deusto | Bilbao | 11 November 1995 |
| Sarriko | | Deusto | Bilbao | 11 November 1995 |
| Deustu | | Deusto | Bilbao | 11 November 1995 |
| San Mamés | Bilbao tram; Cercanías; Bilbao Intermodal | Basurto-Zorroza | Bilbao | 11 November 1995 |
| Indautxu | | Abando | Bilbao | 11 November 1995 |
| Eliptikoa | | Abando | Bilbao | 11 November 1995 |
| Abando | Bilbao tram; (Bilbao-Abando and Bilbao-Concordia); (Bilbao-Abando and Bilbao-Concordia) | Abando | Bilbao | 11 November 1995 |
| Zazpikaleak/Casco Viejo | Line 3; Bilbao tram; Line E1; Line E3; Line E4 | Ibaiondo | Bilbao | 11 November 1995 |
| Santutxu | | Begoña | Bilbao | 5 July 1997 |
| Basarrate | | Begoña | Bilbao | 5 July 1997 |
| Bolueta | Bilbao tram | Begoña | Bilbao | 5 July 1997 |
| Etxebarri | Line 1 | Etxebarri | | 8 January 2005 |
| Ariz | | Basauri | | 28 February 2011 |
| Basauri | | Basauri | | 11 November 2011 |
