= Barakaldo =

Barakaldo Baracaldo (Spanish)
- Municpality and City
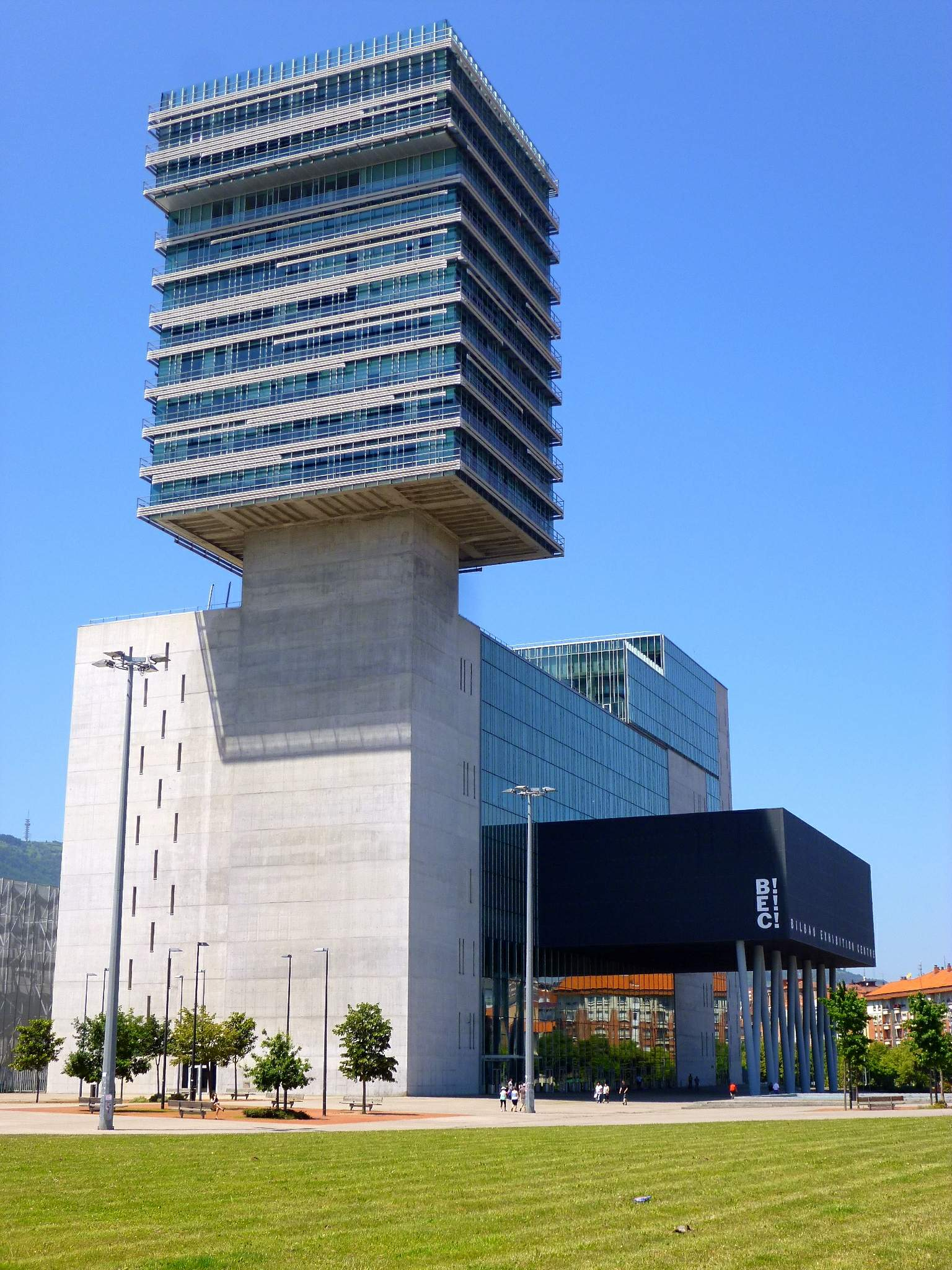
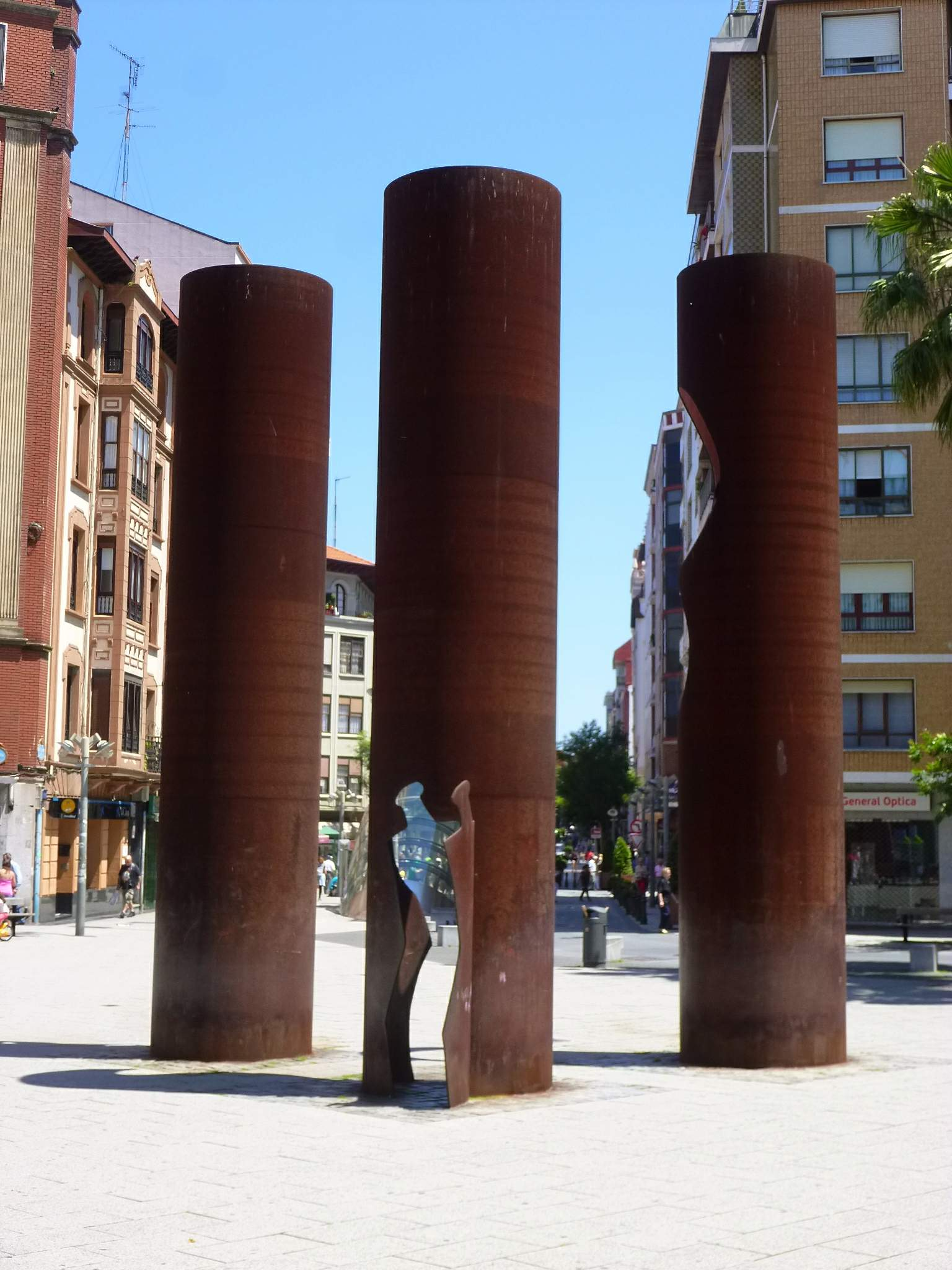
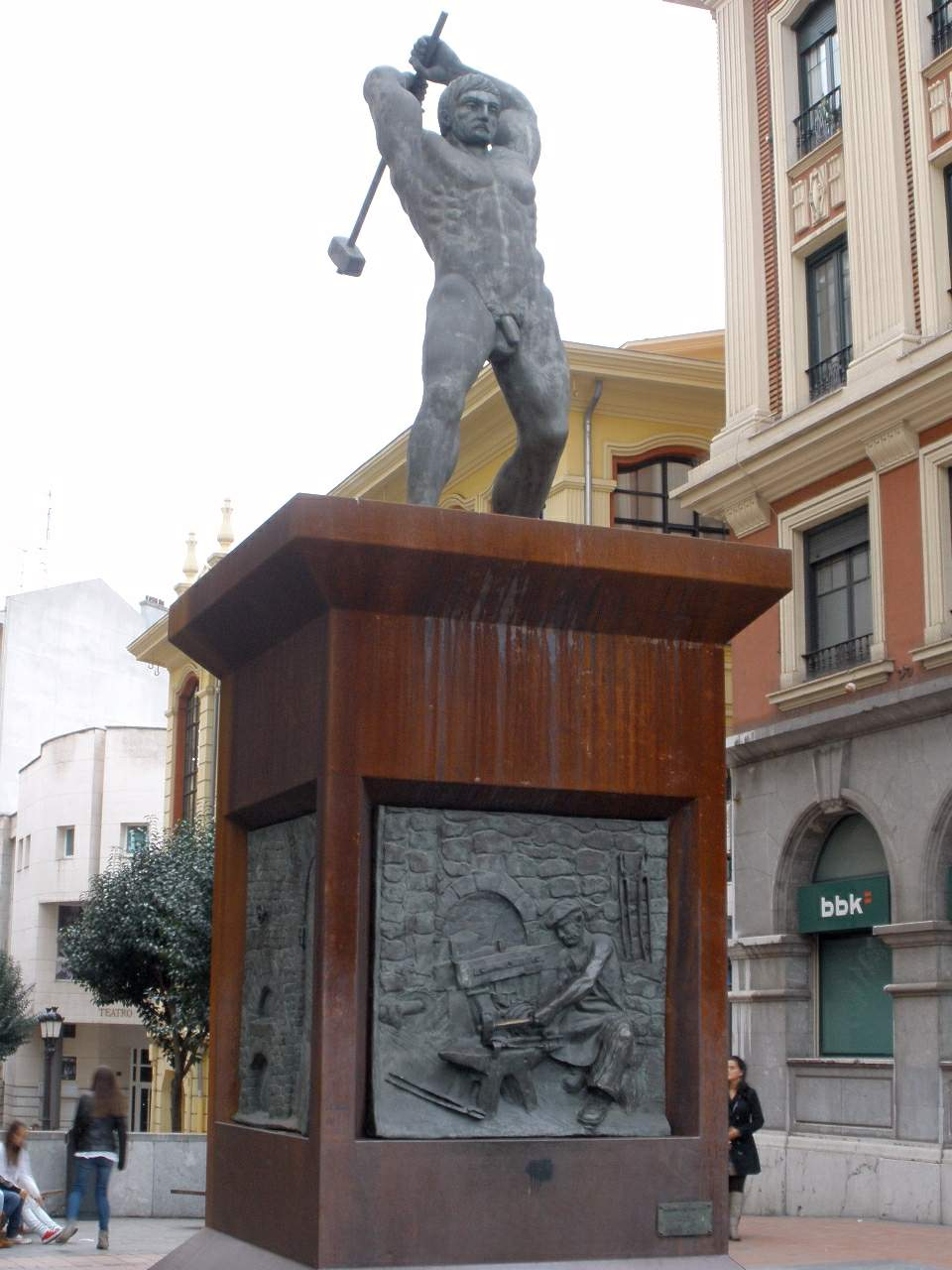
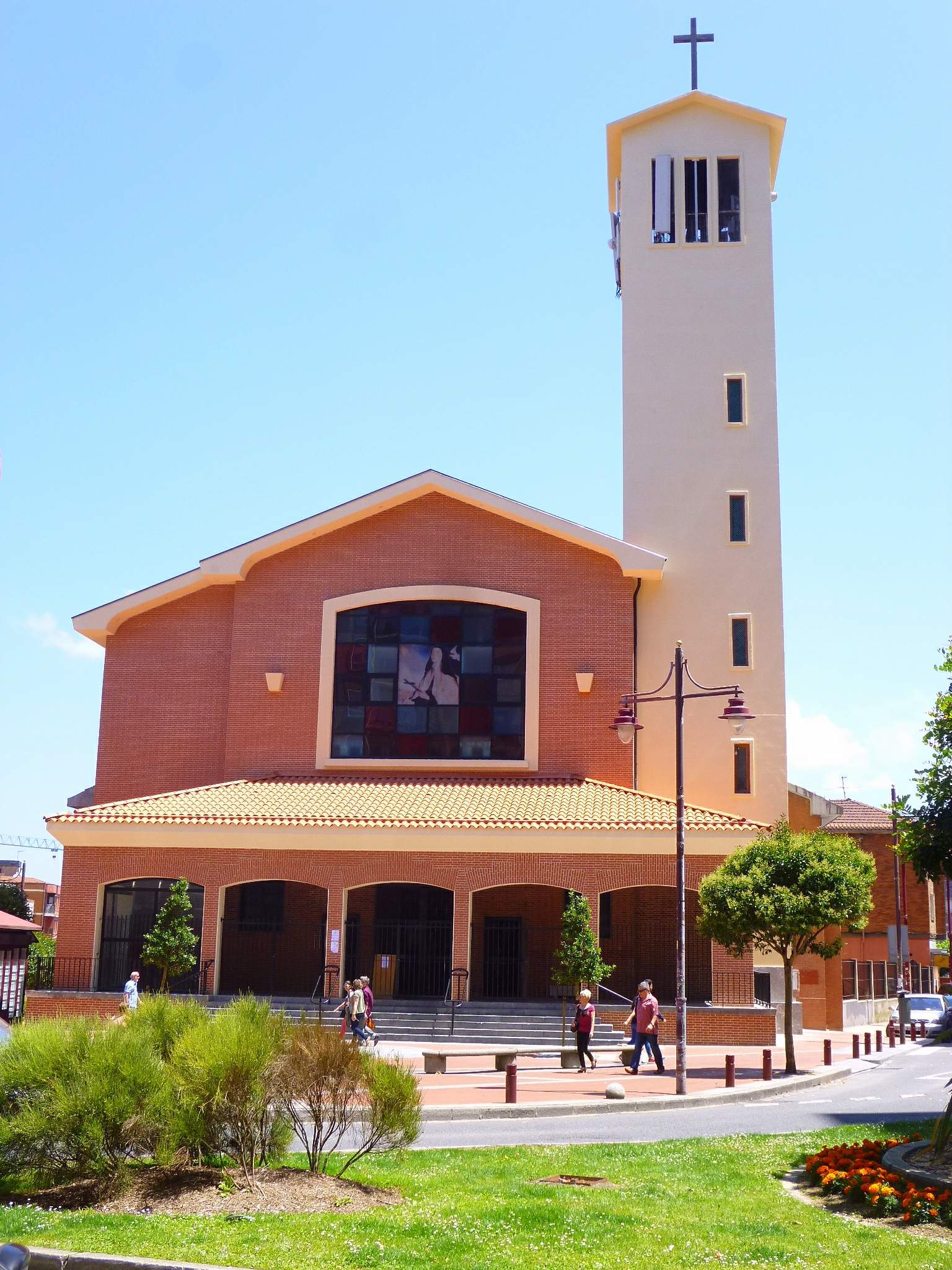
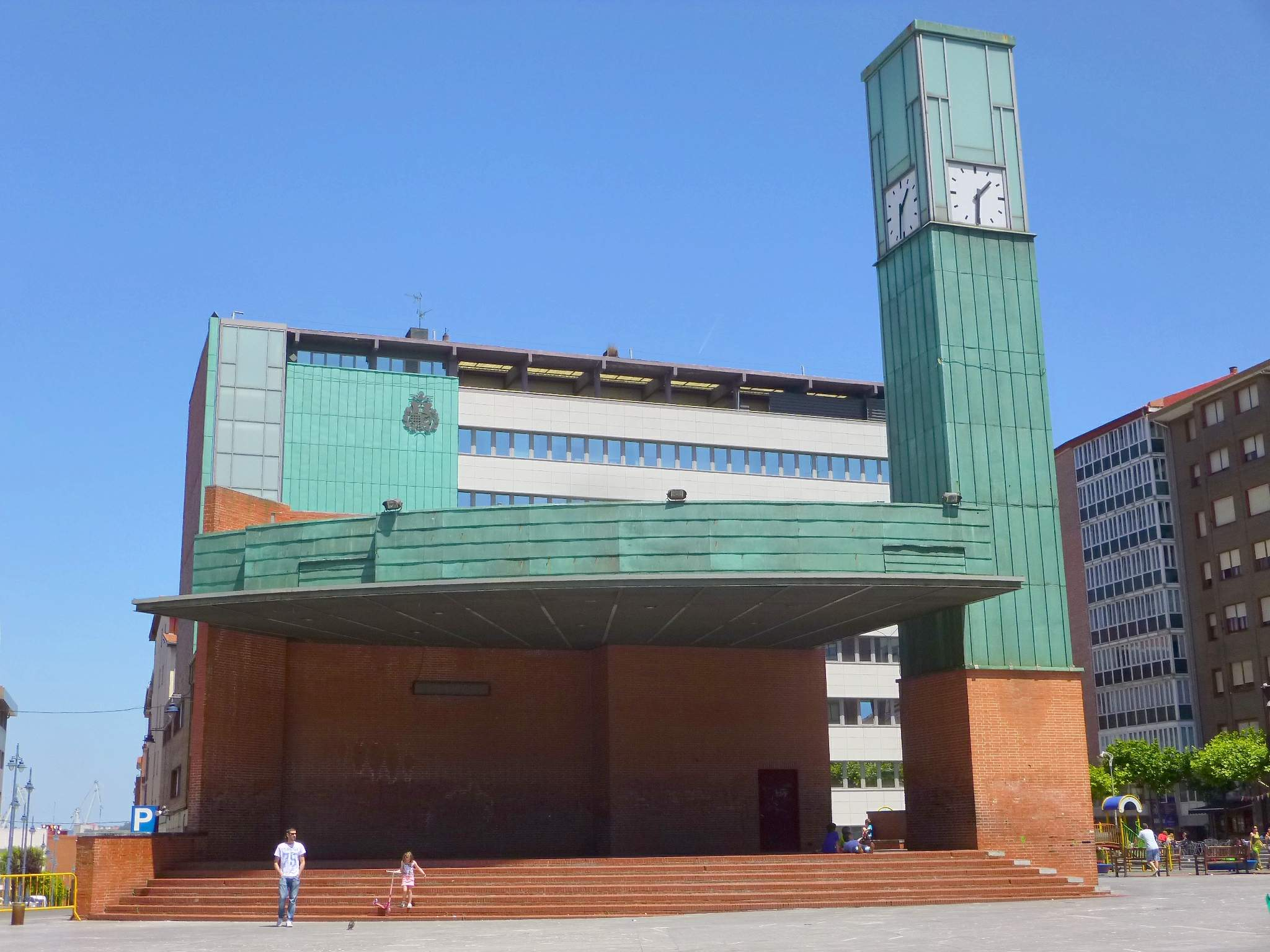
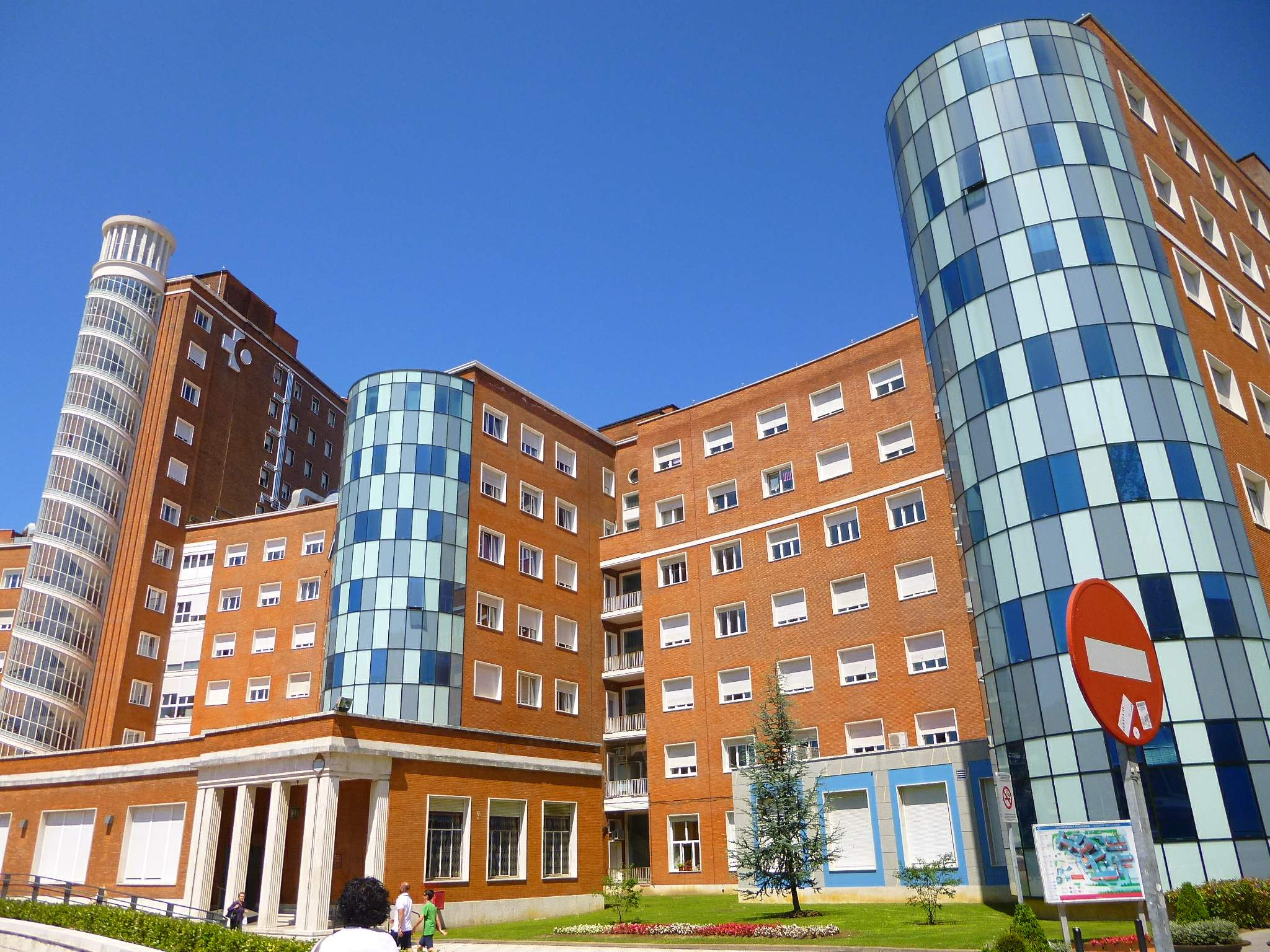

- Flag Coat of arms

- Location of Barakaldo within the Basque Country
- Coordinates: 43°17′50″N 2°59′30″W
- Country: Spain
- Autonomous community: Basque Country
- Province: Biscay
- Comarca: Greater Bilbao
- Founded: pre-1051

Government
  - Mayoress: Amaia del Campo Berasategi (2015-Today) (PNV)

Area
  - Municipality: 24.99 km^{2} (9.65 sq mi)
- Elevation: 39 m (128 ft)
- Highest elevation: 560 m (1,840 ft)
- Lowest elevation: 0 m (0 ft)

Population (2025)
  - Municipality: 103,084
  - Rank: 65th in Spain
  - Density: 4,125/km^{2} (10,680/sq mi)
- Demonym(s): baracaldés, -sa
- Time zone: UTC+1 (CET)
  - Summer (DST): UTC+2 (CEST)
- Postal code: 48900, 48901, 48902 and 48903
- Dialing code: 94
- Website: Official website

Barakaldo (Basque pronunciation: [baɾakalðo]; Spanish: Baracaldo) is a municipality in the Biscay province in the autonomous community of the Basque Country in Spain. Located on the Left Bank of the Estuary of Bilbao, the city is part of Greater Bilbao, and with a population of 103,084 is Bilbao's largest suburb.

Barakaldo has an industrial river-port heritage and has undergone significant redevelopment with new commercial and residential areas replacing the once active industrial zones.

== History ==
The 1911 Encyclopædia Britannica original entry on the town stated:

"Pop.(1900): 15,013. Few Spanish towns have developed more rapidly than Baracaldo [sic], which nearly doubled its population between 1880 and 1900. During this period many immigrant labourers settled here; for the iron works and dynamite factory of Baracaldo prospered greatly, owing to the increased output of the Biscayan mines, the extension of railways in the neighbourhood, and the growth of shipping at Bilbao. The low flat country round Barakaldo is covered with maize, pod fruit and vines".

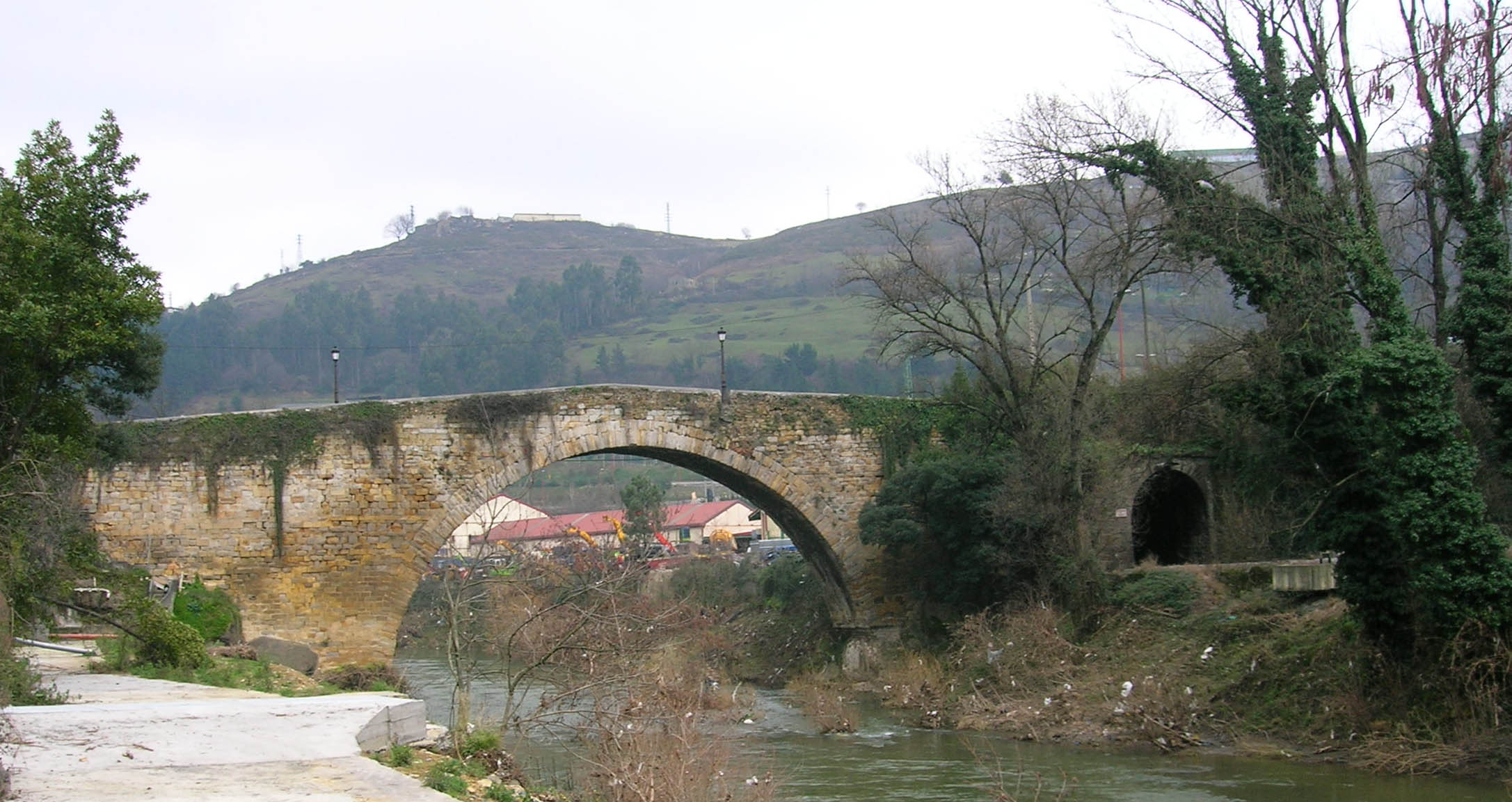
Devil's Bridge over the river Cadagua between Barakaldo and Bilbao

Iron mining formed a large part of Barakaldo's industry, making it the endpoint of a mining railway. The steel industry, led by Altos Hornos de Vizcaya, had an important presence during the 20th century, until the industrial recession hit the region's economy in the 1980s.

In recent decades, the industrial zones surrounding Barakaldo have become less prominent, which can be owed to the shuttering of large companies such as Babcock & Wilcox. Although several factories remain, areas that were once industrial have been redeveloped into residential properties such as malls and parks. A large exhibition centre. the Bilbao Exhibition Centre has recently been built on the outskirts of the town.

== Demographics ==
As of 2025, the population is 103,084, of which 48.3% are male, and 51.7% are female. Minors make up 14.9% of the population, and seniors make up 24.1%.

Historical population

Year	Pop.	±%
1842	1,958	—
1857	2,369	+21.0%
1877	4,360	+84.0%
1887	8,032	+84.2%
1900	13,872	+72.7%
1910	19,429	+40.1%
1920	27,404	+41.0%
1930	34,009	+24.1%
1940	36,333	+6.8%

Year	Pop.	±%
1950	41,163	+13.3%
1960	77,354	+87.9%
1970	109,185	+41.1%
1981	118,615	+8.6%
1991	105,088	−11.4%
2001	94,478	−10.1%
2011	100,064	+5.9%
2021	100,847	+0.8%

Population figures include Alonsotegi between the 1900 and 1980 censuses, which was part of Barakaldo during this time
Source: INE

=== Immigration ===
As of 2025, immigrants make up 15.6% of the population. The 5 largest foreign countries of birth are Colombia, Venezuela, Paraguay, Morocco, and Bolivia.

== Transport ==
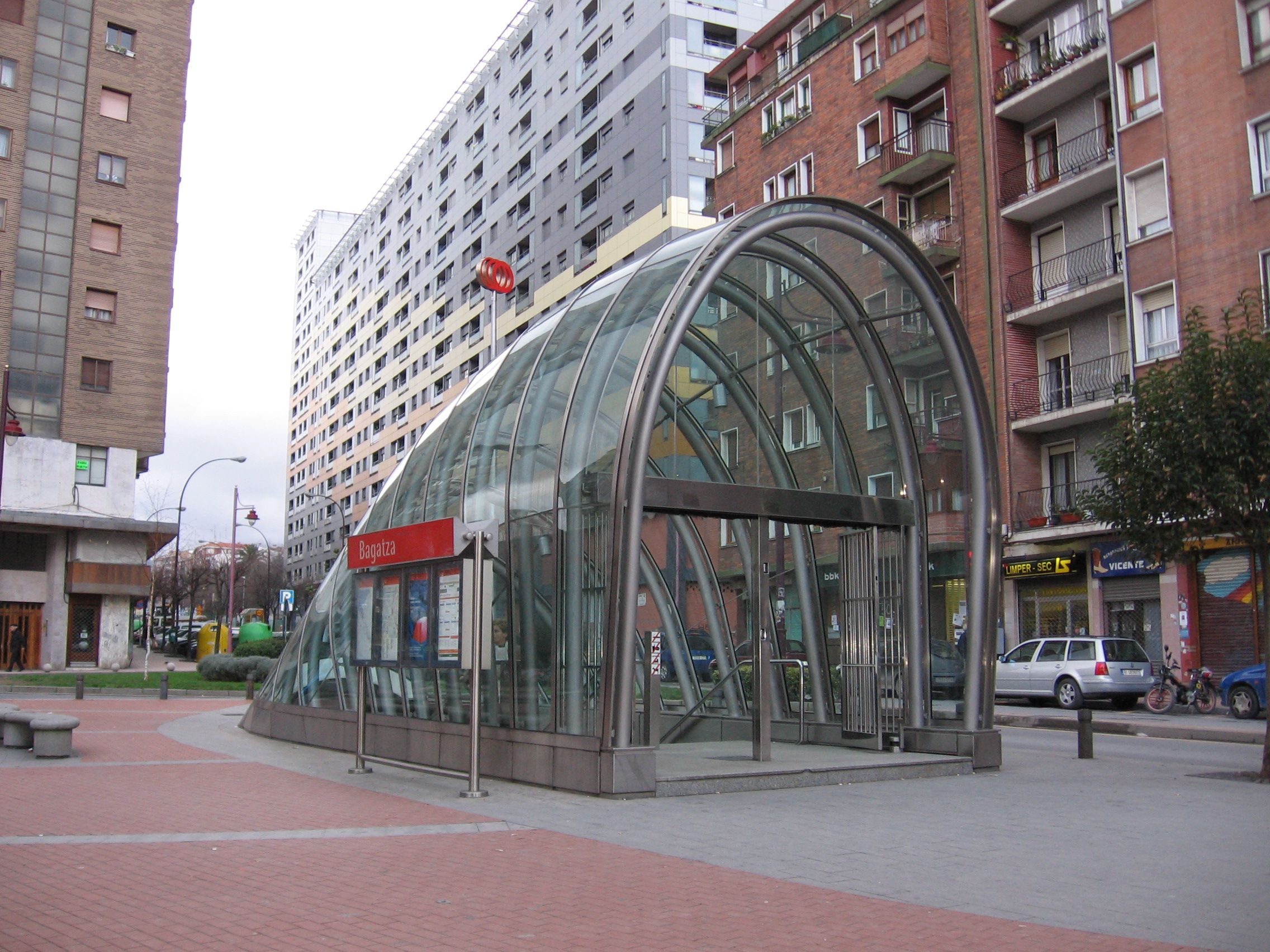
Entrance to Bagatza Metro station

Barakaldo is connected to the rest of the Greater Bilbao metropolitan area by Line 2 of the Bilbao Metro. Four stations are in the city: Gurutzeta/Cruces, Ansio, Barakaldo and Bagatza). The Cercanías Bilbao train line has two stations in Barakaldo (Lutxana and Desertu-Barakaldo). BizkaiBus company provides a bus service, with connections to the rest of Biscay.

Locally, an urban bus system named Kbus operates with two lines. A tram line has been proposed to connect local districts.

The main motorway is the A-8 motorway, which also goes between Bilbao. It serves as the main road link between Greater Bilbao and the rest of Spain.

A boat ferry service connects Barakaldo to the other side of the Estuary of Bilbao in Erandio. Barakaldo is located 15 kilometres (9.3 mi) from Bilbao Airport.

== Tourism ==
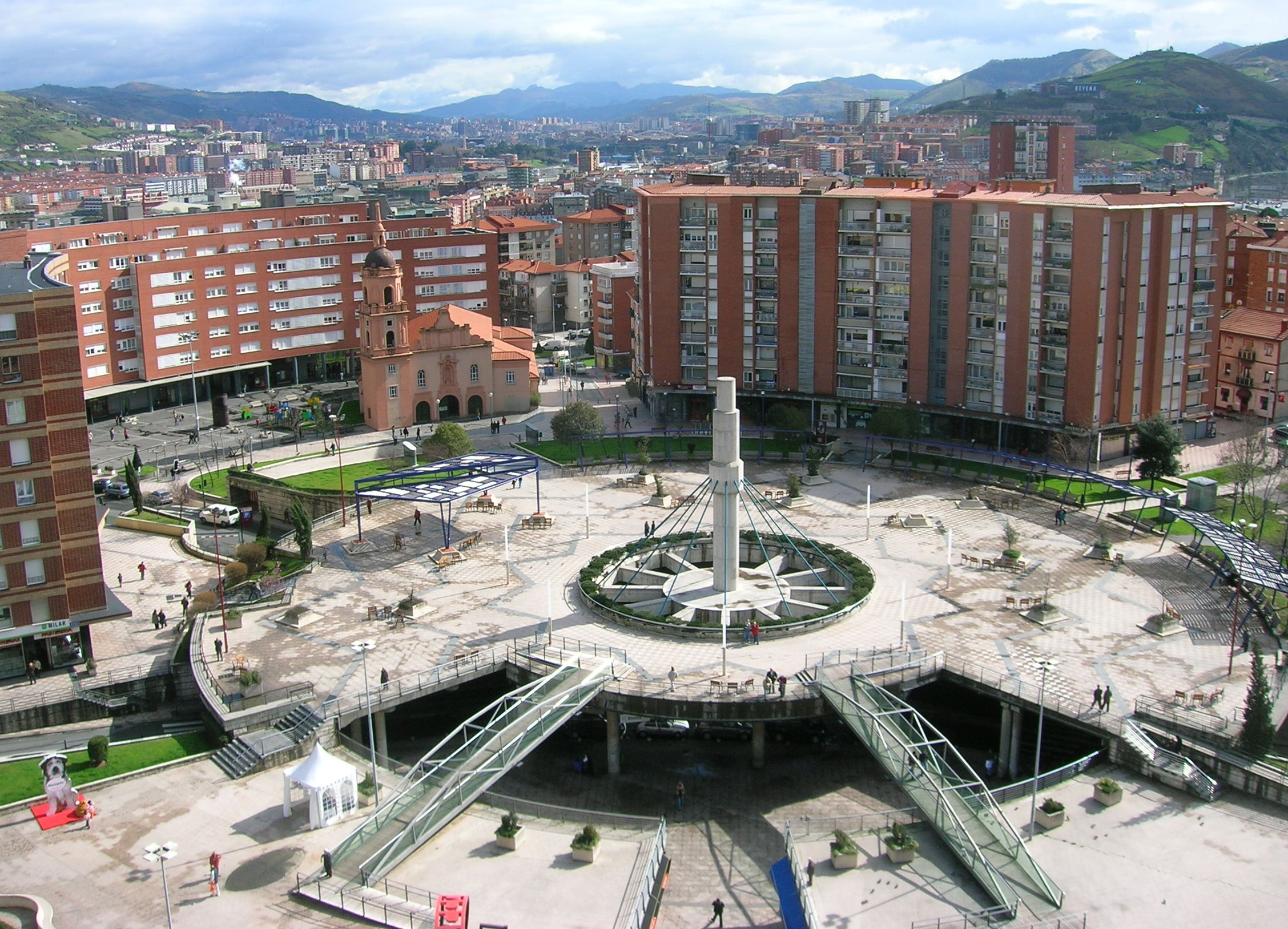
Plaza de Cruces - Gurutzeta, as seen from the Hospital.

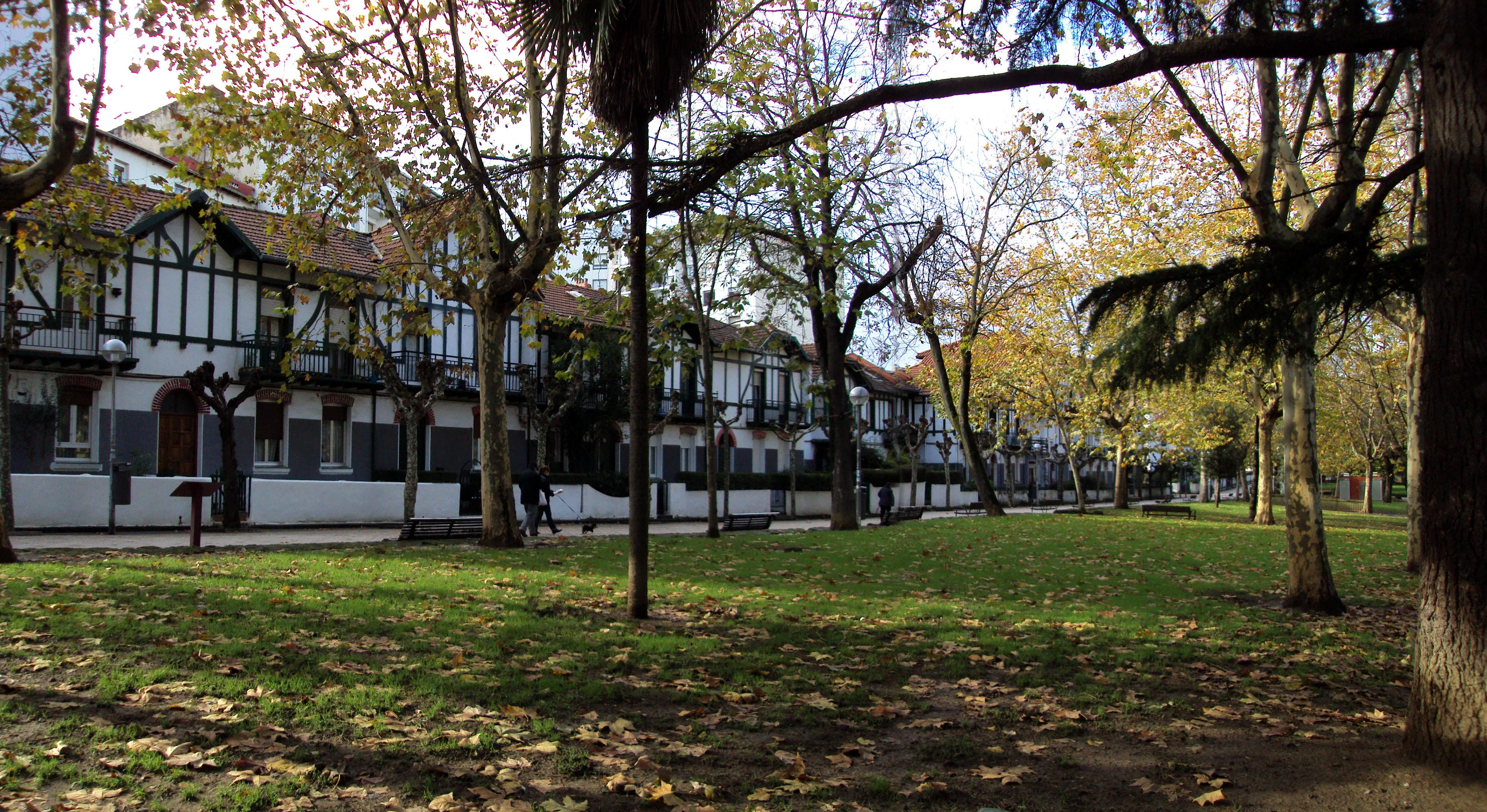
Done Bikendi district

Tourists visit sites in Barakaldo such as the Botanic Garden, the Bilbao Exhibition Centre, the medieval Bridge of Castrexana, and some of the city's street sculptures. In July, the town celebrates "Las Fiestas del Carmen," which includes open-air concerts and large fairs.

== Sports ==
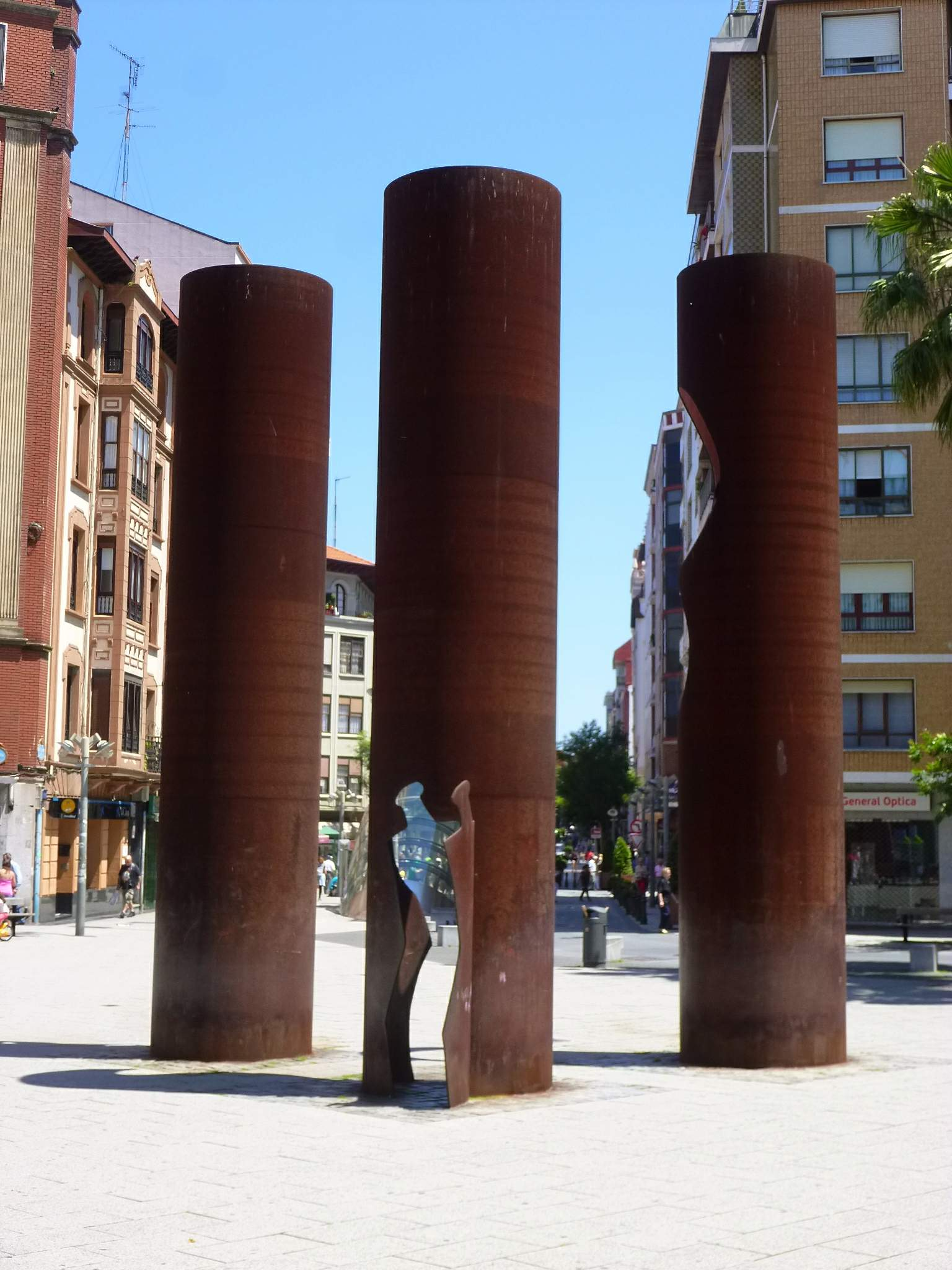
Bide Onera Square (Plaza Bide Onera)

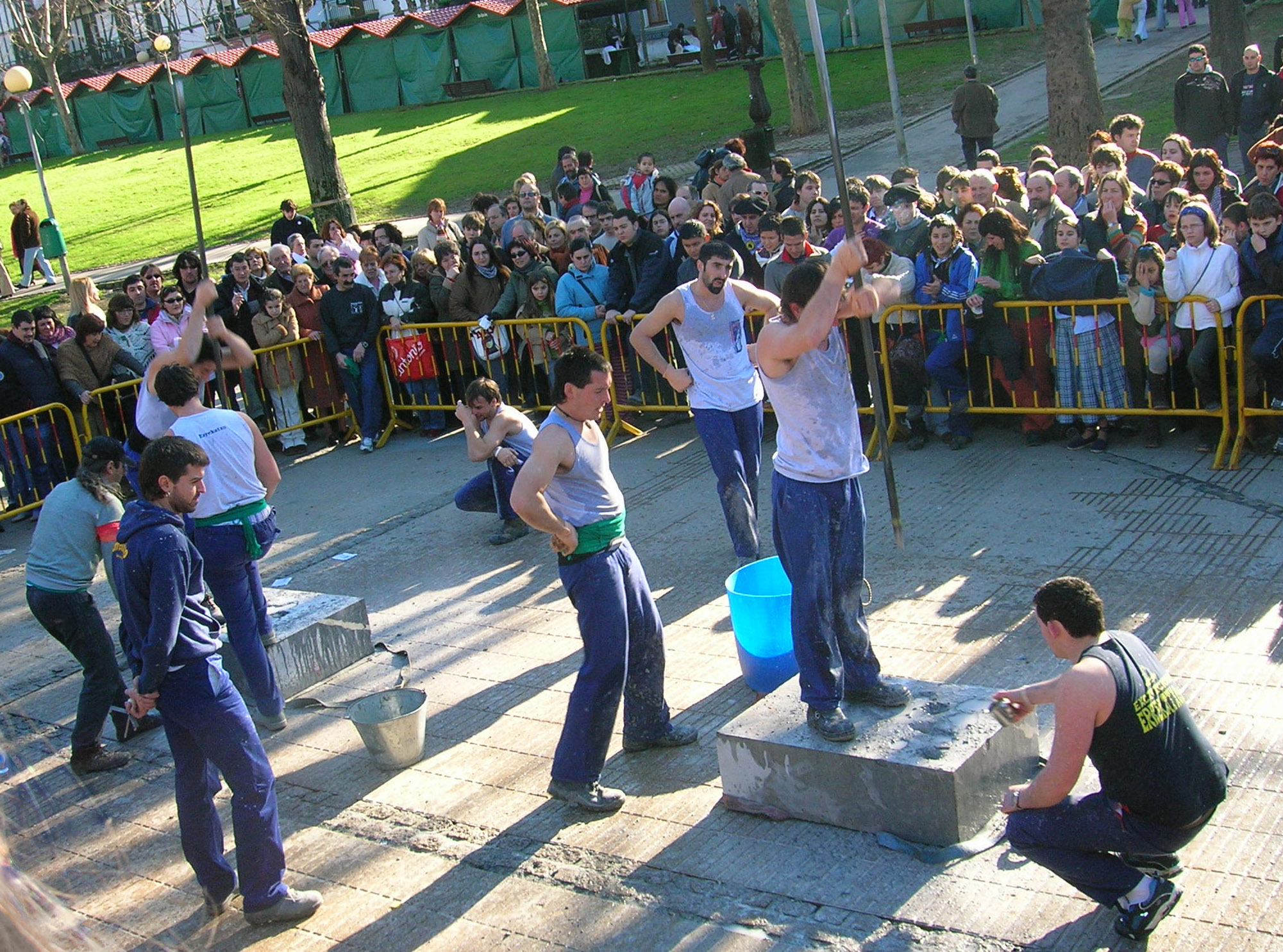
A stone drilling contest at Saint Vincent's fiestas

Barakaldo is represented by the Barakaldo Club de Fútbol in Spain's Primera Federación. They play home games at the Estadio Nuevo Lasesarre. Local league teams include Gurutzeta KFT, SD Retuerto Sport, UD Burtzeña, Pauldarrak FKT, Zuazo C.F. and S.C.D. Dosa-Salesianos.

Handball has played a part in Barakaldo's tradition. Now, two teams are present in competitions: Club Balonmano Zuazo Femenino, playing in División de Honor Femenina de Balonmano, and Club Balonmano Barakaldo who plays in the Liga ASOBAL.

Bizkaia Arena is an indoor arena with a capacity of 18,640. It hosted some games of the 2014 FIBA Basketball World Cup.

== Notable people ==
- Asier del Horno, footballer
- Carlos Sobera, actor
- David López, cyclist
- Iñaki Lafuente, footballer
- Javier Clemente, football manager
- Javier González Gómez, footballer
- Javier Otxoa, cyclist
- Josep Lluís Núñez, president of FC Barcelona between 1978 and 2000
- Unai Expósito, footballer
- Antonio Iturmendi Bañales, politician
- Begoña Maestre, actress
- Lucía García, footballer
- Esty Quesada, YouTuber and podcaster

== See also ==
- Barakaldo D.F., a Mägo de Oz concert DVD filmed in Barakaldo
