= Basauri (Bilbao Metro) =

Rapid transit station in Basauri, Basque Country, Spain

- Station location

General information
- Location: 31 Marcelino González St, Basauri; Spain
- Coordinates: 43°14′12″N 2°53′40″W
- Owner: Biscay Transport Consortium; Euskal Trenbide Sarea
- Line: Line 2
- Platforms: 2 side platforms
- Tracks: 2
- Connections: Bus

Construction
- Structure type: Underground
- Platform levels: 1
- Parking: No
- Accessible: Yes

Other information
- Fare zone: Zone 2

History
- Opened: 11 November 2011

Passengers
- 2021: 1,066,272

Services
Preceding station	Metro Bilbao	Following station
Ariz towards Kabiezes	Line 2	Terminus
Location

Basauri is the southern terminus of Line 2 of the Bilbao Metro. The station is located in the municipality of Basauri, part of the Bilbao metropolitan area. It opened in 2011.

The Cercanías Bilbao commuter railway network (operated by Renfe) also has a Basauri station on its C3 line, but they are not at the same location – there is a distance of about 2.3 kilometres (1.4 mi) between them, with the Cercanías station serving the industrial area to the south of the town, including the large Sidenor steel facility.

== History ==
The station was opened on 11 November 2011, the second metro station in Basauri after Ariz. It was the newest station on line 2 until the opening of Kabiezes in 2014.

== Station layout ==
Basauri station follows the typical cavern-shaped layout of most underground Metro Bilbao stations designed by Norman Foster, with the main hall located directly above the rail tracks.

=== Access ===
- Basozelai St., next to the City Hall (Basozelai exit, closed during the night time services)
- 2 Bidasoa St. (Bidasoa exit)
- 23 Gipuzkoa St. (Gipuzkoa exit)

== Services ==
The station is served by Line 2 to Kabiezes with headways from five to ten minutes. Bus stops near the station are served by Bizkaibus regional services.
