= Kabiezes (Bilbao Metro) =

Rapid transit station in Santurtzi, Basque Country, Spain

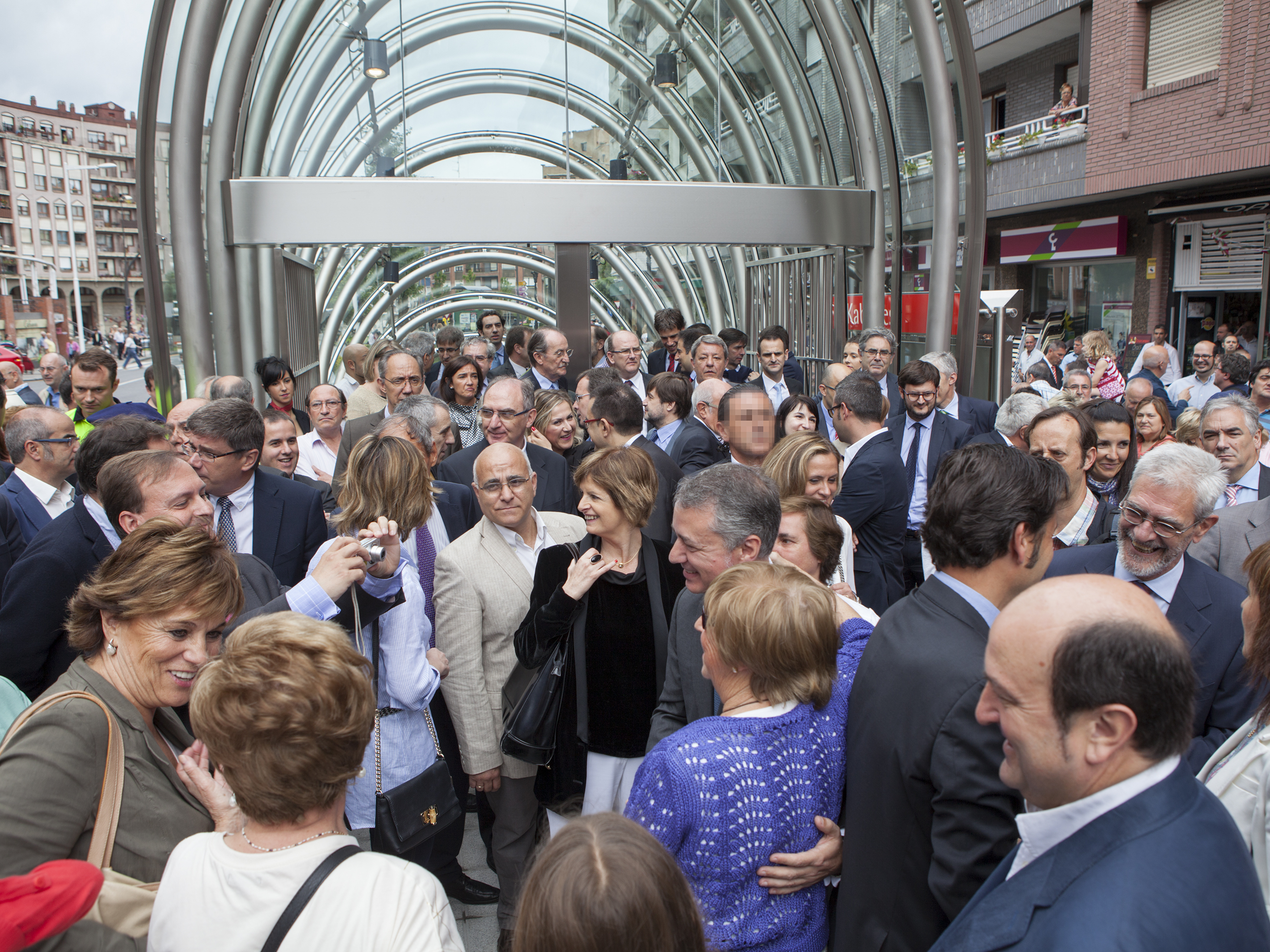
- Entrance to the station, opening day

General information
- Location: 68 Antonio Alzaga Av, Santurtzi; Spain
- Coordinates: 43°19′21″N 3°02′16″W
- Owner: Biscay Transport Consortium; Euskal Trenbide Sarea
- Line: Line 2
- Platforms: 2 side platforms
- Tracks: 2

Construction
- Structure type: Underground
- Platform levels: 1
- Parking: No
- Accessible: Yes

Other information
- Fare zone: Zone 2

History
- Opened: 28 June 2014

Passengers
- 2021: 777,813

Services
Preceding station	Metro Bilbao	Following station
Terminus	Line 2	Santurtzi towards Basauri
Location

Kabiezes is the northern terminus of Line 2 of the Bilbao Metro. It is located in the neighborhood of Kabiezes, in the municipality of Santurtzi. Construction of the station and the track between Santurtzi and Kabiezes began in 2009 and was delayed after a mudslide flooded the tunnel connecting both stations. It opened on 28 June 2014.

== Station layout ==
Kabiezes station follows the typical cavern-shaped layout of most underground Metro Bilbao stations designed by Norman Foster, with the main hall located directly above the rail tracks.

=== Access ===
- 64 Antonio Alzaga Av. (Antonio Alzaga exit)
- 3 Lauaxeta St. (Lauaxeta exit, closed during night time services)
- 68 Antonio Alzaga Av. (Antonio Alzaga exit)

== Services ==
The station is served by Line 2 to Basauri with headways from five to ten minutes. Bus stops near the station are served by Bizkaibus regional services.
