= BizkaiBus =

Biscay's suburban bus network

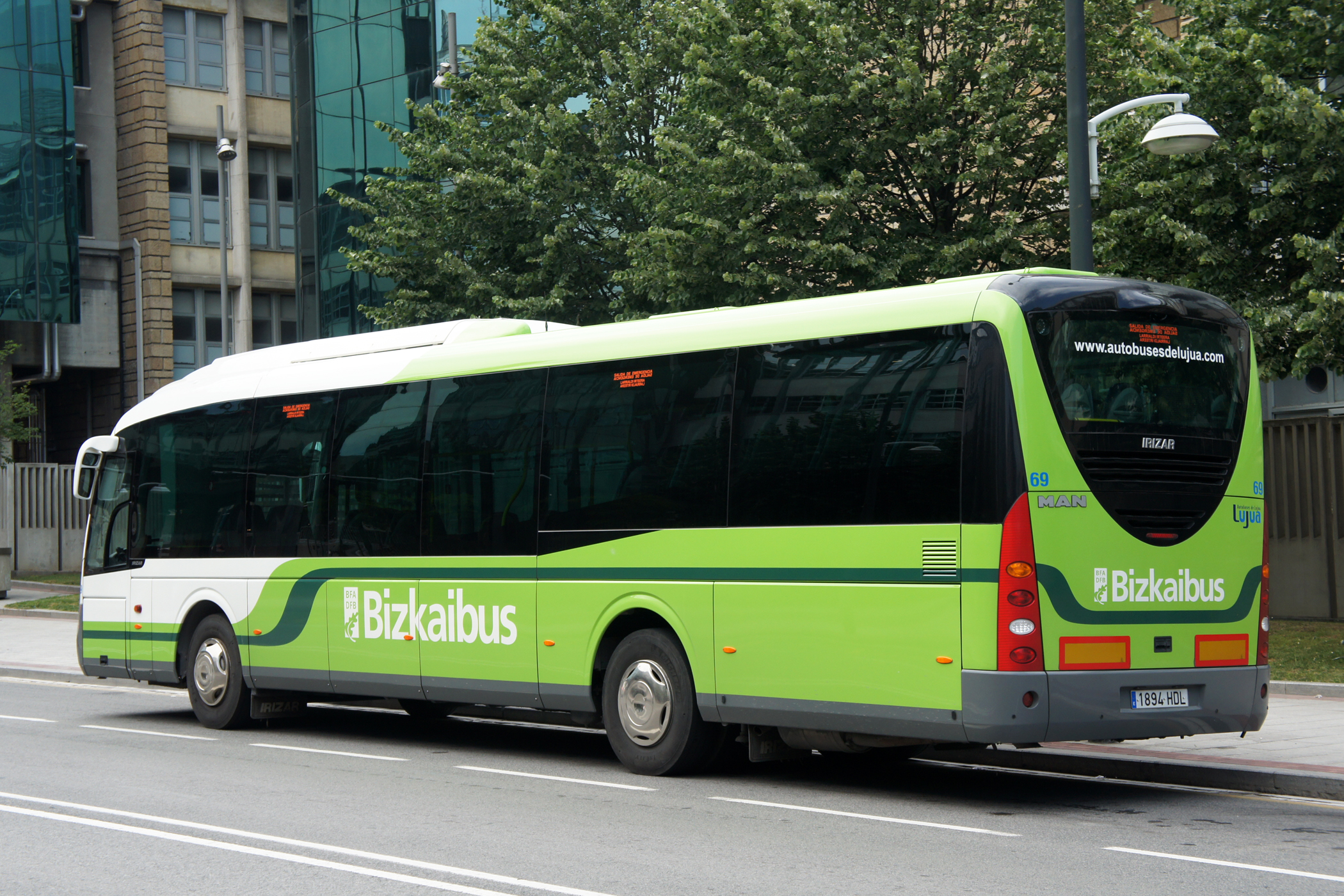
- Bizkaibus unit in Bilbao
- Locale: Biscay, Spain
- Service type: Suburban bus and coach
- Website: www.bizkaia.eus/web/bizkaibus

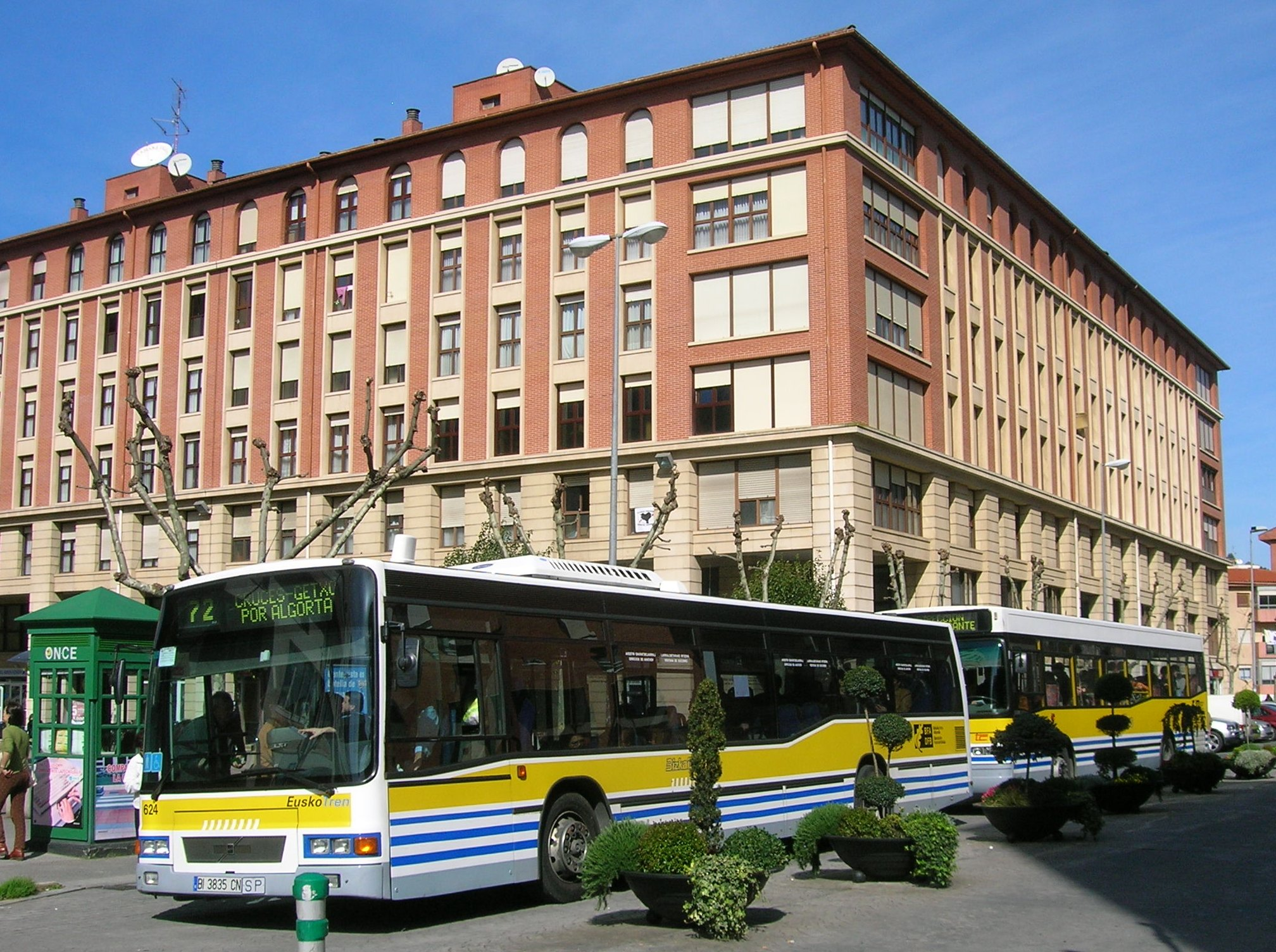
Two units in Leioa with the pre-2009 livery.

BizkaiBus is the name for suburban bus and coach services serving the province of Biscay, Spain. It is named after the Basque name of the province, Bizkaia. The buses can be identified by their distinctive green (until 2009 yellow) livery.

The bus network is integrated in the Barik card system.

== Characteristics ==
BizkaiBus is the result of the combination of several companies that offered bus travel services in the province of Biscay, TCSA, CAV, PESA, Encartaciones, Euskotren, Adnor and Autobuses de Lujua. The service is funded by the authority of Biscay or Diputacion Foral and operates as many as 100 bus lines. Some of the lines are seasonal, and only operate during certain months, for example a number of summer season lines to beach areas.

Various bus companies have steadily joined the Bizkaibus consortium over the years. The bus lines of EuskoTren joined in the year 2002, Adnor joined in 2005, and Autobuses de Lujua in 2006. Of the original companies offering bus public transport in Biscay Vigiola remains the only non-affiliated bus operator.

In 2006 the line between Bilbao and Castro Urdiales was excluded from Bizkaibus, as the line was solely funded by the Biscay local authority and the town of Castro Urdiales lies in the province of Cantabria.

== Lines departing from Bilbao ==
There are around 100 lines operated by Bizkaibus. The numbering system depends on the zone of Biscay. The routes in Uribe Kosta begin with 21, University routes begin with 23, the routes on the left bank of Greater Bilbao begin with 31, those of the right bank of Greater Bilbao are prefixed 34, the River Nervion area routes are designated with the number 36, the Encartaciones region 33, the routes operated by the company CAV the number 35, and PESA the number 39.

== Fares & Tickets ==
Type of ticket (2025)	1 zone	2 zones	3 zones	4 zones	5 zones
Occasional ticket Notice: Occasional ticket for the airport line A3247 Bilbao-Airport: 4,50€.	€1.90	€2.10	€2.15	€3.40	€4.50
Creditrans Barik card	€0.99	€1.16	€1.39	€1.90	€2.45
Gizatrans Barik (retirees, disabled...)	€0.61				
Transfer in less than 90 minutes Only with Barik Card	FREE				

*Transportations aids by government not included. Monthly passes for registered in any municipality in Biscay not included (see Spanish).

On the A3247 line, which goes from Bilbao City to Bilbao Airport (BIO), a single-trip ticket costs €4.50. It can be purchased on the bus with contactless bank card, or at the ticket office located in the arrivals area of Bilbao Airport. On this line, provided you validate with a Barik card, the regular fare is applied. (Zone 2, €1.16 per person).

The Barik card is sold in Metro stations and are valid everywhere in Biscay. Also, it can be used in Alava and Guipuzkoa, but cannot be recharged. You can recharge them directly in metro stations, but also with the Barik NFC app.
