= Abando (Bilbao Metro) =

Rapid transit station in Bilbao, Basque Country, Spain

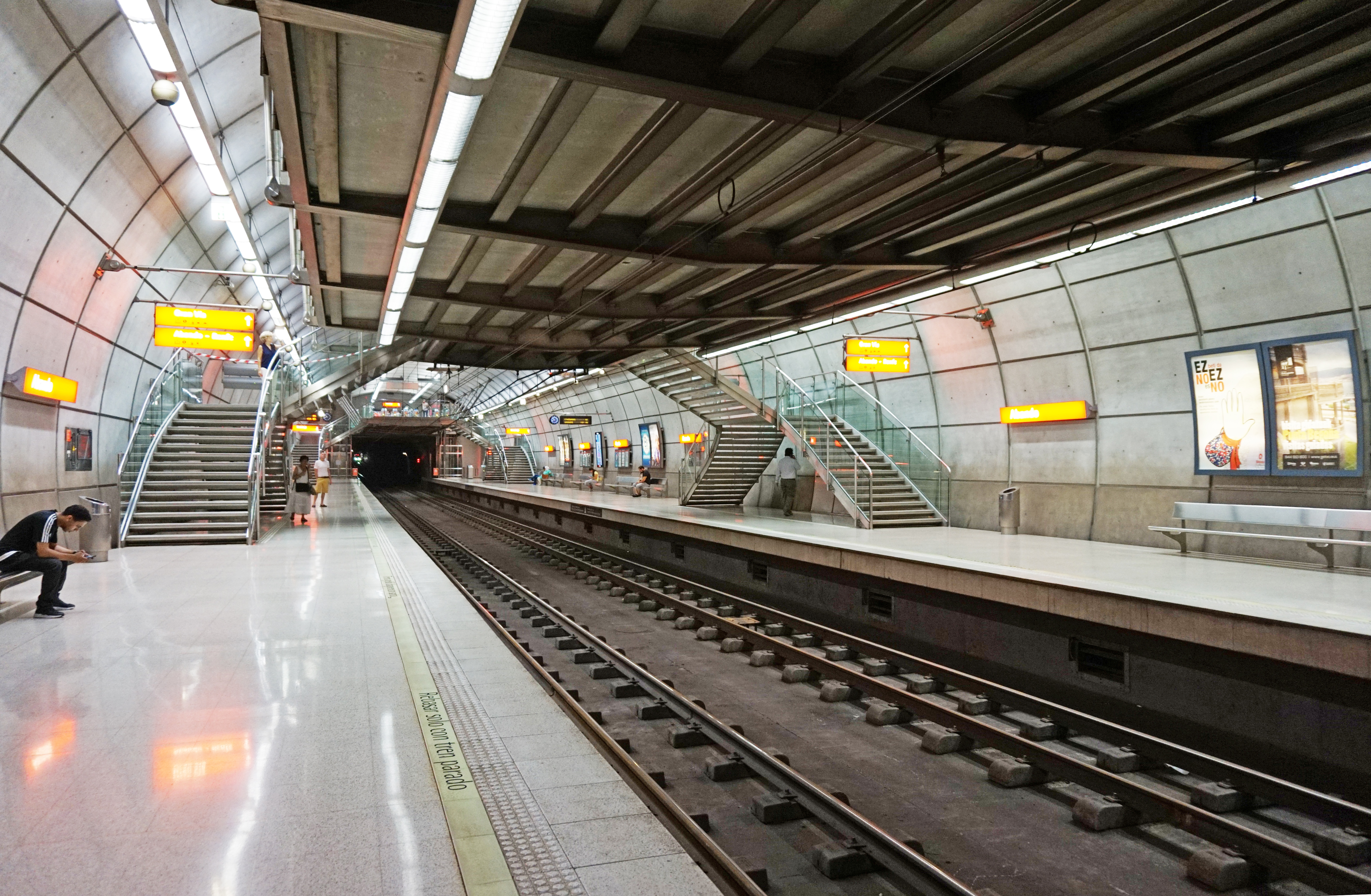
- Platforms and tracks

General information
- Location: 1 Gran Vía de Don Diego López de Haro; 48001 Bilbao; Spain
- Coordinates: 43°15′46″N 2°56′02″W
- Owner: Biscay Transport Consortium; Euskal Trenbide Sarea
- Lines: Line 1; Line 2
- Platforms: 2 side platforms
- Tracks: 2

Construction
- Structure type: Underground
- Platform levels: 1
- Parking: No
- Accessible: Yes

Other information
- Fare zone: Zone 1

History
- Opened: 11 November 1995

Passengers
- 2021: 4,292,719

Services
Preceding station	Metro Bilbao	Following station
Eliptikoa towards Plentzia	Line 1	Zazpikaleak/Casco Viejo towards Etxebarri
Eliptikoa towards Kabiezes	Line 2	Zazpikaleak/Casco Viejo towards Basauri
Location

Abando is a station on Lines 1 and 2 of the Bilbao Metro. The station is located in the neighborhood of Abando, in the district with the same name. The station is located close to Bilbao-Abando railway station, to which it is directly connected. It opened on 11 November 1995. It is one of the busiest stations in the network.

== Station layout ==
Abando station follows the typical cavern-shaped layout of most underground Metro Bilbao stations designed by Norman Foster, with the main hall located directly above the rail tracks.

=== Access ===
- 1 Gran Vía, Biribila Plaza (Gran Vía/Plaza Circular exit)
- Main hall of the Bilbao-Abando railway station (Abando - Renfe exit)
- 1 Berastegi St (Berastegi exit, closed during night time services)
- 1 Gran Vía (Gran Vía/Plaza Circular exit)

== Services ==
The station is served by Line 1 from Etxebarri to Ibarbengoa and Plentzia, and by Line 2 from Basauri to Kabiezes. The station is also served by local Bilbobus and regional Bizkaibus bus services.

The station is directly connected to Bilbao-Abando railway station, the main railway terminal in Bilbao. The Bilbao tram has a stop with the same name outside the station. It is also close to the narrow-gauge Bilbao-Concordia station.
