= Plaza Elíptica (disambiguation) =

Plaza Elíptica means "elliptical square" in Spanish. It may refer to:

- Plaza Elíptica, square in Bilbao, Spain
  - Eliptikoa (Bilbao Metro), Bilbao Metro station under the square.
- Plaza Elíptica (Madrid Metro), metro station in Madrid, Spain
