= Penitential Brotherhood of the Holy Eucharist =

The Penitential Brotherhood of the Holy Eucharist (Spanish: Cofradía Penitencial de la Santa Eucaristía), founded on May 6, 1959, is one of nine religious brotherhoods of the city of Bilbao that take part in its Holy Week. Bilbao is the most important place for the Holy Week in Spain in the northern part of the country, but not as well known as the Holy Week in Seville. It is canonically headquartered at the Jesuit School (Colegio Nuestra Señora de Begoña, Jesuitas-Indautxu), so it is popularly known as the Jesuit Brotherhood. It consists of current and former students, as well as family and friends, but also of people outside the school.

The Holy Eucharist organizes the procession of Nuestra Señora de la Amargura (Our Lady of Sorrow), which takes place on Easter Saturday in Bilbao through the streets of the central district of Indautxu, carrying the passion floats of Our Lady of Sorrow, Jesus tied to the column and The Calvary (Latin: Ecce mater tua).

In addition, this brotherhood is a carrier of other floats in different processions. On the Holy Thursday procession it carries during the float depicting the sacrament of the Last Supper (Juan Guraya, 1943) and in the afternoon of Good Friday it takes to the streets The Three Crosses (Quintín de Torre, 1945) in the procession of the Holy Burial.

== History ==
The Penitential Brotherhood of the Holy Eucharist is founded as such, with legal personality and its own statutes approved, on May 6, 1959, although it is true that, people from the Jesuit school of Indautxu had already been participating in the processions of Bilbao from 1940 as youth representatives of the Eucharistic Crusade of Indauchu, then led by Father José Julio Martínez, SJ.

At the same time, another large group of alumni participated in the processions of Holy Thursday and Good Friday as subsidiaries of the Cofradía de la Santa Vera Cruz de Bilbao.

It is because of the decade of the 50s when these two school groups came together to the processions, with a bond that tied them together: the Band of Bugles and Drums of the Eucharistic Crusade.

It was finally decided to reorganize and constitute the Brotherhood of the Holy Eucharist by integrating all the brothers: the Alumni of the Eucharistic Crusaders and their Band of Bugles and Drums. In 1959 and building the foundation of the brotherhood, appointing P. Izarra Perez, SJ Brother Abbot of Perpetual Honor, for his tireless work for many years in favor of the work by the brotherhood within the school.

From the date of the constitution of the Brotherhood is the Jesuit Brother Marcos the true driver of it. It was a time of great splendor for the development and settlement of the spirit that created the brotherhood.

It is in the 70s when a severe recession in the area, not only of this brotherhood, but of all the brotherhoods of Bilbao, reducing the number of brothers and activities to be performed, the result basically two aspects: devotional crisis won't change at Easter.

But when it was obvious the disappearance of brotherhood and even own their own processions, a new generation of young motivated enough, rekindle the flame, enrolling new brothers and actively participating in the liturgy and pastoral school.

During recent decades, the Brotherhood of the Holy Eucharist Penance has remained a regular in both the number of active brothers and benefactors, as in the activities, even to organize since the 90s its own procession on Saturday Passion, with the difficulty that entails, but being clothed by other brotherhoods of the town.
