= Our Lady of Begoña College, Bilbao =

Coordinates: 43.2610°N 2.9434°W

- Colegio Nuestra Señora de Begoña
- Indautxu, Bilbao, Spain

Information
- Type: Jesuit, Catholic
- Established: 1921; 105 years ago
- Grades: Primary through baccalaureate
- Gender: Coeducational
- Website: Our Lady of Begoña College
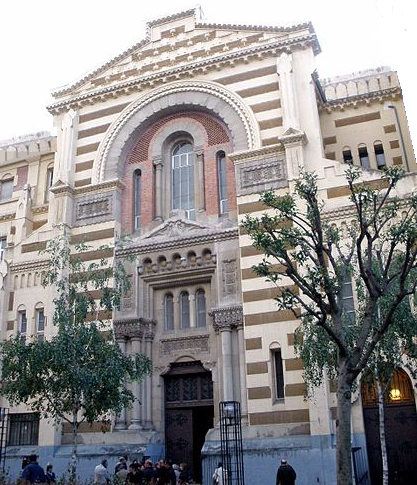
- Our Lady of Begoña college church

Our Lady of Begoña College, Bilbao, Spain, was founded by the Society of Jesus in 1921 and now includes primary through baccalaureate.

== History ==
In 1921 Our Lady of Begoña school opened at Allende Villa. The next year construction of a proper school building began, and Our Lady of Begña church was added in 1930. The pavilion "Diaz de Haro" came in 1940 and in 1946 a science building. In 1951 the area changed with the opening of Calle Simón Bolívar. Then in 1960 the block of Indautxu was built along with the sports pavilion "Areiza".

== See also ==
- List of Jesuit sites
