= Indautxu =

Coordinates: 43°15′38″N 2°56′27″W

- Quarter
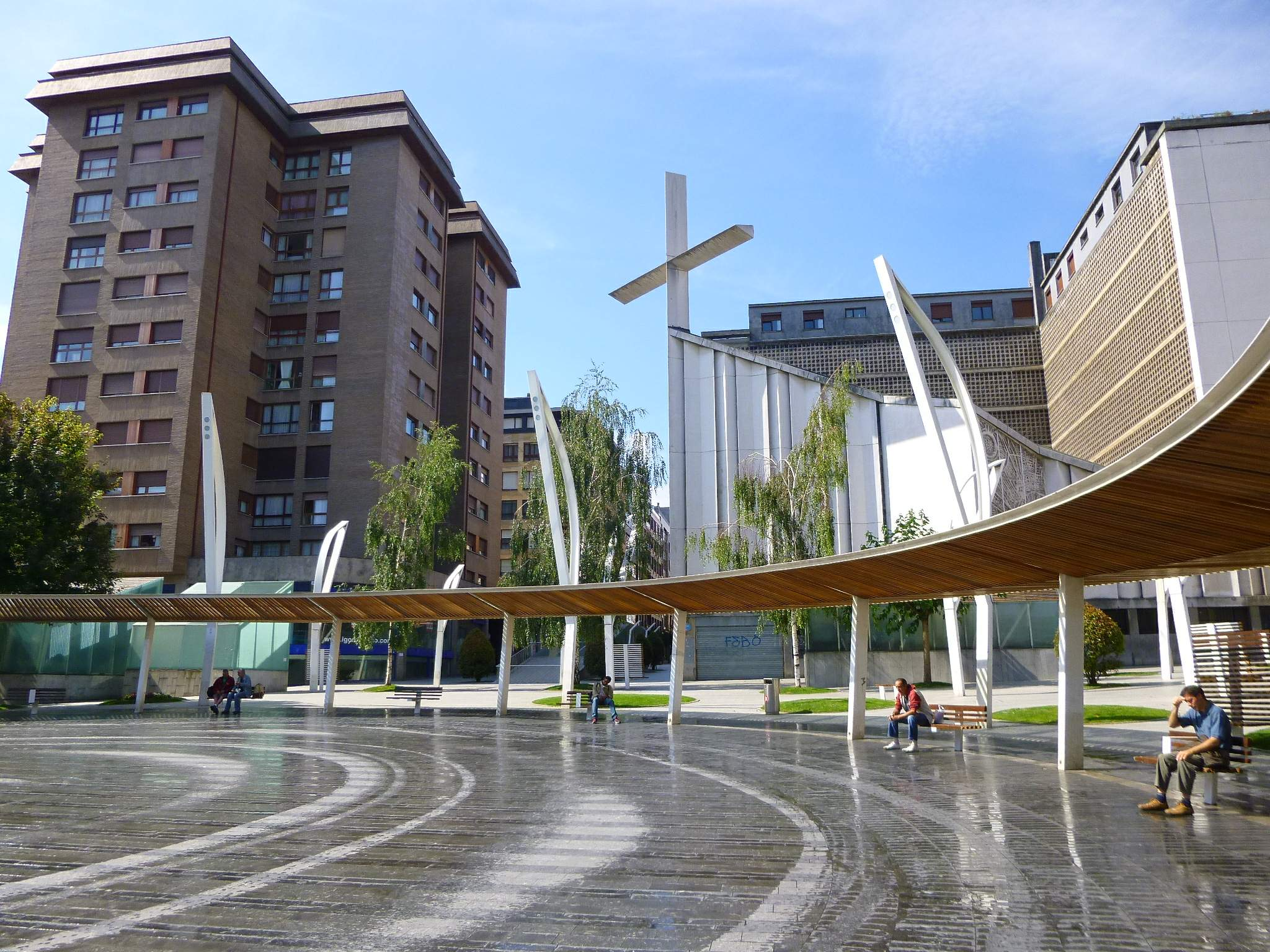
- Indautxu Plaza

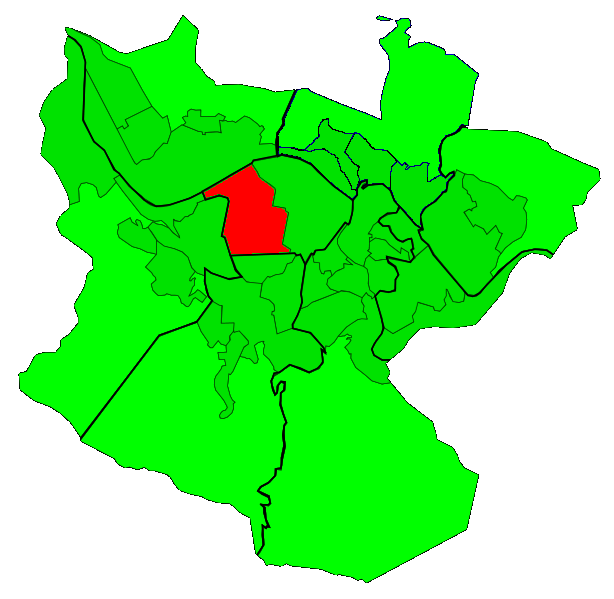
- Location of Indautxu within Bilbao
- Country: Spain
- Autonomous community: Basque Country
- Province: Biscay
- Comarca: Greater Bilbao
- Municipality: Bilbao

Population (2018)
  - Total: 27,277

Indautxu is a quarter of central Bilbao, Basque Country (Spain), located in the district of Abando. It is a relatively affluent neighbourhood and is most famous for the large number of private hospitals and clinics, the large Society of Jesus school and the Doña Casilda Iturrizar park, all located in the area.

== History ==
Indautxu was a predominantly rural area of the former elizate of Abando until its annexation to the city of Bilbao in 1870. Starting in the late 19th century, and as the influence of neighbouring city of Bilbao grew bigger with the construction of the ensanche in former Abando lands, Indautxu began to be populated by wealthy families coming from the industrial bourgeoisie of the province, giving way to the construction of many villas. In 1907 Indautxu was finally integrated into Bilbao's urban fabric as part of its ensanche.

In 1918 the city opened the Monumental School of Indautxu, the largest public school of the city at the moment with room for more than 800 children. In 1924 the SD Indautxu, the local football team, was founded. During the decades of 1950 and 1960 Indautxu experimented a substantial population growth which amidst a real estate speculation caused the demolition of most of its historical villas and the construction of large apartment buildings on their place. By the beginning of the 21st century, very few remained.

== Geography ==
Indautxu is located on the left bank of the estuary of Bilbao, in a large plain. Like the rest of the Abando district, is one of the few completely flat quarters of the city. Indautxu borders the district of Deusto to the north across the river, Basurto-Zorroza to the west, Errekalde to the south and the quarter of Abando to the east.

=== Parks and open spaces ===
The main park of the quarter is the Doña Casilda Iturrizar park, a historical park of the city located in close proximity to the quarter's northern border by the river. The park is home to many fountains and ponds. Alongside this park, and by the river, is the riverbank park (Basque: Erribera Parkea). The Indautxu Plaza has traditionally been the central public point of the quarter, alongside the Arriquibar Plaza, located by the Azkuna Zentroa, and the Bizkaia Plaza.

== Demographics ==
Indautxu has a population of 27,277 as of 2018, from which immigrants represent 4.9% of the total. People under the age of 19 represented 16.1% of the total, while the largest age bracket was that of between 20 and 64, representing 56.7%.

== Culture ==
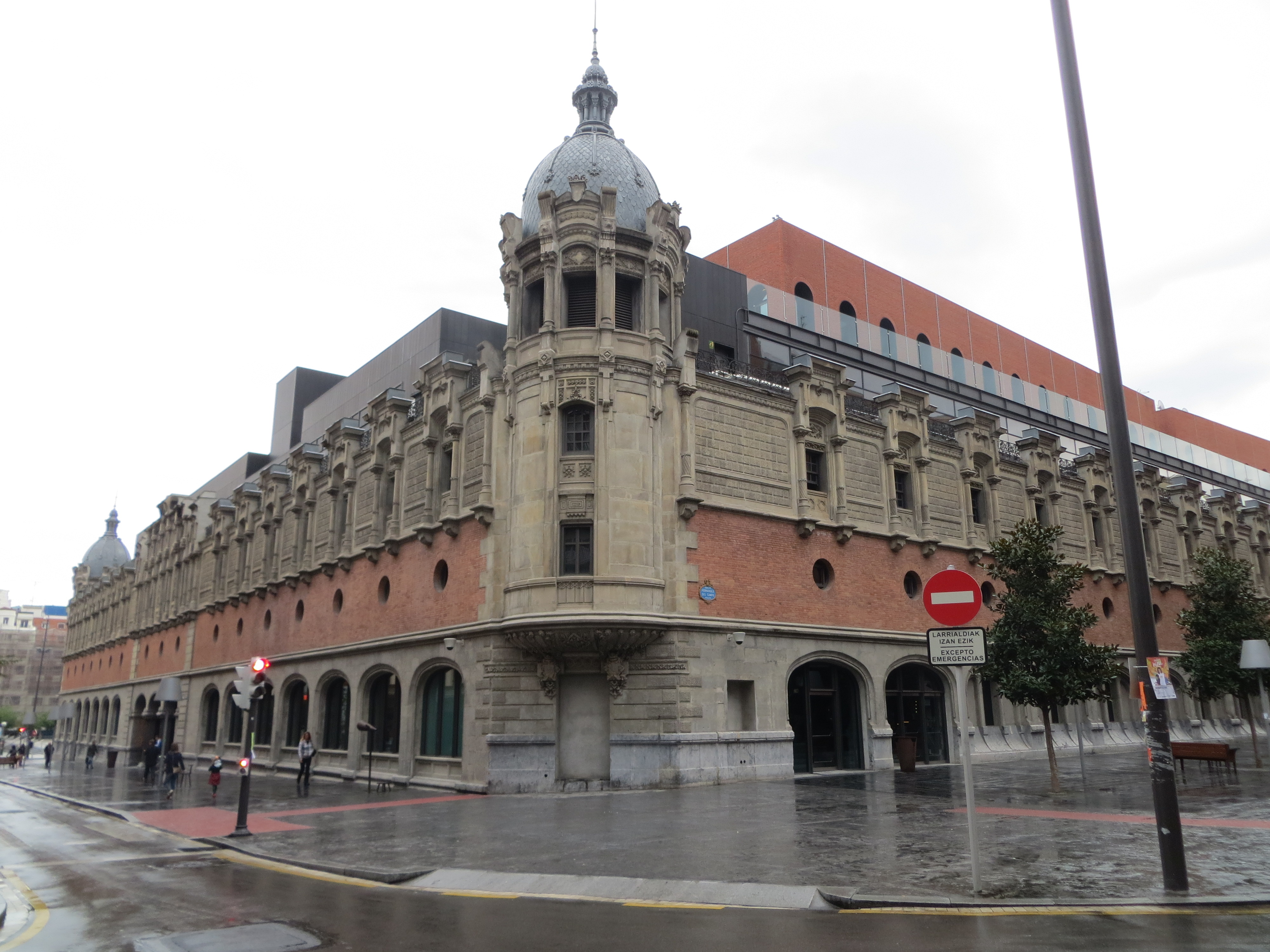
The Azkuna Zentroa.

Indautxu is home to wide variety of museums and entertainment venues. The Euskalduna Conference Centre and Concert Hall is located in the northern side of the quarter, by the estuary and in the place of the former Euskalduna shipyards. The concert hall organises a wide variety of cultural activities including theatre, ballet, concerts and opera. It also houses the Bilbao Symphony Orchestra. The Azkuna Zentroa, designed by Philippe Starck is a culture and leisure centre located in the grounds of the former city corn exchange. It houses art exhibitions and cultural events, and it includes a fitness centre, a cinema multiplex libraries, showrooms and a large auditorium. The Maritime Museum of Bilbao, Itsasmuseum, is located by the river in the northwestern section of the quarter.

The quarter also hosts the Bilbao Fine Arts Museum, the second most visited museum of the Basque Country, only behind the Guggenheim museum. It houses a comprehensive collection of Basque and European art from the Middle Ages to contemporary times. The museum is located in the Euskadi Plaza and by the Doña Casilda Iturrizar park. Also in the quarter is the Benedicto Museum, that hosts the collection of Spanish painter Benedicto Martinez.

The local football team is the SD Indautxu, founded in 1924. During the 1950s it played in the Spanish second division, while it currently plays in the Basque regional division. Its home field is the Iparralde, located in the neighbouring district of Basurto-Zorroza.

The local festivities honour Our Lady of Mount Carmel and are celebrated every summer between 15 and 16 of July.

== Infrastructure ==
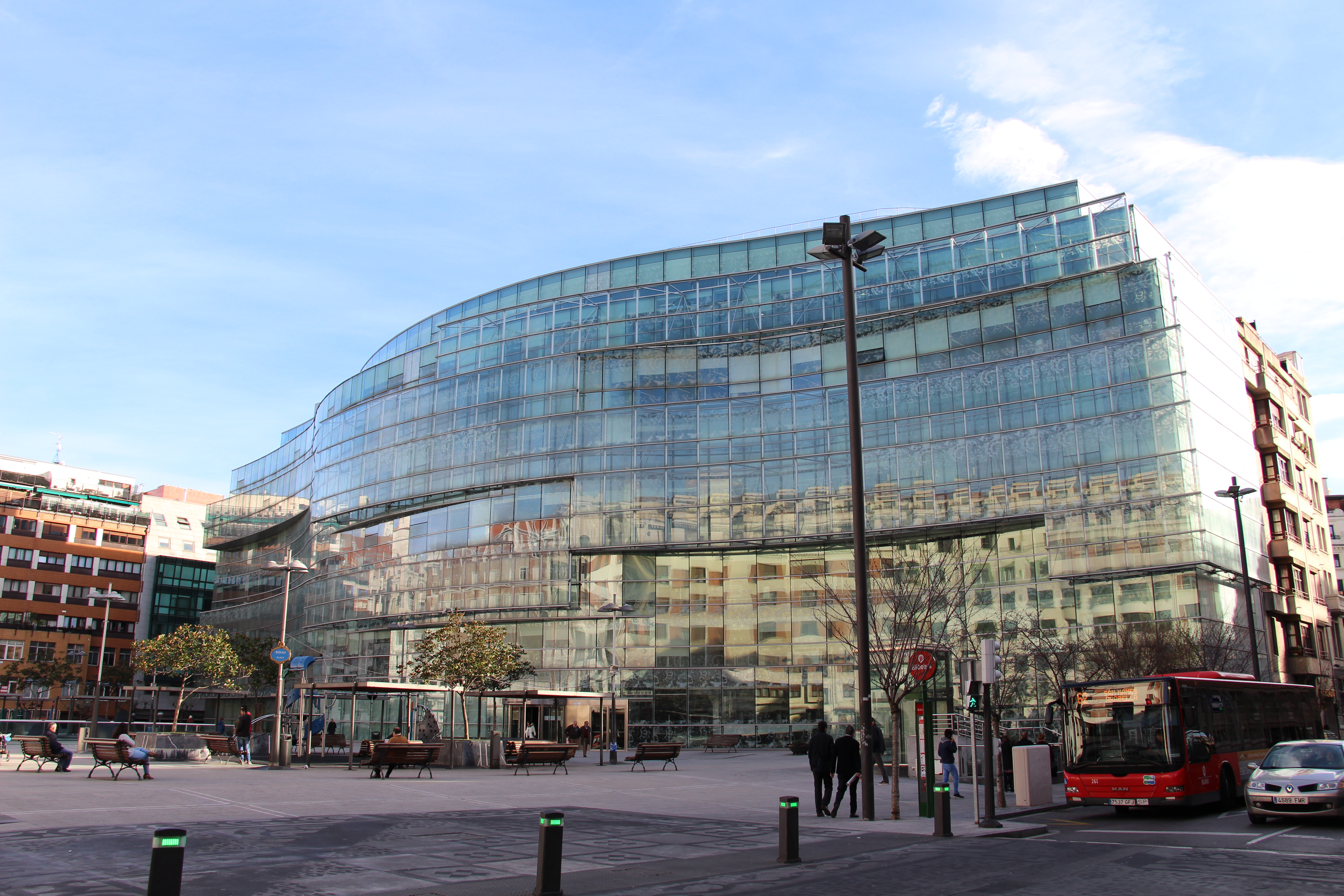
Bizkaia Government building.

Indautxu has several public and private healthcare facilities. These include the Indautxu public health centre and the Bombero Etxaniz healthcare centre, both part of the Osakidetza network. Private facilities include the Indautxu Clinic, founded in 1954.

The quarter also contains several public institutions. Among them are the Regional Service of Ports of Biscay and Zuzenean, the public service offices of the Basque Government. At Plaza Elíptica, near the border with Abando, is the regional Treasury Department delegation of the Spanish government. A delegation of the Biscayan regional government is also located in the quarter, in a glass building at Bizkaia Plaza.

Indautxu is served by numerous Bilbobus routes connecting it with the rest of the city, as well as by several regional Bizkaibus lines. The Indautxu station of the Bilbao Metro is located by Indautxu Plaza. The northern end of the quarter is served by the Euskalduna stop of the Bilbao tram, on Abandoibarra Avenue and close to the estuary.

== Sights ==
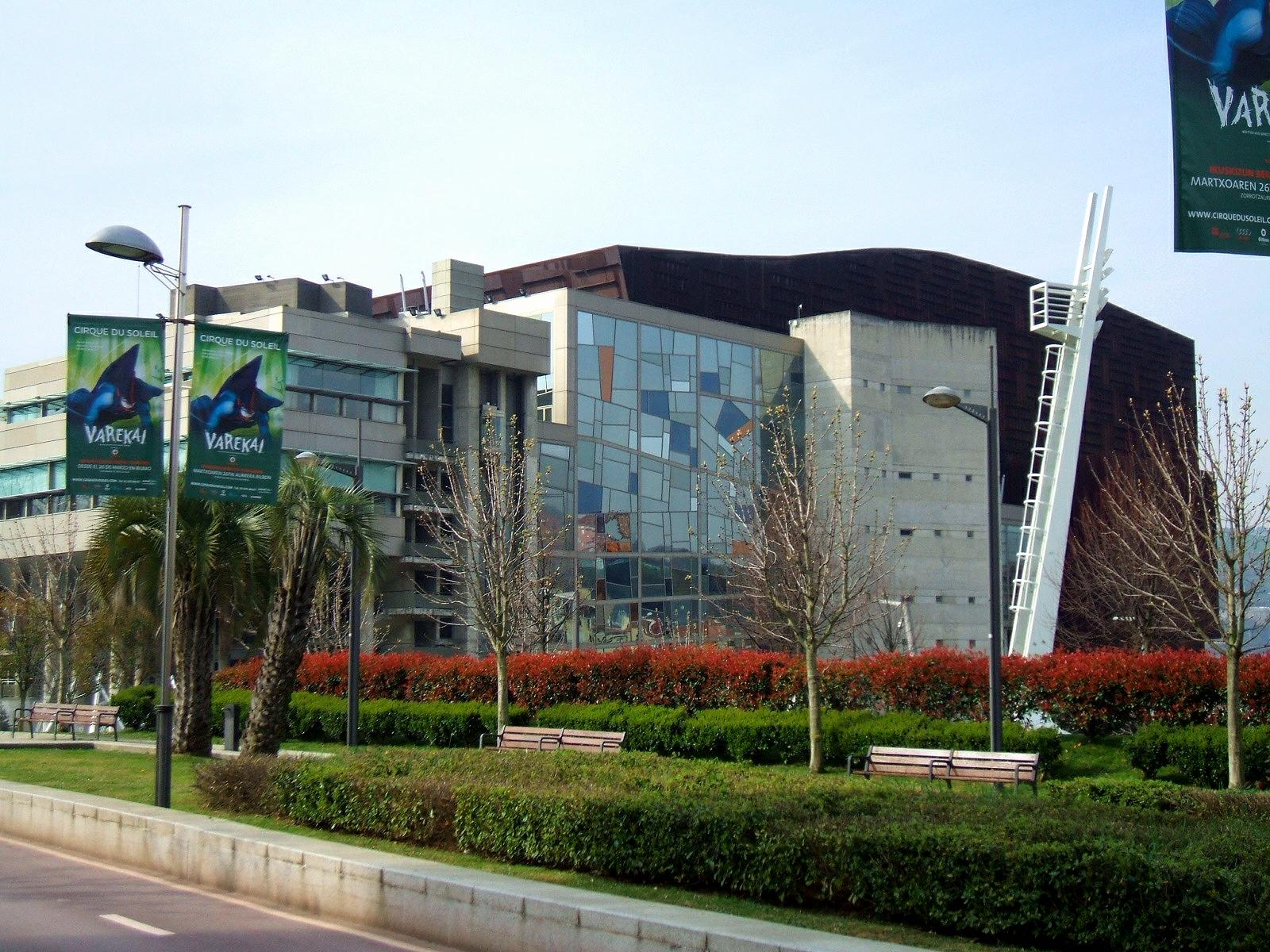
Euskalduna Conference and Concert Hall

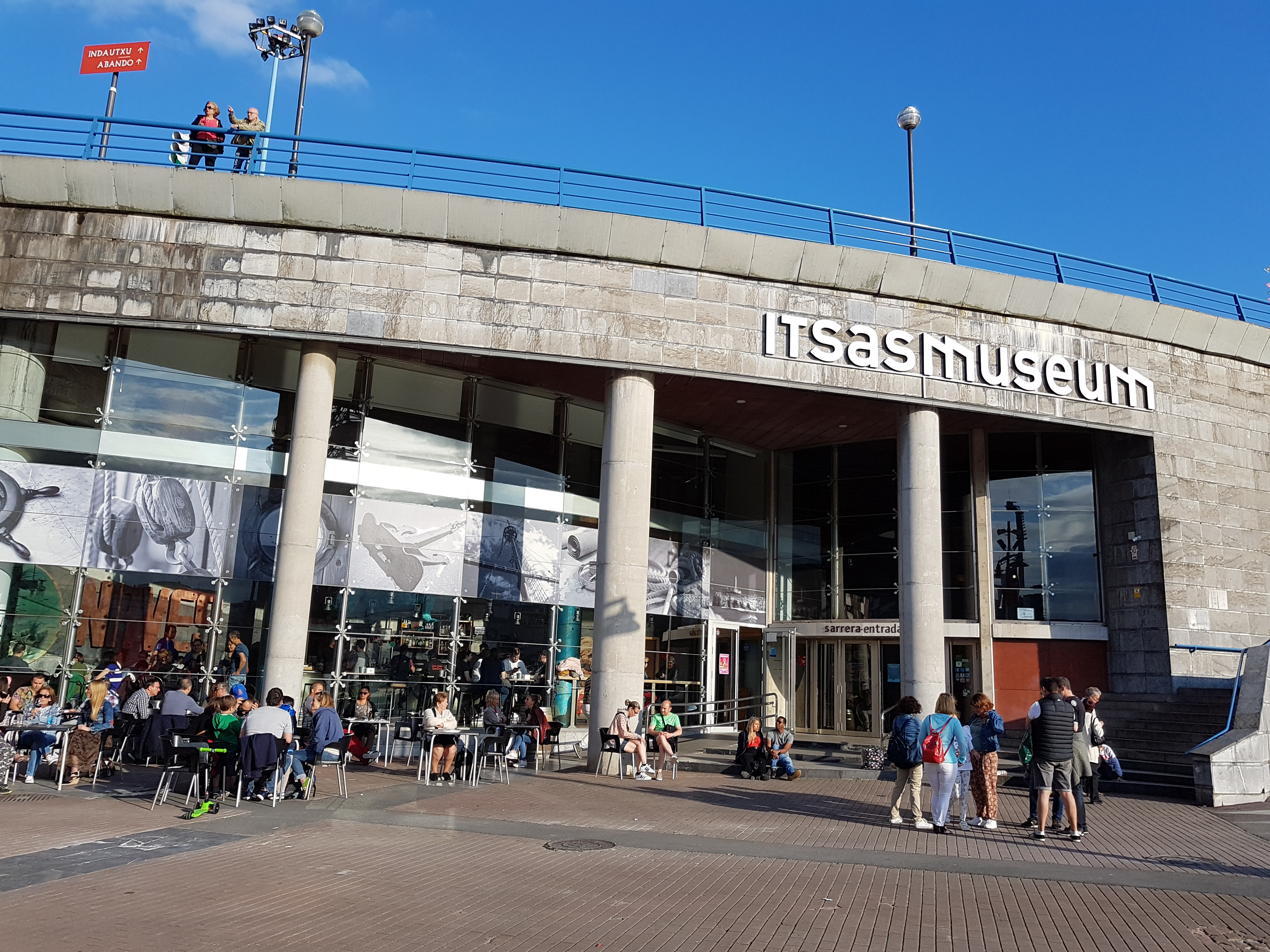
Itsasmuseum - Maritime Museum

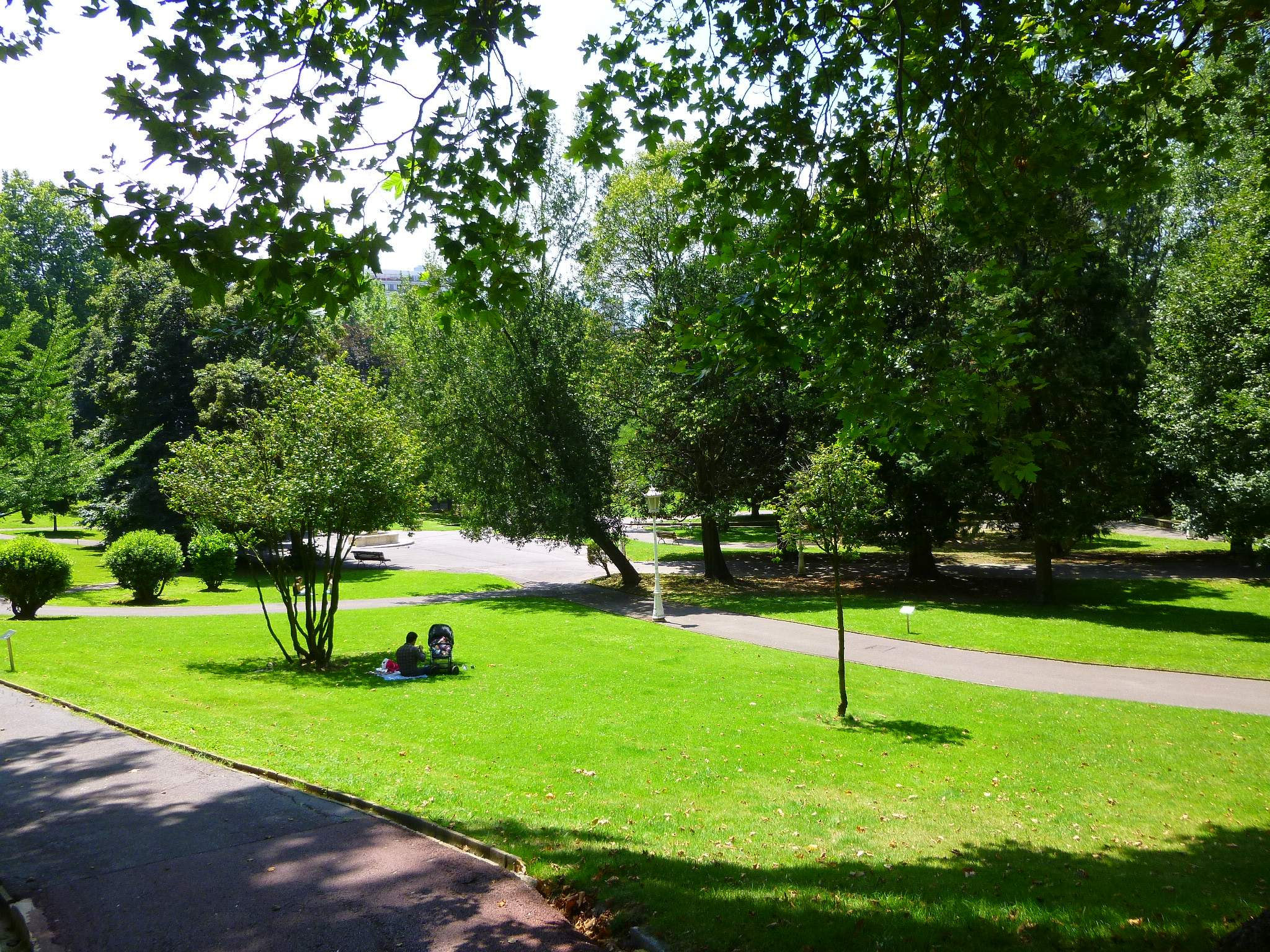
Doña Casilda Iturrizar park

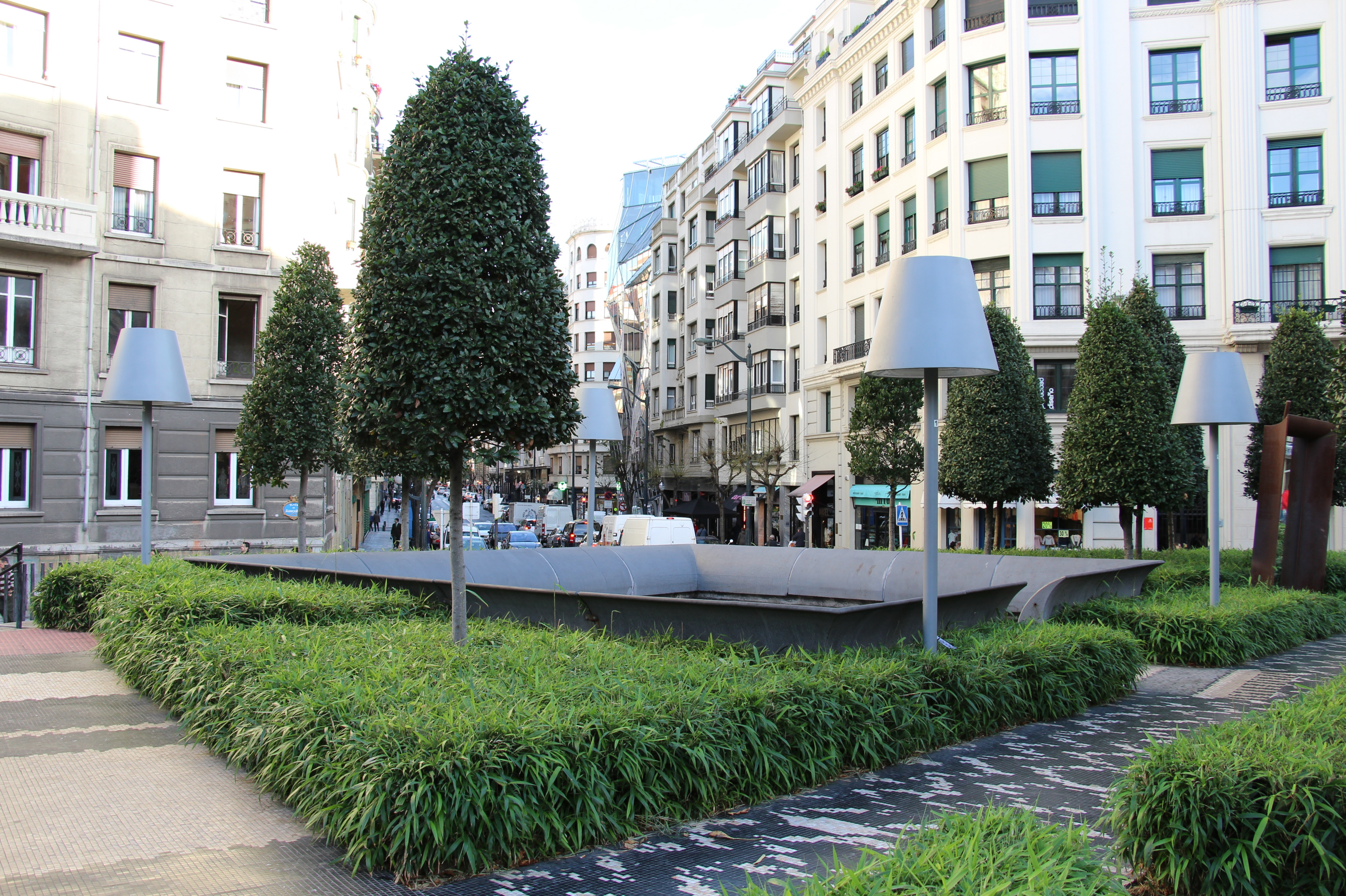
Arriquibar Plaza

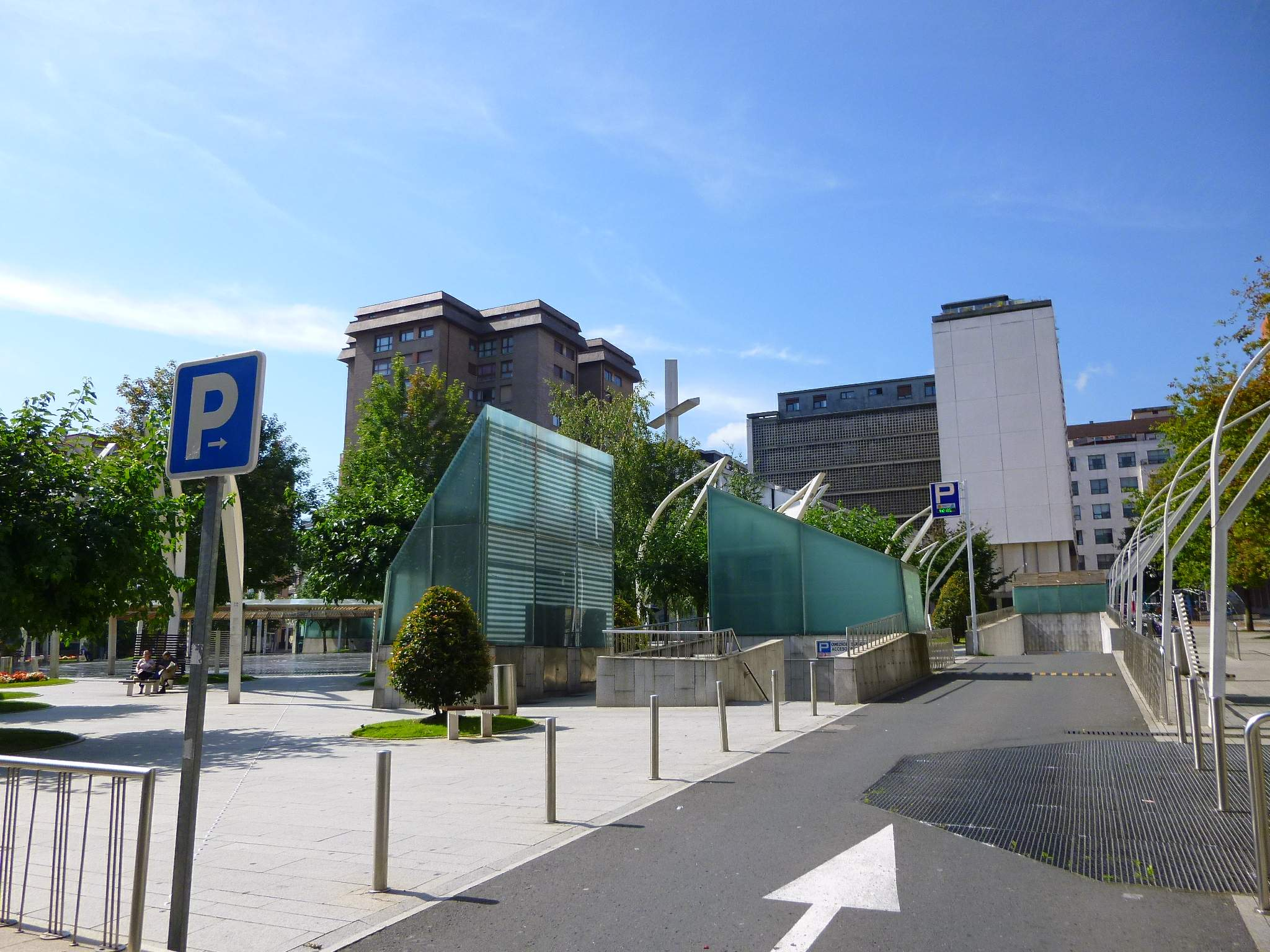
Indautxu Plaza

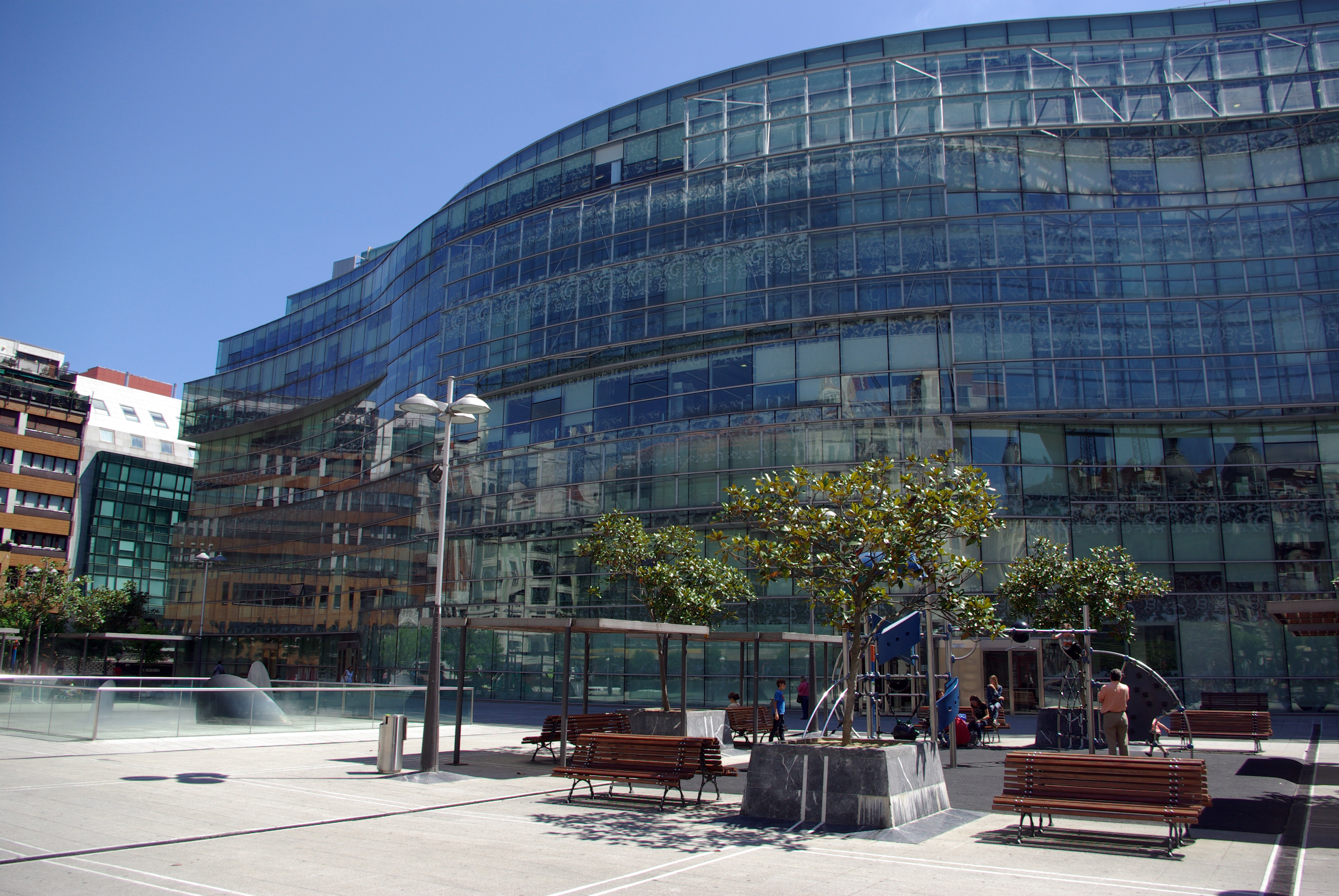
Bizkaia Plaza

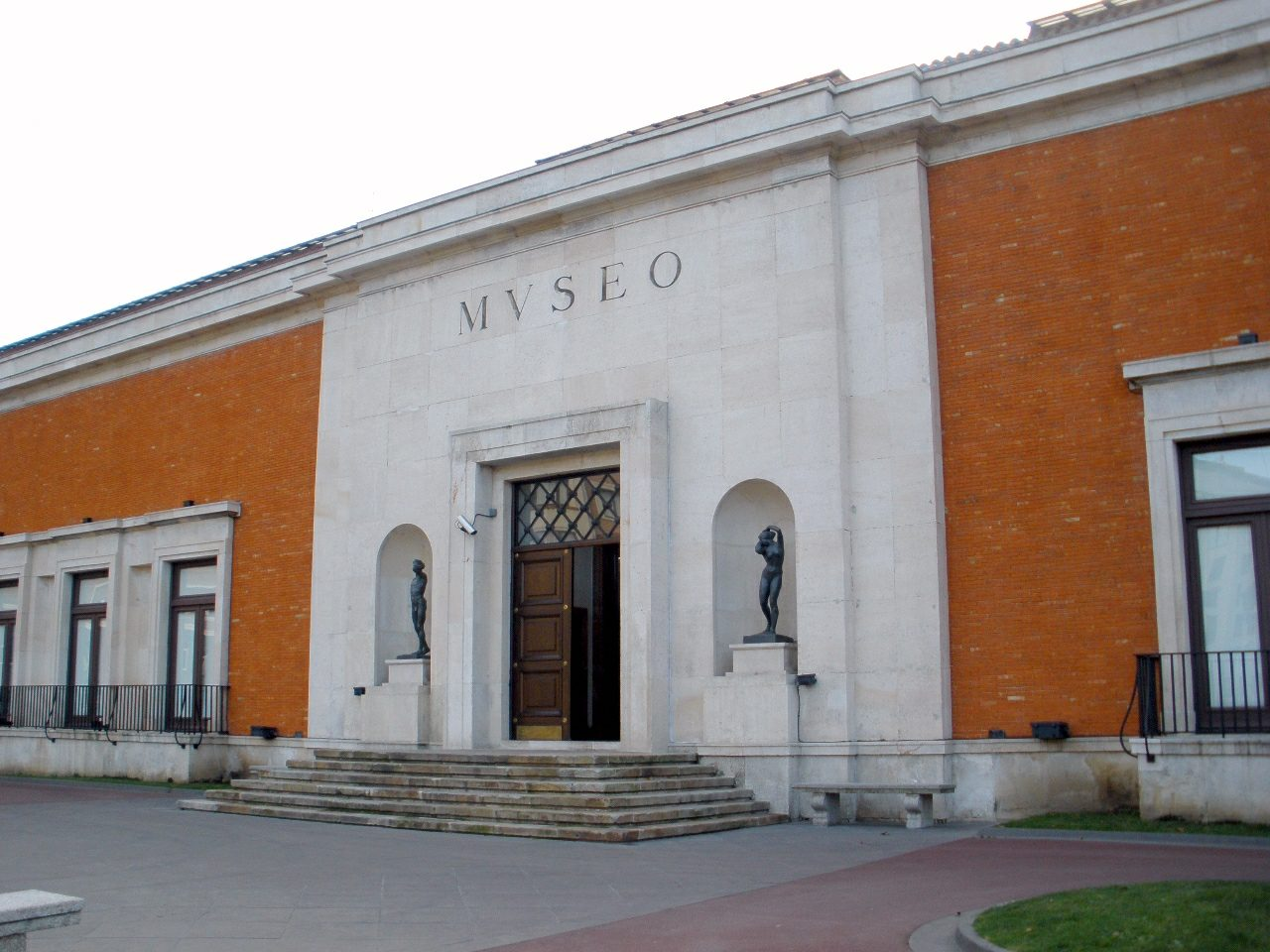
Fine Arts Museum
