= Abando =

Coordinates: 43°15′41″N 2°55′38″W

- District
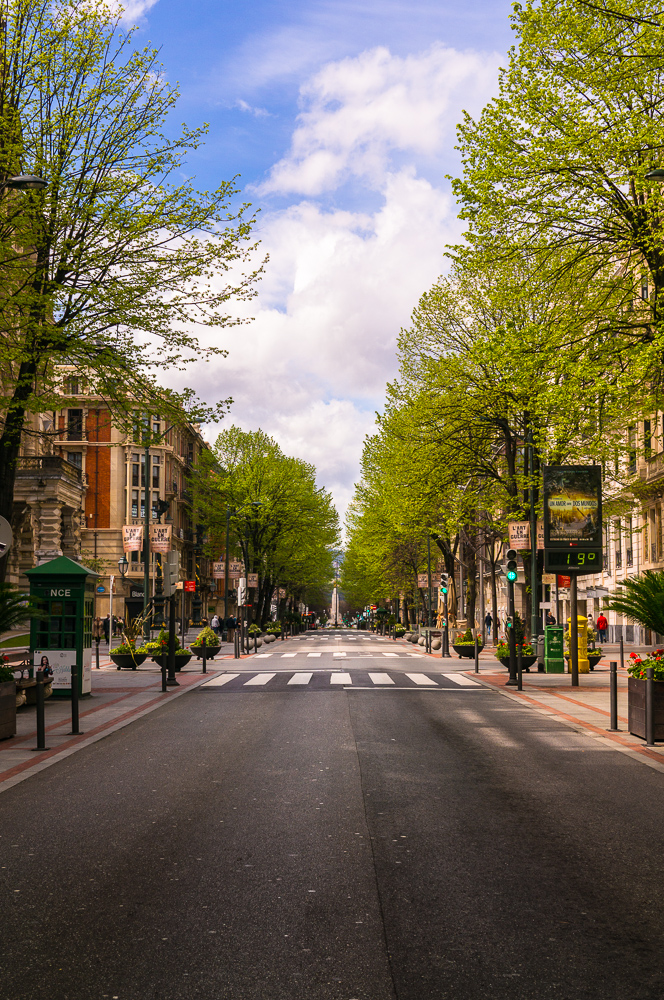
- Gran Vía de Don Diego López de Haro

- Location of Abando within Bilbao
- Country: Spain
- Autonomous community: Basque Country
- Province: Biscay
- Comarca: Greater Bilbao
- Municipality: Bilbao

Area
  - Total: 2.14 km^{2} (0.83 sq mi)

Population (2016)
  - Total: 50,903
  - Density: 23,800/km^{2} (61,600/sq mi)

Abando, formerly known as San Vicente de Abando, is one of the eight districts of Bilbao, Basque Country (Spain). It covers most of the city's centre, located on the left bank of the estuary of Bilbao. It is the only district of Bilbao with all of its land completely urbanised. Abando was originally an elizate and also a municipality until 1876, when part of it was annexed to Bilbao, the rest of the elizate's municipal land was integrated into Bilbao in 1890. In 2016 the population was 50,903. Abando is the wealthiest district in Bilbao, with personal and family incomes being well above the citywide average.

== History ==
Coat of arms of the former elizate of Abando.

The exact date of Abando's foundation is unknown, as is the case with other elizates in Biscay. In 1300, the town of Bilbao was founded by Diego López V de Haro on the site of a small settlement on the right bank of the estuary. Its rights as a town were later confirmed by King Ferdinand V of Castile. The charter included jurisdiction over lands on the other side of the San Antón Bridge, an area then known as Allende la Puente and now as Bilbao la Vieja, which had originally belonged to Abando.

During the 18th century, Abando became the most populous elizate in Biscay, with about 2,100 inhabitants. The population was distributed among several rural neighbourhoods, made up largely of farmhouses, or baserriak. These neighbourhoods included Bilbao la Vieja, Ibarra, Mena-Urizar-Larrasquitu, Elejaberri, Olaveaga, Zorroza and Ibaizabal. In 1835, during the First Carlist War, siege weapons and artillery used in the siege of Bilbao were stored in the sacristy of the San Vicente church in Abando.

The railway reached Abando in 1863, with the opening of the line to Urduña. The line was built to connect Bilbao and Biscay with Castile, and was later extended to Castejón. Its construction led to the creation of the Bilbao-Tudela Railway Company, which built a terminus station in Abando. The Irish engineer Charles Blacker Vignoles worked on the project. In 1878, the company was absorbed by the Compañía de los Caminos de Hierro del Norte, or Northern Railways Company, which took over the station.

By the 19th century, Bilbao had become congested and required additional land for urban expansion. In 1870, part of Abando was annexed to the city in order to begin the construction of an ensanche, or planned expansion. The full annexation of the elizate took place in 1890. The expansion plan prepared by the architects Alzola, Achúcarro and Hoffmeyer was approved in 1876. It envisaged Abando as the modern centre of Bilbao, with broad straight boulevards laid out on a grid, the principal one being the Gran Vía de Don Diego López de Haro. This new urban pattern contrasted with the narrow and irregular streets of the Casco Viejo, Bilbao's old town.

Sabino Arana, the founder of Basque nationalism and of the Basque Nationalist Party, was born in Abando in 1865, when it was still a separate municipality.

The present districts of Abando, Errekalde and Basurto occupy much of the territory of the former elizate. In recent decades, the northern part of the district has been redeveloped as Abandoibarra, meaning "Abando's shore". This former industrial area along the Estuary of Bilbao now includes the Guggenheim Bilbao Museum, the Euskalduna Palace and several recreational and residential developments, including the Isozaki Atea towers. The district is now one of Bilbao's main financial and commercial areas.

== Geography ==
Abando is located on the left bank of the estuary of Bilbao, in a large plain. Abando borders to the north with the estuary, across of which are located the districts of Uribarri and Deusto. To the east are the districts of Deusto and Basurto-Zorroza and to the south the districts of Errekalde and Ibaiondo, district which Abando also borders to the west. It covers an area of 2.14 square kilometres or 0.82 square miles.

=== Subdivisions ===
Politically and administratively, the district of Abando is divided into two quarters (Basque: auzo), Abando proper and Indautxu.

Map / Name; / Abando

Map / Name; / Indautxu

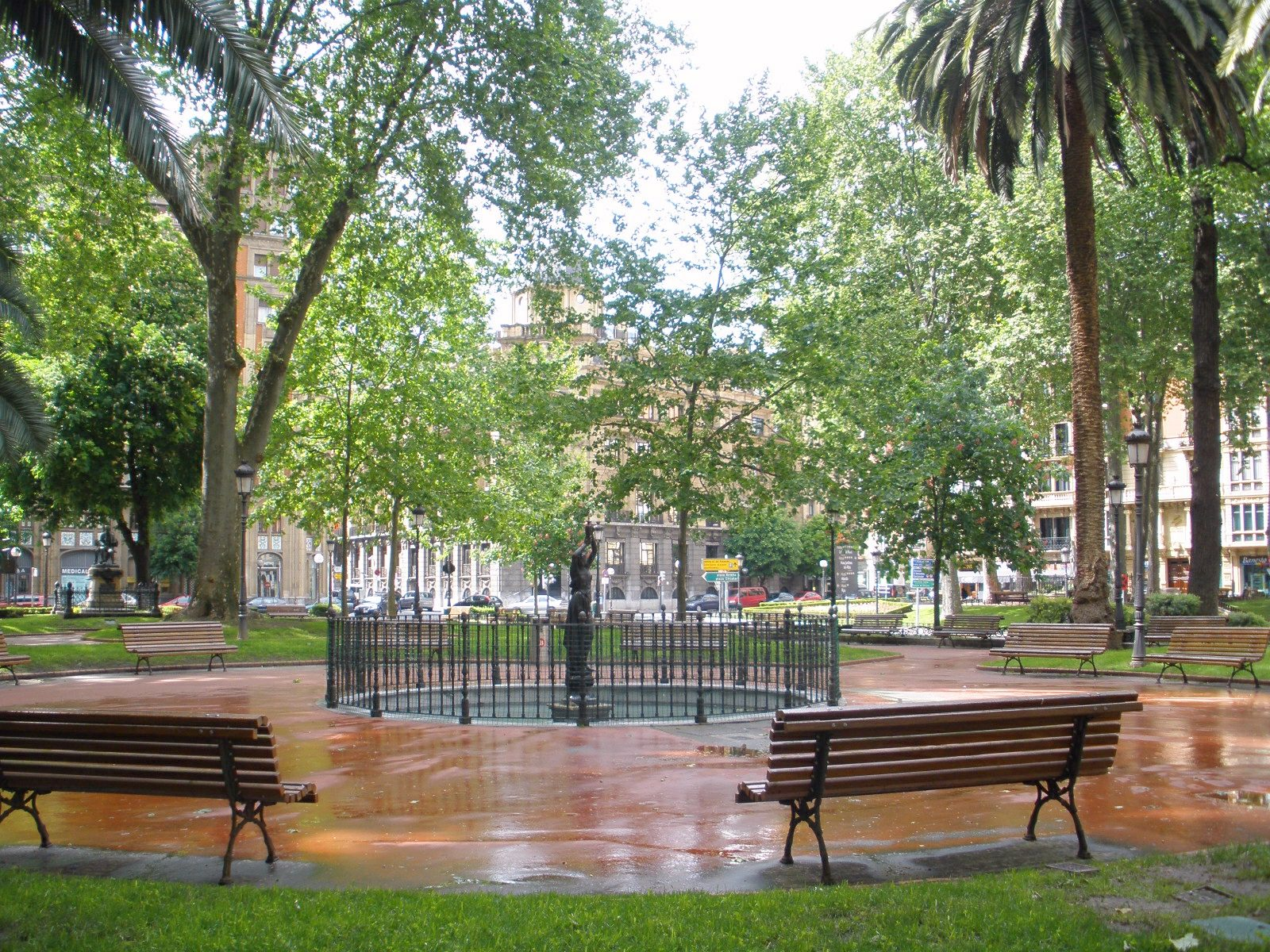
The Albia Gardens are located in Abando.

=== Parks and gardens ===
The district of Abando is home to many of the most centric green spaces of the city. The Doña Casilda Iturrizar park is one of the largest in the city, with around 8.5 hectares of green spaces and fountains. Across Abandoibarra many of the former industrial sites and shipyards were replaced with open and green spaces, many of which are located in the surroundings of the Guggenheim museum. They include the Plaza Euskadi, the Republic of Abando park and the riverbank park (Basque: Erribera parkea) by the river Bilbao. Other relevant parks and open spaces include the Albia gardens, the Plaza Elíptica and the Birbila Plaza.

== Demographics ==
In 2017 Abando had a population of 51,622 people, out of which 15.6% were children under the age of 18, and 26% were 65 years old or older. In 2015 5.8% were immigrants.

== Economy ==
Abando is the economic centre of Bilbao. It acts as the central shopping and business district of the city, particularly in the surroundings of the Gran Vía de Don Diego López de Haro, which serves as the main avenue of the city. Alongside the many shops and business buildings, located in Abando are the headquarters of BBVA, a multinational banking group as well as Kutxabank. Also located in Abando are important commercial centres such as El Corte Inglés and Zubiarte. During the industrial period of the city and until the mid-1990s, the riverside area of Abando was home of the city docks and important ship construction companies, such as the now disappeared Euskalduna.

== Transport ==
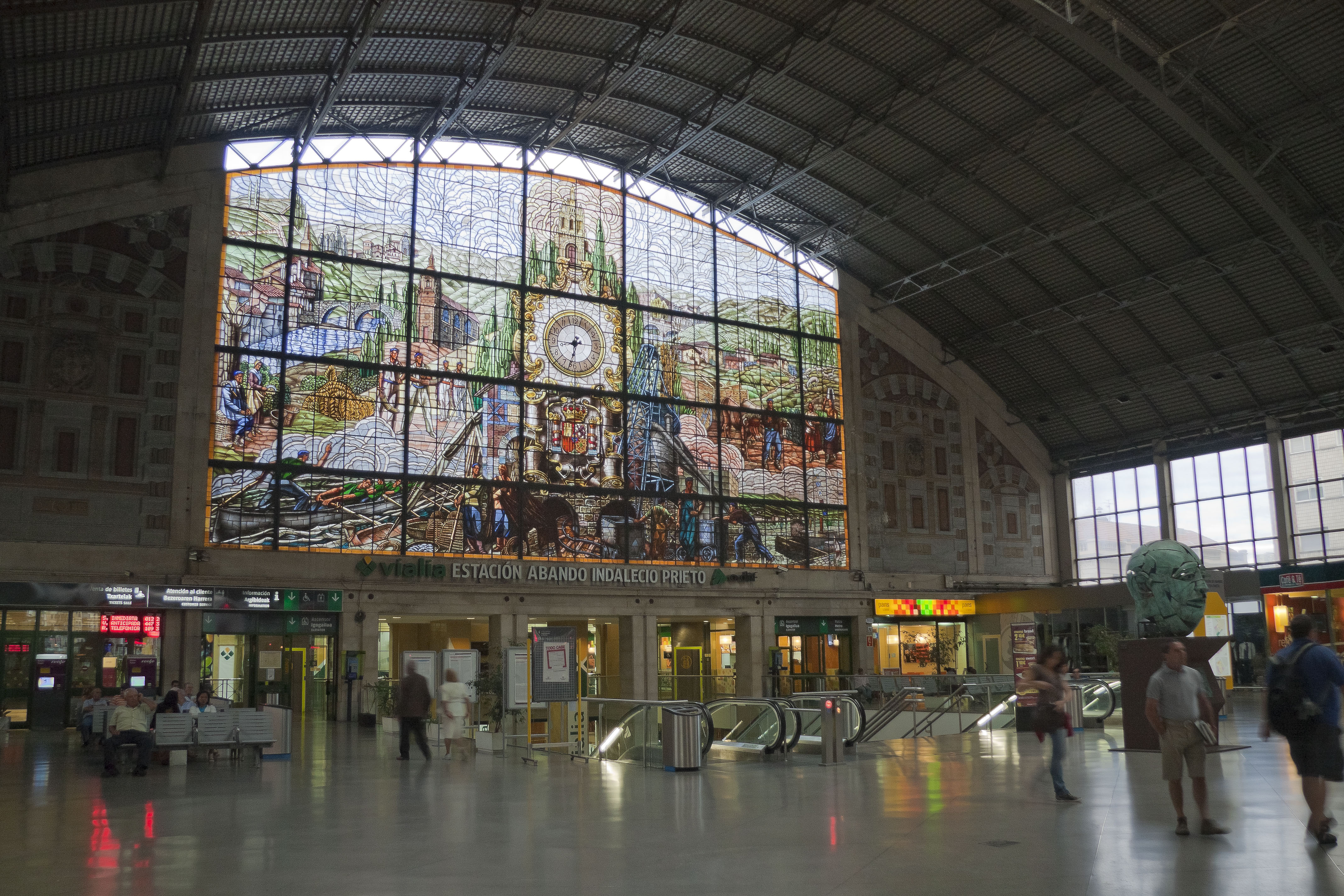
Bilbao-Abando railway station.

Abando is the location of the Bilbao-Abando railway station, the largest train station in Bilbao, with long-distance passenger trains operated by Renfe to Galicia, Madrid and Barcelona as well as intercity services to Miranda de Ebro. Bilbao-Abando is also the terminus station for the commuter-rail network Cercanías Bilbao with frequent services to Santurtzi, Muskiz and Urduña. This station is also connected to the Bilbao tram services and Bilbao Metro Lines 1 and 2. Also located in Abando is the Bilbao-Concordia station, operated by Renfe, with local services to Balmaseda and Karrantza as well as intercity services to Santander and León.

The Bilbao Metro has three stations located in the district, which are Abando, Eliptikoa and Indautxu, the three of which are served by Line 1 and Line 2. The tramway line operated by Euskotren Tranbia has seven stations in the district: Abando, Pío Baroja, Uribitarte, Guggenheim, Abandoibarra, Euskalduna and Sabino Arana. The district is served by numerous Bilbobus lines that connect Abando with other districts across the city, the main stops are located in the Plaza Elíptica and in the Gran Vía by the Birbila Plaza. Also in the Plaza Elíptica and by the train station there are Bizkaibus stops that include direct services to Bilbao Airport and other municipalities across Biscay.

The district has seven bridges crossing the estuary of Bilbao and the main streets are the Gran Vía de Don Diego López de Haro, which is considered the main avenue of the city. It crosses the district transversally connecting the Biribila Plaza, where it intersects with the Hurtado de Amézaga street to Errekalde; the Plaza Elíptica, intersecting there with the Recalde Boulevard to the Abandoibarra area; and the Sagrado Corazón Plaza, crossing there with the Sabino Arana Avenue towards Basurto-Zorroza and the Euskalduna Bridge to Deusto. Also relevant are the Abandoibarra Avenue by the estuary and the Urquijo Boulevard in the Indautxu area.

== Sights ==
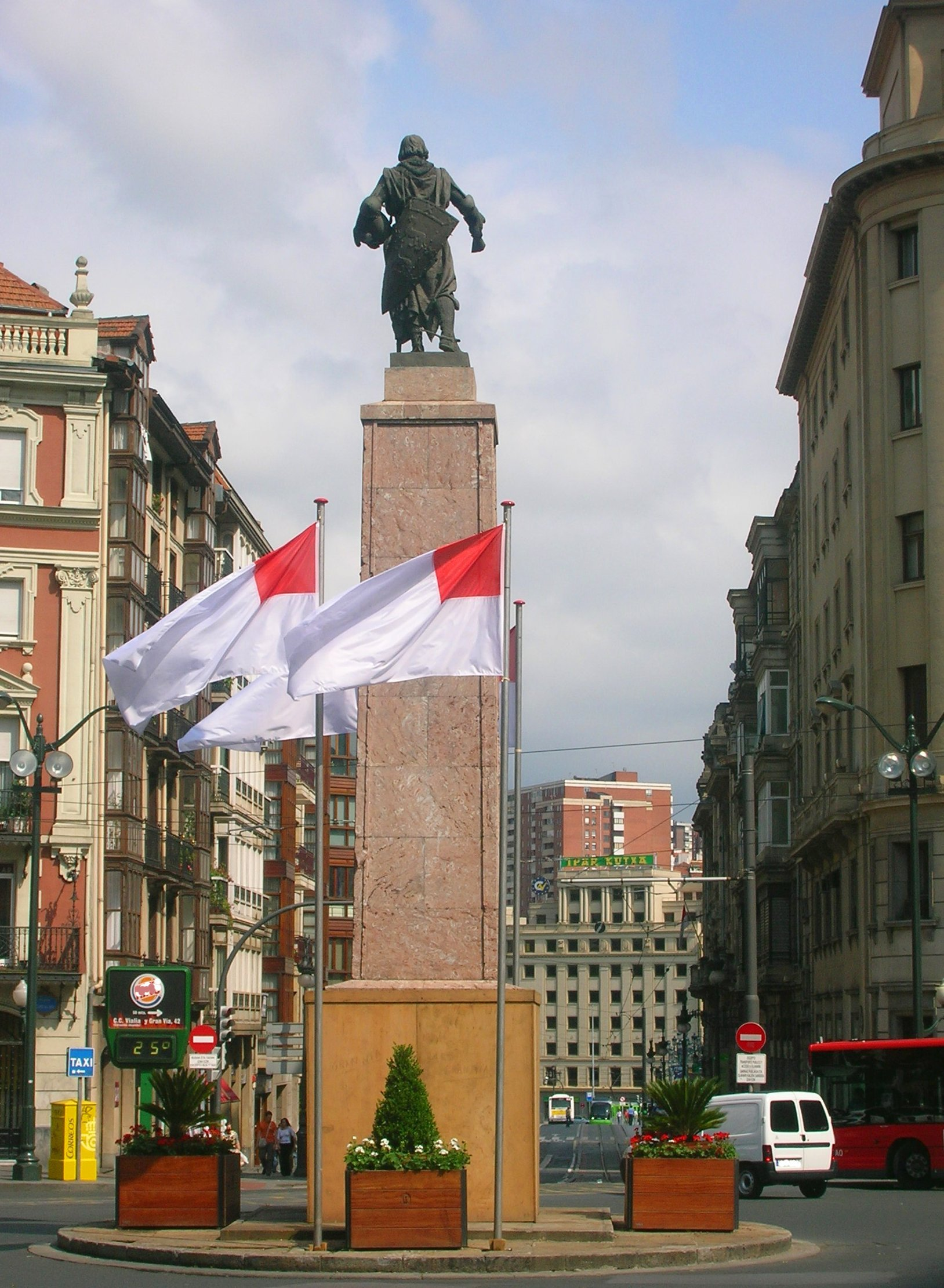
Biribila Plaza

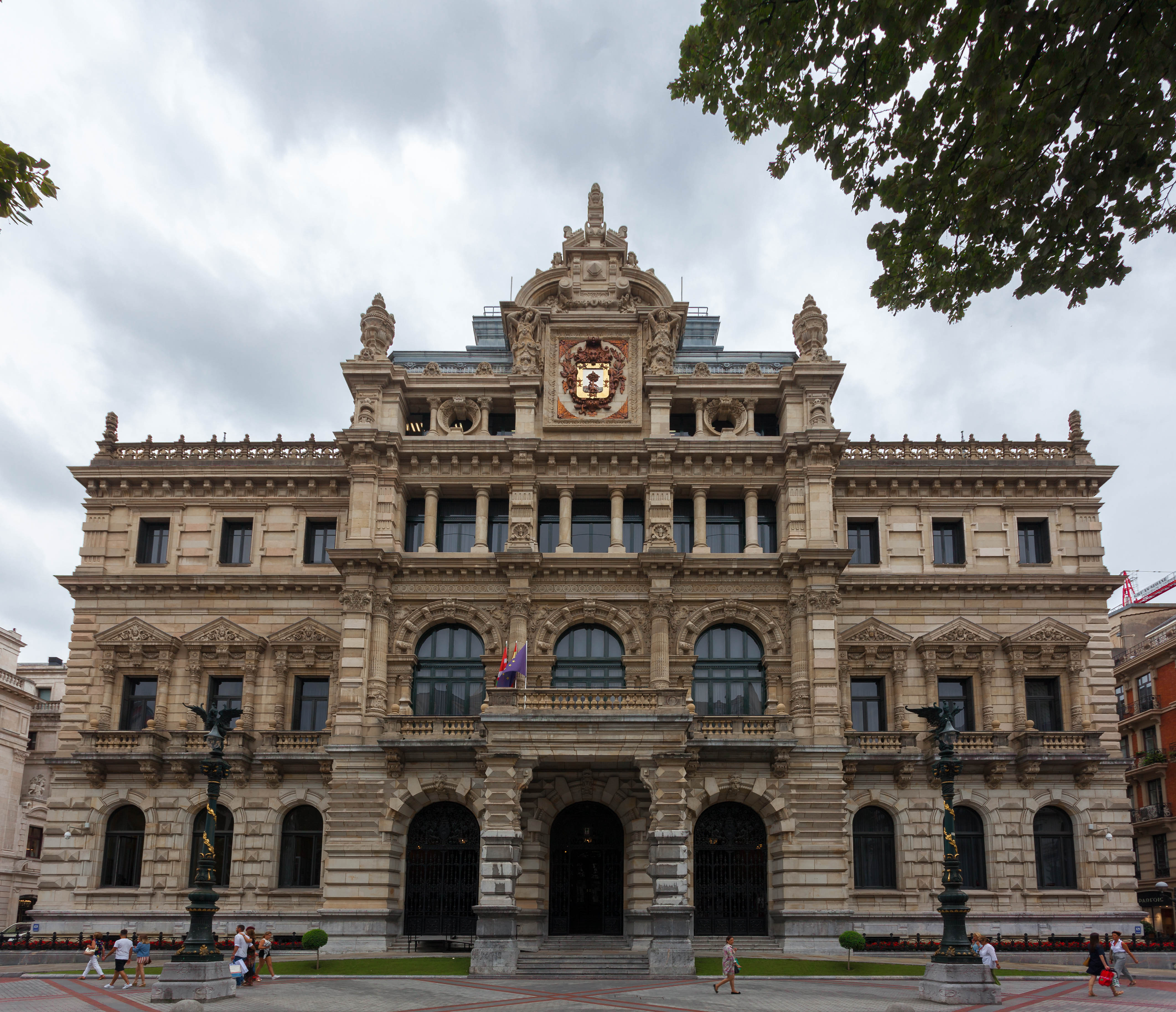
Palace of the Biscay Foral Council

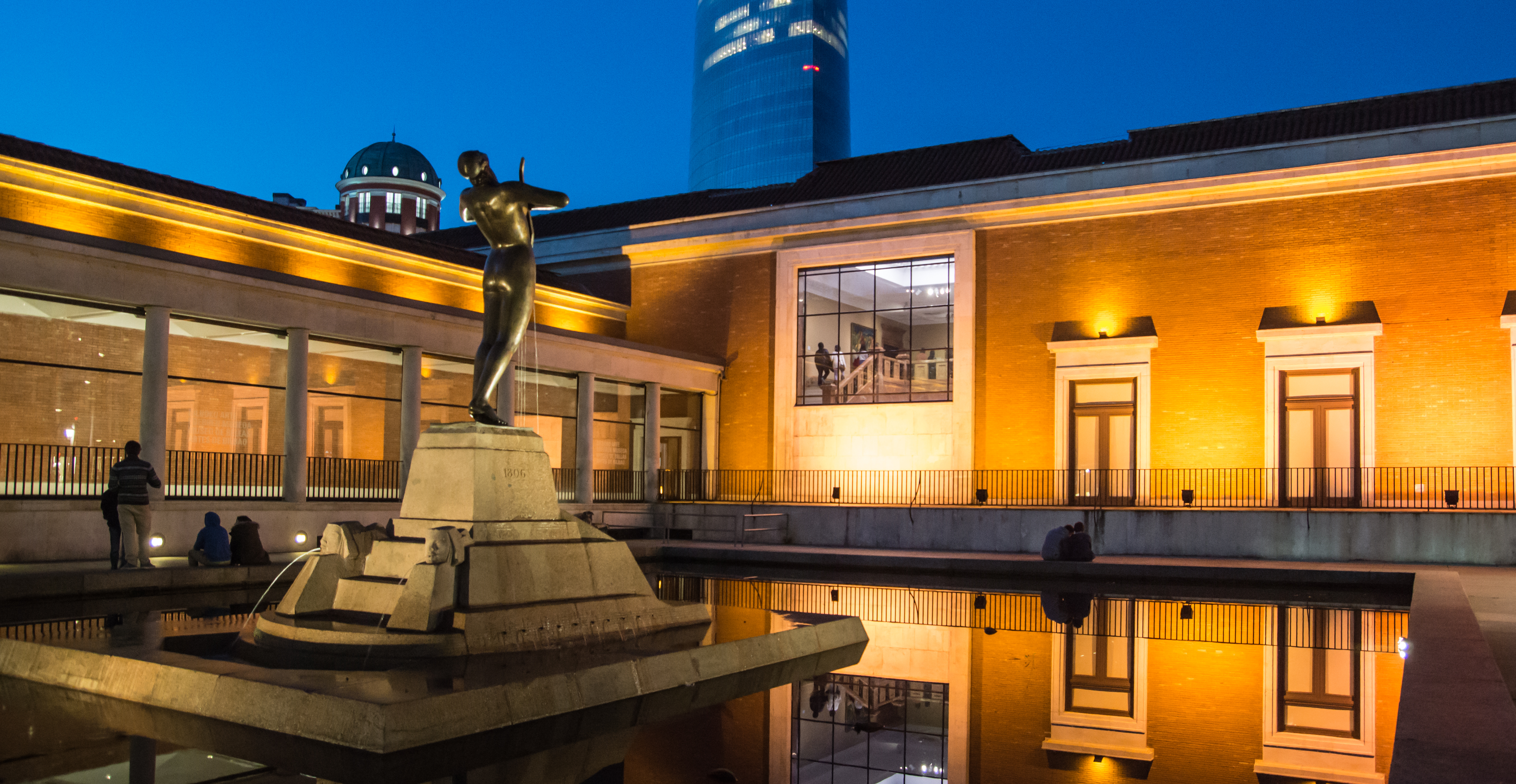
Bilbao Fine Arts Museum

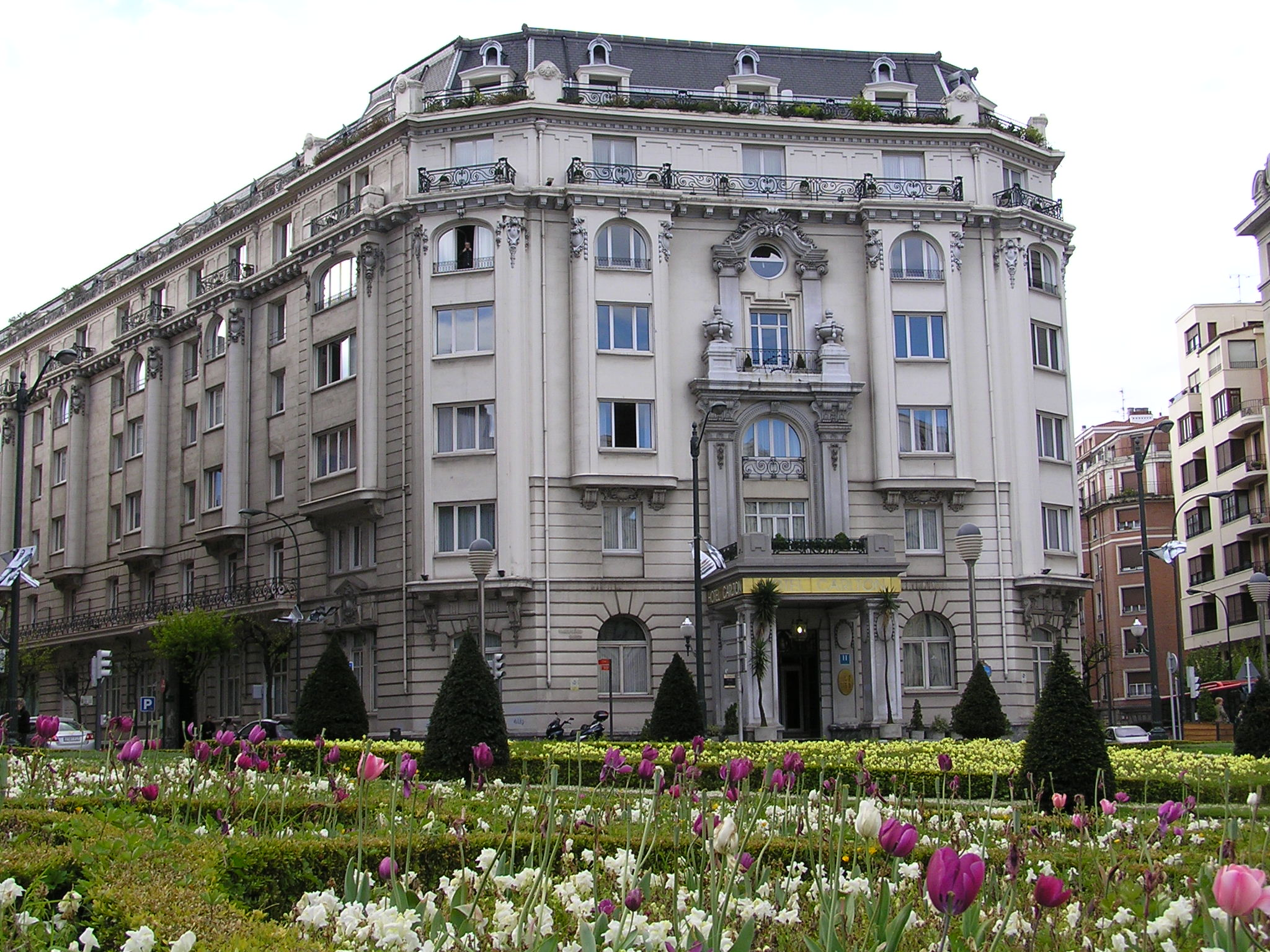
Carlton Hotel

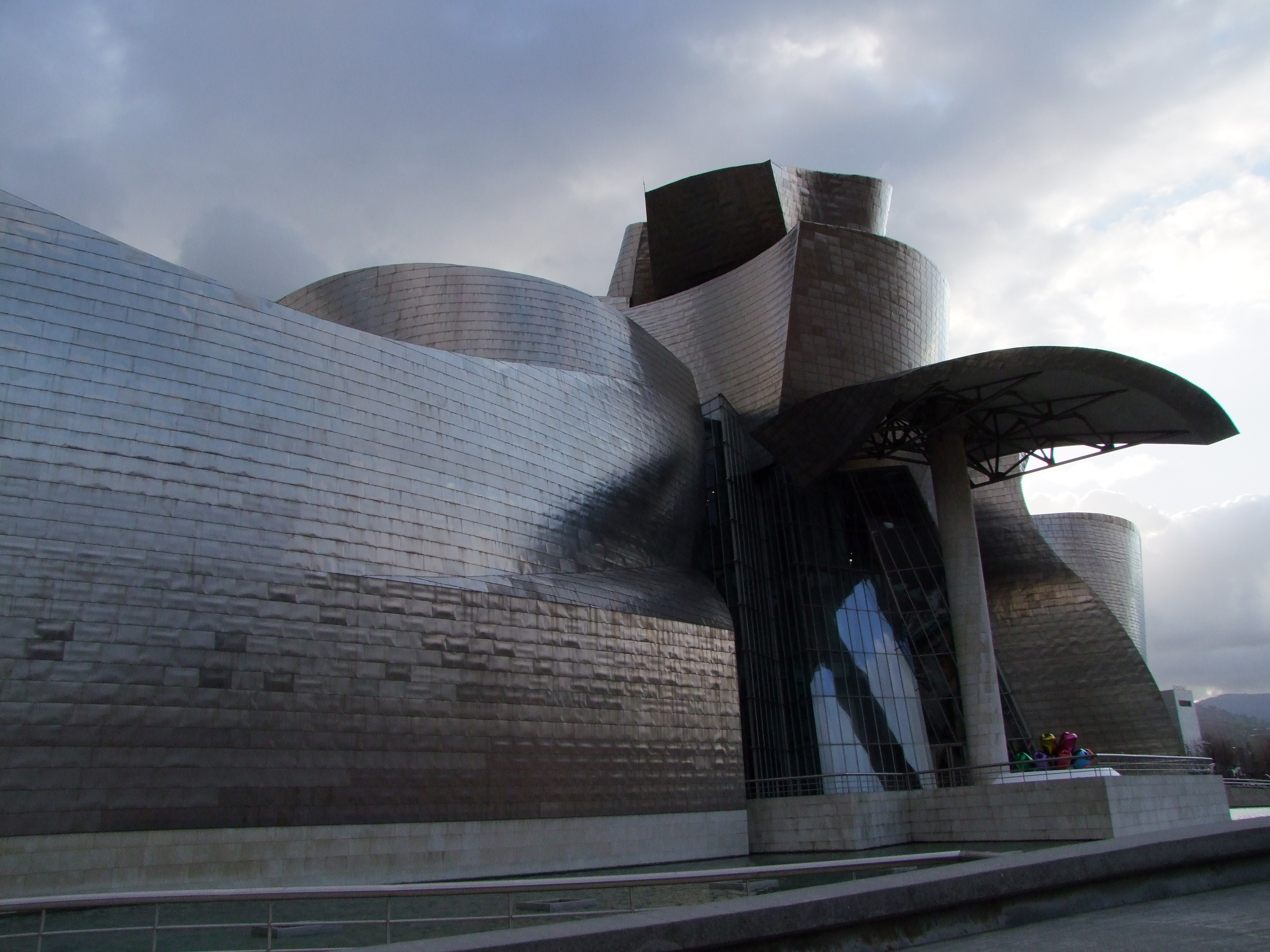
Guggenheim Museum Bilbao

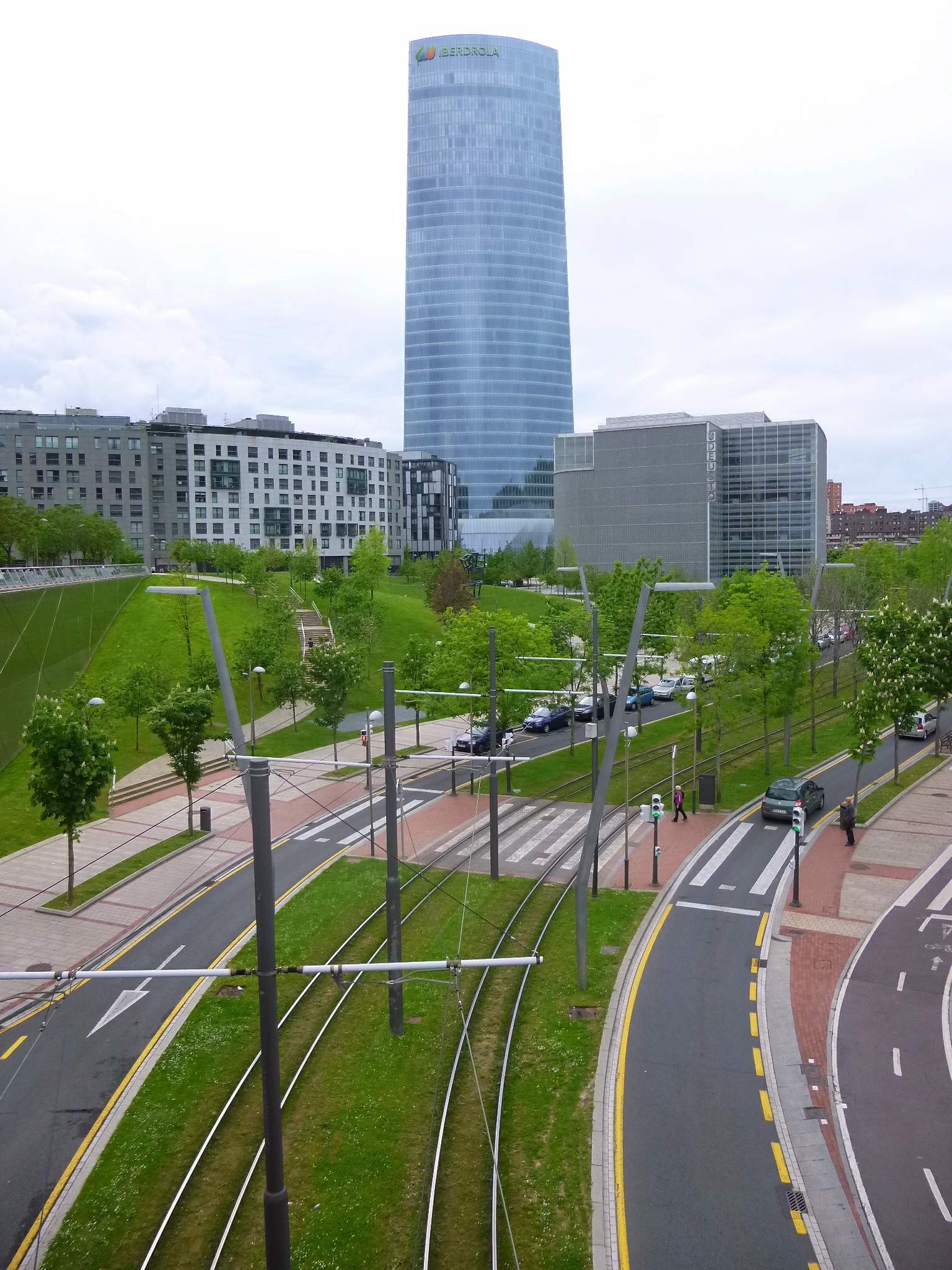
Abandoibarra Avenue

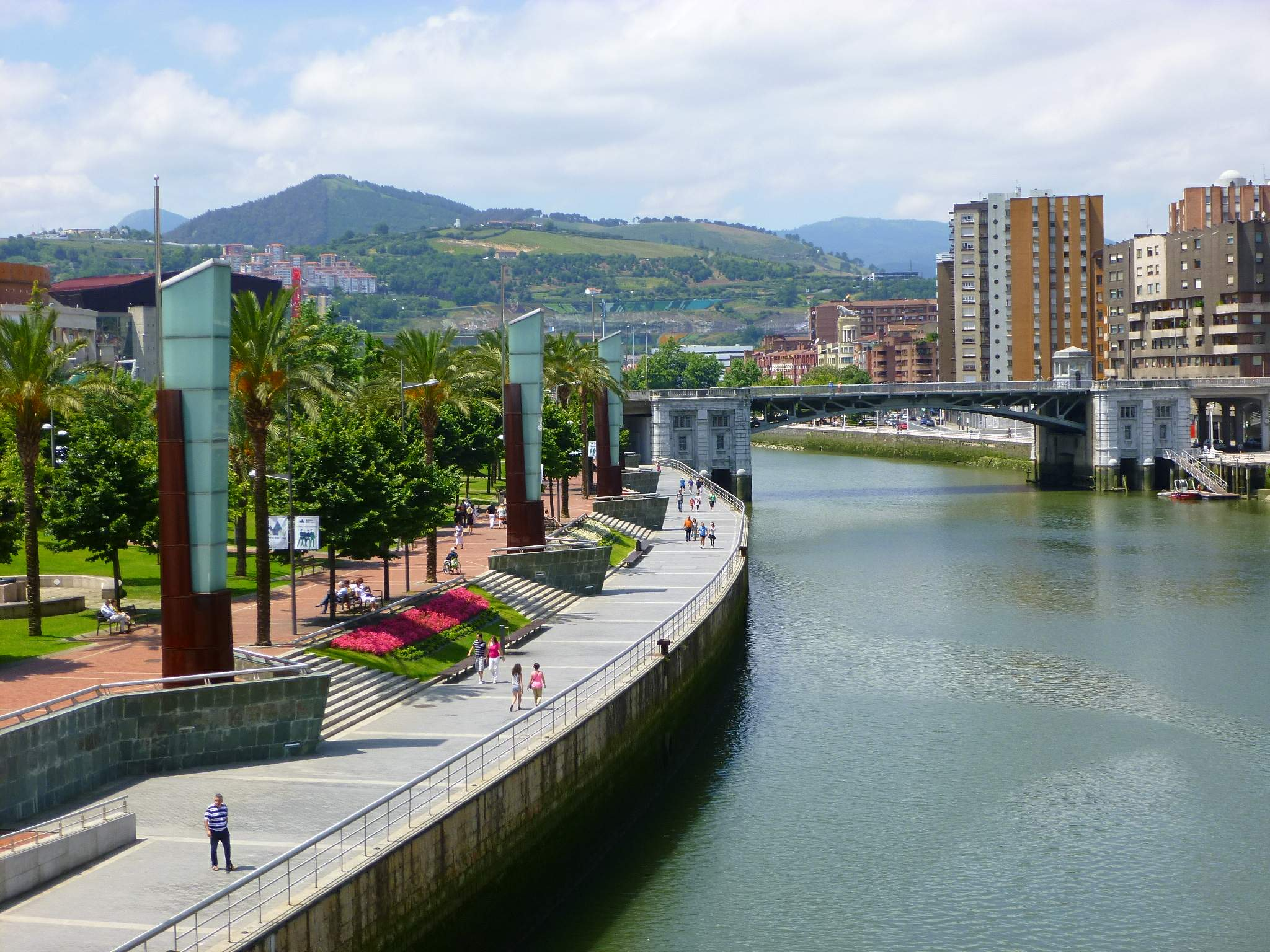
Evaristo Churruca docks

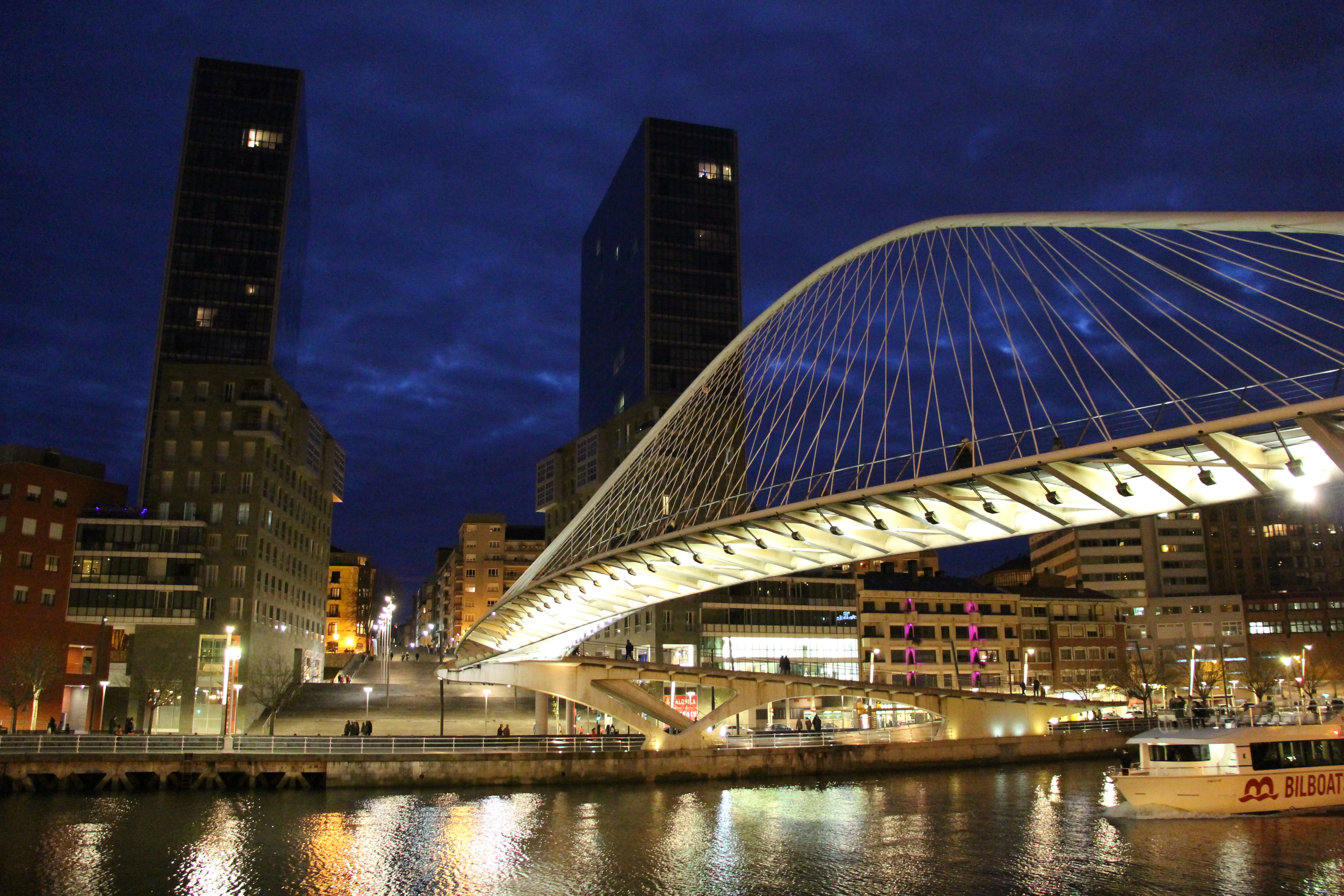
Zubizuri bridge and Isozaki Atea

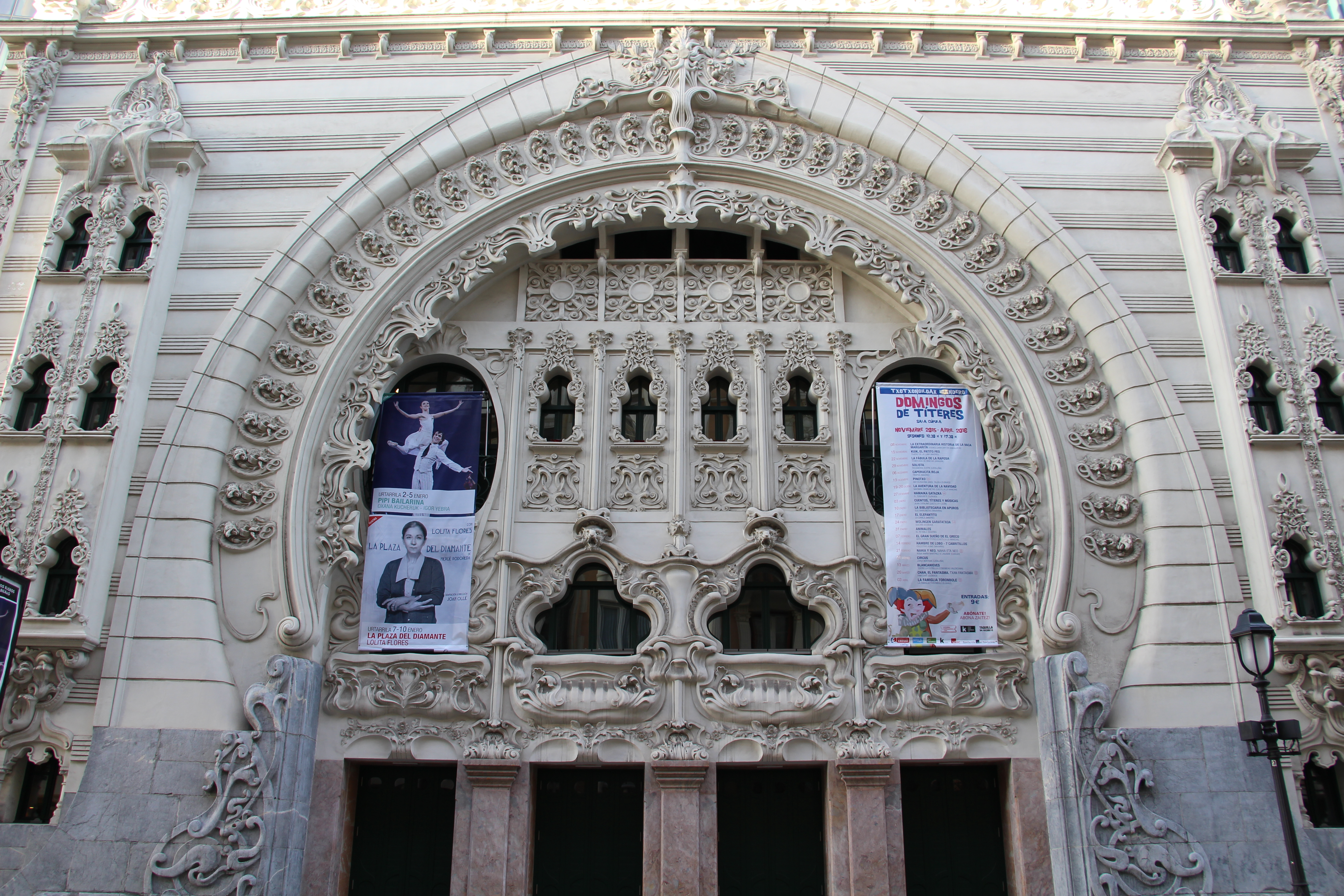
Campos Elíseos Theater

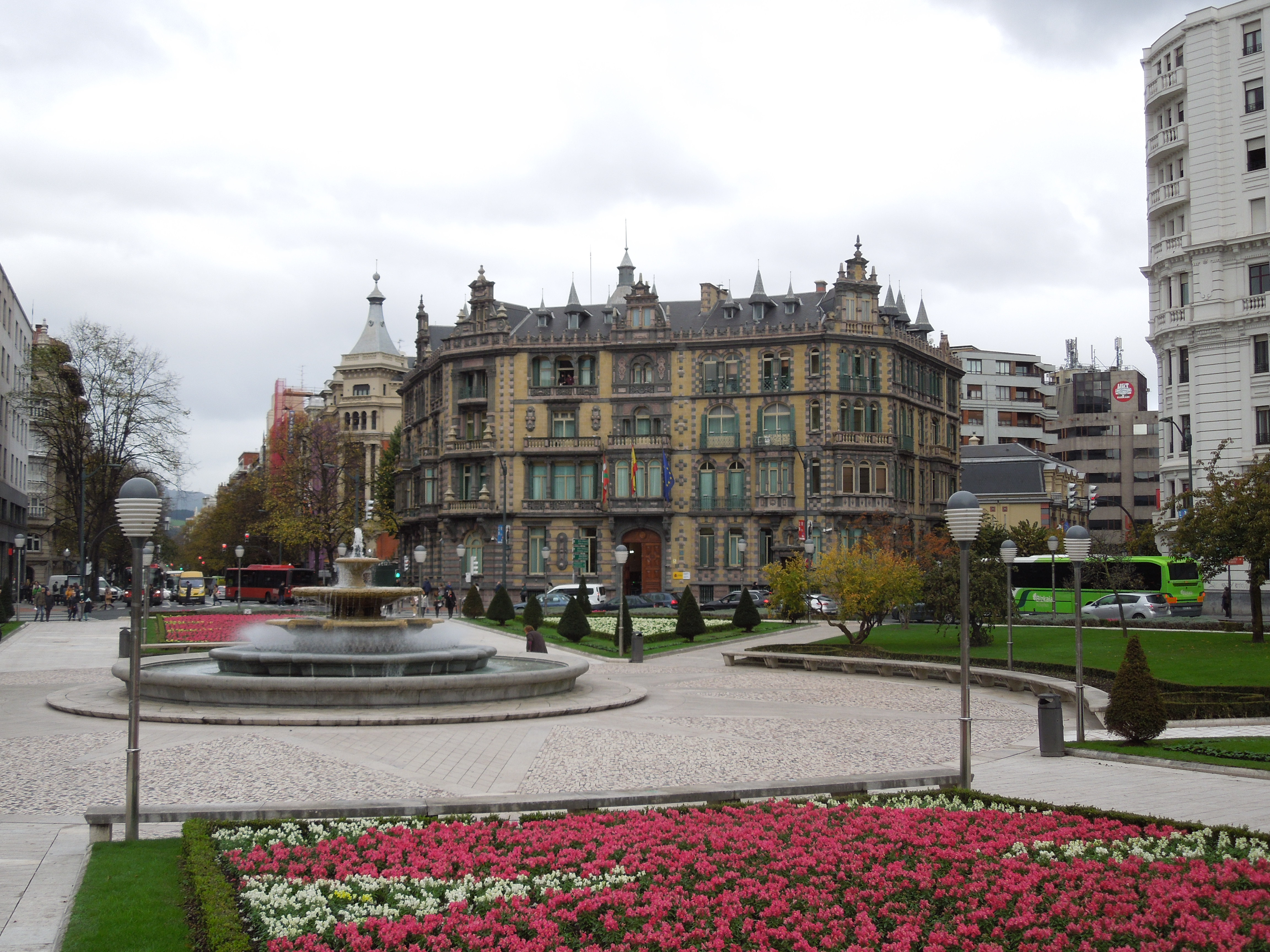
Plaza Elíptica
