= Indautxu (Bilbao Metro) =

Rapid transit station in Bilbao, Basque Country, Spain

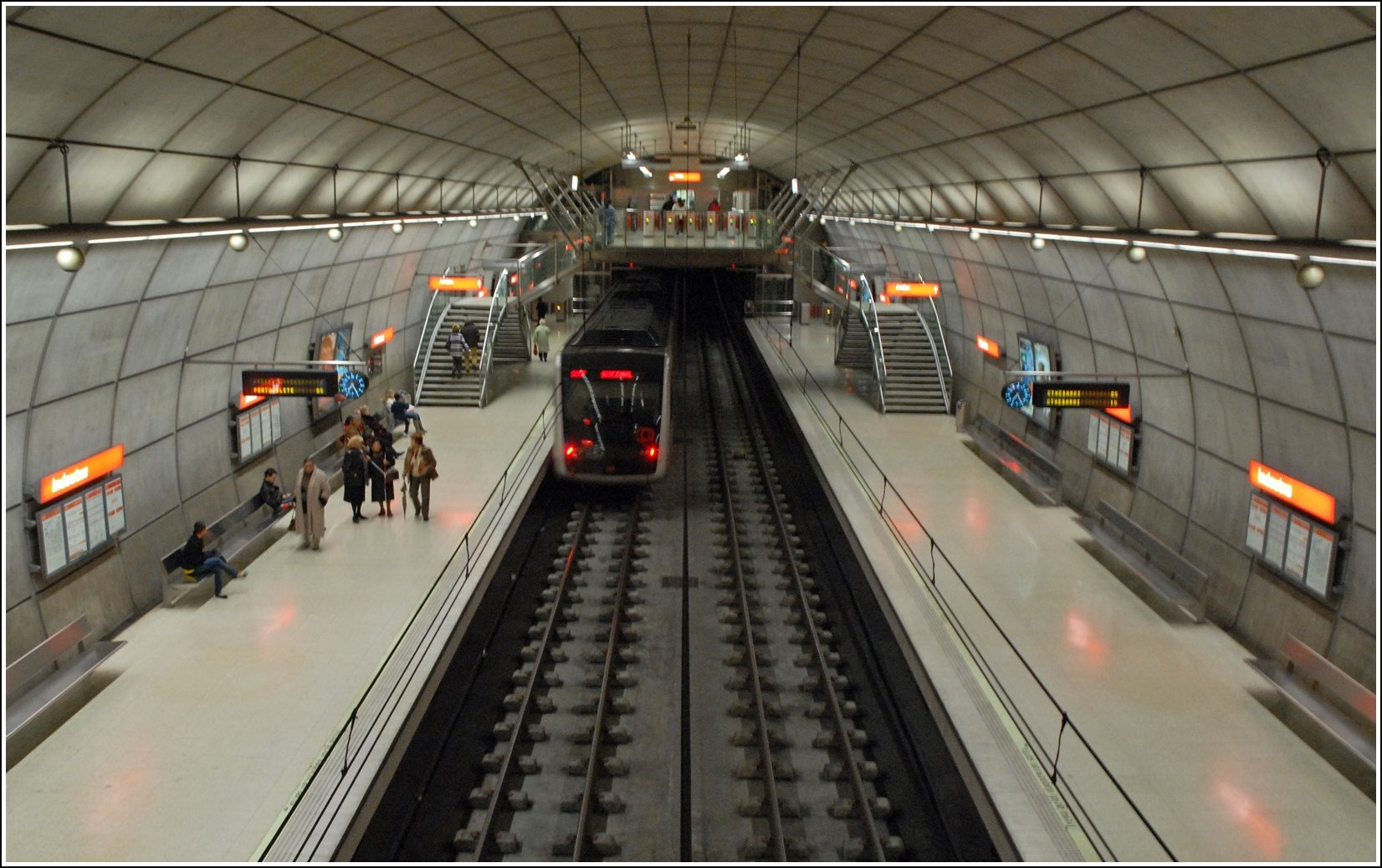
- View of the station from the mezzanine

General information
- Location: 62 Alameda de Urquijo; 48013 Bilbao; Spain
- Coordinates: 43°15′39″N 2°56′25″W
- Owner: Biscay Transport Consortium; Euskal Trenbide Sarea
- Lines: Line 1; Line 2
- Platforms: 2 side platforms
- Tracks: 2
- Connections: Bus

Construction
- Structure type: Underground
- Platform levels: 1
- Parking: No
- Accessible: Yes

Other information
- Fare zone: Zone 1

History
- Opened: 11 November 1995

Passengers
- 2021: 4,614,773

Services
Preceding station	Metro Bilbao	Following station
San Mamés towards Plentzia	Line 1	Eliptikoa towards Etxebarri
San Mamés towards Kabiezes	Line 2	Eliptikoa towards Basauri
Location

Indautxu is a station on Lines 1 and 2 of the Bilbao Metro. The station is located in the neighborhood of Indautxu, in the district of Abando. The station is located next to an underground shopping mall by the Indautxu Plaza. It opened on 11 November 1995.

== Station layout ==
Indautxu station follows the typical cavern-shaped layout of most underground Metro Bilbao stations designed by Norman Foster, with the main hall located directly above the rail tracks.

=== Access ===
- Indautxu Plaza (Urquijo exit, closed during the night time services)
- 33 Areilza St. (Areilza exit)
- 24 Areilza St. (Areilza exit)

== Services ==
The station is served by Line 1 from Etxebarri to Ibarbengoa and Plentzia, and by Line 2 from Basauri to Kabiezes.
