= Eliptikoa (Bilbao Metro) =

Rapid transit station in Bilbao, Basque Country, Spain

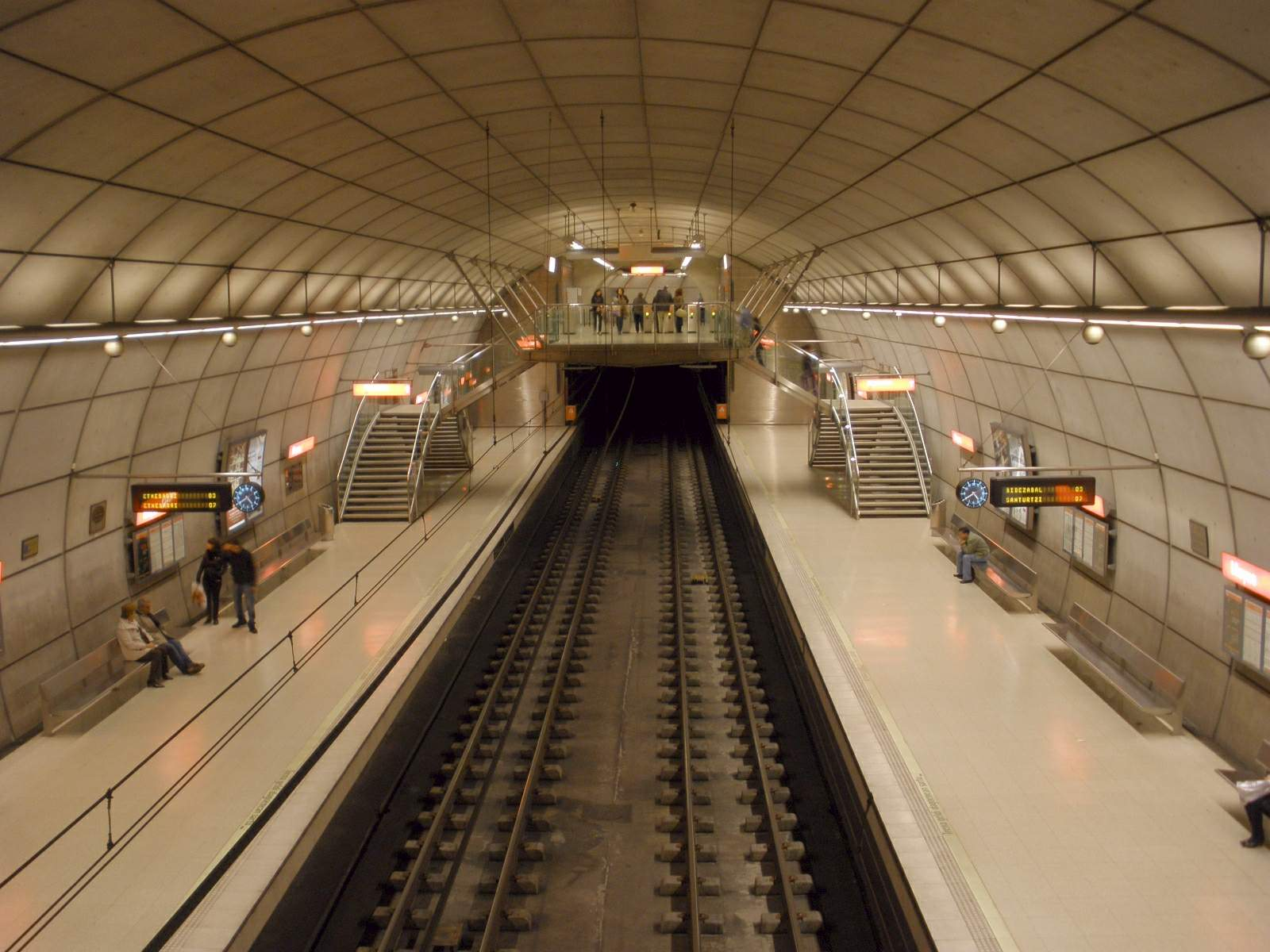
- View of the station from the mezzanine

General information
- Location: Plaza Elíptica; 48009 Bilbao; Spain
- Coordinates: 43°15′46″N 2°56′02″W
- Owner: Biscay Transport Consortium; Euskal Trenbide Sarea
- Lines: Line 1; Line 2
- Platforms: 2 side platforms
- Tracks: 2
- Connections: Bus

Construction
- Structure type: Underground
- Platform levels: 1
- Parking: No
- Accessible: Yes

Other information
- Fare zone: Zone 1

History
- Opened: 11 November 1995

Passengers
- 2025: 7,175,678

Services
Preceding station	Metro Bilbao	Following station
Indautxu towards Plentzia	Line 1	Abando towards Etxebarri
Indautxu towards Kabiezes	Line 2	Abando towards Basauri
Location

Eliptikoa, formerly called Moyua, is a station on Lines 1 and 2 of the Bilbao Metro. The station is located in the neighborhood of Abando, in the district with the same name. The station is located under the Plaza Elíptica. It opened on 11 November 1995.

In 2025, it was the third most used station of the network after Zazpikaleak/Casco Viejo and San Mamés, and is the closest station in distance to the Guggenheim Museum Bilbao.

== Station layout ==
Eliptikoa station follows the typical cavern-shaped layout of most underground Metro Bilbao stations designed by Norman Foster, with the main hall located directly above the rail tracks.

=== Access ===
- 3 Elíptica Plaza (Elcano exit)
- 1 Elíptica Plaza (Ercilla-Guggenheim exit)
- 8 Diputación street (Diputación exit, closed during night time services)
- 37 Gran Vía (Ercilla-Guggenheim exit)

== Services ==
The station is served by Line 1 from Etxebarri to Ibarbengoa and Plentzia, and by Line 2 from Basauri to Kabiezes. The station is also served by local Bilbobus and regional Bizkaibus bus services.

=== Future ===
In 2008, the Basque Government made public the project for line 4 of the metro, which was to connect Eliptikoa with the southern district of Errekalde, with the construction works expected to begin within the following two years. In 2009 the Basque Government announced the possibility of connecting the then under construction Line 3 with the future Line 4 at Matiko, thus extending the line 4 from Errekalde to Matiko via Eliptikoa and two additional stations, one by the Doña Casilda Iturrizar park and another one by the campus of the University of Deusto. This project would have involved constructing a second station hall at Eliptikoa for the new platforms and tracks.

The line, however, stayed as a mere project, and in 2017 the Basque Government announced that any type of construction work could not begin before 2020 due to the lack of resources, a problem that also affected the line 5 project to Galdakao.
