= Bilbao-Concordia railway station =

Railway station in Bilbao

Bilbao-Concordia
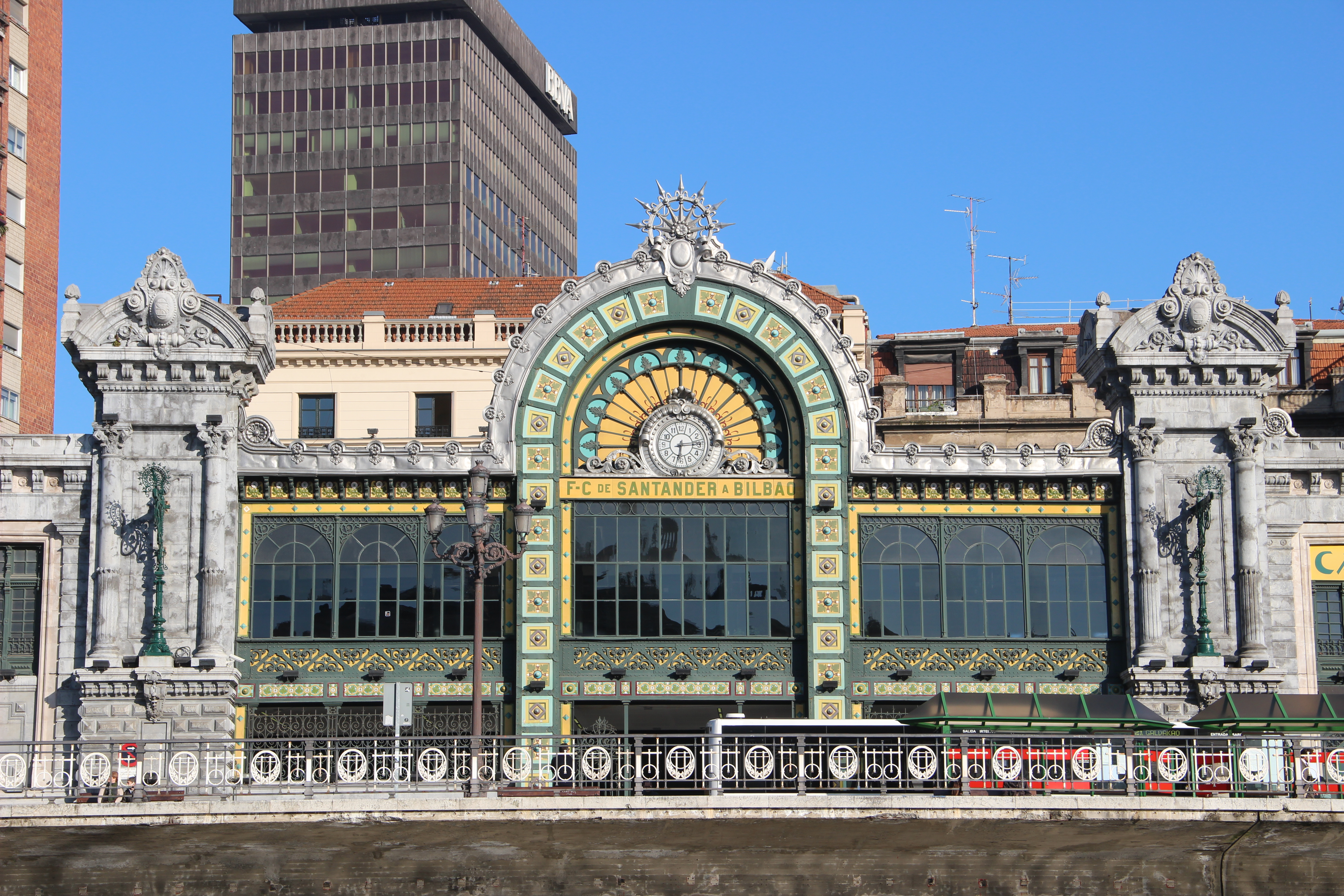
- Station's main hall from the exterior

General information
- Location: 2, Bailén street 48003 Bilbao; Spain
- Coordinates: 43°15′37″N 2°55′36″W
- System: Terminal station
- Owner: Adif
- Lines: Renfe regional services Bilbao commuter rail: C4 Bilbao-Balmaseda; R3b Bilbao-Karrantza
- Platforms: 2 side platforms
- Tracks: 3
- Connections: Bus

Construction
- Structure type: Elevated station
- Platform levels: 1
- Parking: No
- Accessible: yes

History
- Opened: 1902
- Rebuilt: 2007
Location

The Bilbao-Concordia railway station, also known as La Concordia Station, and formerly and colloquially known as Santander Station, is a terminal railway station in Bilbao, Basque Country (Spain). The station was opened in 1902 and currently serves as the terminus station for several narrow-gauge regional and metropolitan railway services operated by Renfe. The Bilbao-Abando railway station, also operated by Renfe and that offers medium and long-distance services is located in close proximity.

It is a distinctive building in the modernist style, and is regarded as an important example of Belle Époque architecture in Bilbao.

== History ==
During the 19th century several narrow-gauge railways were opened across northern Spain as a viable solution to the region's difficult topography and unlike other southern regions, where Iberian-gauge was predominant. The station was opened in 1898 as the terminus for the Bilbao-Santander railway and finished in 1902. The station was placed at the fringe of the then developing ensanche of the city, bordered by the Bilbao river.

The station was promoted by the engineer Valentín Gorbeña, who was also behind the construction of the Cadagua railway, and designed by the architect Severino Achúcarro, who had already aided with the urban plan for the ensanche in 1876. The station acted as the Biscayan head for the Company of the Bilbao-Santander Railway, a railway company established by the merge of three former railway lines. At the time of its opening, it was conceived to be a mixed-used passenger and freight railway station. In 1965 the company was nationalised and transformed into FEVE, after which the station building moved to public hands.

In the year 2007 it was completely renovated with the goal of adapting it to the modern requirements of a railway terminal, improving its accessibility.

After the construction of the high speed line Basque Y is finished, the neighbouring Bilbao-Abando station will be renovated to accommodate all railway services starting in Abando, which will include the narrow-gauge services currently starting at this station. Bilbao-Concordia will expectedly cease to serve as a railway station after then, and its future use is still undefined.

=== Name ===
The station's name has traditionally been La Concordia (Spanish for The Concord), and it has its origins in the grounds where the station would be finally constructed. In the year 1857 the opening of the Bilbao-Tudela railway in the nearby Bilbao-Abando railway station involved a great volume of capital coming from local Bilbao families. When the railway company became close to bankruptcy a years later, a meeting between investors took place in a railway pavilion located in close proximity to Bilbao-Abando. Due to the positive outcome of the meeting, the pavilion became known as La Concordia, and the station inherited the name.

== Station layout ==
The station is distributed along two stories, the ground floor containing the main hall, cafeteria, ticket vending machines, as well as the railway offices. The main entrance of the building looks towards Bailén street and the Bilbao river, whereas a rear entrance connects with Bilbao-Abando railway station via José María Olavarri street. The second floor contains two parallel platforms and the railway tracks.

=== Access ===
- 3, Bailén Street
- José María Olavarri street

== Services ==
=== Regional services ===
Since its opening the station has been the terminus of the lines belonging to the former Bilbao-Santander railway, which connects the city of Bilbao with others in Biscay and northern Spain, such as Santander and León.

	Renfe	
Ametzola toward Santander	Line R-3	Terminus
Ametzola toward Leon	Line R-4	Terminus

=== Local services ===
Bilbao-Concordia also serves as terminus station for two narrow-gauge commuter railway lines connecting Bilbao with the Enkarterri region of Biscay, reaching Balmaseda and Karrantza after traversing the Kadagua valley.

	Cercanías Bilbao	
Ametzola toward Balmaseda	Line C4	Terminus
Ametzola toward Karrantza	Line R3b	Terminus

== Other services ==
Bilbao-Concordia is located in close proximity of the main Bilbao-Abando railway station, which is part of the Renfe network with local services and long-distance trains to Madrid and Barcelona, as well as a metro station. Bilbao-Concordia is connected directly to Bilbao-Abando by a pedestrian access. The Zazpikaleak/Casco Viejo station is located at around 500 metres from Bilbao-Concordia. This station is operated by Euskotren Trena and from there trains run to Durango, Elgoibar and San Sebastián.

The Abando stop of the Bilbao tram, operated by Euskotren Tranbia is located on Navarra street at about 300 metres from the Bilbao-Abando station. The tram connects the district of Abando with Ibaiondo and Basurto-Zorroza.

=== Bus services ===
The station is served by the following regional Bizkaibus services, running to other municipalities within the Bilbao metropolitan area or elsewhere in Biscay.

- A3613 Bilbao - Ugao/Miraballes - Goikiri
- A3622 Bilbao - Basauri - Artunduaga - Zaratamo
- A3631 Bilbao - Galdakao - Larrabetzu
- A3632 Bilbao - Basauri - Begoña
