= Gran Vía de Don Diego López de Haro =

Coordinates: 43.2634°N 2.9369°W

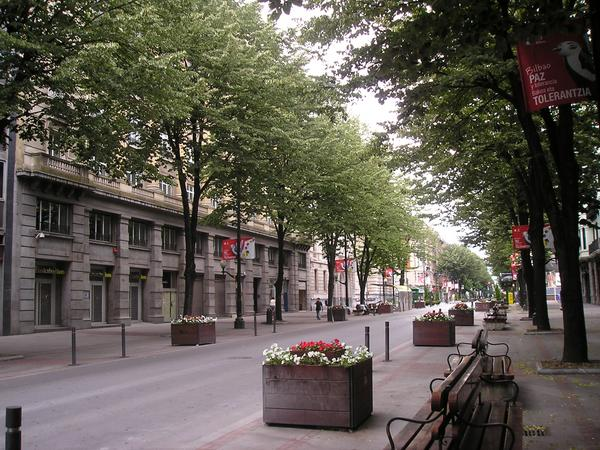
Gran Vía between Circular square and Elíptica square.

The Gran Vía de Don Diego López de Haro is the main avenue of the city of Bilbao, Basque Country (Spain).

== History ==
It's named after the founder of the city, Diego López de Haro V, lord of Biscay. It was conceived in 1876, when the extension (ensanche) of Bilbao was planned by architects Alzola, Achúcarro and Hoffmeyer in the wide plains of the former municipality of Abando.

== Features ==
The avenue is 50 meters wide and 1.5 km (one mile) long. It starts at the Circular square, beside the BBVA building, and ends at the Sacred Heart square. The main Elíptica square is in the middle of the avenue, about 500 m from its beginning and 800 m from its end. The statue of the Sacred Heart is aligned with the spire of the Basilica of Begoña, about 3 km away, through the Gran Vía, forming a monumental perspective in a way similar to Paris' Axe historique.

== Economy ==
The avenue is the most important shopping and business area of Bilbao, BBK and BBVA banks have their headoffices in it, and El Corte Inglés department store has two buildings in it. It has some of Spain's most expensive real estate prices.
