= Plaza Elíptica =

Coordinates: 43.263°N 2.935°W

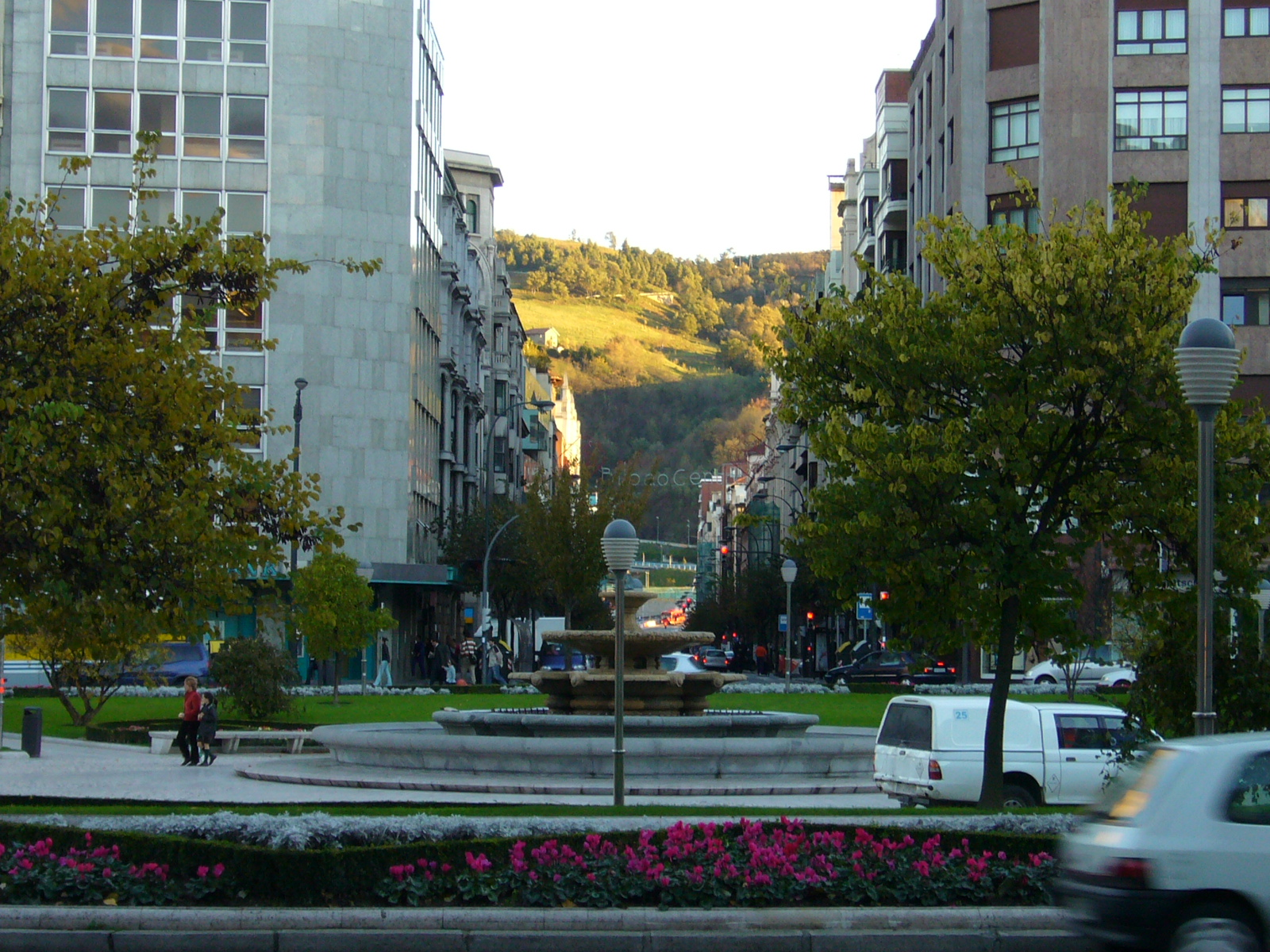
View of Plaza Elíptica from the south, Alameda Rekalde street.

Plaza Elíptica (Basque: Plaza Eliptikoa), formerly named Moyúa, is a public square located in the center of Bilbao's extension, in the district of Abando. The square was conceived in 1876 as a central hub in the middle of Gran Vía de Don Diego López de Haro avenue, from where the main eight streets depart in radius-like shape and was merely called Plaza Elíptica (Elliptic Square) because of its form. The square was refurbished in the 1940s to adopt its current form, with a central fountain and several gardens in French and English styles, and was renamed to honour a former mayor of the city, Federico Moyúa.

The square as is today was totally rebuilt in 1997 after six years of works to build the Bilbao Metro. Eliptikoa metro station is the closest to the famous Guggenheim Museum. Trains on both lines 1 and 2 call at the station, sharing the same tracks and platforms. It is also the terminus for Bilbobus routes 1 and 76.

== See also ==
- Eliptikoa (Bilbao Metro)
- Bilbao Metro
