= Euskalduna Conference Centre and Concert Hall =

Building in Bilbao, Spain

Euskalduna Palace
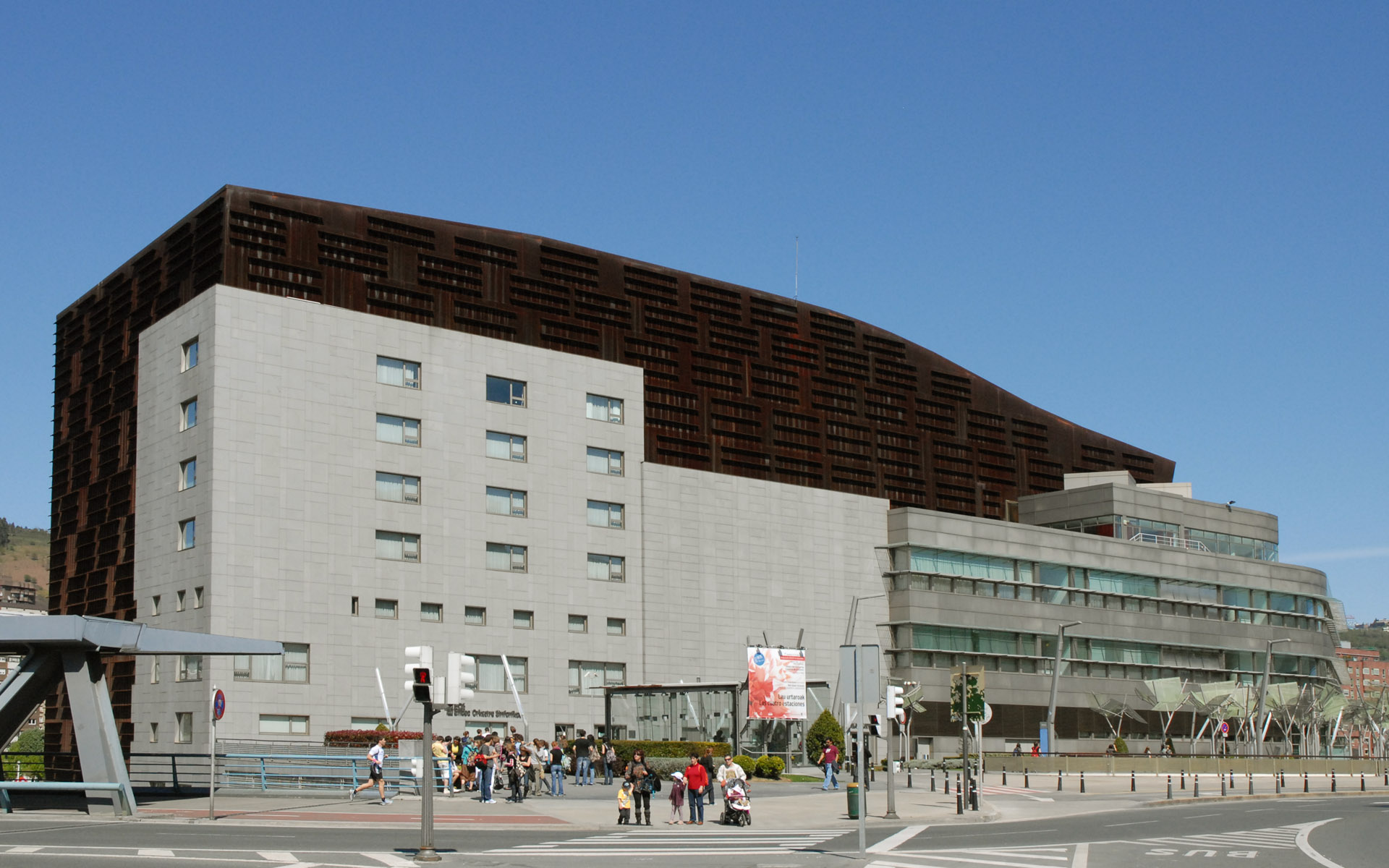
- Euskalduna Conference Centre overview
- Interactive map of Euskalduna Palace
- Address: 4, Abandoibarra Avenue
- Location: Abando, Bilbao, Spain
- Coordinates: 43.267°N 2.945°W
- Capacity: 2,164
- Type: Concert hall, Theatre, Conference Centre

Construction
- Built: 1994-1999
- Opened: February 19, 1999

Website
- Official Website

The Euskalduna Conference Centre and Concert Hall or Euskalduna Palace or Euskalduna Hall (Palacio Euskalduna in Spanish, Euskalduna Jauregia in Basque) is located in the city of Bilbao, Basque Country (Spain), beside the Estuary of Bilbao, built in part of the area that was formerly occupied by the Euskalduna shipyards.

The building includes both a Concert Hall and an Opera House (auditorium) and a Conference Centre (facilities for conferences).

== History ==
It was designed by architects Federico Soriano and Dolores Palacios and construction started in 1994. It was inaugurated in February 1999 and contains a variety of spaces, functioning as a conference center, opera house and concert hall. In 2003 it was declared by the International Congress Palace Association as the world's best congress centre. The building also won the Enric Miralles award. Euskalduna organizes and hosts a wide range of activities, including cultural, political, business, academic and social events. The main auditorium in the building has 2,164 seats and can stage performances of theatre, ballet, concerts, and opera. The building is equipped with storage space, dressing rooms, and rehearsal rooms.

It is located on the zone of Abandoibarra, near the Guggenheim Museum Bilbao. The building is connected to the rest of the city by tram, Bilbao Metro Lines 1 and 2 and Cercanías Bilbao Lines C1 and C2. It is located in the centre of the city and activities like BAO are well-regarded. The ABAO opera season is a major event in this building. It also houses the Bilbao Symphony Orchestra (BOS), founded in 1920.

== The building ==
- Auditorium, with 2,164 seats, it is used for multi-genre concerts, opera productions by the ABAO (Asociación Bilbaína de Amigos de la Ópera / The Bilbao Association of Friends of Opera) and the Bilbao Symphony Orchestra. It has the largest stage of any theatre in Europe with 1,770 sq. metres.
- Theatre with 614 seats. Is the most important place and is destined to several meetings and events. It has direct access to the Exhibition Hall and has excellent acoustics. Due to this excellent acoustic, this room can hosts different performances and musical events.
- Four Conference Rooms with two seating 230 and 270 and two seating 103 and 130
- Eight other meeting rooms
- A Press Room
- Restaurants: Euskalduna centre has two restaurants. One of them, Etxanobe, is a Michelin-starred restaurant.
- An Exhibition Hall: This space has 4,200 m^{2}. This space is usually divided in two halls with spaces that are destined to events, exhibitions, concerts, or urban fairs. The open space provides more facilities to organize different events.
- A commercial gallery.

== Awards and honours ==
In 2003, the Euskalduna Conference Centre won the Apex Award for the "World's Best Congress Centre in 2003", presented by the AIPC (International Association of Convention Centres).

== See also ==
- List of concert halls
- List of opera houses
