= Euskalduna =

Euskalduna de Construcción y Reparación de Buques de Bilbao
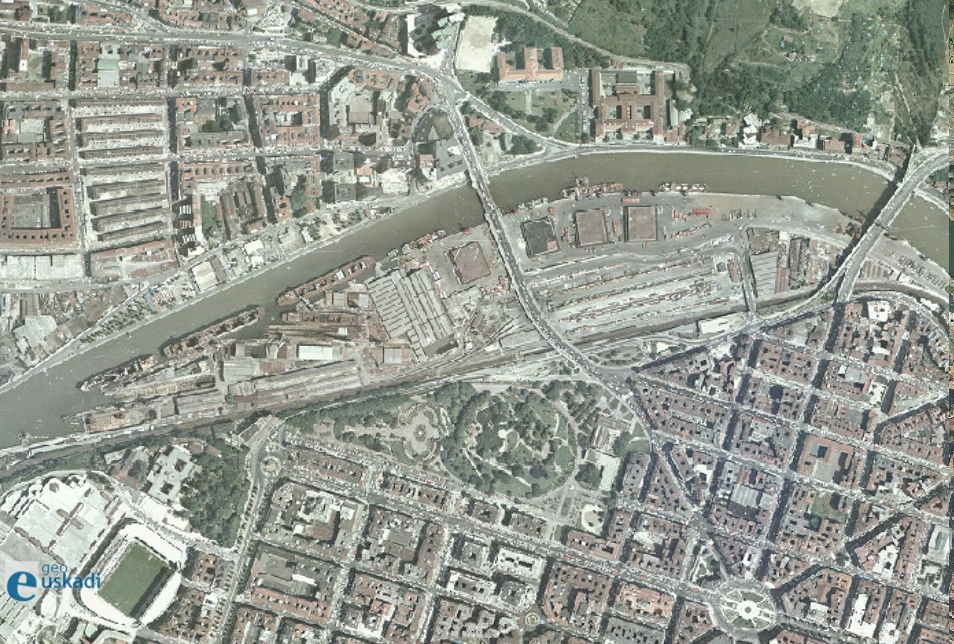
- Industry: Engineering
- Founded: 1900
- Defunct: 1984
- Headquarters: Bilbao, Spain
- Services: Ship building and repair Metal casting and forging Railway rolling stock, other vehicles

Euskalduna de Construcción y Reparación de Buques de Bilbao (shortened to Euskalduna) was a Basque engineering company specialising in ship construction, firearms, locomotives, and automobiles. The company was based in Bilbao, Spain and operated from 1900 until closure in 1984.

The site of the yard is now used for the Euskalduna Conference Centre and Concert Hall, as well as the Ria de Bilbao Maritime Museum (Bilbao Maritime Museum).

== History ==
The company was founded in 1900, promoted by shipping merchants Ramón de la Sota y Llano and Eduardo Aznar y de la Sota. 10,000 shares were issued to a value of 4 million pesetas; the new company took over the facilities of the Sociedad de los Diques Secos de Bilbao (Dry Dock company of Bilbao) through the offer of 2,000 shares plus two permanent seats on the Board of Directors. The company expanded through acquisition up to World War I acquiring Talleres de Troca (Workshops of Troca), a forging and casting company. In 1914 the company employed 950 people.

In the 1860s, a number of Chassepot barrels were cast by Euskalduna's Palencia foundries under contract from the French Government, marked "Euscalduna Palencia". Some of these Palencia Chassepots, supplied to the early Japanese military, were remodeled into Murata rifles in the early 1880s. Hiram Maxim described the quality of firearms manufactured by the Palencia arms factory as extremely poor, mostly being counterfeit Winchester rifles using components rejected by other European arsenals' quality control. These Palencia Winchesters were apparently sold primarily to Africans.

World War I brought increased demand; the company was able to expand during the period, and eventually had facilities for ships of 12,000 tonnes. Post war demand fell despite increasing protectionism; the company diversified into manufacture of rolling stock - including wagons, steam locomotives, and trams), the company also began to manufacture rolling mill equipment, as well as road vehicles such as buses. By 1920 the company employed over 3700 people.

Employment numbers had dropped to around 1500 by 1935; during the Spanish Civil War the factories output was militarised, afterwards the company received state backing. in 1956 it acquired SA Juliana Constructora Gijonesa, in 1967 it formed part of the conglomerate Astilleros Españoles SA (Spanish Shipyards), merging with La Naval which had itself taken over the Astilleros Celaya in 1965. Euskalduna contributed 50% of the capital of the new enterprise. The new company was the largest merchant shipping construction company in Spain, and one of the largest in Europe.

As a negative result of the effects of the 1973 oil crisis the company began to record losses, the company also faced increased competition from East Asia (South Korea and Japan), as well as the reduction or loss of state aid due to entry to the EU in 1986; state restructuring resulted in the closure of the yard in 1987, to much opposition, and with 1,297 job losses as a result.

== Post closure ==
The Bilbao Maritime Museum is located on part of the site of the shipyard, the Euskalduna Conference Centre and Concert Hall is also situated on part of the site.

== See also ==
- Ugartechea
