= Errekalde =

Coordinates: 43°15′07″N 2°56′46″W

- District
- Errekalde district is highlighted in blue in this map of the districts of Bilbao.
- Interactive map of Errekalde
- Country: Spain
- Autonomous community: Basque Country
- Province: Biscay
- Comarca: Greater Bilbao
- Municipality: Bilbao

Area
  - Total: 6.96 km^{2} (2.69 sq mi)

Population (2016)
  - Total: 47,245
  - Density: 6,790/km^{2} (17,600/sq mi)

Recalde (or Errekalde) is the seventh district of the city of Bilbao (Biscay), in the Spanish Basque Country. It is divided into the following neighborhoods: Amezola, Iralabarri, Iturrigorri-Peñascal, Rekaldeberri-Larraskitu and Uretamendi.

The meaning of Errekalde in Basque is 'near the creek' (erreka 'creek' and alde 'near').

In 2016 the district's population was 47,245 in an area of 6.96 square kilometers.

== Sights ==
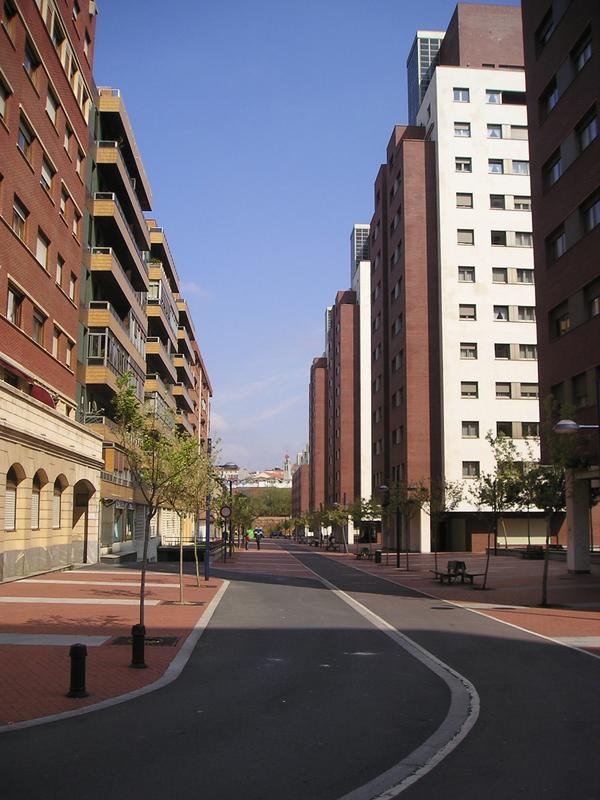
The new residential developments of Ametzola.
