= Zurbaranbarri station =

Railway station in Bilbao, Basque Country, Spain

Zurbaranbarri
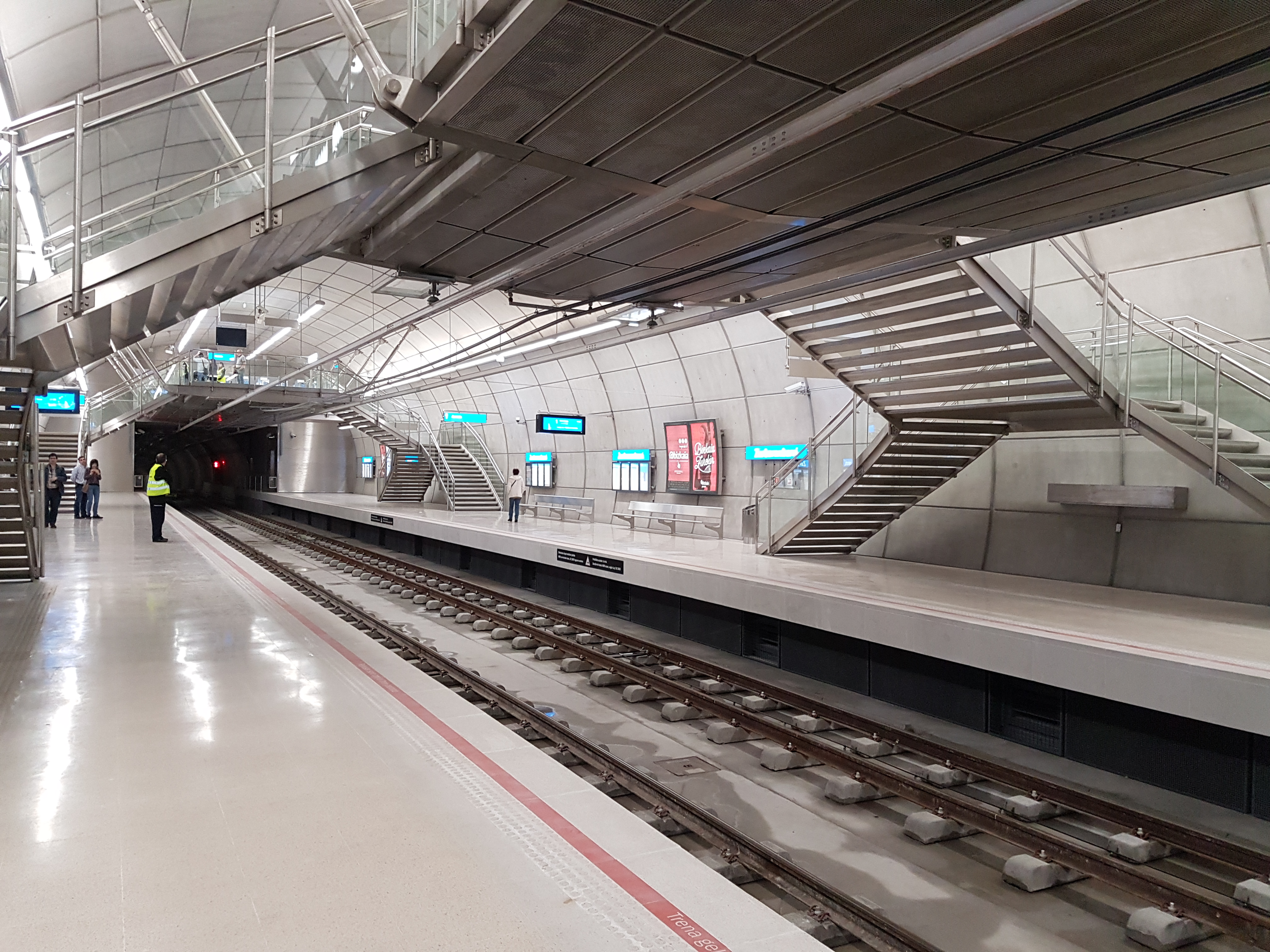
- View of the platforms and tracks

General information
- Location: 49-57, Barrio Zurbaranbarri; 48007 Bilbao; Spain
- Coordinates: 43°15′50″N 2°54′49″W
- Owner: Euskal Trenbide Sarea
- Lines: Line 3; Line E1; Line E3; Line E4
- Platforms: 2 side platforms
- Tracks: 2
- Connections: Bus

Construction
- Structure type: Underground
- Platform levels: 1
- Parking: No
- Accessible: Yes

Other information
- Fare zone: Zone 1

History
- Opened: 8 April 2017
Location

Zurbaranbarri is a station on Line 3 of the Bilbao Metro and Euskotren Trena commuter and regional rail services. The station is located in the neighborhood of Zurbaran, part of the Uribarri district of Bilbao. It opened on 8 April 2017.

== Station layout ==
Zurbaranbarri follows the same cavern-like station layout shared by most underground stations of the system, designed by Norman Foster, with the main hall located suspended directly above the tracks.

=== Access ===
- Vía Vieja de Lezama (Vía Vieja de Lezama exit)
- 35 Zumaia St. (Zumaia exit, closed during night time services)
- 62, Barrio Zurbaranbarri (Vía Vieja de Lezama exit)

== Services ==
Unlike the two other lines of the Bilbao Metro system (which are operated by Metro Bilbao, S.A.), Line 3 is operated by Euskotren, which runs it as part of the Euskotren Trena network. Trains from the Bilbao–San Sebastián, Txorierri and Urdaibai lines of the network run through Line 3. The station is also served by local Bilbobus lines.

Preceding station	Euskotren Trena	Following station
Zazpikaleak/Casco Viejo towards Matiko	Line 3	Txurdinaga towards Kukullaga
Zazpikaleak/Casco Viejo towards Matiko	Line E1	Txurdinaga towards Pasaia
Zazpikaleak/Casco Viejo towards Lezama	Line E3	Txurdinaga towards Kukullaga
Zazpikaleak/Casco Viejo towards Matiko	Line E4	Txurdinaga towards Bermeo

== Gallery ==
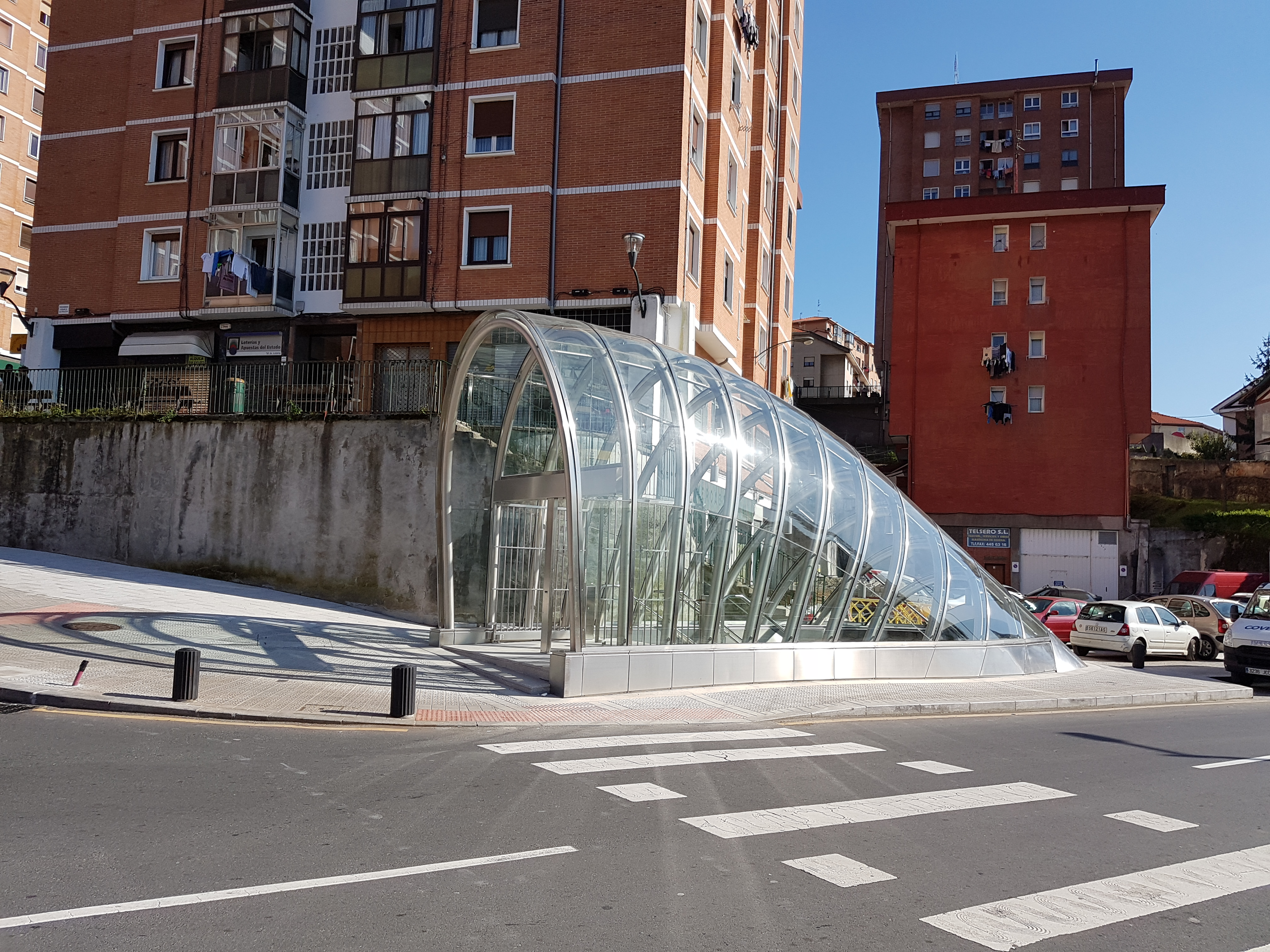
Fosterito, the station entrance

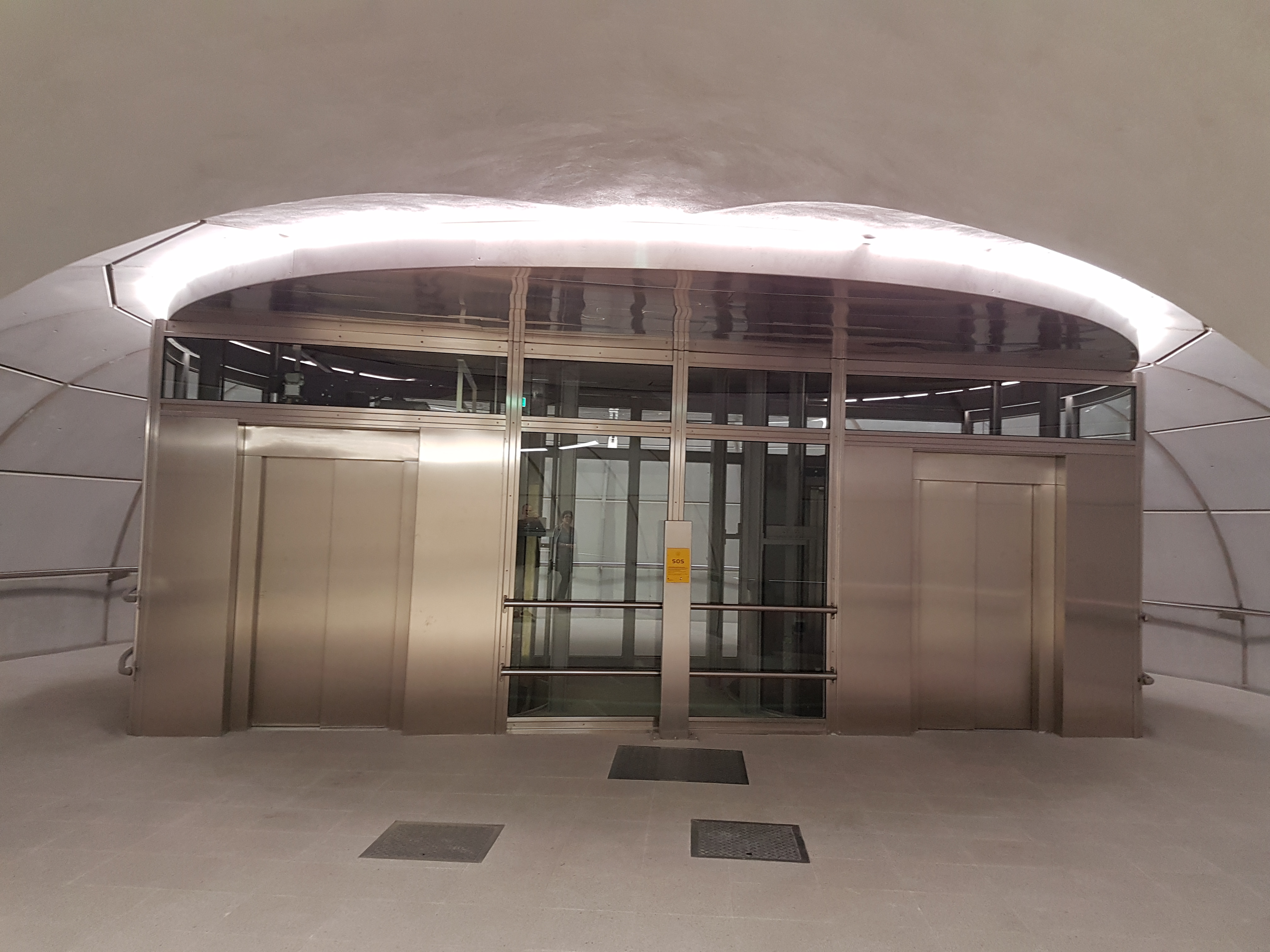
Elevators for disabled access

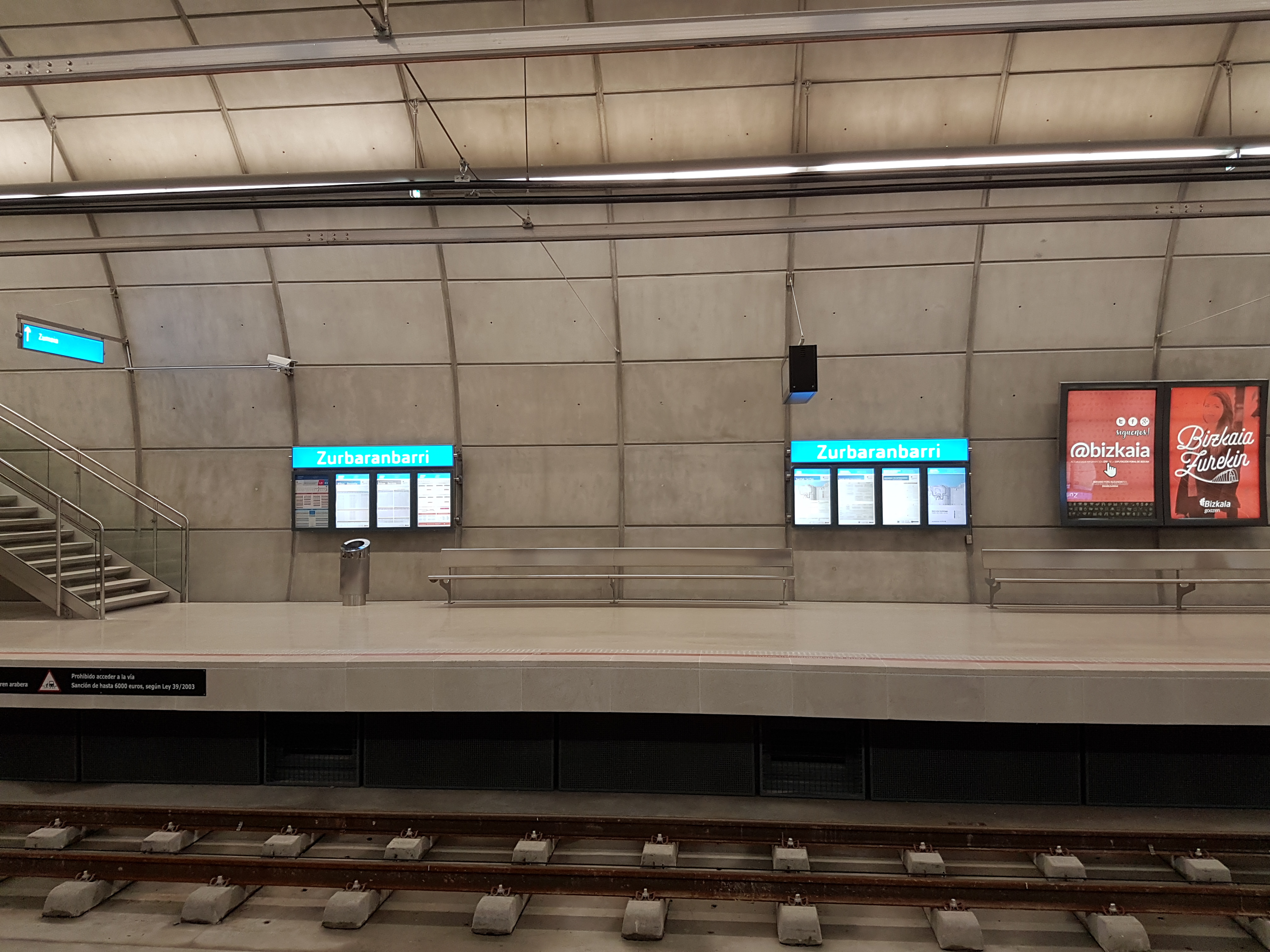
Station platforms
