= Zazpikaleak/Casco Viejo station =

Rapid transit station in Bilbao, Basque Country, Spain

Zazpikaleak/Casco Viejo
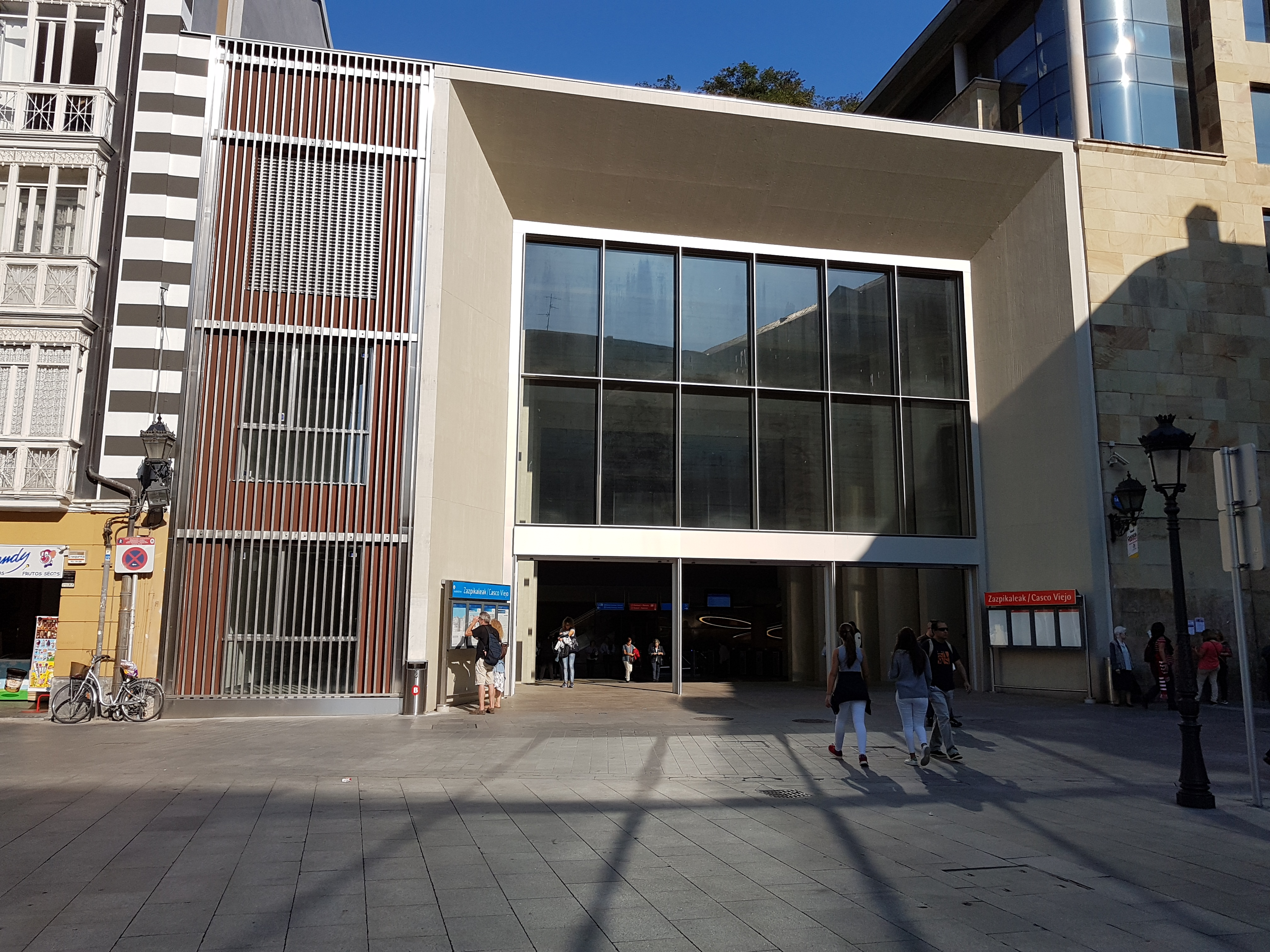
- Main entrance to the station

General information
- Location: 3, San Nicolás Square; 48005 Bilbao; Spain
- Coordinates: 43°15′36″N 2°55′19″W
- Owner: Biscay Transport Consortium; Euskal Trenbide Sarea
- Lines: Line 1; Line 2; Line 3; Line E1; Line E3; Line E4
- Platforms: 4 side platforms
- Tracks: 4
- Connections: Bus, tramway

Construction
- Structure type: Underground
- Platform levels: 2
- Parking: No
- Accessible: yes

Other information
- Fare zone: Zone 1

History
- Opened: 1 July 1904
- Closed: 15 May 2010
- Rebuilt: 8 April 2017
Location

Zazpikaleak/Casco Viejo – Zazpikaleak (Basque for 'Seven Streets') and Casco Viejo (Spanish for 'Old Town') – is a railway station in Bilbao, Basque Country, Spain. It is located in the historical neighborhood of Casco Viejo, in the district of Ibaiondo. It links the Bilbao Metro rapid transit services with the Euskotren Trena commuter rail network. It is the main railway hub for trips between the metropolitan underground network and the railway services to Eibar, Gernika, Bermeo and San Sebastián as well as the Txorierri valley. The original metro station opened on 11 November 1995, and on 8 April 2017 in its current form.

== History ==
The original station, named Bilbao-Aduana, was opened on 1 July 1904 as the terminus station of the narrow-gauge Bilbao-Plencia railway, an expansion of the original Bilbao-Las Arenas line, which opened in 1887. The Aduana station replaced the older and less central Bilbao-San Agustín station. The station was located on the former site of a customs building for the city's harbor, hence the name Aduana (Spanish for 'customs office'). Bilbao-Aduana was an open-air station fitted between a hillside and the street. The trains emerged from a tunnel, named Esperanza tunnel due to its layout parallel to the street with the same name, before reaching the station platforms. The next station was Matico, an open-air station located in the neighborhood of Matiko, which was reached after traversing the Esperanza and Gas tunnels.

The station was operated by the Bilbao to Las Arenas and Plencia Railway Company until 1947, when it was merged with other narrow-gauge lines across the Bilbao metropolitan area to form Ferrocarriles y Transportes Suburbanos de Bilbao S.A. (Spanish for 'Railways and Suburban Transport of Bilbao', FTS for short) and the first precedent of today's Bilbao Metro. During this time the station became the main hub for the urban railway transit within the city of Bilbao and its metropolitan area, serving the line to Getxo and Plentzia, as well as being in close proximity to other important stations like Bilbao-Abando across the river and Bilbao-Calzadas, also part of the FTS network and with trains serving the Txorierri valley, just a few blocks away. During this time the name of the station was changed to Bilbao-San Nicolás and it also held the central offices for FTS. The name came from the neighboring San Nicolás church.

In 1977, the FTS network was transferred to the public company FEVE and in 1982 to the newly created Euskotren. After the transfer, it was announced that parts of the Bilbao-Plencia line would be renewed and transformed into the first line of the Bilbao Metro (specifically the section between Deusto and Plentzia), and thus management of the station facilities was transferred to the Biscay Transport Consortium in 1995. As part of the renovation plans, the original station was demolished and replaced with a more modern one that included a new underground station for the metro and overground open-air platforms for the existing services between Deusto and Bilbao-San Nicolás, which remained separate from the metro network. In 1996 a new tunnel was constructed linking Bilbao-San Nicolás with the former Bilbao-Calzadas station, thus linking it with the Txorierri line. The new line ran from Deusto to Lezama and resulted from the merging of the section of the Bilbao-Plencia railway that was not integrated into the metro (from Deusto to Bilbao-San Nicolás) and the line between Bilbao-Calzadas and Lezama. The new line was operated by Euskotren. The station was then once again renamed from Bilbao-San Nicolás to Zazpikaleak (Basque for 'seven streets', the historical name of the old city), while the underground station was named Casco Viejo (Spanish for 'old town') and was operated by Metro Bilbao, S.A.

In 2007, the project for Line 3 of the metro was unveiled. The new line would link Etxebarri and Bilbao via the Otxarkoaga-Txurdinaga district, reaching the old town and the Matiko area. The project involved a new transfer station in the Zazpikaleak station, as well as a renovation of the section between Zazpikaleak and the Zumalakarregi and Matiko stations that until then were part of the Deusto-Lezama line. In 2009 the Basque Government presented the project for the new railway connection with Bilbao Airport, which included a connection from Matiko to the Airport via Sondika. This involved the integration of the Deusto-Lezama line into two new lines, which would be operated by Euskotren instead of Metro Bilbao, S.A. as the other metro lines. The new Line 3 would connect in Etxebarri with the main Euskotren railway line to Bermeo and San Sebastián, which would allow to divert trains through the new Zazpikaleak station, concentrating all Euskotren services in a single station.

The section between Deusto and Zazpikaleak was closed down to railway traffic on 15 May 2010 once construction for the new line began. In June 2015, the Zazpikaleak station was closed down to be demolished to build a new one in its place. The new station was opened on 8 April 2017 with the new name Zazpikaleak/Casco Viejo.

== Station layout ==
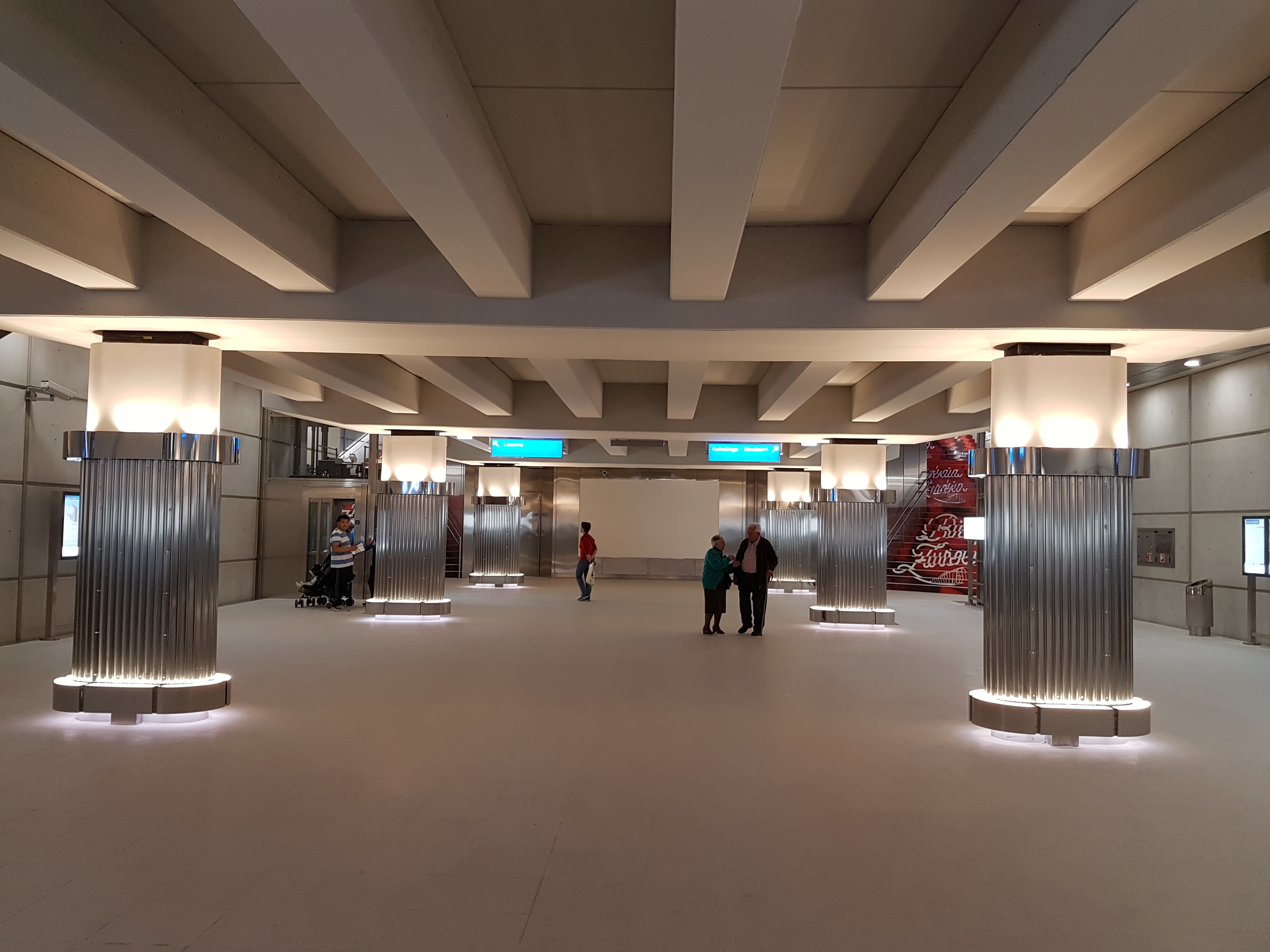
Hall under the Euskotren station.

The original station built in 1904 was an open-air station with two side platforms located behind the station building. The ticket offices and waiting rooms were on the ground floor, as was the access to the platforms. The rest of the building included offices for the railway administration as well as apartments for its workers. After the first renovation made in the 1990s, the building included a main hall with separate access to the Euskotren platforms, which were located on their original situation elevated behind the station, and the Bilbao Metro platforms, which were underground and followed the same cavern-like architecture as those in the rest of the network, designed by Norman Foster.

The current station has a large common hall with ticket and customer care offices. There are two platform levels: one of them is used by Euskotren services (including Line 3 of the metro), while the other is used by Lines 1 and 2 of the metro. As part of the works for Line 3, the Euskotren station was rebuilt and put underground in the same location as the original railway station.

=== Access ===
- 3, San Nicolás Square (Lines 3, E1 and E3 of Euskotren Trena)
- 3, San Nicolás Square (Lines 1 and 2 of the Bilbao Metro, San Nicolás - Euskotren exit)
- 1, Miguel de Unamuno Plaza (Unamuno exit, Lines 1 and 2 only)
- 28, Mallona (Begoña exit, Lines 1 and 2 only)

== Services ==
When the station first opened in 1904 as Bilbao-Aduana, it served as the terminus station of the Bilbao-Plencia railway, which linked the city with other municipalities within the Greater Bilbao area as Leioa, Getxo and Plentzia. After 1996 it became part of the suburban line operated by Euskotren from Deusto to Lezama, with services to Derio, Sondika and Zamudio. Since 2019 it serves as a stop for all commuter rail services offered by Euskotren in Biscay.

The station served as the southern terminus for Line 1 of the metro from its opening in 1995 until the opening of Bolueta station in 1997. Currently, it serves as a connection hub between the three lines of the network. Unlike the two other lines of the Bilbao Metro system (which are operated by Metro Bilbao, S.A.), Line 3 is operated by Euskotren, which runs it as part of the Euskotren Trena network. Trains from the Bilbao–San Sebastián, Txorierri and Urdaibai lines of the network run through Line 3. The station is also served by local Bilbobus and regional Bizkaibus bus services. The station is at walking distance from the Arriaga stop of the Bilbao tram.

Preceding station	Metro Bilbao	Following station
Abando towards Plentzia	Line 1	Santutxu towards Etxebarri
Abando towards Kabiezes	Line 2	Santutxu towards Basauri
Preceding station	Euskotren Trena	Following station
Uribarri towards Matiko	Line 3	Zurbaranbarri towards Kukullaga
Uribarri towards Matiko	Line E1	Zurbaranbarri towards Pasaia
Uribarri towards Lezama	Line E3	Zurbaranbarri towards Kukullaga
Uribarri towards Matiko	Line E4	Zurbaranbarri towards Bermeo

== Gallery ==
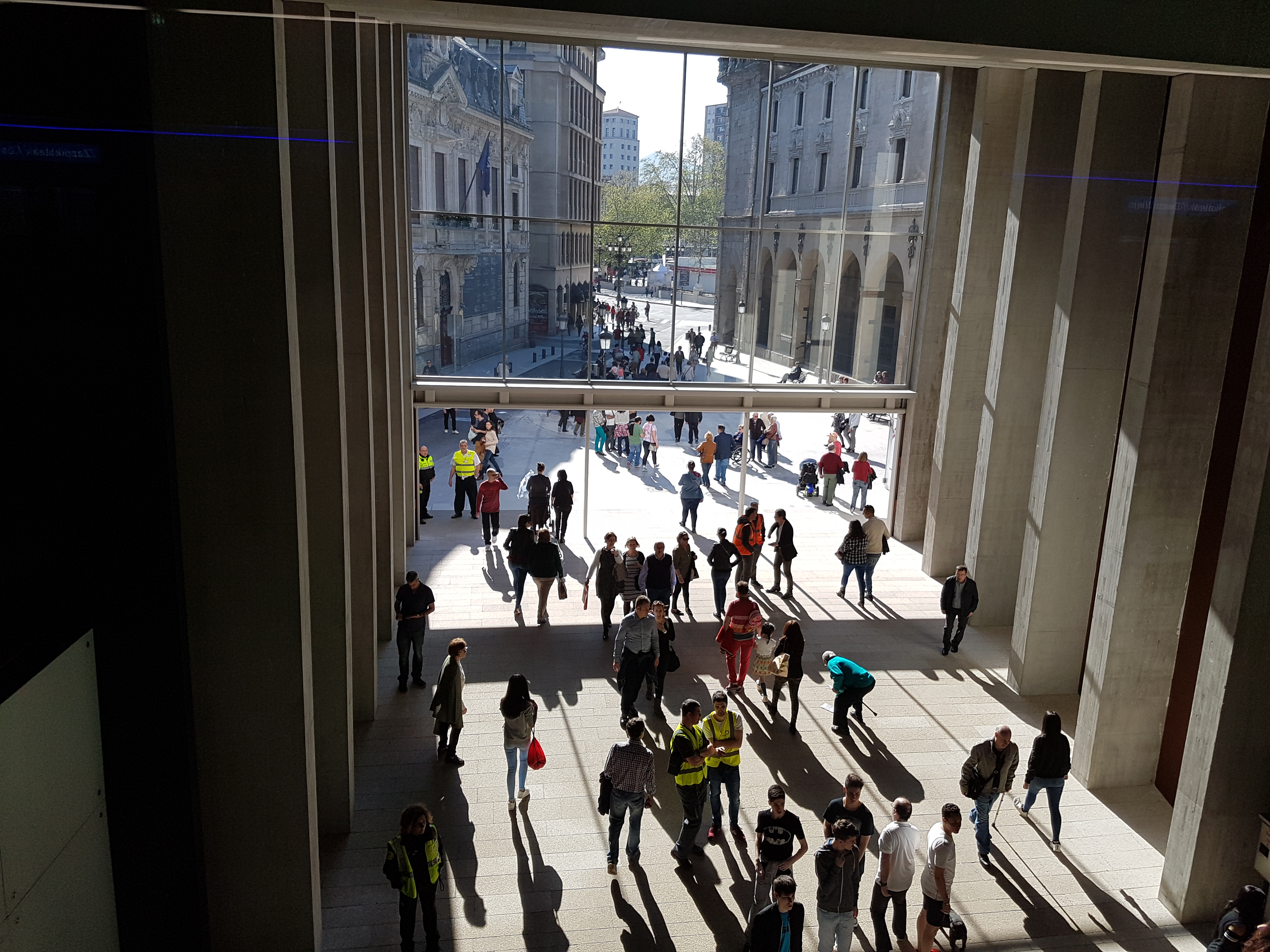
Station's entrance on opening day

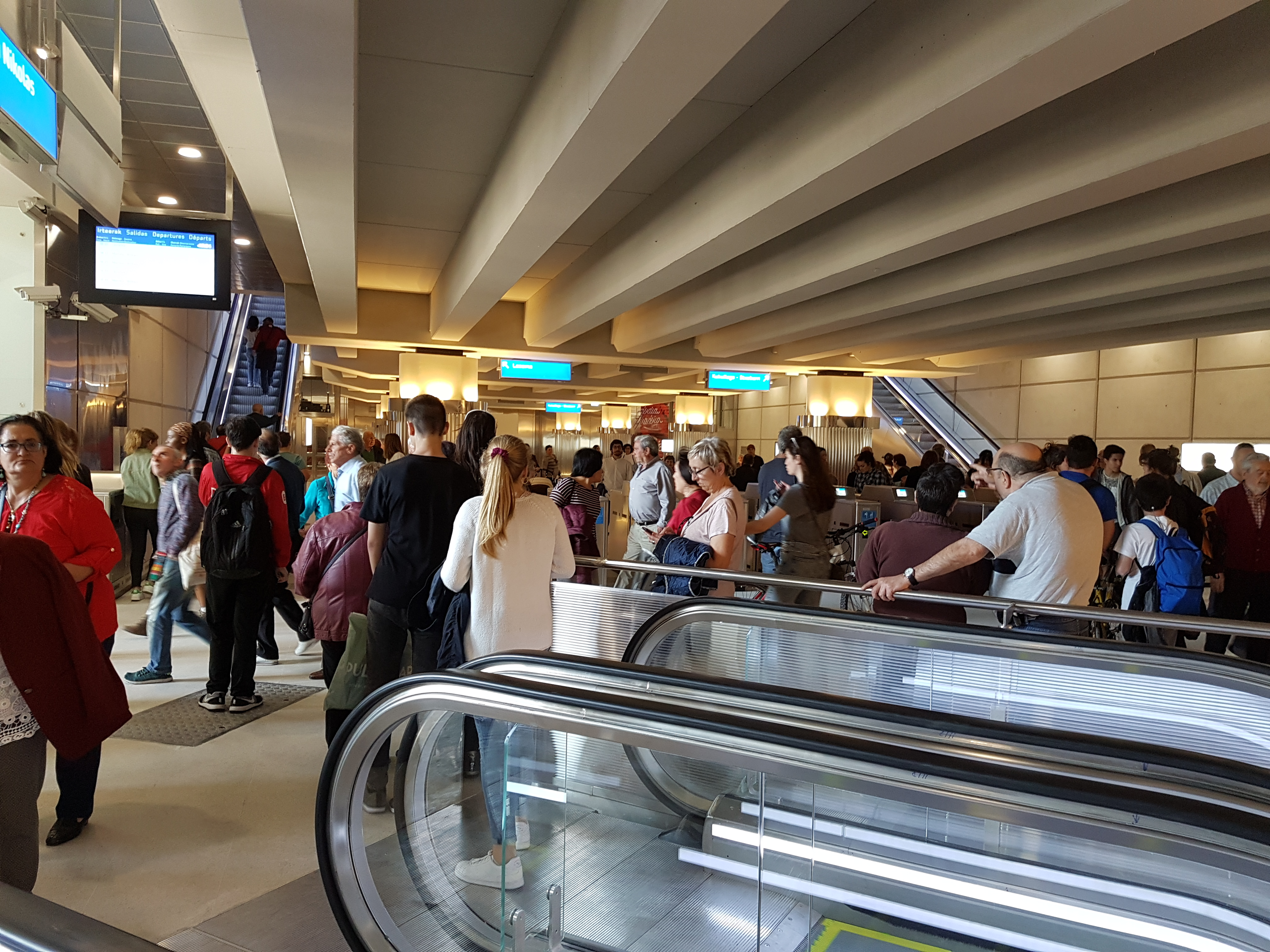
Main hall on opening day

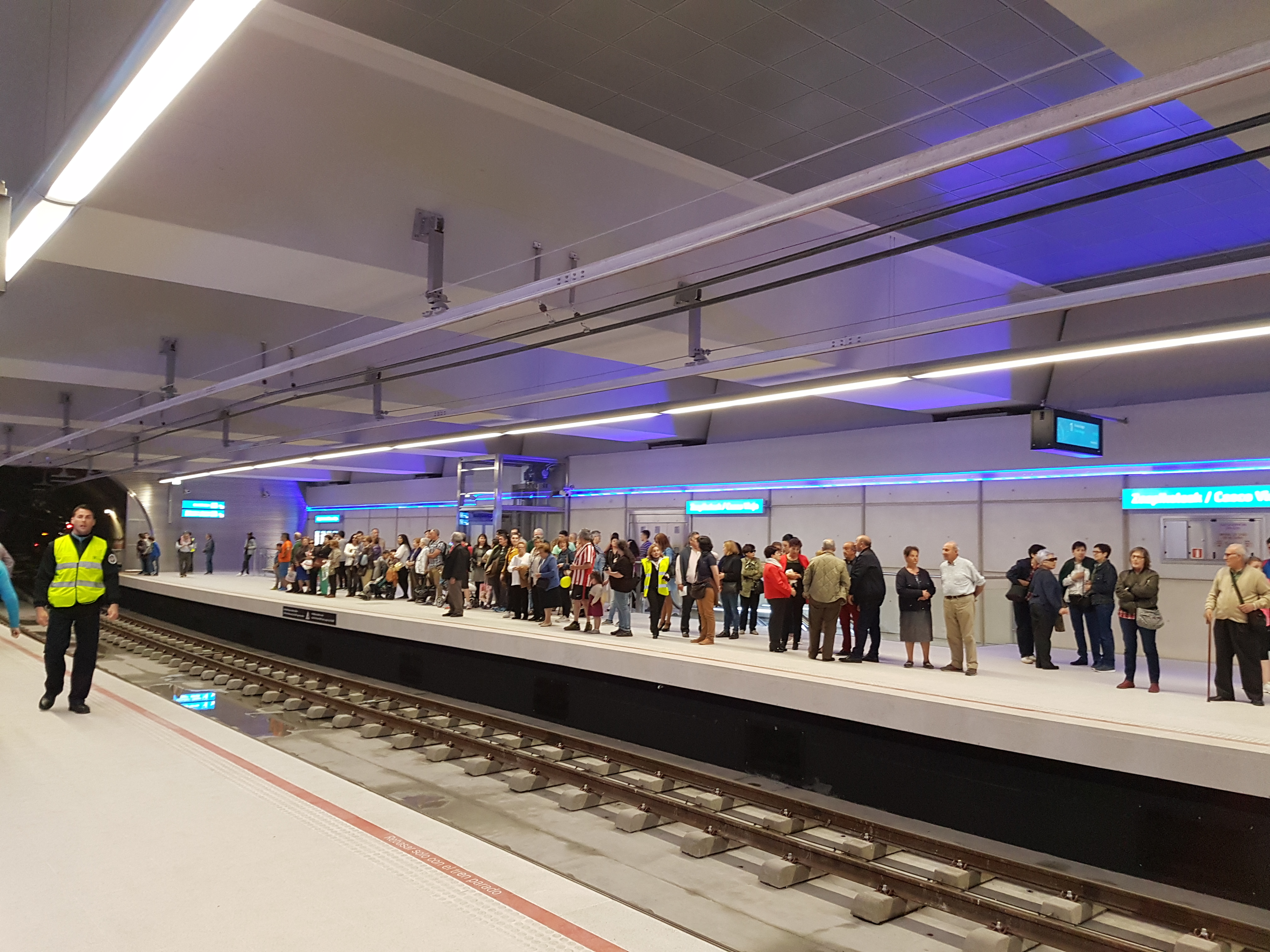
Euskotren platforms

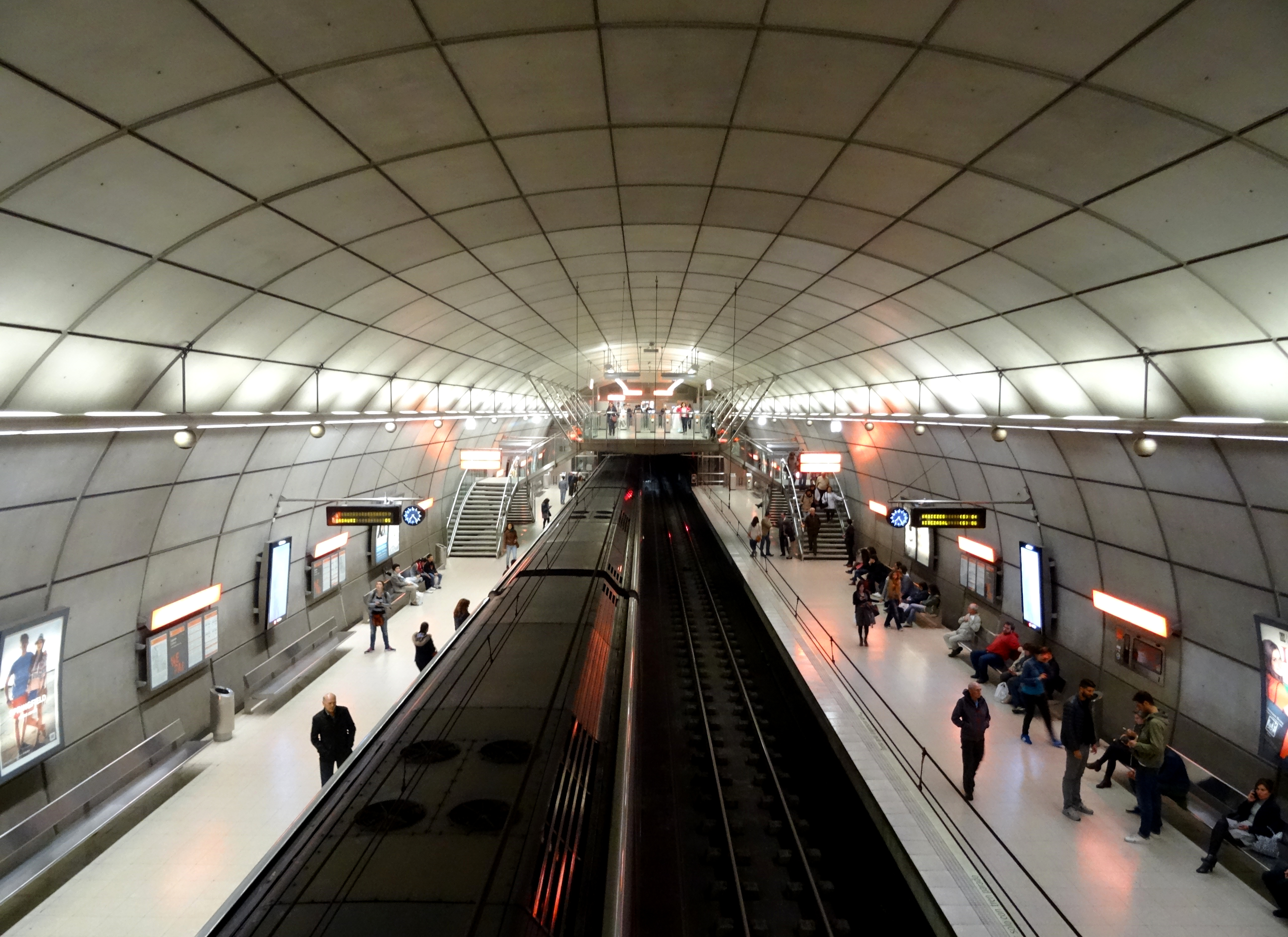
Platforms for Lines 1 and 2
