= Uribarri station =

Railway station in Bilbao, Basque Country, Spain

Uribarri
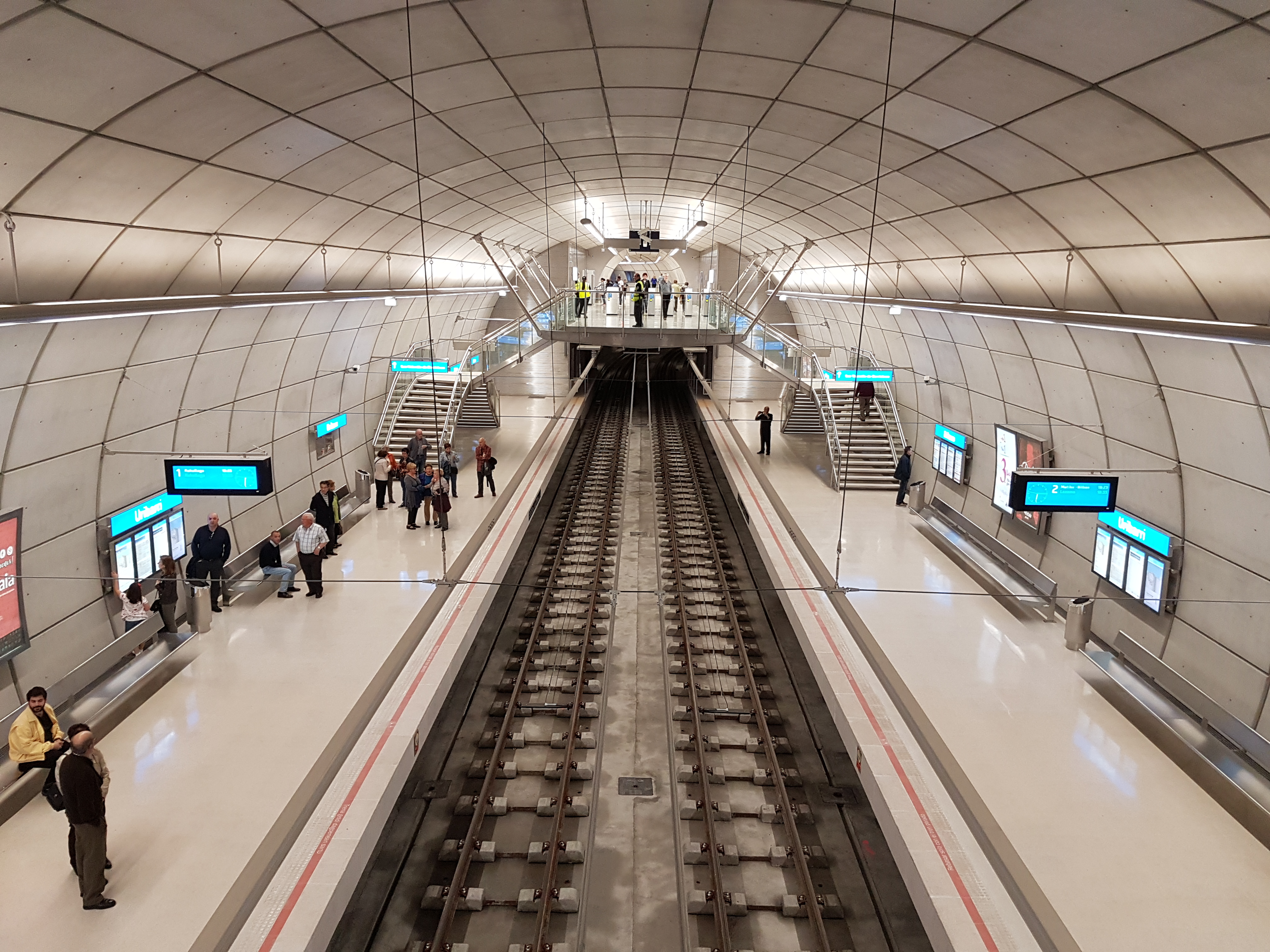
- View of platforms and tracks

General information
- Location: 10-12 Trauko St. 48007 Bilbao; Spain
- Coordinates: 43°16′01″N 2°55′13″W
- Owner: Euskal Trenbide Sarea
- Lines: Line 3; Line E1; Line E3; Line E4
- Platforms: 2 side platforms
- Tracks: 2

Construction
- Structure type: Underground
- Platform levels: 1
- Parking: No
- Accessible: Yes

Other information
- Fare zone: Zone 1

History
- Opened: 8 April 2017
Location

Uribarri is a station on Line 3 of the Bilbao Metro and Euskotren Trena commuter and regional rail services. The station is located in the neighborhood of Uribarri, part of the district with the same name, in Bilbao. It opened on 8 April 2017.

== Station layout ==
Uribarri follows the same cavern-like station layout shared by most underground stations of the system, designed by Norman Foster, with the main hall located suspended directly above the tracks.

=== Entrances ===
- 11 Travesía Uribarri C
- 7 San Valentín de Berriotxoa St.
- Escuelas de Uribarri Plaza
- 15 Zumalakarregi Av. (Zumalakarregi exit)
- Travesía Uribarri C, Monte Izaro St.

== Services ==
Unlike the two other lines of the Bilbao Metro system (which are operated by Metro Bilbao, S.A.), Line 3 is operated by Euskotren, which runs it as part of the Euskotren Trena network. Trains from the Bilbao–San Sebastián, Txorierri and Urdaibai lines of the network run through Line 3.

Preceding station	Euskotren Trena	Following station
Matiko Terminus	Line 3	Zazpikaleak/Casco Viejo towards Kukullaga
Matiko Terminus	Line E1	Zazpikaleak/Casco Viejo towards Pasaia
Matiko towards Lezama	Line E3	Zazpikaleak/Casco Viejo towards Kukullaga
Matiko Terminus	Line E4	Zazpikaleak/Casco Viejo towards Bermeo

== Gallery ==
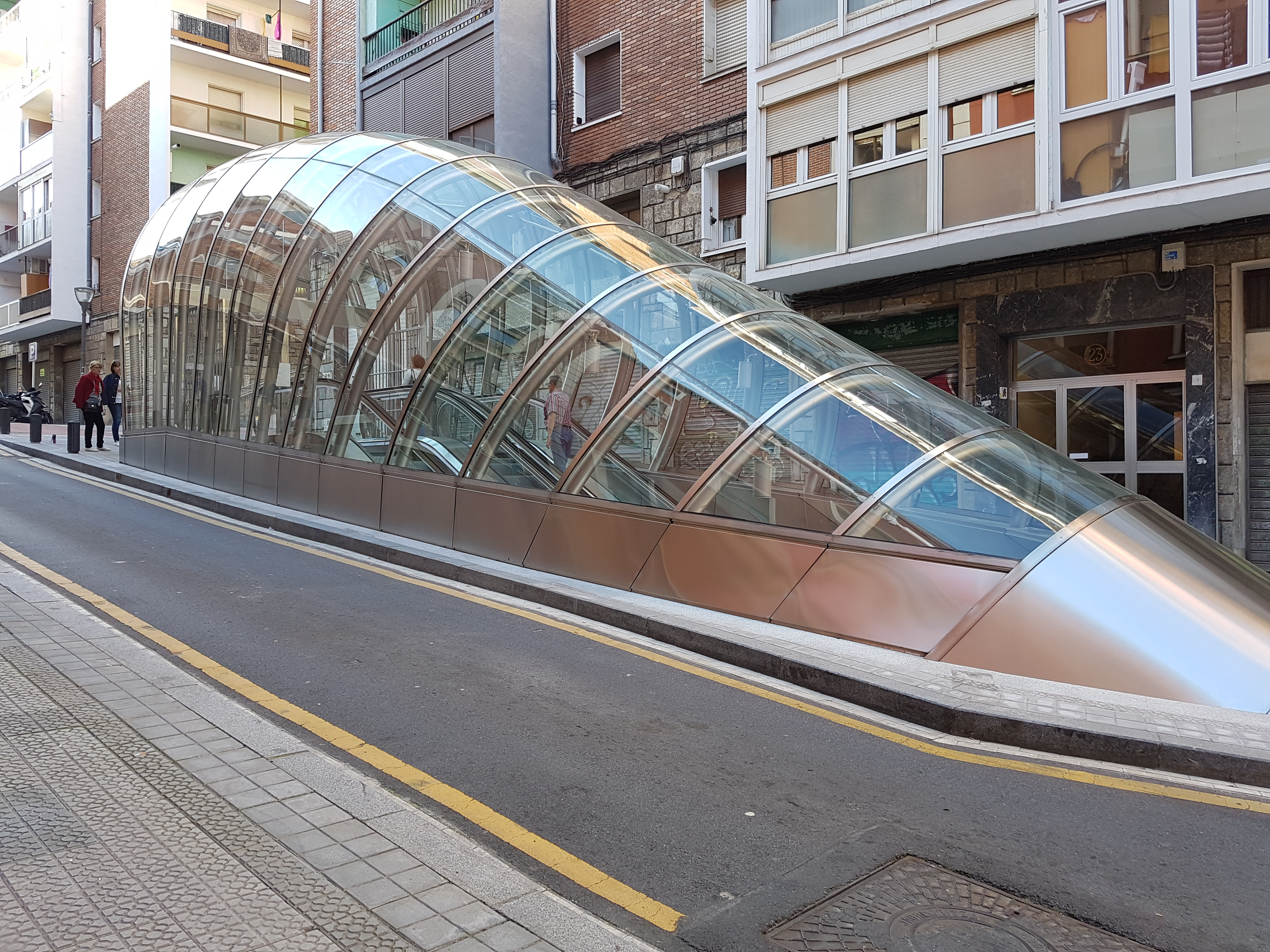
Fosterito, station entrance

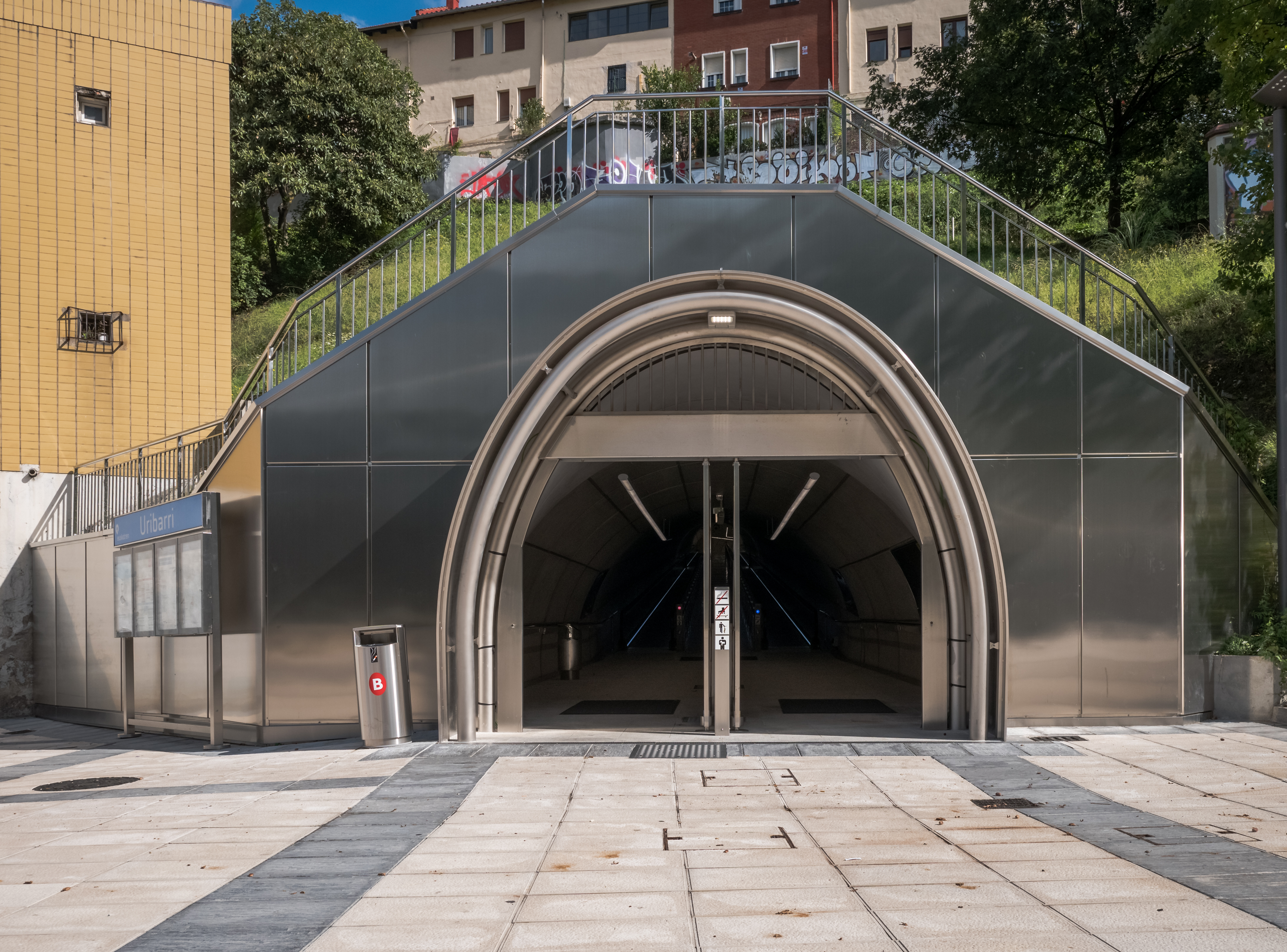
Access through Zumalakarregi Ave.

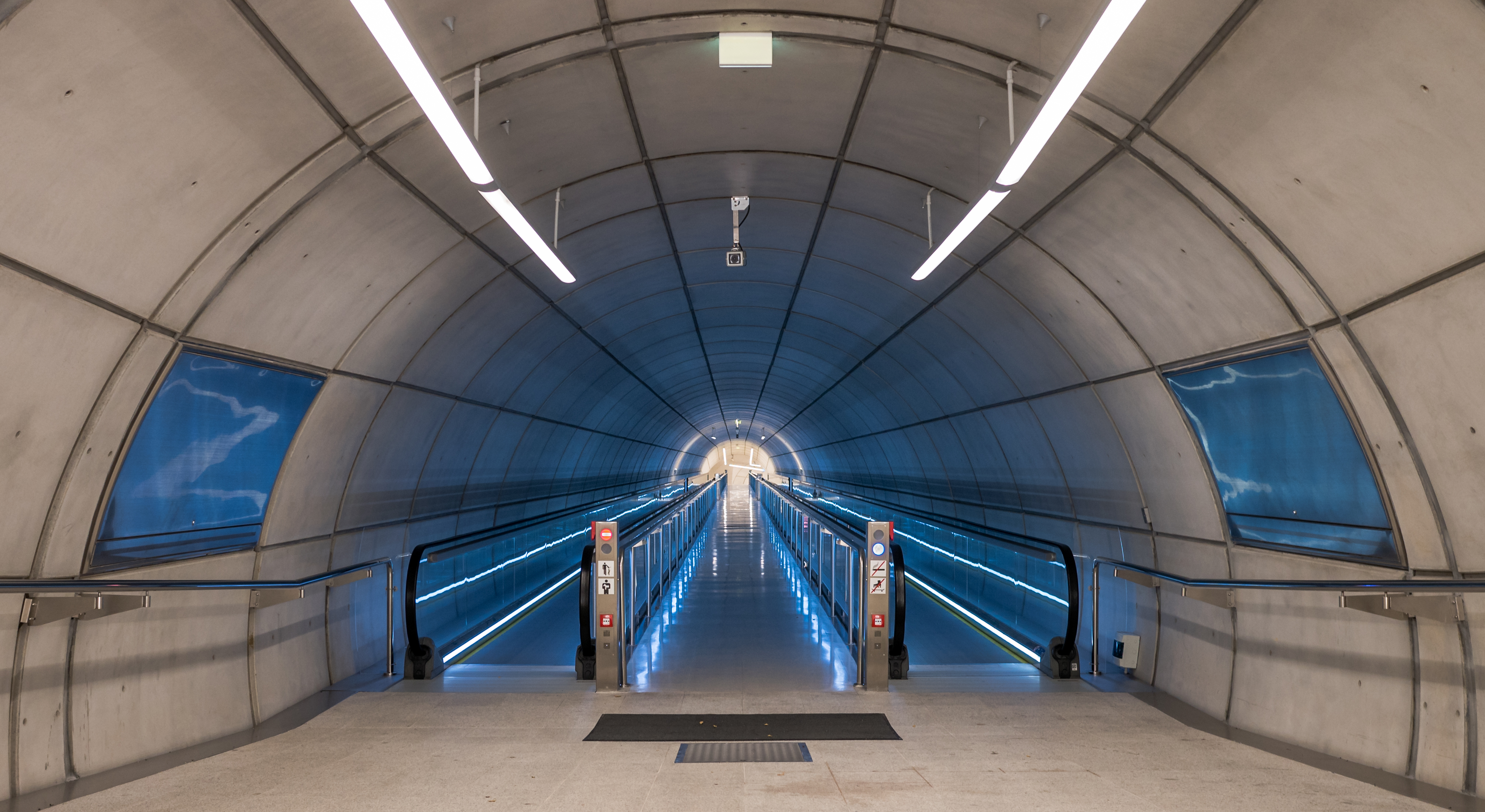
Access tunnels
