= Txurdinaga station =

Railway station in Bilbao, Basque Country, Spain

Txurdinaga
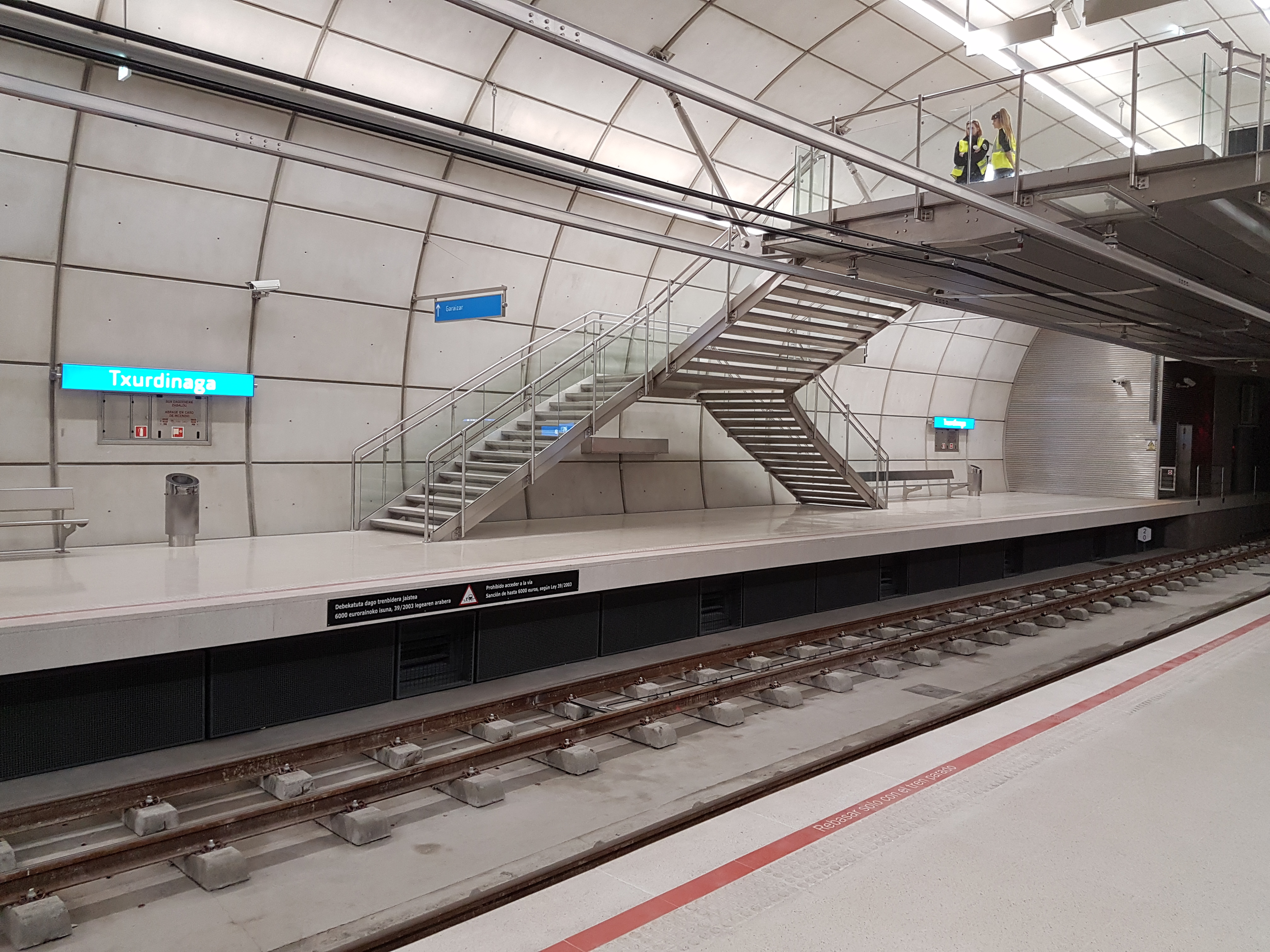
- View of the platforms and tracks

General information
- Location: 35-37, Gabriel Aresti Av. 48004 Bilbao; Spain
- Coordinates: 43°15′34″N 2°54′23″W
- Owner: Euskal Trenbide Sarea
- Lines: Line 3; Line E1; Line E3; Line E4
- Platforms: 2 side platforms
- Tracks: 2
- Connections: Bus

Construction
- Structure type: Underground
- Platform levels: 1
- Parking: No
- Accessible: Yes

Other information
- Fare zone: Zone 1

History
- Opened: 8 April 2017
Location

Txurdinaga is a station on Line 3 of the Bilbao Metro and Euskotren Trena commuter and regional rail services. The station is located in the neighborhood of Txurdinaga, part of the Otxarkoaga-Txurdinaga district of Bilbao. It opened on 8 April 2017.

== Station layout ==
Txurdinaga follows the same cavern-like station layout shared by most underground stations of the system, designed by Norman Foster, with the main hall located suspended directly above the tracks.

=== Access ===
- 30 Gabriel Aresti Av. (Gabriel Aresti exit)
- Gurena St. (Garaizar exit, closed during night time services)
- Gabriel Aresti / Garai Gardens (Gabriel Aresti exit)

== Services ==
Unlike the two other lines of the Bilbao Metro system (which are operated by Metro Bilbao, S.A.), Line 3 is operated by Euskotren, which runs it as part of the Euskotren Trena network. Trains from the Bilbao–San Sebastián, Txorierri and Urdaibai lines of the network run through Line 3. The station is also served by two local Bilbobus lines.

Preceding station	Euskotren Trena	Following station
Zurbaranbarri towards Matiko	Line 3	Otxarkoaga towards Kukullaga
Zurbaranbarri towards Matiko	Line E1	Otxarkoaga towards Pasaia
Zurbaranbarri towards Lezama	Line E3	Otxarkoaga towards Kukullaga
Zurbaranbarri towards Matiko	Line E4	Otxarkoaga towards Bermeo

== Gallery ==
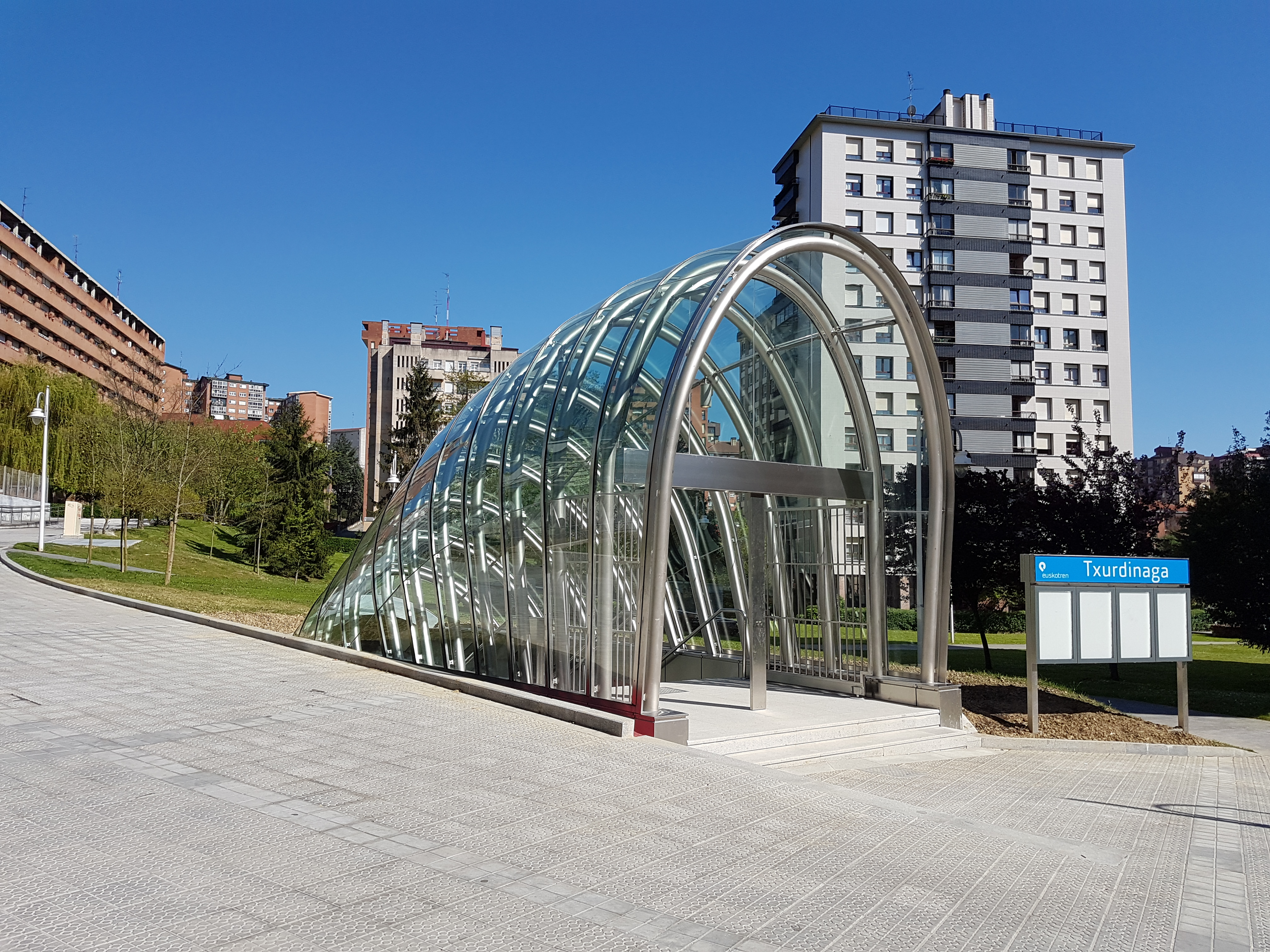
Fosterito, the station entrance

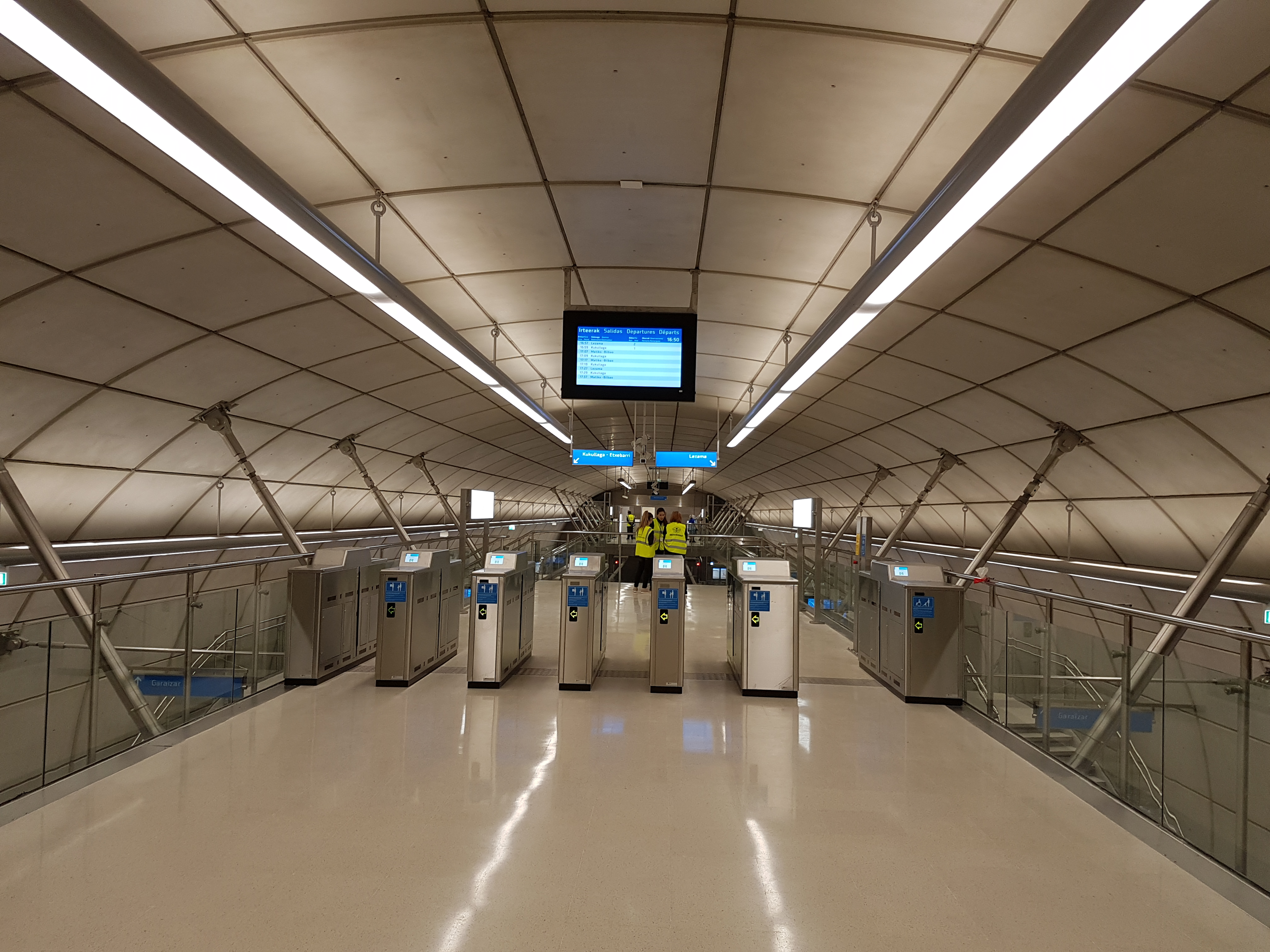
Ticket validation machines on hall above rail tracks

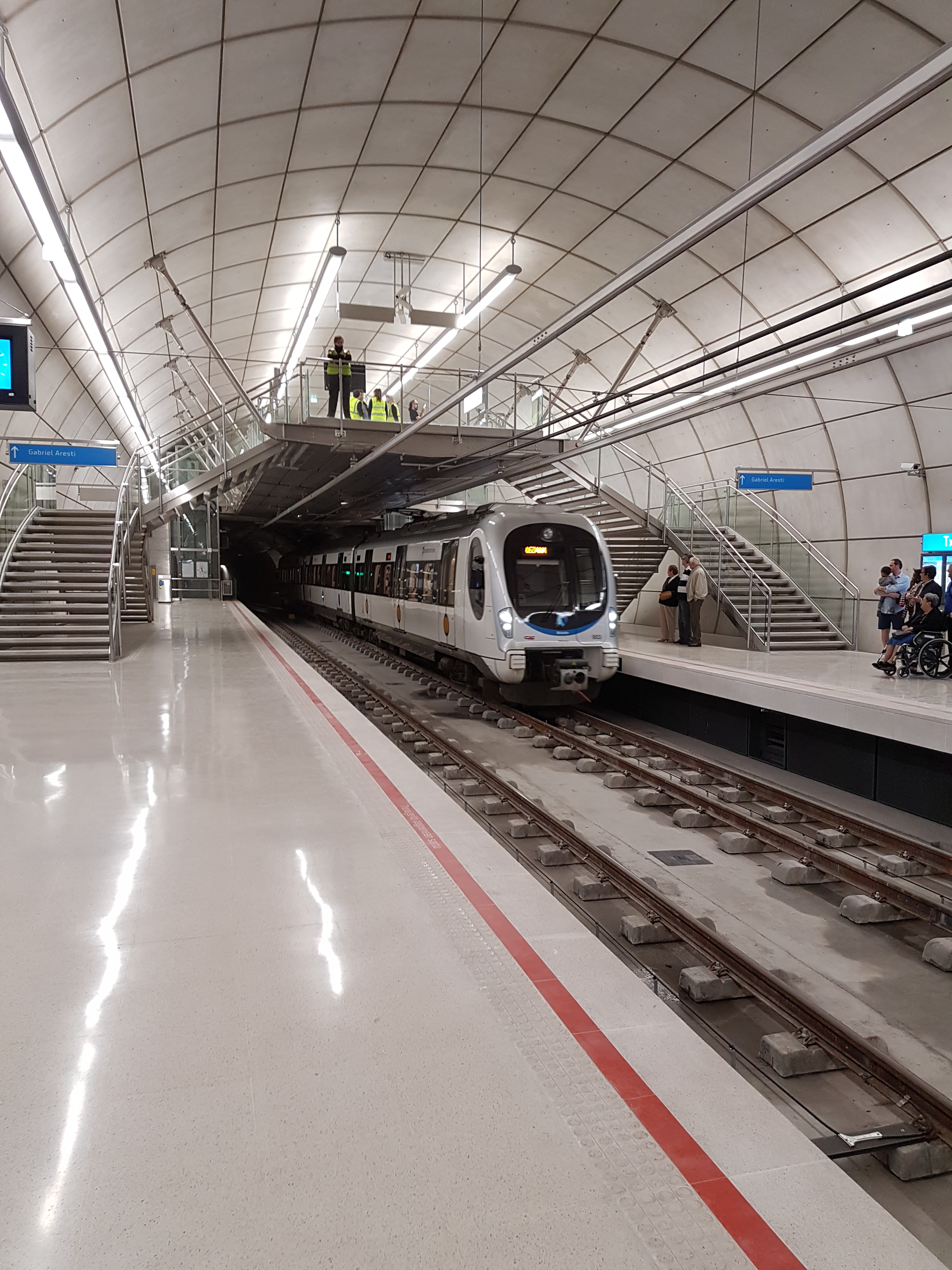
Station platforms
