= Derio station =

Railway station in Derio, Basque Country, Spain

Derio
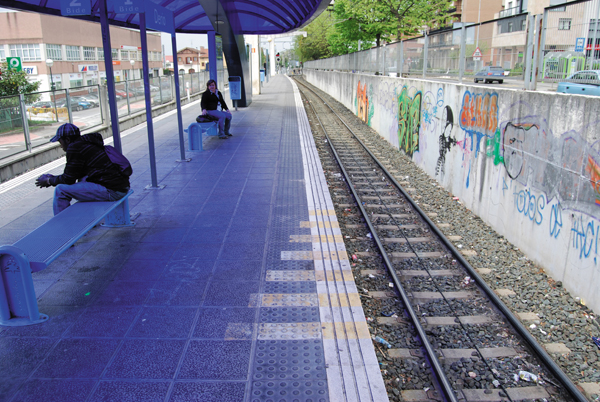
- View of the station before the 2018 renovation

General information
- Location: Derio, Biscay; Spain
- Coordinates: 43°17′27″N 2°53′13″W
- Owner: Euskal Trenbide Sarea
- Operator: Euskotren
- Line: Line E3
- Platforms: 1 island platform
- Tracks: 2

Construction
- Structure type: At-grade
- Parking: No
- Accessible: Yes

Other information
- Fare zone: Zone 2

History
- Opened: 2 May 1894

Services
Preceding station	Euskotren Trena	Following station
Lekunbiz towards Lezama	Line E3	Elotxelerri towards Kukullaga
Location

Derio is a railway station in Derio, Basque Country, Spain. It is owned by Euskal Trenbide Sarea and operated by Euskotren. It lies on the Txorierri line.

== History ==
The station was opened together with the Txorierri line in 1894. The station was originally located in the municipality of Zamudio, in front of Derio cemetery. In 1994, a new station was built a few hundred meters to the east, and the old station building was abandoned. The original station building had been tentatively listed for preservation in 2014, but was ultimately demolished in 2019.

The station was renovated between 2018 and 2020 after trains on the Txorierri line started running through metro Line 3.

== Services ==
The station is served by Euskotren Trena line E3. It runs every 15 minutes (in each direction) during weekdays, and every 30 minutes during weekends.
