= Otxarkoaga station =

Railway station in Bilbao, Basque Country, Spain

Otxarkoaga
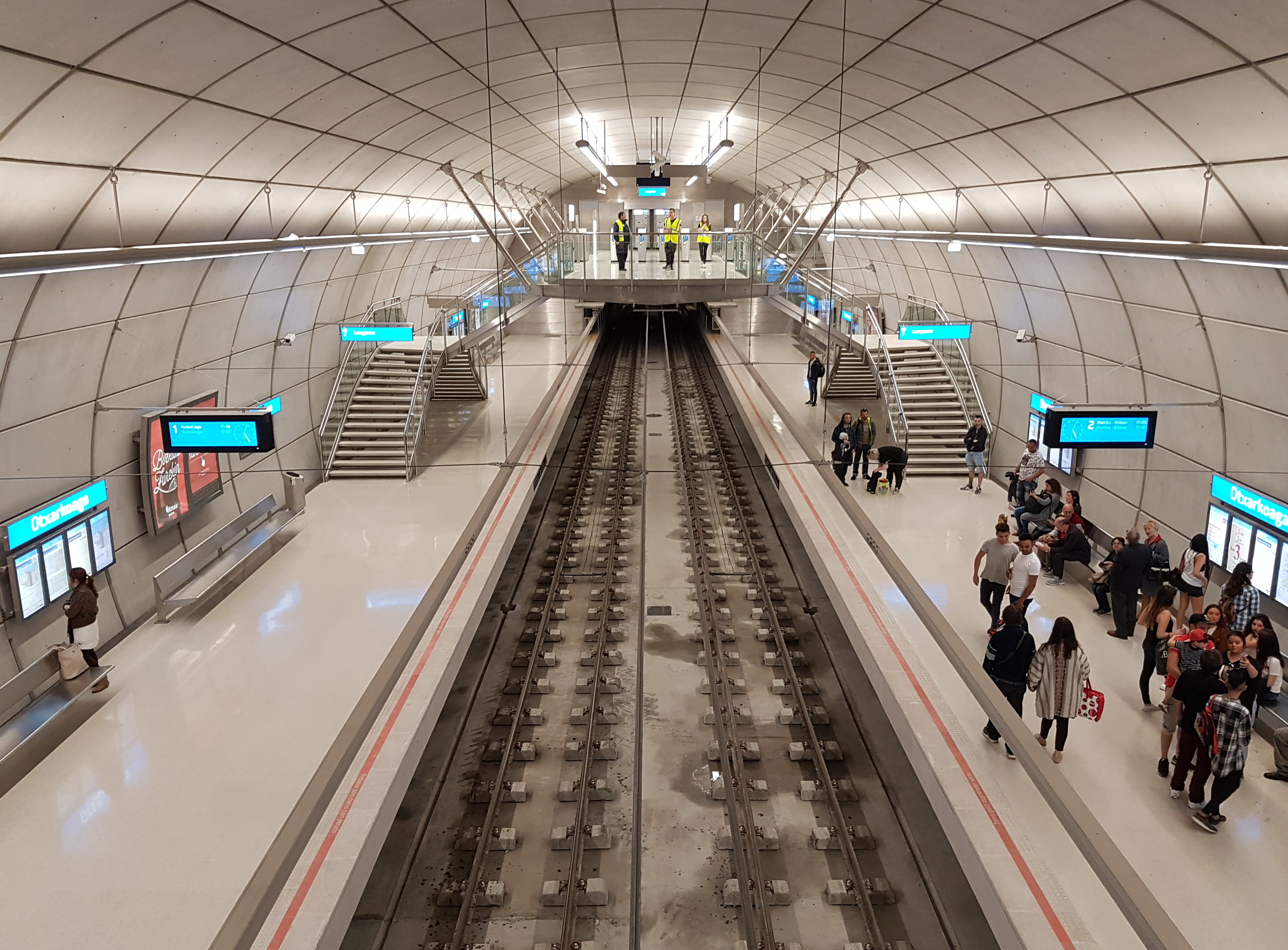
- View from the mezzanine

General information
- Location: 4, Lozoño St. 48004 Bilbao; Spain
- Coordinates: 43°15′29″N 2°54′03″W
- Owner: Euskal Trenbide Sarea
- Lines: Line 3; Line E1; Line E3; Line E4
- Platforms: 2 side platforms
- Tracks: 2
- Connections: Bus

Construction
- Structure type: Underground
- Platform levels: 1
- Parking: No
- Accessible: Yes

Other information
- Fare zone: Zone 1

History
- Opened: 8 April 2017
Location

Otxarkoaga is a station on Line 3 of the Bilbao Metro and Euskotren Trena commuter and regional rail services. The station is located in the neighborhood of Otxarkoaga, part of the Otxarkoaga-Txurdinaga district of Bilbao. It opened on 8 April 2017.

== Station layout ==
Txurdinaga follows the same cavern-like station layout shared by most underground stations of the system, designed by Norman Foster, with the main hall located directly above the tracks.

=== Access ===
- 1 Kepa Embeitia Plaza (Plaza Kepa Enbeitia exit)
- 23 Lozoño St. (Lozoño exit)
- 14 Langaran St. (Langaran exit)
- 8, Pau Casals Av.

== Services ==
Unlike the two other lines of the Bilbao Metro system (which are operated by Metro Bilbao, S.A.), Line 3 is operated by Euskotren, which runs it as part of the Euskotren Trena network. Trains from the Bilbao–San Sebastián, Txorierri and Urdaibai lines of the network run through Line 3. The station is also served by several local Bilbobus lines.

Preceding station	Euskotren Trena	Following station
Txurdinaga towards Matiko	Line 3	Kukullaga Terminus
Txurdinaga towards Matiko	Line E1	Kukullaga towards Pasaia
Txurdinaga towards Lezama	Line E3	Kukullaga Terminus
Txurdinaga towards Matiko	Line E4	Kukullaga towards Bermeo

== Gallery ==
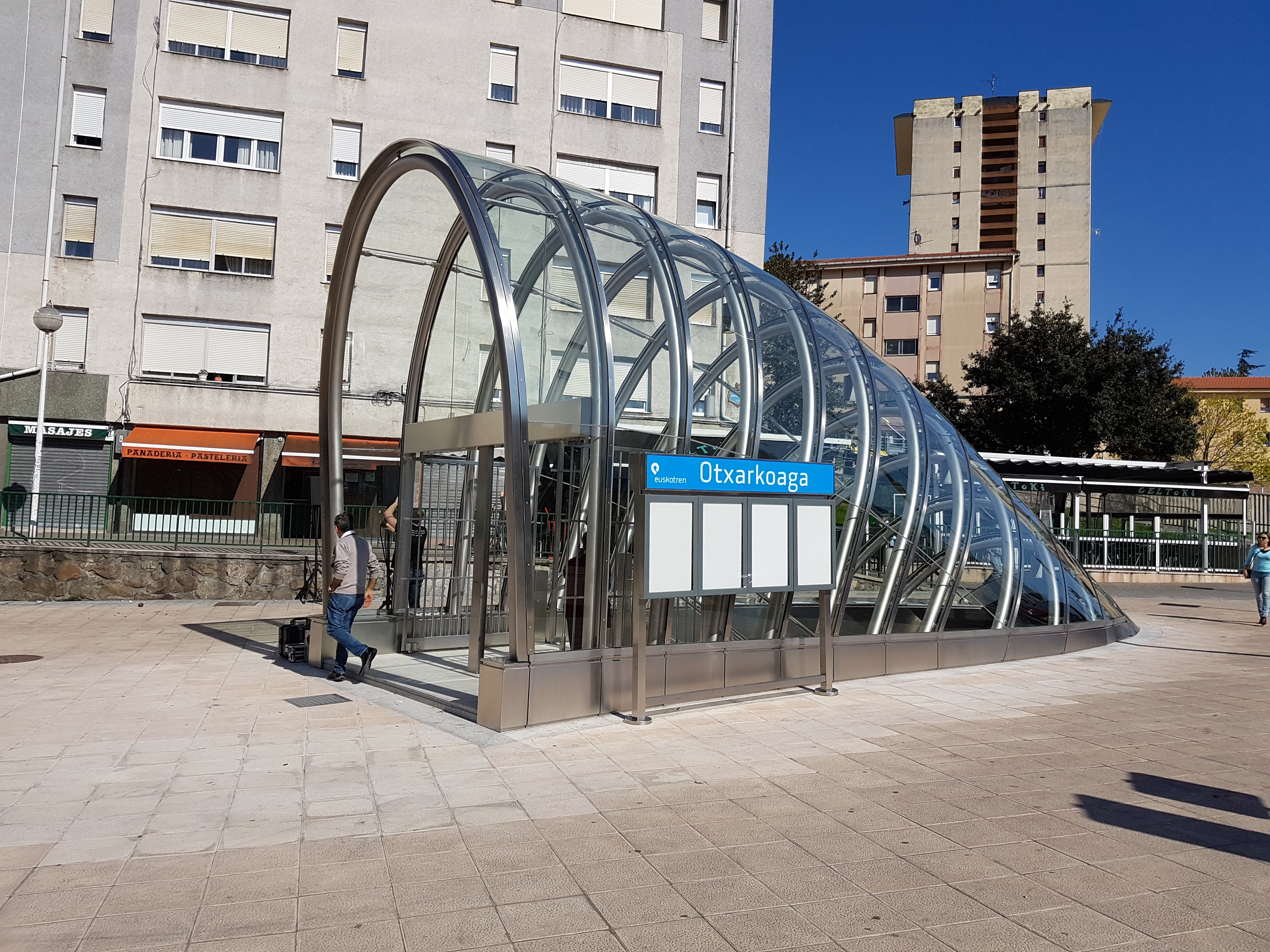
Fosterito, the station entrance

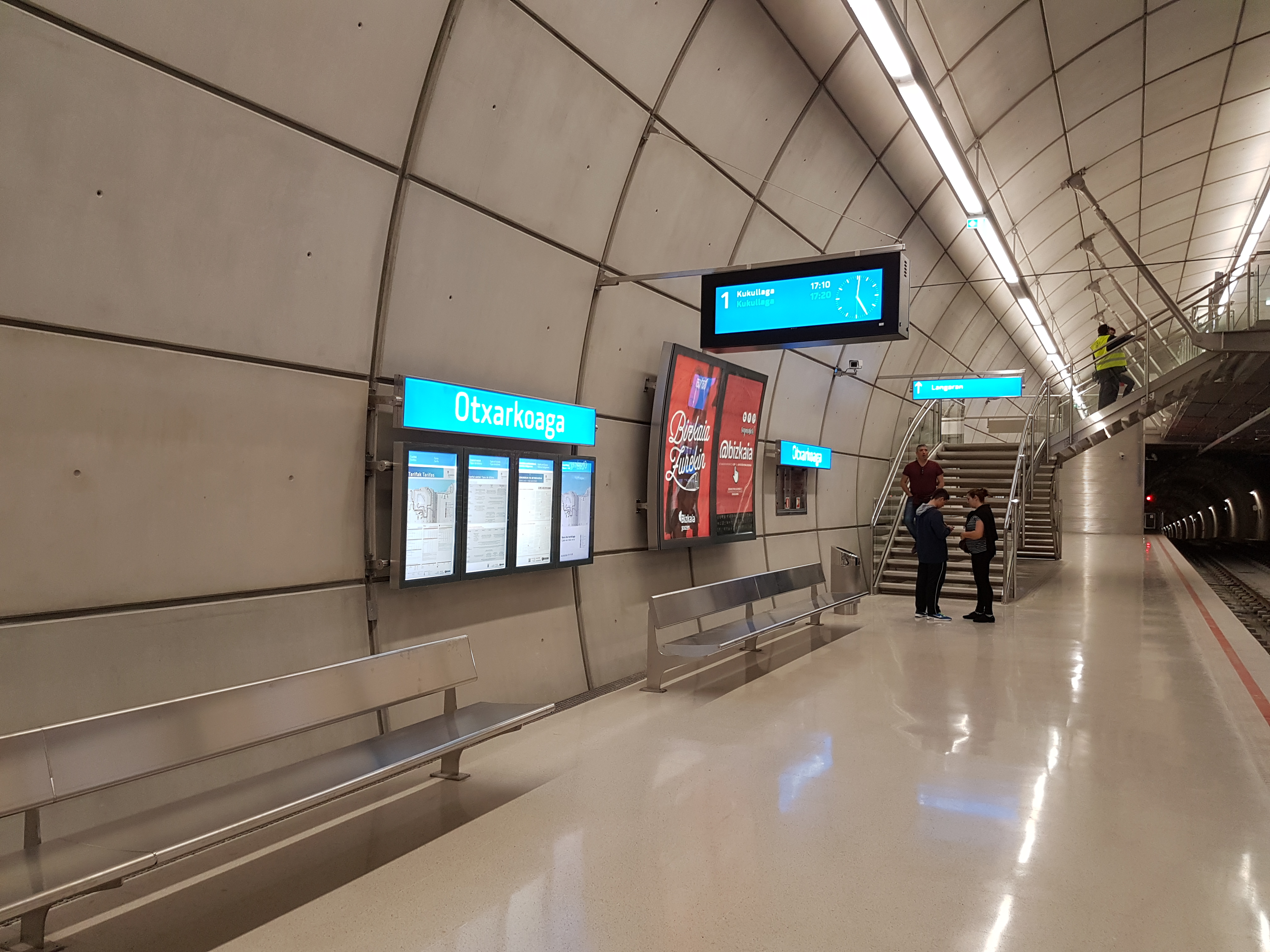
Station platform
