= Matiko station =

Railway station in Bilbao, Basque Country, Spain

Matiko
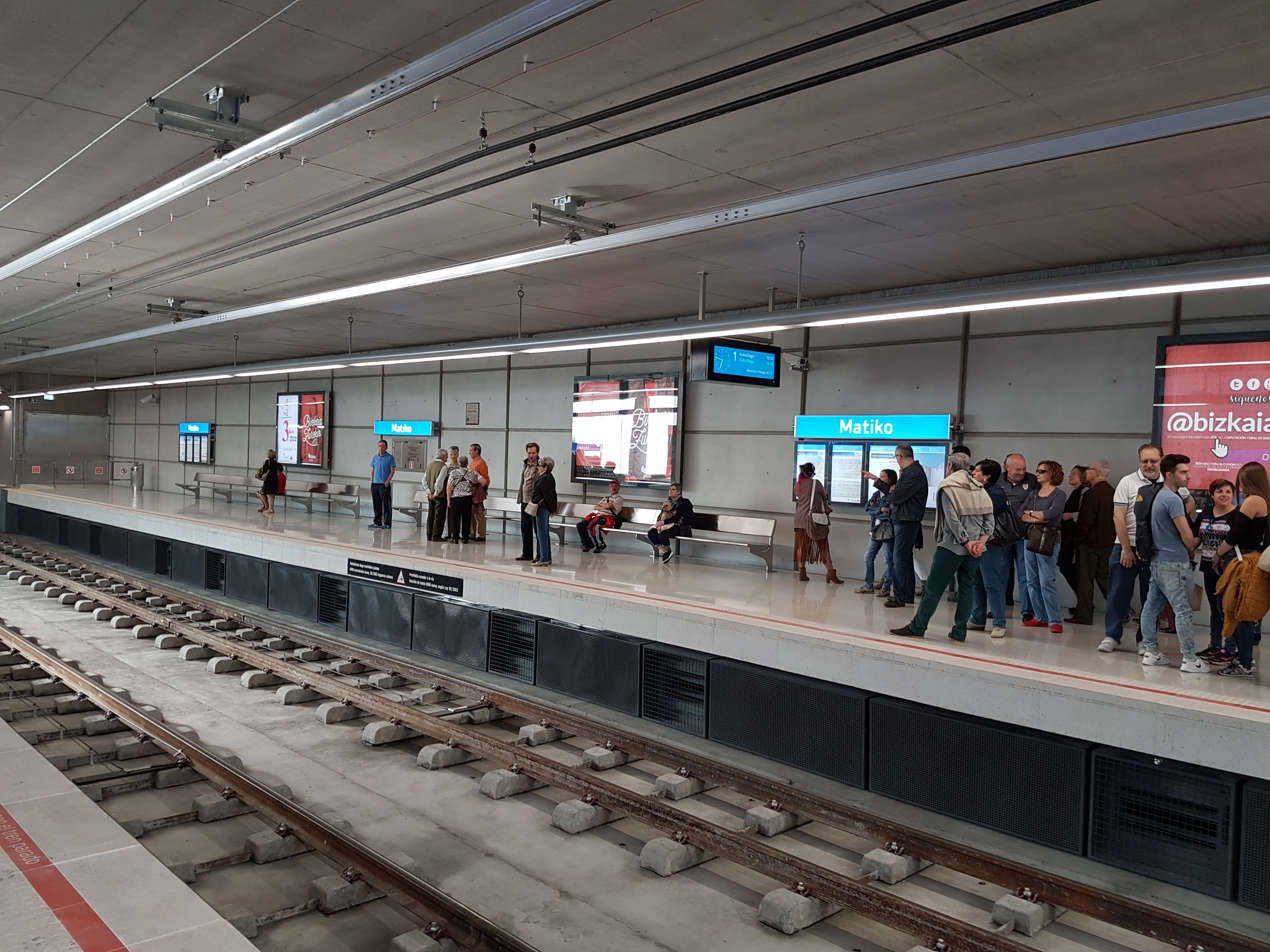
- View of platforms and tracks

General information
- Location: 30 Tiboli St. 48007 Bilbao; Spain
- Coordinates: 43°16′08″N 2°55′30″W
- Owner: Euskal Trenbide Sarea
- Lines: Line 3; Line E1; Line E3; Line E4
- Platforms: 2 side platforms
- Tracks: 2
- Connections: Artxanda Funicular

Construction
- Structure type: Underground
- Platform levels: 1
- Parking: No
- Accessible: Yes

Other information
- Fare zone: Zone 1

History
- Opened: 30 June 1887
- Closed: 15 May 2010
- Rebuilt: 8 April 2017
Location

Matiko is a station on Line 3 of the Bilbao Metro and Euskotren Trena commuter and regional rail services. The station is the northern terminus of metro Line 3. The station is located in the neighbourhood of Matiko-Ciudad Jardín, part of the Uribarri district of Bilbao. In its current form, the station opened on 8 April 2017.

== History ==
The original station, named Matico, opened on 30 June 1887 as part of the narrow-gauge Bilbao-Las Arenas railway, which connected the city of Bilbao with Getxo. Matico was also the terminus station of the Matico-Azbarren railway, a narrow-gauge mostly underground suburban railway that connected the peripheral municipality of Basauri with central Bilbao at Matico. The station was an open-air station located in a trench in the Matiko neighbourhood; to the south the railtracks entered two different tunnels, one headed to Bilbao-San Agustín station, terminus of the Bilbao-Las Arenas railway, and another towards Azbarren, as part of the Matico-Azbarren railway, whereas to the north a single railtrack continued to the University of Deusto station. In 1904 it was integrated into the Bilbao-Plencia railway, and a third tunnel was opened towards Bilbao-Aduana station, which replaced Bilbao-San Agustín as the terminus station of the line.

During the early 20th century, three different railway lines called or passed through Matico station; the passenger Bilbao-Plencia and Matico-Azbarren railways and freight trains headed to Bilbao-San Agustín station. Matico station became a relevant hub for the city's narrow gauge railways, due to being the location of where the single railtrack coming from Getxo and Plentzia branched into three different tunnels. In 1947 the city's narrow gauge railways merged to form the Ferrocarriles y Transportes Suburbanos de Bilbao S.A. (Railways and Suburban Transport of Bilbao), shortened FTS and the first precedent of today's Bilbao Metro. The branch towards Bilbao-San Agustín was closed down in 1973 In 1977 the FTS network was transferred to the public company FEVE and in 1982 to the recently created Euskotren. The station, then renamed Matiko following the modern Basque orthography, was then part of a series of renovation projects commissioned by the Basque Government which included the creation of the Bilbao Metro's Line 1 using sections of the Bilbao-Plencia and Matico-Azbarren railways, which caused Matiko to become disconnected from both lines, as the station was not part of the new metro network. The tunnel and railtrack connecting the station with Azbarren were closed down.

After the opening of the Bilbao Metro in 1995, Matiko was integrated into the new Txorierri line operated separately by Euskotren and that ran between Deusto and Zazpikaleak through the sections that had not been integrated into the metro network, and from there to Lezama in the Txorierri valley. The station was partially renovated with a new island platform, while maintaining the original open-air structure of the original station.

The project for metro Line 3 was made public in 2007. The new line was planned to connect Etxebarri and Matiko through the Otxarkoaga-Txurdinaga district and the old town. The project involved the renovation of the Matiko station, and the works were commissioned in 2010. The new project involved Matiko becoming the northern terminus of the new line, before connecting to a new tunnel through Mount Artxanda to ensure connection with the existing Txorierri line. As a consequence, the section between Deusto and Matiko, the last remaining from the former Bilbao-Plencia line, were dismantled, shutting down the services in Deusto and Deusto-University stations in 2010. Matiko station was also closed down to be demolished, with the plans of a new one to be built in its place.

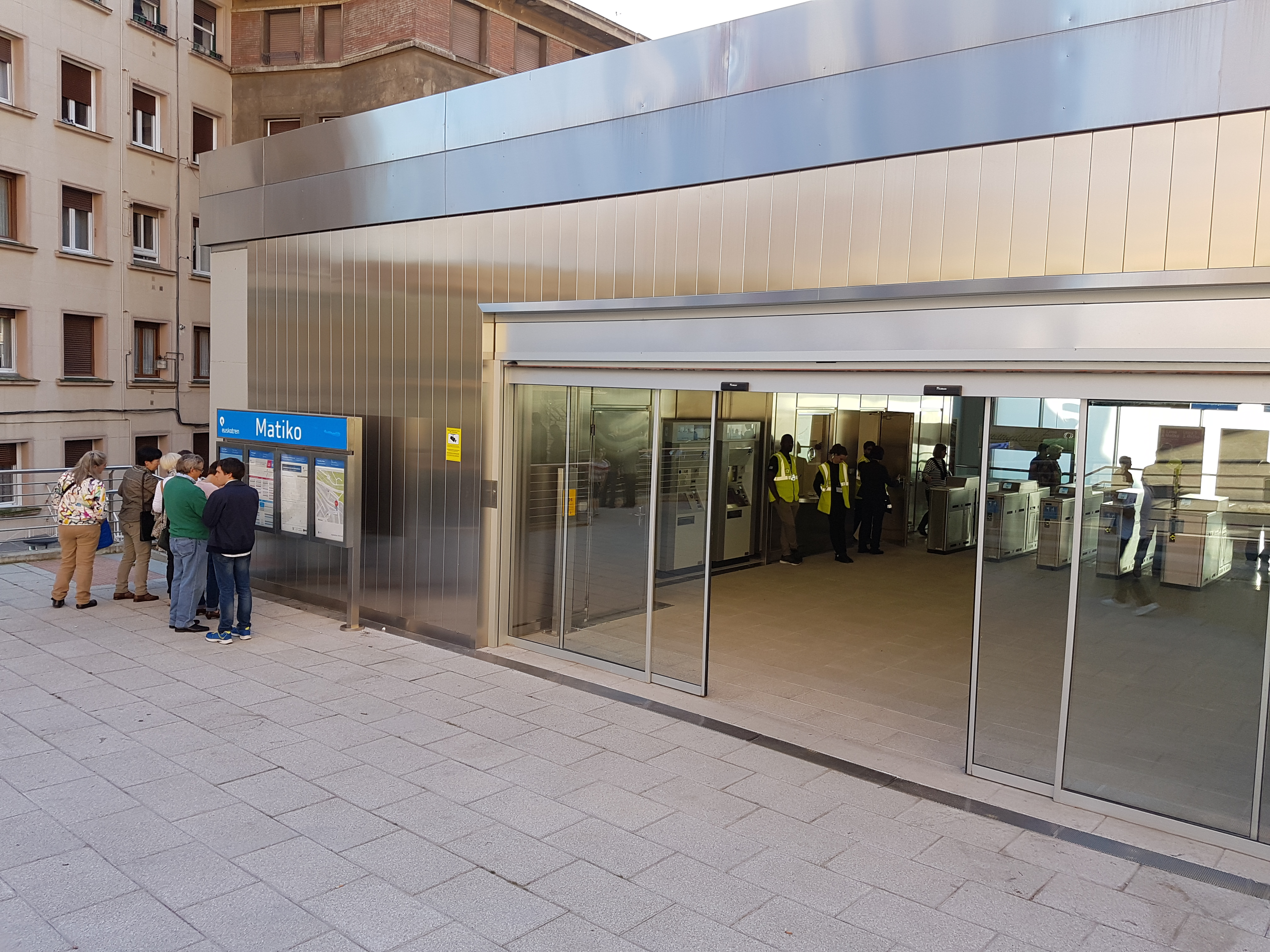
Station entrance

The new underground Matiko station opened on 8 April 2017, integrated into the Bilbao Metro's Line 3, which is operated by Euskotren Trena.

=== Future ===
The station will be the southern terminus of a new line connecting the city centre with the Bilbao Airport. The new line will use the existing tunnel through Mount Artxanda and will be operated by Euskotren Trena. Studies are underway for the Bilbao Metro's Line 4, which is planned to also begin at Matiko station and will connect with Bilbao's southern neighbourhoods in the Errekalde district.

== Station layout ==
Matiko is a partially underground station, built on the site of a former railway trench in the district of Uribarri in Bilbao.

=== Entrances ===
- 30 Tiboli St.
- 21 Tiboli St.

== Services ==
Unlike the two other lines of the Bilbao Metro system (which are operated by Metro Bilbao, S.A.), Line 3 is operated by Euskotren, which runs it as part of the Euskotren Trena network. Trains from the Bilbao–San Sebastián, Txorierri and Urdaibai lines of the network run through Line 3.

Preceding station	Euskotren Trena	Following station
Terminus	Line 3	Uribarri towards Kukullaga
Terminus	Line E1	Uribarri towards Pasaia
Ola towards Lezama	Line E3	Uribarri towards Kukullaga
Terminus	Line E4	Uribarri towards Bermeo
