= Kurtzea station =

Railway station in Lezama, Basque Country, Spain

Kurtzea

General information
- Location: Lezama, Biscay; Spain
- Coordinates: 43°16′36″N 2°50′47″W
- Owner: Euskal Trenbide Sarea
- Operator: Euskotren
- Line: Line E3
- Platforms: 2 side platforms
- Tracks: 2

Construction
- Structure type: At-grade
- Parking: Yes
- Accessible: Yes

Other information
- Fare zone: Zone 2

History
- Opened: 2 May 1894

Services
Preceding station	Euskotren Trena	Following station
Lezama Terminus	Line E3	Zamudio towards Kukullaga
Location

Kurtzea is a railway station in Lezama, Basque Country, Spain. It is owned by Euskal Trenbide Sarea and operated by Euskotren. It lies on the Txorierri line.

== History ==
The station was opened together with the Txorierri line in 1894. It was the terminus of the line until 1994, when the line was extended by one station to bring the railway closer to the main population center.

The station was renovated in 2018 after trains on the Txorierri line started running through metro Line 3.

== Services ==
The station is served by Euskotren Trena line E3. It runs every 15 minutes (in each direction) during weekdays, and every 30 minutes during weekends.
