= Line 3 (Bilbao Metro) =

Hybrid commuter rail and rapid transit line in Biscay, Basque Country, Spain

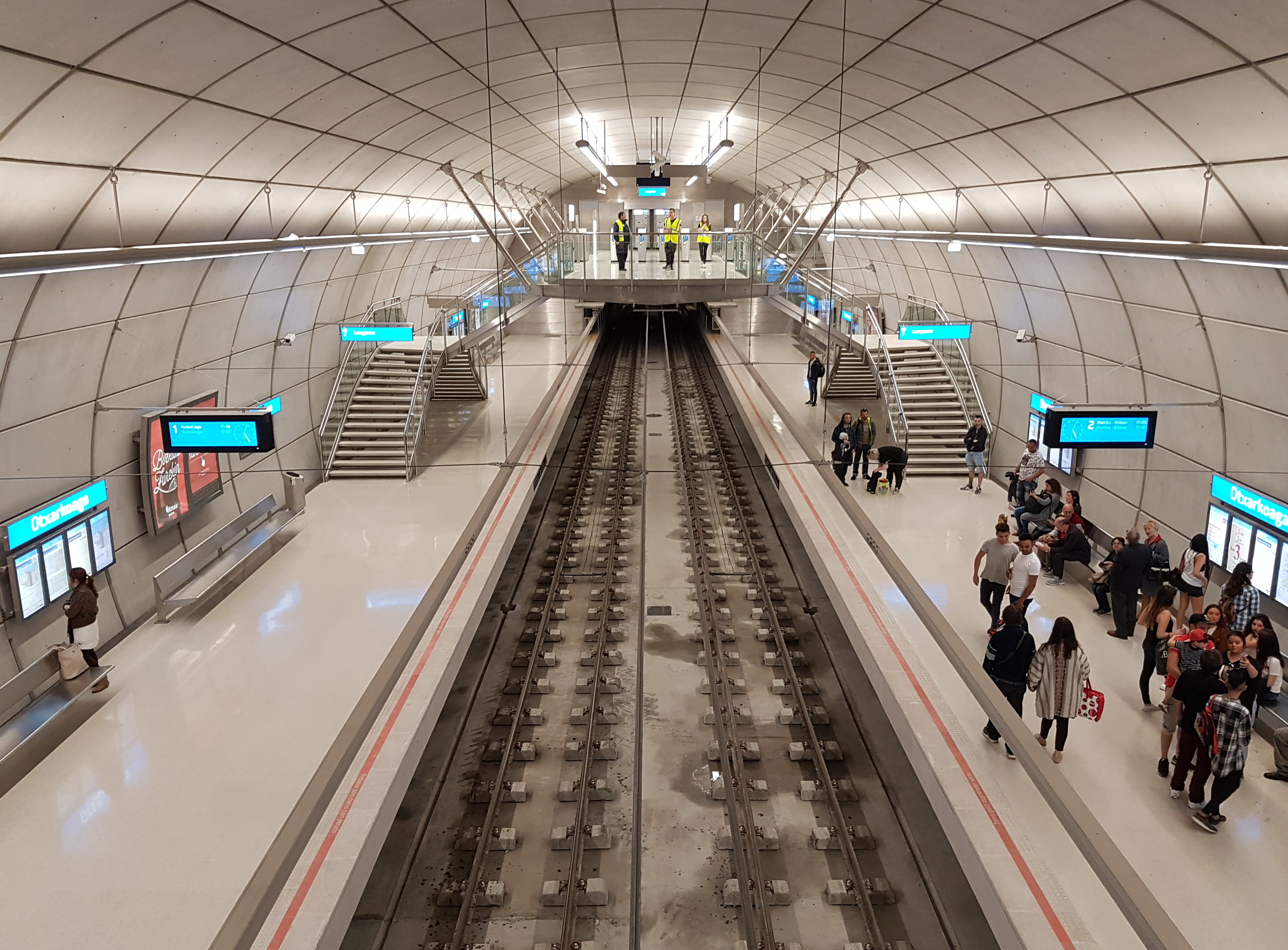
- Otxarkoaga station in 2017

Overview
- Owner: Euskal Trenbide Sarea
- Locale: Etxebarri, Bilbao (Basque Country, Spain)
- Termini: Matiko; Kukullaga
- Stations: 7

Service
- Type: Rapid transit/Commuter rail
- System: Euskotren Trena, Bilbao Metro
- Operator: Euskotren
- Rolling stock: Euskotren 900, 950 series

History
- Opened: 8 April 2017; 9 years ago

Technical
- Line length: 5.9 km (3.7 mi)
- Track gauge: 1,000 mm (3 ft 3 3/8 in) metre gauge
- Electrification: 1,500 V DC overhead catenary
Route map

Line 3 of the Bilbao Metro is a hybrid commuter rail and rapid transit line in Biscay, Basque Country, Spain. It is 5.9 km (3.7 mi) long and connects Etxebarri and the Uribarri and Otxarkoaga-Txurdinaga districts in Bilbao with the city center.

Unlike the two other lines of the system (which are operated by Metro Bilbao), Line 3 is operated by Euskotren, which runs it as part of the Euskotren Trena network. Trains from the Bilbao–San Sebastián, Txorierri, and Urdaibai lines of the network run through Line 3.

== Operations ==
Trains on Line 3 run every 7.5 minutes on weekdays, and every 10 minutes on weekends. As the line is part of the wider Euskotren Trena commuter/interurban railway network, most trains on the line continue beyond the termini of Matiko and Kukullaga. Operationally, Line 3 trains are Bilbao–San Sebastián, Txorierri, and Urdaibai line trains that run along a shared trunk between the termini, providing metro-standard frequencies, just like S-Bahn systems originating in German-speaking countries. The corridor is thus branded as a Metro line to reflect this.

== Station list ==
Station	Transfers	Location		Opening date
↑ Through-service to/from Lezama via the Txorierri line ↑
Matiko		Uribarri	Bilbao	8 April 2017
Uribarri		Uribarri	Bilbao	8 April 2017
Zazpikaleak/Casco Viejo	Line 1; Line 2; Bilbao tram	Ibaiondo	Bilbao	8 April 2017
Zurbaranbarri		Uribarri	Bilbao	8 April 2017
Txurdinaga		Otxarkoaga-Txurdinaga	Bilbao	8 April 2017
Otxarkoaga		Otxarkoaga-Txurdinaga	Bilbao	8 April 2017
Kukullaga		Etxebarri		8 April 2017
↓ Through-service to/from Zaldibar, Elgoibar or Amara via the Bilbao–San Sebastián line ↓
↓ Through-service to/from Gernika or Bermeo via the Urdaibai line ↓

== Rolling stock ==
The line shares rolling stock with the rest of the Euskotren Trena network. Currently, 900 and 950 series trains are used.
