= Otxarkoaga-Txurdinaga =

Coordinates: 43°15′30″N 2°54′10″W

- District
- Otxarkoaga-Txurdinaga district is highlighted in blue in this map of the districts of Bilbao.
- Interactive map of Otxarkoaga-Txurdinaga
- Country: Spain
- Autonomous community: Basque Country
- Province: Biscay
- Comarca: Greater Bilbao
- Municipality: Bilbao

Area
  - Total: 3.90 km^{2} (1.51 sq mi)

Population (2016)
  - Total: 26,458
  - Density: 6,780/km^{2} (17,600/sq mi)

Otxarkoaga-Txurdinaga is the third district of the city of Bilbao (Biscay), in the Spanish Basque Country. It is divided into the neighbourhoods of Otxarkoaga and Txurdinaga. It has an area of 389.94 hectares and a population of 26,458 inhabitants (2016), being one of the least densely populated districts of the city.

== History ==
These two neighbourhoods were historically part of the old parish of Begoña. In these areas existed vineyards for the elaboration of the traditional Txakoli white wine, this has given the inhabitants the nickname of Matxorris, from Basque language Mahats=grape and orri=plant.

The Basque Football Federation has its offices in the area, on Julian Gaiarre Etorbidea.

== Transport ==
The Bilbobus and BizkaiBus bus lines have stops in the district. In 2017, Line 3 of the Bilbao Metro opened, with the Otxarkoaga and Txurdinaga stations in the district.

== Sights ==
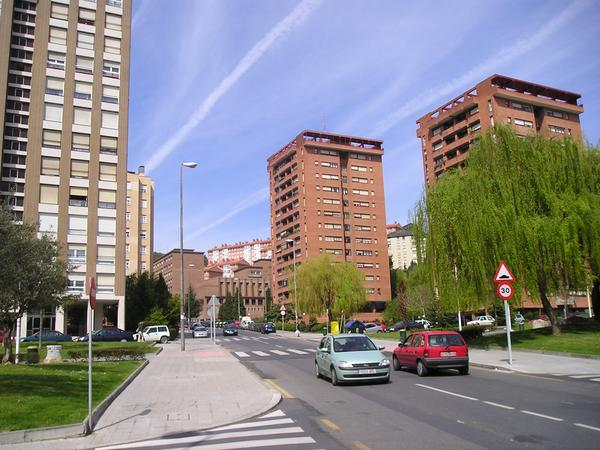
Gabriel Aresti avenue in Txurdinaga.
