= Txorierri line =

Railway in the Basque Country, Spain

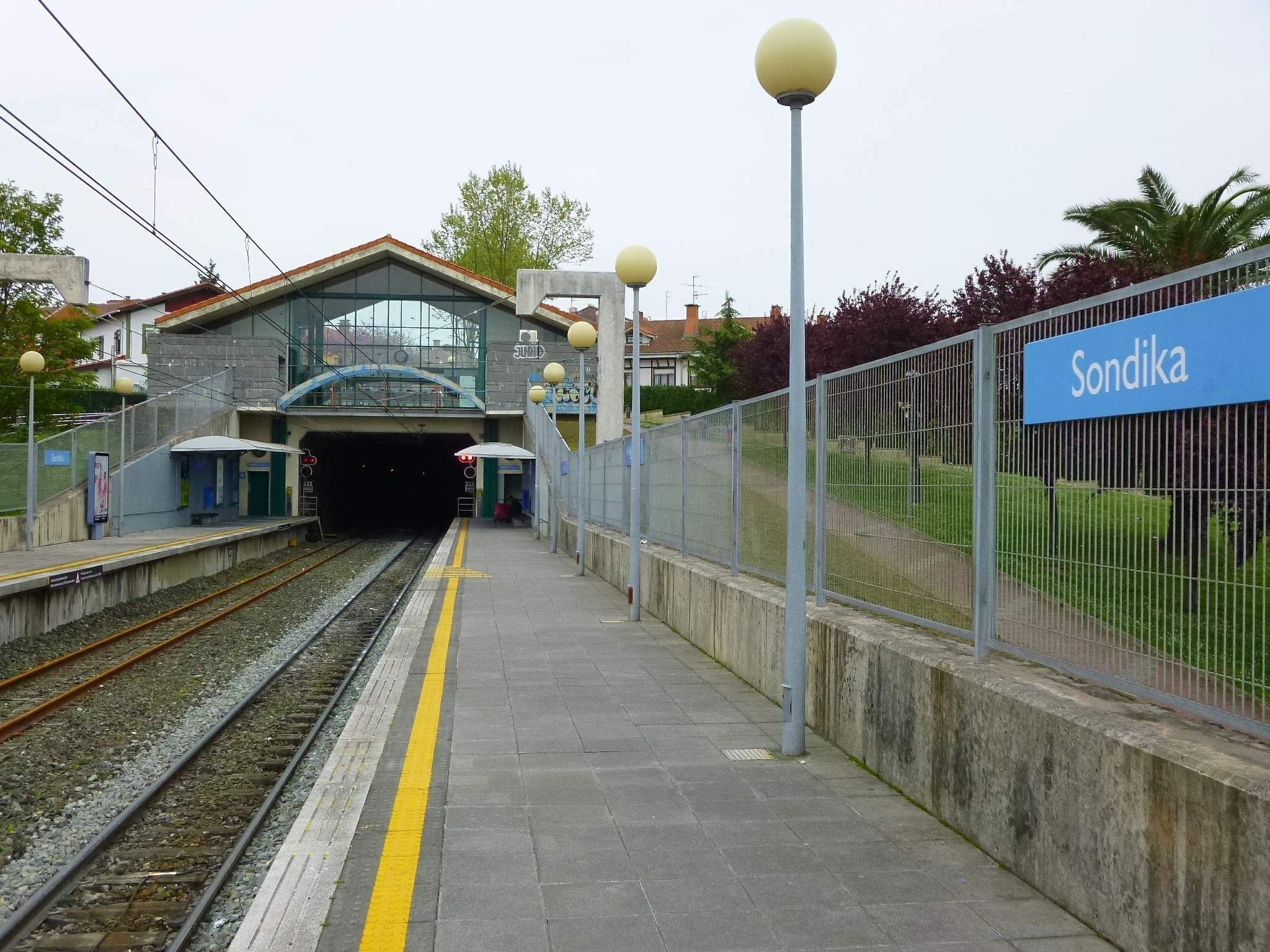
- View of Sondika station

Overview
- Status: Active
- Owner: Euskal Trenbide Sarea
- Locale: Biscay, Basque Country, Spain
- Termini: Matiko; Lezama
- Stations: 10

History
- Opened: 2 May 1894

Technical
- Track gauge: 1,000 mm (3 ft 3 3/8 in)
- Electrification: 1,500 V DC overhead catenary
- Signalling: LZB

The Txorierri line (Basque: Txorierriko linea, Spanish: Línea del Txorierri), also known as the Bilbao–Lezama railway (Basque: Bilbo-Lezama trenbidea, Spanish: Ferrocarril Bilbao-Lezama) is a narrow-gauge railway in Biscay, Basque Country, Spain. Owned by Euskal Trenbide Sarea, it runs from Lezama to Matiko, from where it continues as Line 3 of the Bilbao Metro.

== History ==
=== Early years ===
In February 1891, the government granted Juan de Urrutia y Burriel the concession for a railway between Bilbao and Lezama, for which proposals had been made since 1886. In order to cross Mount Artxanda, a short 445 m (1,460 ft) tunnel was built, which required a sinuous and steep alignment on both sides of the mountain. Two days after the completion of the Artxanda tunnel, the Bilbao City Council opened a competition for a new municipal cemetery. The backers of the railway bought a plot of land near Derio and handed it over for free to the city council, in order to create a source of traffic for the line. The proposal was accepted and the Bilbao Municipal Cemetery was built on that site. The Bilbao–Lezama Railway Company (Spanish: Compañía del Ferrocarril de Bilbao a Lezama) was founded in May 1893. The line opened partially between Begoña and Lezama (currently known as Kurtzea) on 2 May 1894 due to delays in the construction of a tunnel and the Bilbao-Calzadas terminus. Two months after the opening of the line, on 7 July, a train descending from Artxanda towards Begoña derailed, killing 13 people. Despite this, works on the line continued and the Bilbao-Calzadas station opened in March 1895.

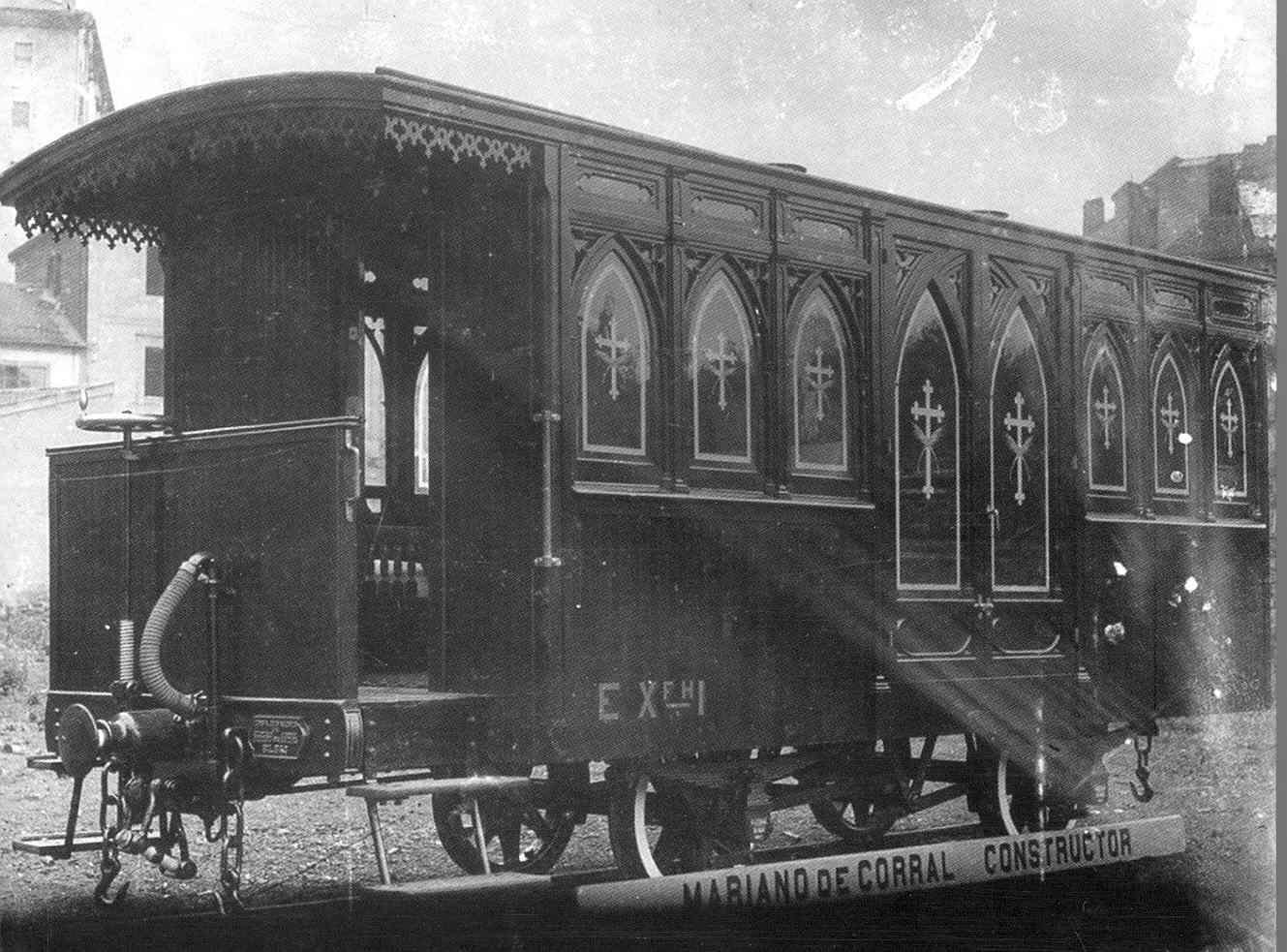
A first-class funeral car used on the line.

The new graveyard in Derio didn't open until 1902. This, coupled with the low population density of the area served by the line, resulted in a very low demand that threatened the viability of the railway. The only remaining locomotive was destroyed by an explosion in October 1902, which brought operations to a halt. However, instead of closing the line, the company decided to build a new alignment from Bilbao to Derio through Mount Artxanda which would shorten travel times and improve the overall service. The new alignment featured a 1,350 m (4,430 ft) tunnel through Artxanda, and was significantly less steep than the original one. The government authorized the construction, and the new line opened on 31 October 1908. Together with the reopening of the line, the railway started offering a new funeral train service to Derio. This service operated until some years after the Spanish Civil War. A short branch line to Sondika opened on 23 June 1909, thus connecting the line to the Lutxana–Mungia railway. The old alignment between Bilbao-Calzadas and Begoña was converted into an electric tramway in 1912, which operated until its closure in 1955.

=== FTS and Euskotren ===
The line was never economically profitable, and in 1947 it was merged into Ferrocarriles y Transportes Suburbanos. The new operator decided to modernize it, with the electrification of the Bilbao–Lezama line entering service in March 1950. The new electrification overloaded the Lutxana substation (which also powered the Lutxana–Mungia line), so in 1951 a new substation opened in Berreteaga. The line still struggled financially, and the collapse of a tunnel in Bilbao in 1969 resulted in the closure of the line between Bilbao-Calzadas and Ciudad Jardín, which became the new southern terminus of the line. FTS ceased operations in 1977, and its services were provisionally taken over by FEVE before being transferred to Basque Railways in 1982. Bilbao-Calzadas reopened in November 1986. The new Sondika station opened in 1992, and the line was extended eastwards to its present-day terminus in 1994.

The Bilbao-Calzadas station was located next to Bilbao-Aduana (also known as Zazpikaleak), the terminus of the Bilbao–Plentzia railway. Most of that line was converted into Line 1 of the Bilbao Metro in 1995, leaving the short section from Zazpikaleak to San Ignazio isolated from the rest of the Euskotren network. Thus, a 175 m (574 ft) tunnel was built between the two termini, connecting the San Ignazio–Zazpikaleak section to the Bilbao–Lezama line. The link opened in October 1996, and resulted in the closure of Bilbao-Calzadas. In September that year, Zumalakerregi opened as an infill between Zazpikaleak and Matiko. Loruri-Ciudad Jardín closed in 1996 due to its close proximity to Matiko. The Deustu–San Ignazio stretch closed in April 2000 due to the construction of a new road access to Bilbao.

=== Current developments ===
Due to the construction of Line 3 of the metro, the section between Zazpikaleak and Deustu closed in 2010. At the same time, Loruri-Ciudad Jardín reopened due to the closure of nearby Matiko station. In June 2015, Zazpikaleak closed for its conversion into a metro station. Trains on the Txorierri line were redirected into the Lutxana–Sondika line in order to provide a connection with Line 1 of the metro. At the same time, a shuttle service started running from Sondika to Loruri. The conversion of the single-track Artxanda tunnel into an evacuation tunnel for the new double-track Artxanda tunnel resulted in the definitive closure of Loruri in November 2015. The shuttle reopened in December between Sondika and Ola.

Line 3 opened on 8 April 2017. Since its opening, the Txorierri line has been connected to it. From Matiko, the metro infrastructure continues through the new tunnel under Artxanda before reaching Ola. Works to upgrade the stations on the Txorierri line started in 2018. A new double-track alignment between Ola and Sondika is in the planning stages, it would remove the need to reverse at Sondika before continuing to Bilbao or Lezama. This new stretch will be future-proofed for an extension to the airport. The extension to the airport would branch off the Txorierri line east of the new Sondika station, reaching the terminal through a 2.5 km (1.6 mi) tunnel under the runways.

== Service ==
E3 line

Overview
- Service type: Commuter rail
- Current operator: Euskotren
- Ridership: 1,721,890 (2022)

Route
- Termini: Lezama; Kukullaga
- Lines used: Txorierri; Line 3 (Bilbao Metro)

The only service operating on the Txorierri line is Euskotren Trena line E3. Operated by Euskotren, it runs from Lezama to Kukullaga via central Bilbao. There are four trains per hour on weekdays, service frequency is reduced to two trains per hour on weekends.

From Kukullaga to Matiko, E3 services run on Line 3 of the metro. Then, they continue through the Artxanda tunnel to Ola and Sondika, where they reverse before continuing to Lezama. There is an interchange with the other two lines of the metro at Zazpikaleak/Casco Viejo. Trains of the 950 series entered service on this line in 2016.
