= Mount Artxanda =

Mountain in Spain

- Artxanda Mendia; Monte Archanda
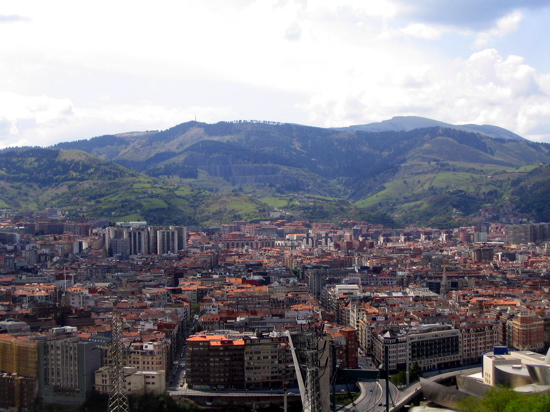
- View of Bilbao from Artxanda

Highest point
- Elevation: 251 m (823 ft)
- Coordinates: 43°16′28″N 2°55′04″W

Geography
- Location within Spain

Mount Artxanda (Basque: Artxanda mendia; Spanish: Monte Archanda) is one of the two small mountain ranges that delimit the municipality of Bilbao, the other one being Pagasarri. Of the two, it is the lower one (at no more than 300 m.), the closer one to the center of the city, and the one that has suffered from more intense urbanization. The pass of Santo Domingo separates the main part of Artxanda from Monte Avril, 400m high.

The Artxanda Funicular links downtown Bilbao with a recreational area at the top of the mountain, which has a park, several restaurants, a hotel, and a sports complex. The area is quite popular among the city's inhabitants and offers panoramic views of the city to the tourists.

Panorama of Bilbao from Artxanda
