= Uribarri =

Coordinates: 43.2678°N 2.92306°W

- District
- Uribarri district is highlighted in blue in this map of the districts of Bilbao.
- Interactive map of Uribarri
- Country: Spain
- Autonomous community: Basque Country
- Province: Biscay
- Comarca: Greater Bilbao
- Municipality: Bilbao

Area
  - Total: 4.19 km^{2} (1.62 sq mi)

Population (2016)
  - Total: 36,181
  - Density: 8,640/km^{2} (22,400/sq mi)

Uribarri is the second district of the city of Bilbao (Biscay), in the Spanish Basque Country. It is divided into the neighbourhoods of Castaños, Matico-Ciudad Jardín, Uríbarri proper and Zurbaran-Arabella.

It has an area of 4.19 square kilometers and a population of 36,181 inhabitants.

== History ==
For many years it was a rural area full of farms, belonging to the former parish of Begoña, as a result many street names in the district are former names of farms, like Trauko.

This district includes the quarter of La Salve, of historical importance for Bilbao as it was a traditional point for sailors returning to the city.

The area close to the Estuary of Bilbao was urbanized in the late 19th century, when the Paseo del Campo Volantin boulevard was created, lined with mansions of Bilbao's bourgeoisie. The higher lands away from the estuary were urbanized in the 1960s, with high density buildings for working classes.

== Places of interest ==
- Bilbao City Hall
- Zubizuri bridge
- Mount Artxanda
- Artxanda Funicular

== Sights ==
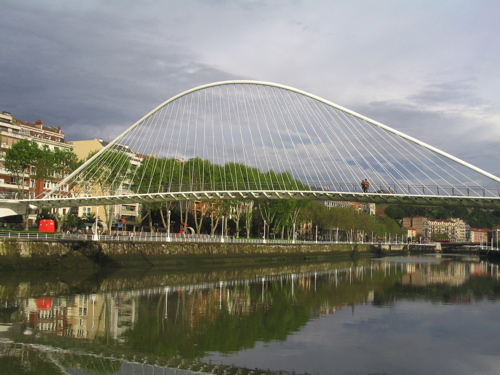
Campo Volantin boulevard and Zubizuri.
