= Etxebarri =

- town and municipality
- Etxebarriko Doneztebe Elizatea
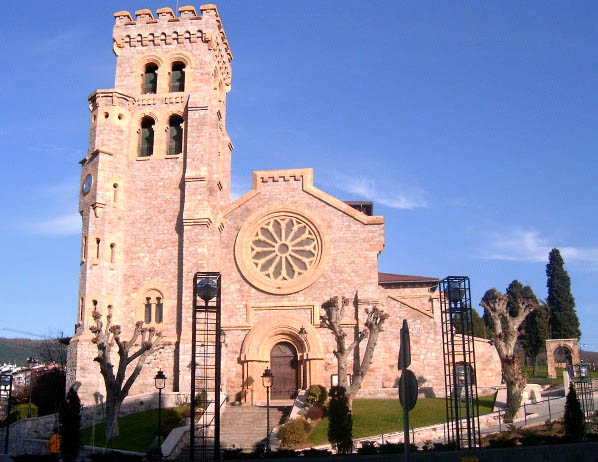
- Doneztebeko Eleiza (The Church of Saint Stephen)

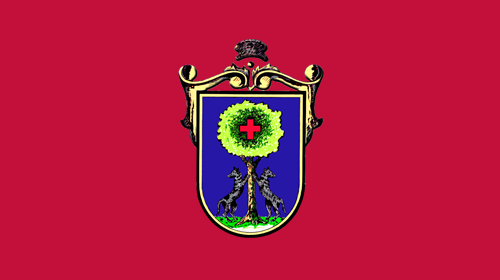
- Flag Coat of arms
- Nicknames: Etxebarri, Sanan, La Avenida, Abenida, Doneztebe, San Esteban, Etxebarriko Elizatea, San Antonio
- Motto(s): «Zelai urdinean, berde koloreko haritza, berdez jantzita eta otso bi enbor ondoan zutik eta bere kopan gurutze gorri bat»
- Location of Etxebarri within the Basque Country
- Coordinates: 43°14′50″N 2°53′30″W
- Country: Spain
- Autonomous community: Basque Country
- Independence from Galdakao: 1509

Government
  - Type: Alkatea
  - Body: Etxebarriko Udaletxea
  - Alkatea: Loren Oliva (La Voz del Pueblo (LVP))

Area
  - Total: 3.26 km^{2} (1.26 sq mi)
- Elevation: 35 m (115 ft)

Population (2025-01-01)
  - Total: 12,038
- Demonyms: Etxebarritarrak; etxebarritar; etxebarrian
- Time zone: UTC+1 (CET)
  - Summer (DST): UTC+2 (CEST)
- Postal code: 48450
- Area code: 34 (Spain) + 94 (Bizkaia Province)
- Website: www.etxebarri.eus

Etxebarri (Spanish: Echévarri) is a town and municipality located in the province of Biscay, in the Autonomous Basque Community, in the North of Spain.

The town and municipality got the present name on 13 January 2005, officially changing the previous name "Etxebarri, Doneztebeko Elizatea" (Spanish: Echévarri, Anteiglesia de San Esteban) for the sake of simplification. It translates as "new home/house" (etxe "home", barri "new"). Prior to the introduction of Standard Basque, the town's name was spelled Echevarri.

Etxebarri has an area of 33.38 square kilometres and a population of 11,563 (2019), with a density of 346 inhabitants/km^{2}.

Being so close to Bilbao (1.5 kilometres) has had a direct effect on Etxebarri. Until a few decades ago, Etxebarri was a small nucleus in which its rural population worked in industrial areas. Both the population and the industrial land increased considerably because of the congestion of Bilbao and the need for space for the installation of industries. Therefore, there was a significant increase in new population in the locality. In addition, since 2004, the Metro Bilbao underground train has reached Etxebarri. In fact, the threshold stipulated for the town in 2012 is about 10,000 inhabitants. It has a metro station of the Bilbao Metro rapid transit service and a train station of the commuter rail service Euskotren Trena.
