= Kukullaga station =

Railway station in Etxebarri, Basque Country, Spain

Kukullaga
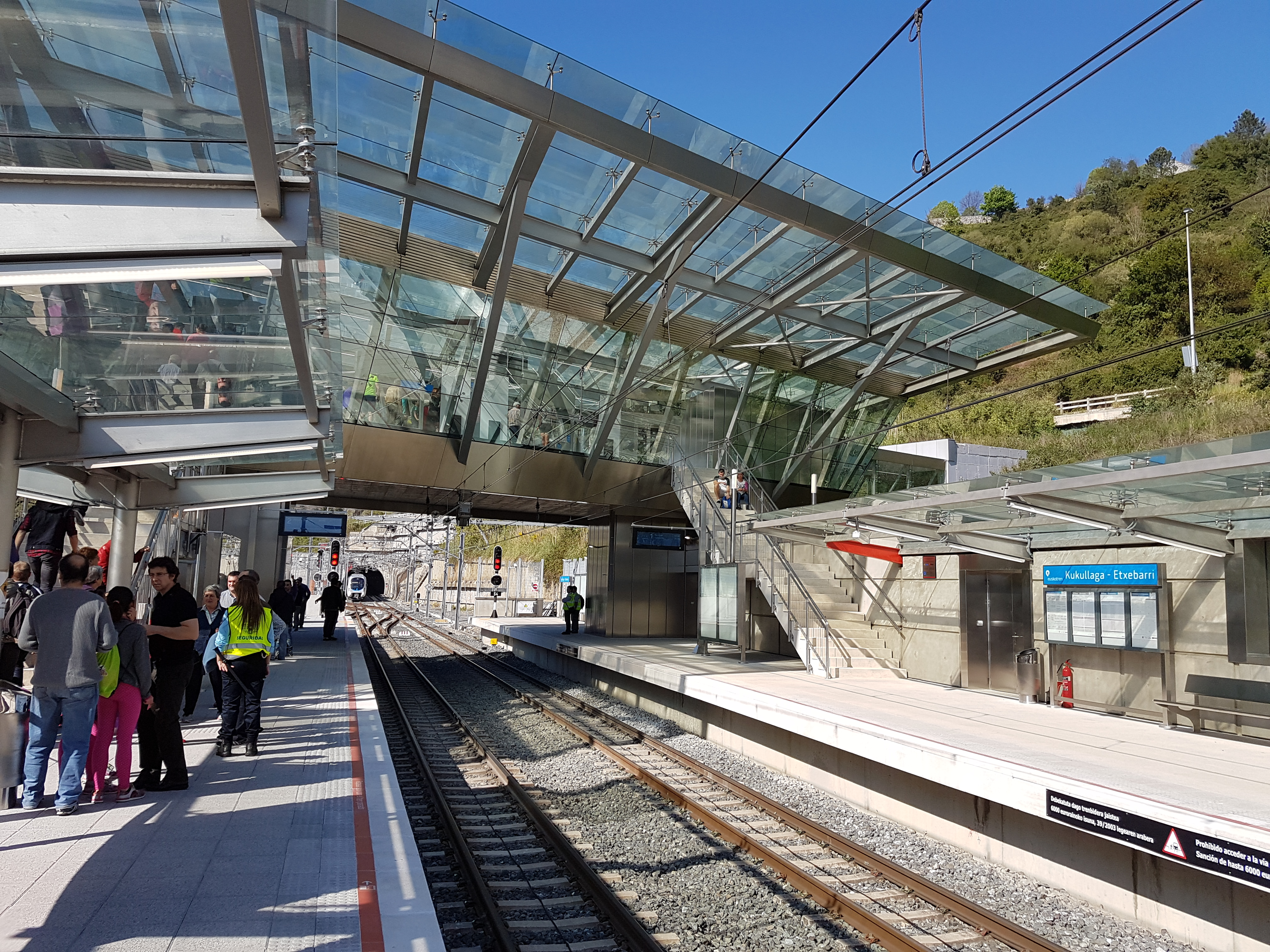
- View from the central platform

General information
- Location: 33 Bernar Etxepare St. 48450 Etxebarri; Spain
- Coordinates: 43°15′06″N 2°53′23″W
- Owner: Euskal Trenbide Sarea
- Lines: Line 3; Line E1; Line E3; Line E4
- Platforms: 1 side platform and 1 island platform
- Tracks: 3

Construction
- Structure type: At-grade
- Platform levels: 1
- Parking: No
- Accessible: Yes

Other information
- Fare zone: Zone 2

History
- Opened: 8 April 2017
Location

Kukullaga is a station on Line 3 of the Bilbao Metro and Euskotren Trena commuter and regional rail services. The station is the southern terminus of metro Line 3. The station is located in the neighborhood of Kukullaga, in the municipality of Etxebarri, which is part of the Bilbao metropolitan area. It is one of two metro stations in Etxebarri, the other one being Etxebarri. It opened on 8 April 2017.

During the planning and construction process, the station was referred to as Etxebarri-Norte and San Antonio-Etxebarri.

== Station layout ==
Kukullaga is an open-air station located at-grade in a neighbourhood with the same name, part of the municipality of Etxebarri. The station was designed by British architect Norman Foster. The station can be accessed from the western side, facing Ametzola Park or from the eastern side using an inclined elevator that connects the station with the neighborhood of San Antonio, which is located at a higher altitude.

The station is composed of a crystal footbridge connecting the entrances with the platforms. There has been criticism over the crystal bridge getting too hot during sunny days.

=== Access ===
- Ametzola Park
- 29 Euskal Herria St. (Bº Kukullaga)
- 4, Church access (Bº San Antonio)

== Services ==
Unlike the two other lines of the Bilbao Metro system (which are operated by Metro Bilbao, S.A.), Line 3 is operated by Euskotren, which runs it as part of the Euskotren Trena network. Trains from the Bilbao–San Sebastián, Txorierri and Urdaibai lines of the network run through Line 3.

After the closure of the railtrack section between Kukullaga and Bilbao-Atxuri, the corridor between the neighborhood of Atxuri and the Kukullaga station will be served by an extension of the Bilbao tram, which will include the adaptation of Bilbao-Atxuri, Bolueta and Kukullaga stations to include platforms and tracks adapted to a tramway service. The tramway extension to Bolueta opened in March 2022, but the tram won't reach Kukullaga until a new depot for Euskotren's material is built, since the tracks the tram would use have been adapted as a temporary depot.

Preceding station	Euskotren Trena	Following station
Otxarkoaga towards Matiko	Line 3	Terminus
Otxarkoaga towards Matiko	Line E1	Etxebarri towards Pasaia
Otxarkoaga towards Lezama	Line E3	Terminus
Otxarkoaga towards Matiko	Line E4	Etxebarri towards Bermeo

== Gallery ==
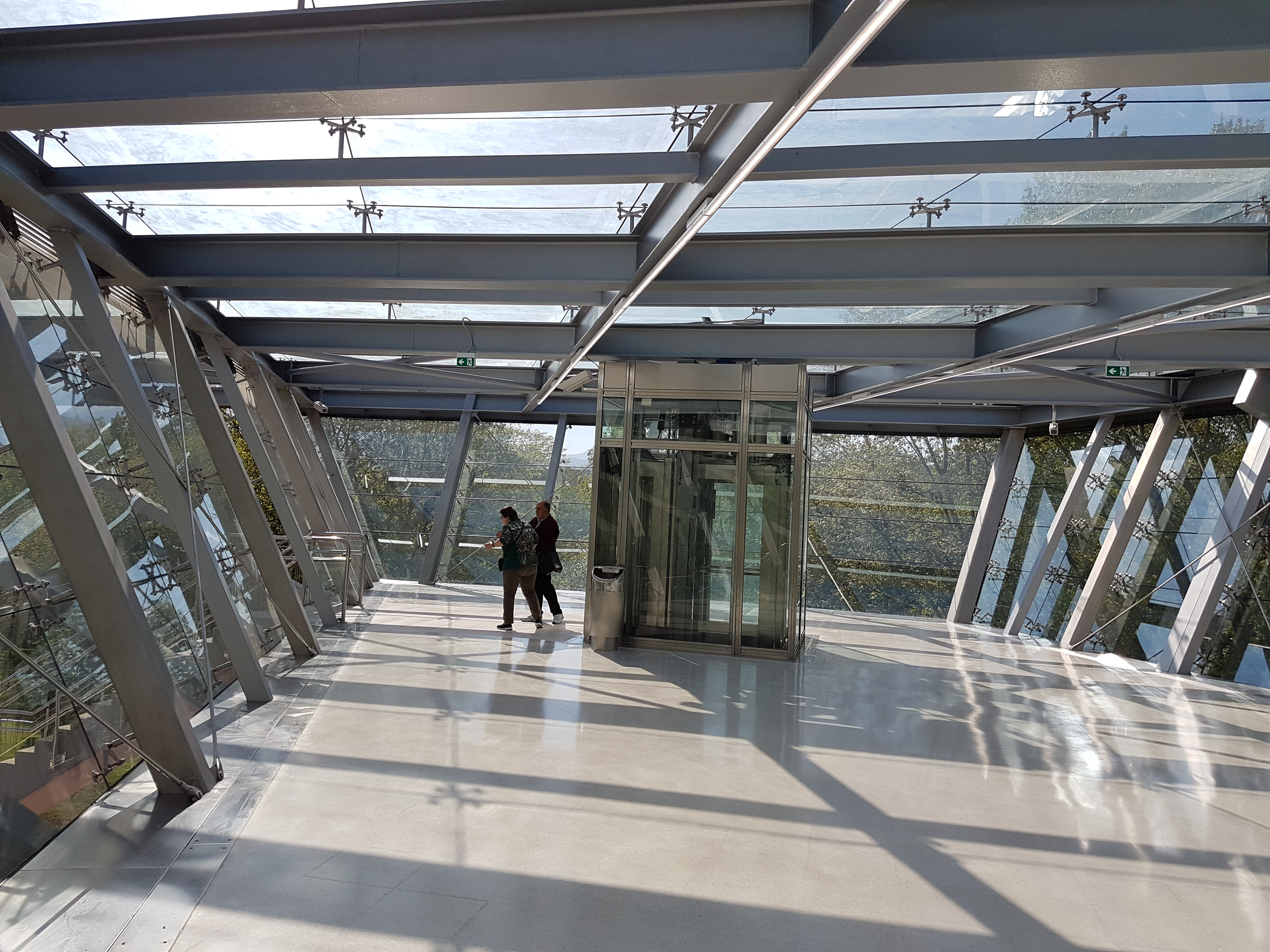
Footbridge connecting the platforms
