= Lezama station =

Railway station in Lezama, Basque Country, Spain

Lezama
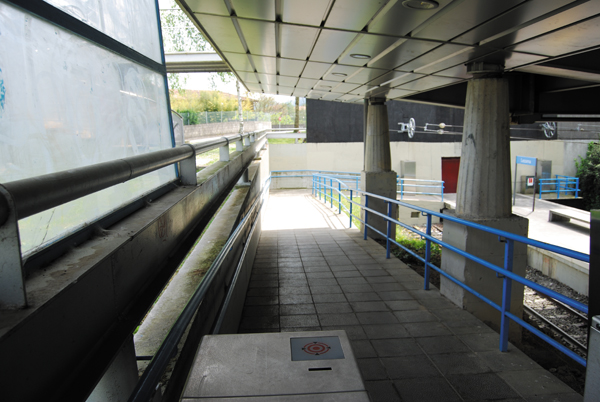
- Entrance to the station before the 2018 renovation

General information
- Location: Lezama, Biscay; Spain
- Coordinates: 43°16′24″N 2°50′09″W
- Owner: Euskal Trenbide Sarea
- Operator: Euskotren
- Line: Line E3
- Platforms: 1 island platform
- Tracks: 2

Construction
- Structure type: At-grade
- Parking: Yes
- Accessible: Yes

Other information
- Fare zone: Zone 2

History
- Opened: 28 September 1994

Services
Preceding station	Euskotren Trena	Following station
Terminus	Line E3	Kurtzea towards Kukullaga
Location

Lezama is a railway station in Lezama, Basque Country, Spain. It is owned by Euskal Trenbide Sarea and operated by Euskotren. It lies on the Txorierri line.

== History ==
The original terminus of the line was the nearby Kurtzea station (originally known as Lezama station), which was opened together with the Txorierri line in 1894. In 1994, the railway was extended and a new station was built closer to the population center of the town.

In October 2009, a 300 series train crashed into a buffer stop at the station, killing the driver and injuring several passengers.

The station was renovated in 2018 after trains on the Txorierri line started running through metro Line 3.

== Services ==
The station is served by Euskotren Trena line E3. It runs every 15 minutes (in each direction) during weekdays, and every 30 minutes during weekends.
