= Intxaurrondo station =

Railway station in San Sebastián, Basque Country, Spain

Intxaurrondo
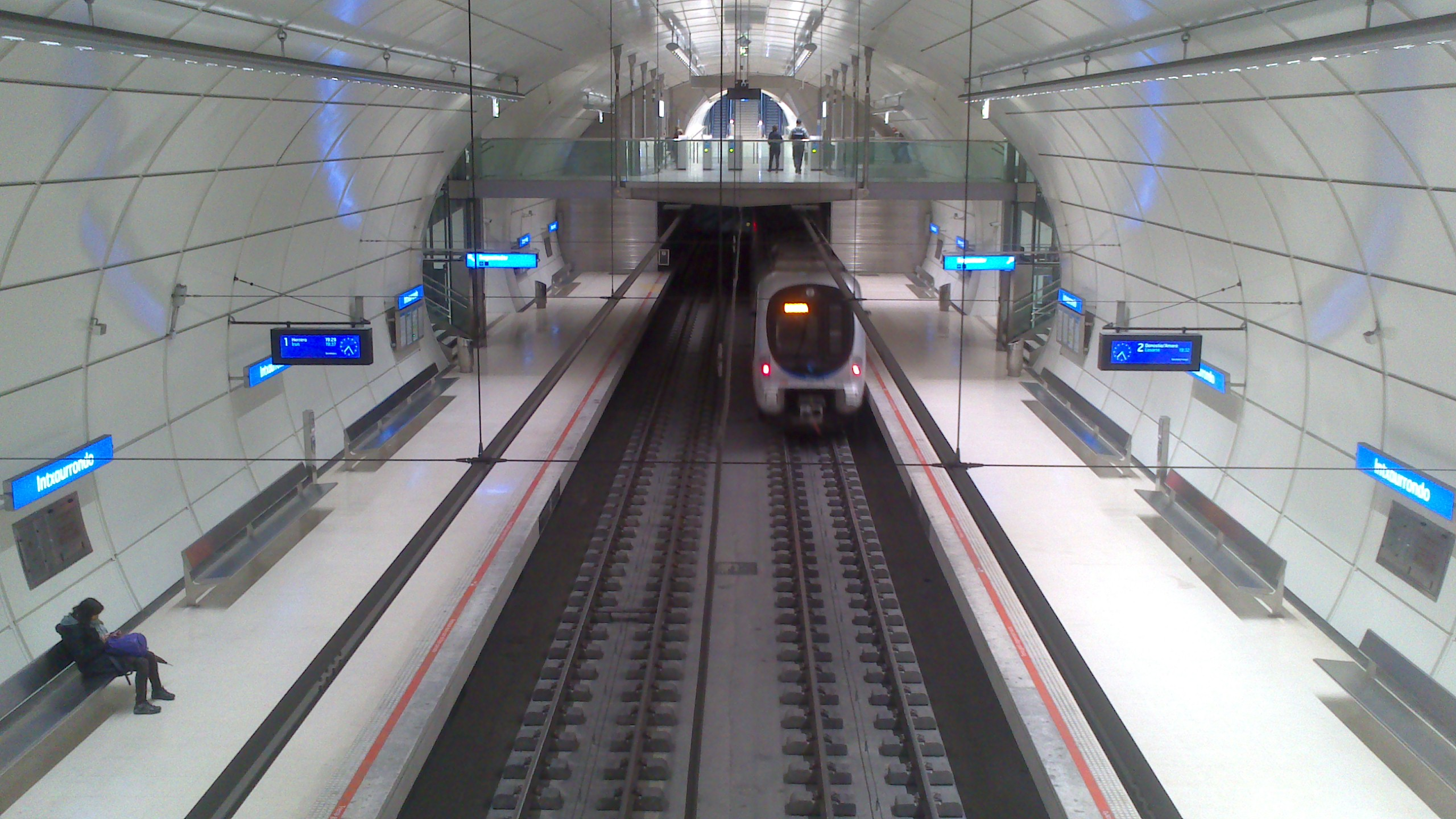
- View of the station from the mezzanine

General information
- Location: San Sebastián, Gipuzkoa; Spain
- Coordinates: 43°18′49″N 1°57′23″W
- Owner: Euskal Trenbide Sarea
- Operator: Euskotren
- Lines: Line E1; Line T1
- Platforms: 2 side platforms
- Tracks: 2

Construction
- Structure type: Underground
- Parking: No
- Accessible: Yes

History
- Opened: 4 October 2012

Services
Preceding station	Euskotren Trena	Following station
Loiola towards Matiko	Line E1	Herrera towards Pasaia
Loiola towards Lasarte-Oria	Line T1	Herrera towards Hendaia
Location

Intxaurrondo is a railway station in San Sebastián, Basque Country, Spain. It is owned by Euskal Trenbide Sarea and operated by Euskotren. It lies on the San Sebastián-Hendaye railway, popularly known as the Topo line. The Cercanías San Sebastián station of the same name serves the same area, but is unrelated to the Euskotren station.

== History ==
The current station is part of the new alignment between Loiola and Herrera that opened in October 2012. The original single-track tunnel was replaced by a new double-tracked one, and the underground Intxaurrondo station was built. The station is at a depth of 45 metres (148 ft), making it one of the deepest non-subway railway stations in Europe, and has the longest escalators in Spain.

== Services ==
The station is served by Euskotren Trena line E2. It runs every 7.5 minutes on weekdays and weekend afternoons, and every 15 minutes on weekend mornings.
