= Galtzaraborda station =

Railway station in Errenteria, Basque Country, Spain

Galtzaraborda
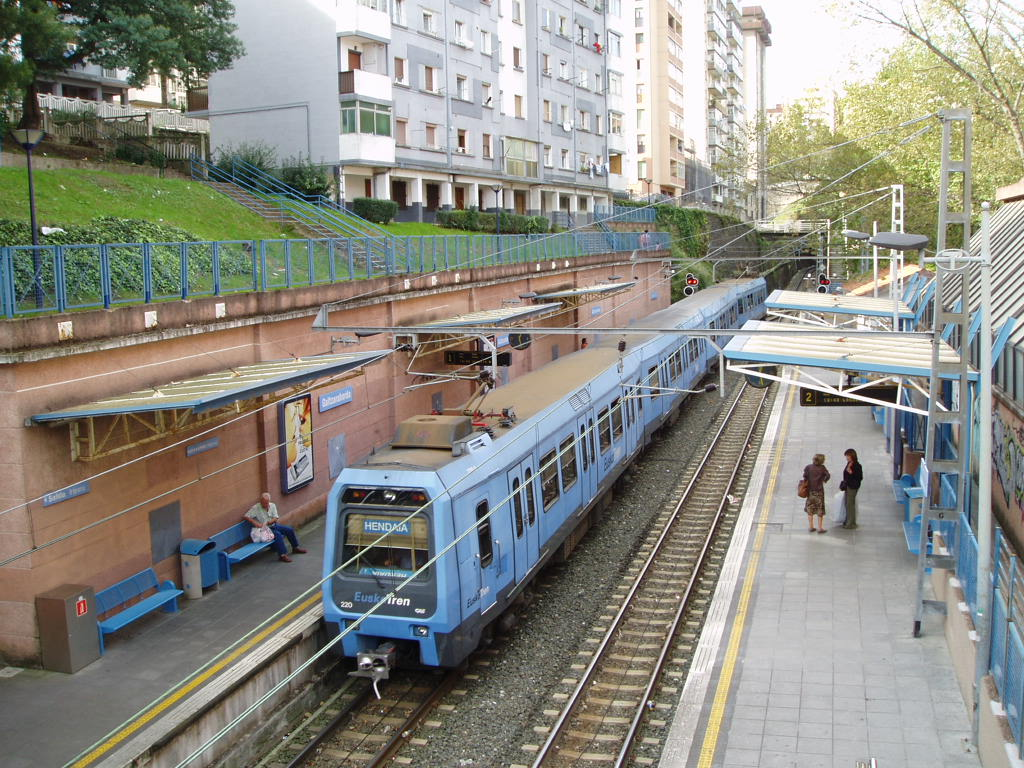
- A 200 series train entering the station

General information
- Location: Errenteria, Gipuzkoa; Spain
- Coordinates: 43°18′45″N 1°54′22″W
- Owner: Euskal Trenbide Sarea
- Operator: Euskotren
- Line: Line T1
- Platforms: 2 side platforms
- Tracks: 2

Construction
- Structure type: At-grade
- Parking: No
- Accessible: Yes

History
- Opened: 1992

Services
Preceding station	Euskotren Trena	Following station
Pasaia towards Lasarte-Oria	Line T1	Errenteria towards Hendaia
Location

Galtzaraborda is a railway station in Errenteria, Basque Country, Spain. It is owned by Euskal Trenbide Sarea and operated by Euskotren. It lies on the San Sebastián-Hendaye railway, popularly known as the Topo line.

== History ==
The station wasn't part of the line when it opened in 1912. It was built in 1992 as an infill station, at the same time as Belaskoenea and Anoeta on the same line.

As part of the new alignment of the line between Herrera and Galtzaraborda, the station will be put underground. Works started in early 2022 and their completion is scheduled for 2027.

== Services ==
The station is served by Euskotren Trena line E2. It runs every 15 minutes during weekdays and weekend afternoons, and every 30 minutes on weekend mornings.
