= Loiola station =

Railway station in San Sebastián, Basque Country, Spain

Loiola
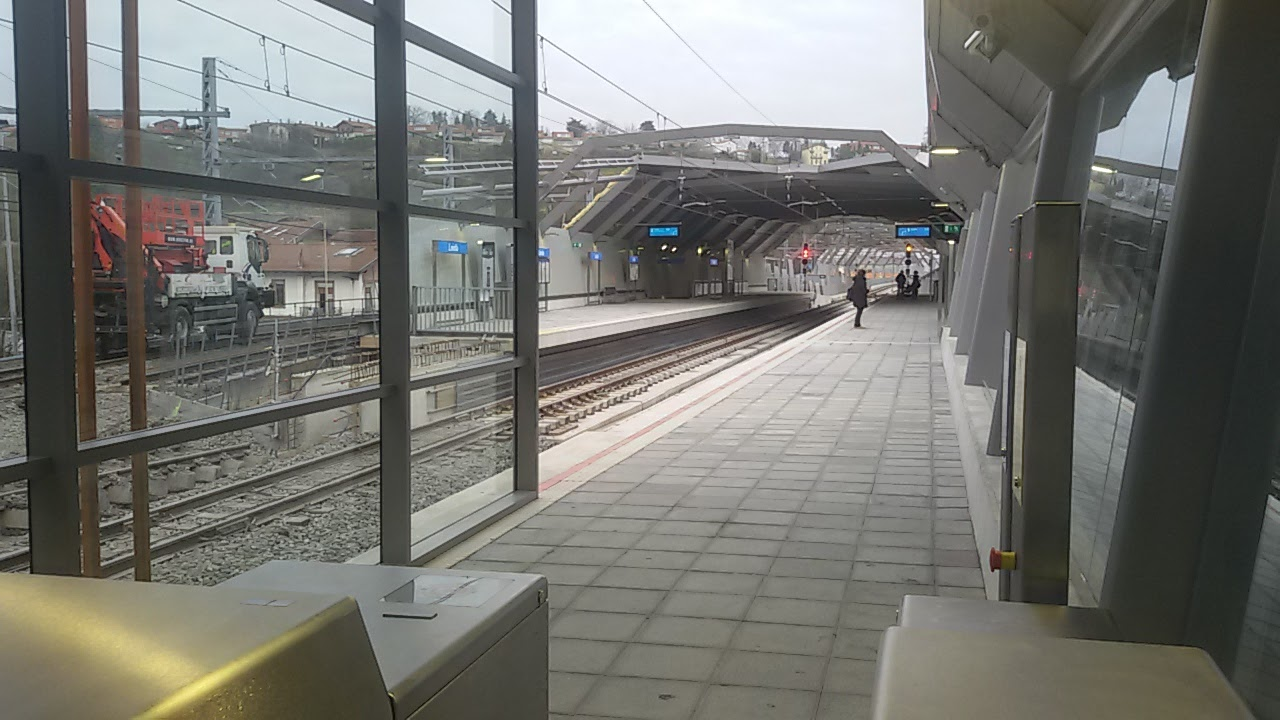
- View of the new station

General information
- Location: San Sebastián, Gipuzkoa; Spain
- Coordinates: 43°18′39″N 1°58′03″W
- Owner: Euskal Trenbide Sarea
- Operator: Euskotren
- Lines: Line E1; Line T1
- Platforms: 2 side platforms
- Tracks: 2

Construction
- Structure type: Elevated
- Parking: No
- Accessible: Yes

History
- Opened: 5 December 1912
- Rebuilt: 5 March 2017

Services
Preceding station	Euskotren Trena	Following station
Anoeta towards Matiko	Line E1	Intxaurrondo towards Pasaia
Anoeta towards Lasarte-Oria	Line T1	Intxaurrondo towards Hendaia
Location

Loiola is a railway station in San Sebastián, Basque Country, Spain. It is owned by Euskal Trenbide Sarea and operated by Euskotren. It lies on the San Sebastián-Hendaye railway, popularly known as the Topo line. The Cercanías San Sebastián station of the same name serves the same area, but is unrelated to the Euskotren station.

== History ==
The station opened in 1912 as part of the San Sebastián-Hendaye railway.

The works to rebuild the original station started in 2015. First, the old station was demolished to make place for the new one, while at the same time the line was diverted to a provisional station. The new station opened on 5 March 2017, and features improved accessibility.

== Services ==
The station is served by Euskotren Trena line E2. It runs every 7.5 minutes on weekdays and weekend afternoons, and every 15 minutes on weekend mornings.
