= Bentak station =

Railway station in Irun, Basque Country, Spain

Bentak
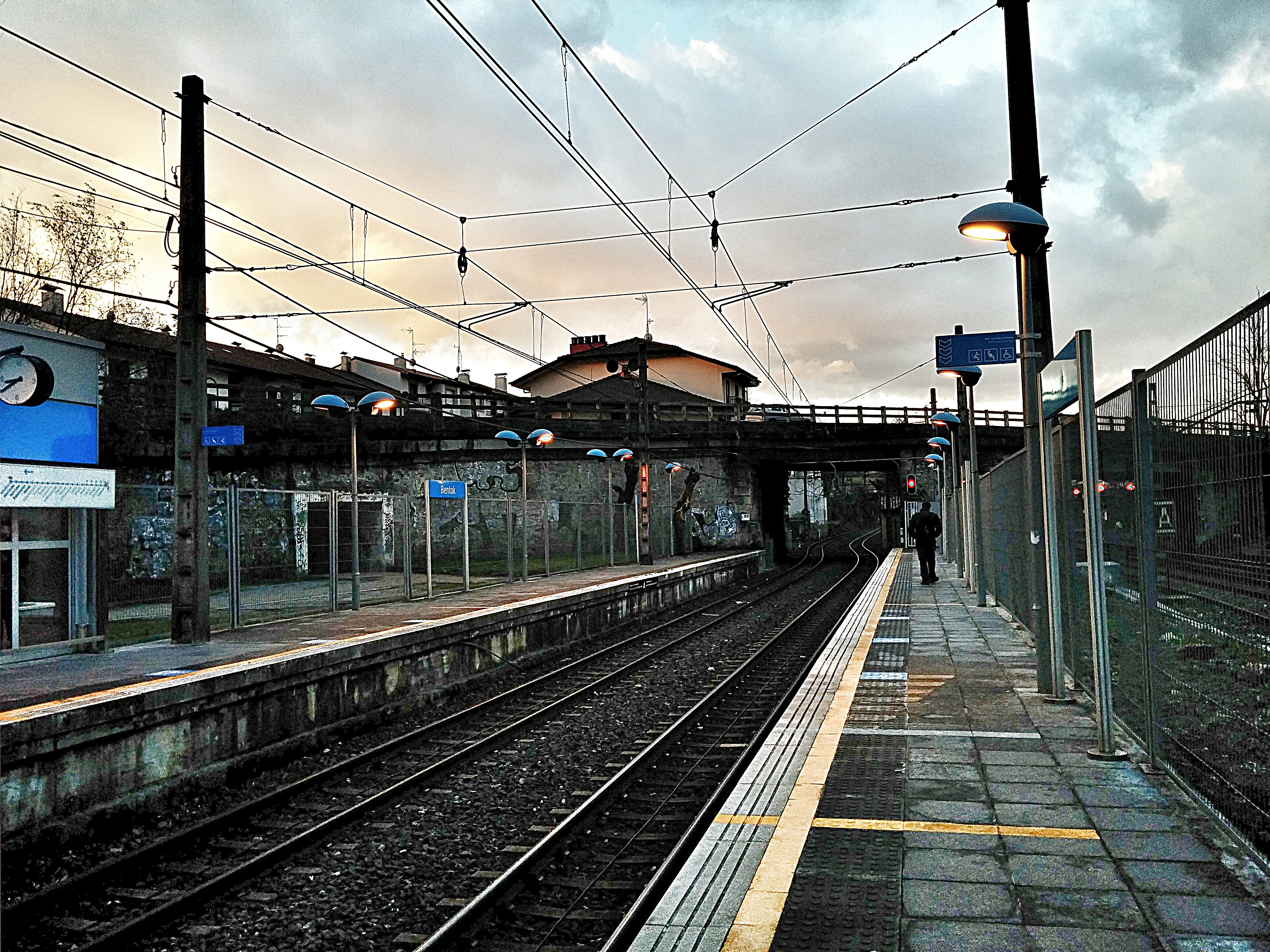
- View of the station

General information
- Location: Irun, Gipuzkoa; Spain
- Coordinates: 43°19′50″N 1°49′01″W
- Owner: Euskal Trenbide Sarea
- Operator: Euskotren
- Line: Line T1
- Platforms: 2 side platforms
- Tracks: 2

Construction
- Structure type: At-grade
- Parking: No
- Accessible: Yes

History
- Opened: 5 December 1912

Services
Preceding station	Euskotren Trena	Following station
Gaintxurizketa towards Lasarte-Oria	Line T1	Belaskoenea towards Hendaia
Location

Bentak is a railway station in Irun, Basque Country, Spain. It is owned by Euskal Trenbide Sarea and operated by Euskotren. It lies on the San Sebastián-Hendaye railway, popularly known as the Topo line. The Cercanías San Sebastián station Ventas de Irun is located adjacent to the Euskotren station.

== History ==
The station opened in 1912 as part of the San Sebastián-Hendaye railway. The access to the station, which previously involved walking along the shoulder of a road, was improved in 2018.

== Services ==
The station is served by Euskotren Trena line E2. It runs every 15 minutes during weekdays and weekend afternoons, and every 30 minutes on weekend mornings.
