= Altza station =

Railway station in San Sebastián, Basque Country, Spain

Altza
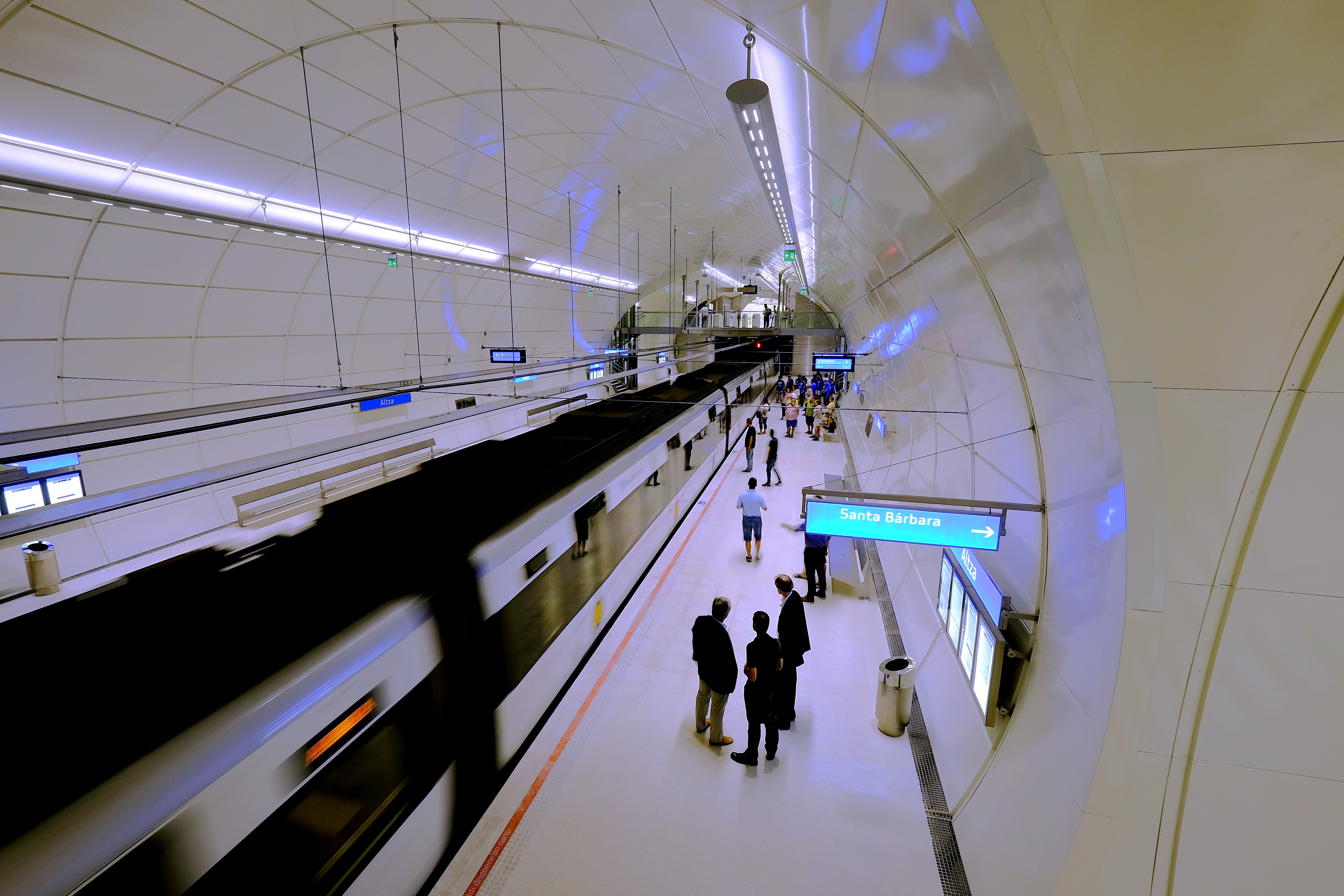
- View of the station

General information
- Location: San Sebastián, Gipuzkoa; Spain
- Coordinates: 43°18′59″N 1°55′51″W
- Owner: Euskal Trenbide Sarea
- Operator: Euskotren
- Lines: Line E1; Line T1
- Platforms: 2 side platforms
- Tracks: 2

Construction
- Structure type: Underground
- Parking: No
- Accessible: Yes

History
- Opened: 12 September 2016; 10 years ago

Services
Preceding station	Euskotren Trena	Following station
Herrera towards Matiko	Line E1	Pasaia Terminus
Herrera towards Lasarte-Oria	Line T1	Pasaia towards Hendaia
Location

Altza is a railway station in San Sebastián, Basque Country, Spain. It is owned by Euskal Trenbide Sarea and operated by Euskotren. It lies on a branch of the San Sebastián-Hendaye railway, popularly known as Topo.

== History ==
The station opened in September 2016, together with the tunnel that connects it with Herrera. As the opening happened during a strike, the official inauguration took place a month later on 9 October.

The station opened as a branch of the mainline, but it was planned as the first station of a new alignment between Herrera and Galtzaraborda. Works on the extension to Galtzaraborda, which will give the station continuity eastwards, started in early 2022. The extension to Galtzaraborda opened in July 2026, with Altza becoming part of the mainline between Amara and Hendaye.

== Services ==
The station is served by Euskotren Trena line E2. It runs every 7.5 minutes on weekdays and weekend afternoons, and every 15 minutes on weekend mornings.
