= Belaskoenea station =

Railway station in Irun, Basque Country, Spain

Belaskoenea
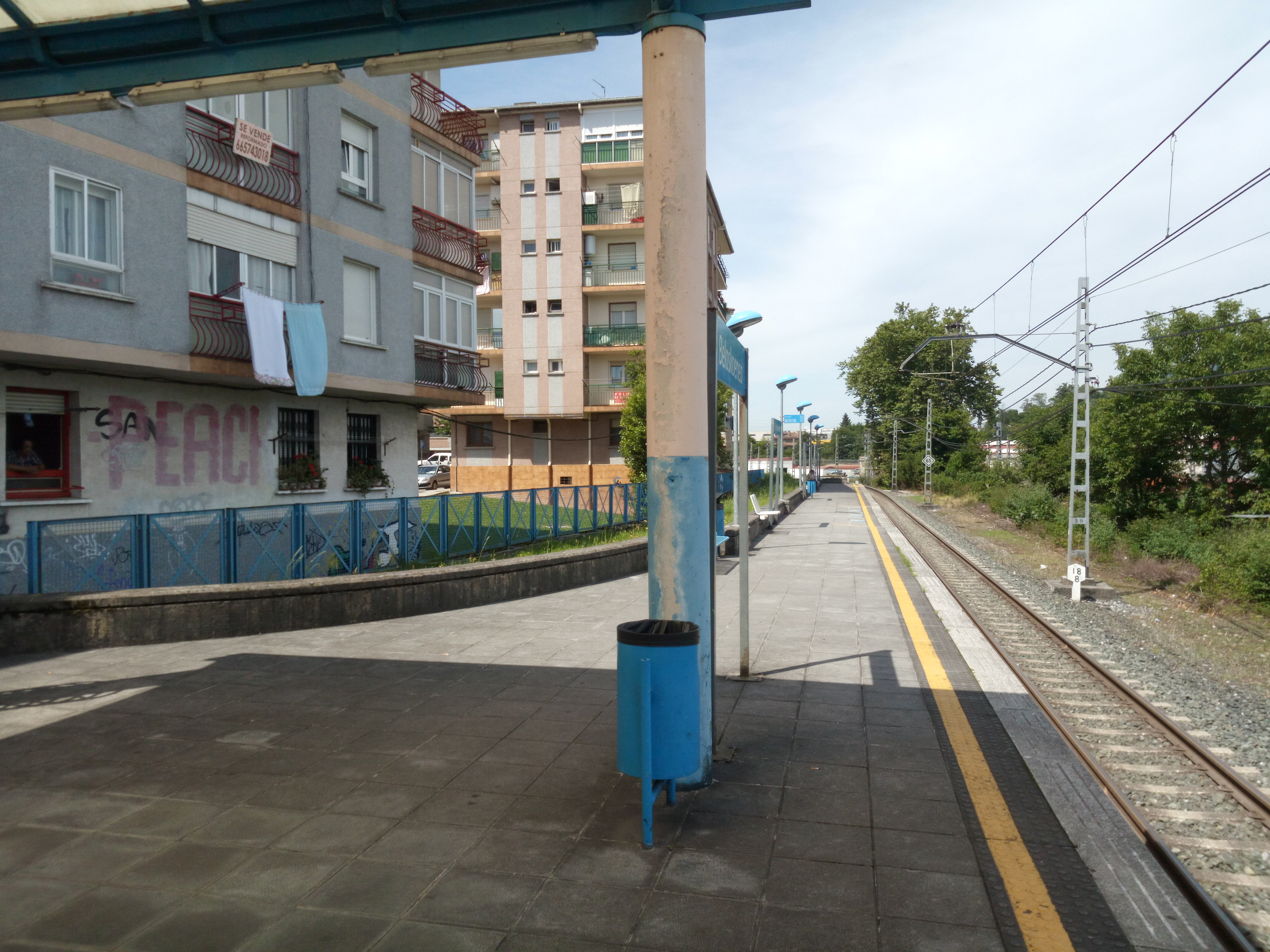
- View of the station

General information
- Location: Irun, Gipuzkoa; Spain
- Coordinates: 43°20′N 1°48′W
- Owner: Euskal Trenbide Sarea
- Operator: Euskotren
- Line: Line T1
- Platforms: 1 side platform
- Tracks: 1

Construction
- Structure type: At-grade
- Parking: No
- Accessible: Yes

History
- Opened: 1992

Passengers
- 2019: 136,203

Services
Preceding station	Euskotren Trena	Following station
Bentak towards Lasarte-Oria	Line T1	Irun Colon towards Hendaia
Location

Belaskoenea is a railway station in Irun, Basque Country, Spain. It is owned by Euskal Trenbide Sarea and operated by Euskotren. It lies on the San Sebastián-Hendaye railway, popularly known as the Topo line.

== History ==
The station wasn't part of the line when it opened in 1912. It was built in 1992 as an infill station, at the same time as Galtzaraborda and Anoeta on the same line. The station was renovated in late 2021 due to the bad condition of the platform and the shelter.

== Services ==
The station is served by Euskotren Trena line E2. It runs every 15 minutes during weekdays and weekend afternoons, and every 30 minutes on weekend mornings.
