= Herrera station =

Railway station in San Sebastián, Basque Country, Spain

Herrera
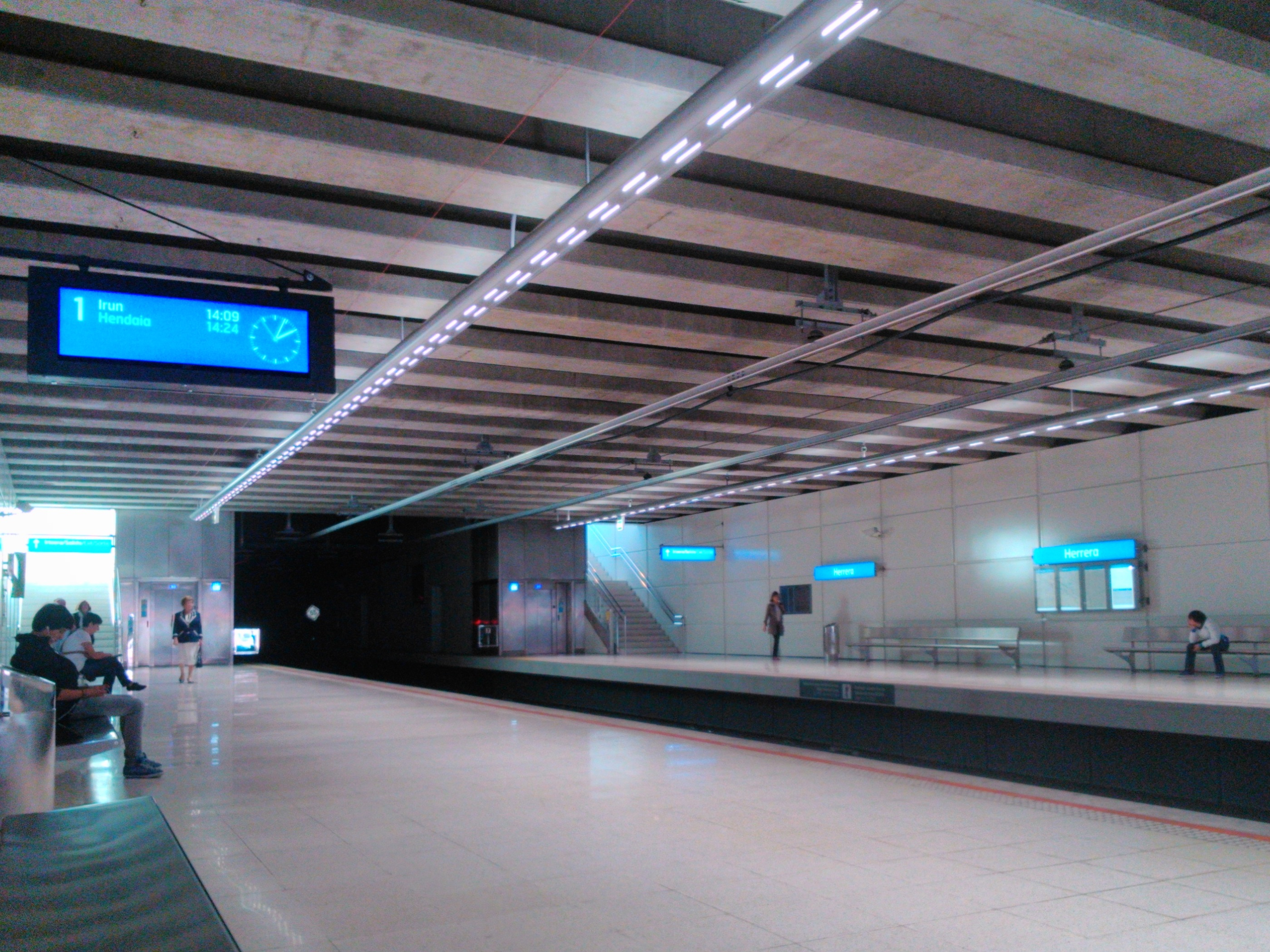
- View of the station

General information
- Location: San Sebastián, Gipuzkoa; Spain
- Coordinates: 43°19′11″N 1°56′20″W
- Owner: Euskal Trenbide Sarea
- Operator: Euskotren
- Lines: Line E1; Line T1
- Platforms: 2 side platforms
- Tracks: 2

Construction
- Structure type: Underground
- Parking: No
- Accessible: Yes

History
- Opened: 5 December 1912
- Rebuilt: 4 October 2012

Services
Preceding station	Euskotren Trena	Following station
Intxaurrondo towards Matiko	Line E1	Altza towards Pasaia
Intxaurrondo towards Lasarte-Oria	Line T1	Altza towards Hendaia
Location

Herrera is a railway station in San Sebastián, Basque Country, Spain. It is owned by Euskal Trenbide Sarea and operated by Euskotren. It lies on the San Sebastián-Hendaye railway, popularly known as the Topo line. The Cercanías San Sebastián station of the same name is located close to the Euskotren station, but the two are not connected.

== History ==
The station opened in 1912 as part of the San Sebastián-Hendaye railway. Originally it was a freight station.

The current station is part of the new alignment between Loiola and Herrera that opened in October 2012. The original single-track tunnel was replaced by a new double-tracked one, and a new station was built at Intxaurrondo. In September 2016, the branch from Herrera to Altza opened.

== Services ==
The station is served by Euskotren Trena line E2. It runs every 7.5 minutes on weekdays and weekend afternoons, and every 15 minutes on weekend mornings.
