= Fanderia station =

Railway station in Errenteria, Basque Country, Spain

Fanderia
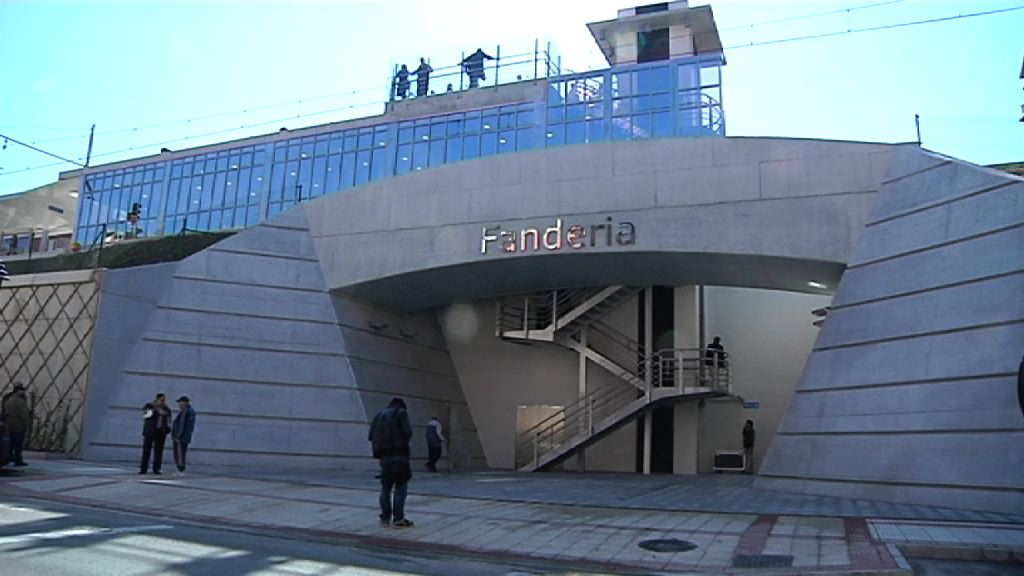
- Entrance to the station

General information
- Location: Errenteria, Gipuzkoa; Spain
- Coordinates: 43°18′30″N 1°53′21″W
- Owner: Euskal Trenbide Sarea
- Operator: Euskotren
- Line: Line T1
- Platforms: 1 island platform
- Tracks: 2

Construction
- Structure type: At-grade
- Parking: No
- Accessible: Yes

History
- Opened: 5 March 2011

Services
Preceding station	Euskotren Trena	Following station
Errenteria towards Lasarte-Oria	Line T1	Oiartzun towards Hendaia
Location

Fanderia is a railway station in Errenteria, Basque Country, Spain. It is owned by Euskal Trenbide Sarea and operated by Euskotren. It lies on the San Sebastián-Hendaye railway, popularly known as the Topo line.

== History ==
The station was not part of the line when it opened in 1912. The station was inaugurated in 2011 as part of the doubling of the line between Fanderia and Oiartzun. It entered service provisionally with a single track on 5 March, and on 31 July trains started running on the second track.

== Services ==
The station is served by Euskotren Trena line E2. It runs every 15 minutes during weekdays and weekend afternoons, and every 30 minutes on weekend mornings.
