= Errenteria station =

Railway station in Errenteria, Basque Country, Spain

Errenteria
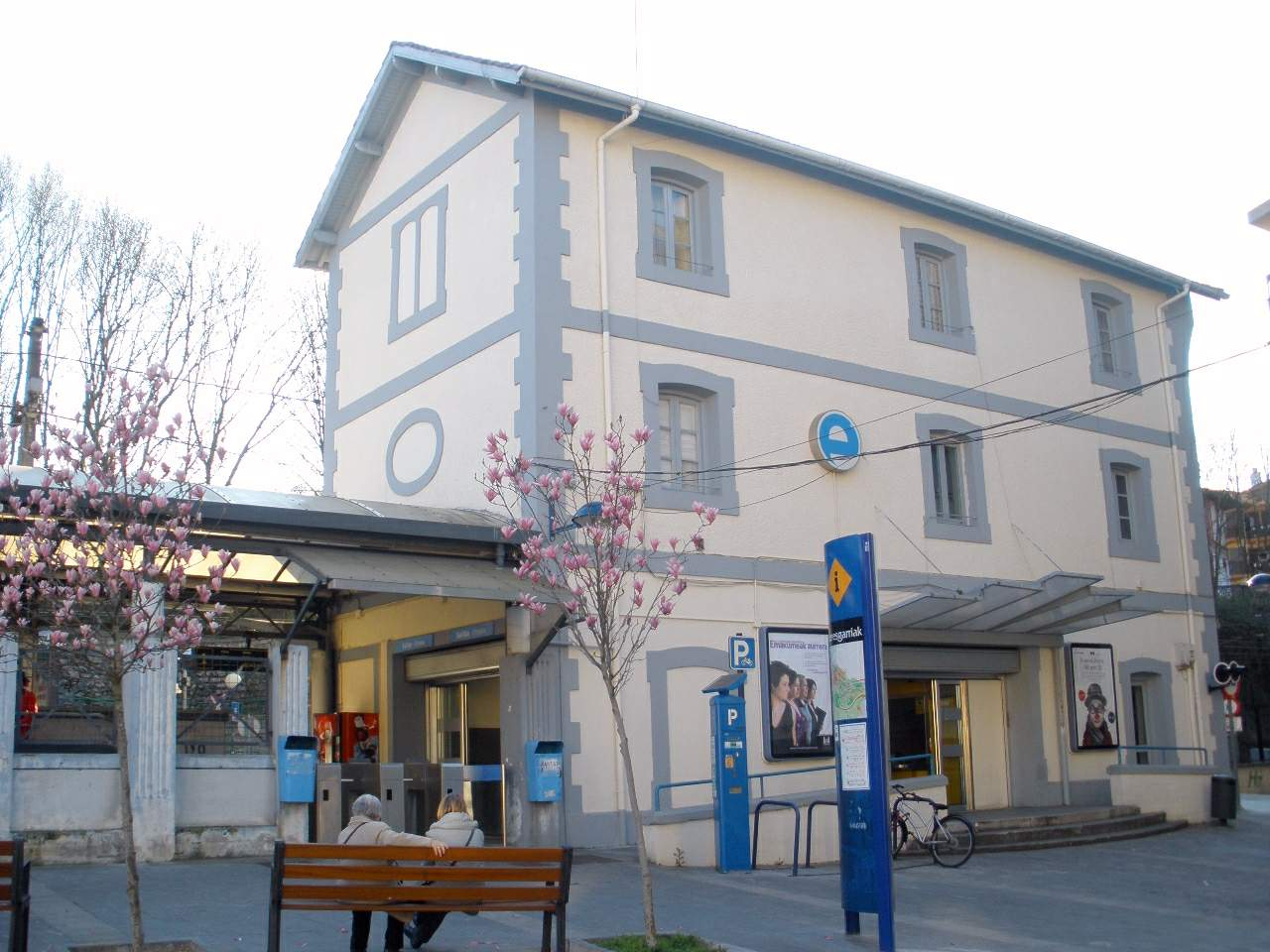
- View of the station building

General information
- Location: Errenteria, Gipuzkoa; Spain
- Coordinates: 43°19′N 1°54′W
- Owner: Euskal Trenbide Sarea
- Operator: Euskotren
- Line: Line T1
- Platforms: 1 island platform, 1 side platform
- Tracks: 2

Construction
- Structure type: At-grade
- Parking: No
- Accessible: Partial

History
- Opened: 5 December 1912

Services
Preceding station	Euskotren Trena	Following station
Galtzaraborda towards Lasarte-Oria	Line T1	Fanderia towards Hendaia
Location

Errenteria is a railway station in Errenteria, Basque Country, Spain. It is owned by Euskal Trenbide Sarea and operated by Euskotren. It lies on the San Sebastián-Hendaye railway, popularly known as the Topo line.

== History ==
The station opened in 1912 as part of the San Sebastián-Hendaye railway. It was one of the most important stations on the line, as the main depot of the railway was located here. After the construction of the Araso depot in Irun, the depot at Errenteria was gradually taken out of service between 2015 and 2016.

== Services ==
The station is served by Euskotren Trena line E2. It runs every 15 minutes during weekdays and weekend afternoons, and every 30 minutes on weekend mornings.
