= Oiartzun station =

Railway station in Oiartzun, Basque Country, Spain

Oiartzun

General information
- Location: Oiartzun, Gipuzkoa; Spain
- Coordinates: 43°19′N 1°53′W
- Owner: Euskal Trenbide Sarea
- Operator: Euskotren
- Line: Line T1
- Platforms: 1 island platform
- Tracks: 2

Construction
- Structure type: At-grade
- Parking: No
- Accessible: Yes

History
- Opened: 5 December 1912
- Rebuilt: 5 March 2011

Services
Preceding station	Euskotren Trena	Following station
Fanderia towards Lasarte-Oria	Line T1	Gaintxurizketa towards Hendaia
Location

Oiartzun is a railway station in Oiartzun, Basque Country, Spain. It is owned by Euskal Trenbide Sarea and operated by Euskotren. It lies on the San Sebastián-Hendaye railway, popularly known as the Topo line.

== History ==
The station opened in 1912 as part of the San Sebastián-Hendaye railway. It was rebuilt in 2011 as part of the doubling of the line between Fanderia and Oiartzun. It entered service provisionally with a single track on 5 March, and on 31 July trains started running on the second track.

== Services ==
The station is served by Euskotren Trena line E2. It runs every 15 minutes during weekdays and weekend afternoons, and every 30 minutes on weekend mornings.
