= Gaintxurizketa station =

Railway station in Lezo, Basque Country, Spain

Gaintxurizketa

General information
- Location: Lezo, Gipuzkoa; Spain
- Coordinates: 43°19′35″N 1°51′30″W
- Owner: Euskal Trenbide Sarea
- Operator: Euskotren
- Line: Line T1
- Platforms: 2 side platforms
- Tracks: 2

Construction
- Structure type: At-grade
- Parking: No
- Accessible: Yes

History
- Opened: 5 December 1912

Services
Preceding station	Euskotren Trena	Following station
Oiartzun towards Lasarte-Oria	Line T1	Bentak towards Hendaia
Location

Gaintxurizketa is a railway station in Lezo, Basque Country, Spain. It is owned by Euskal Trenbide Sarea and operated by Euskotren. It lies on the San Sebastián-Hendaye railway, popularly known as the Topo line.

== History ==
The station opened in 1912 as part of the San Sebastián-Hendaye railway. The station is located next to the Madrid-Hendaye railway, which has a closed station of the same name adjacent to the Euskotren station.

== Services ==
The station is served by Euskotren Trena line E2. It runs every 15 minutes during weekdays and weekend afternoons, and every 30 minutes on weekend mornings.
