= Irun Ficoba station =

Railway station in Irun, Basque Country, Spain

Irun Ficoba
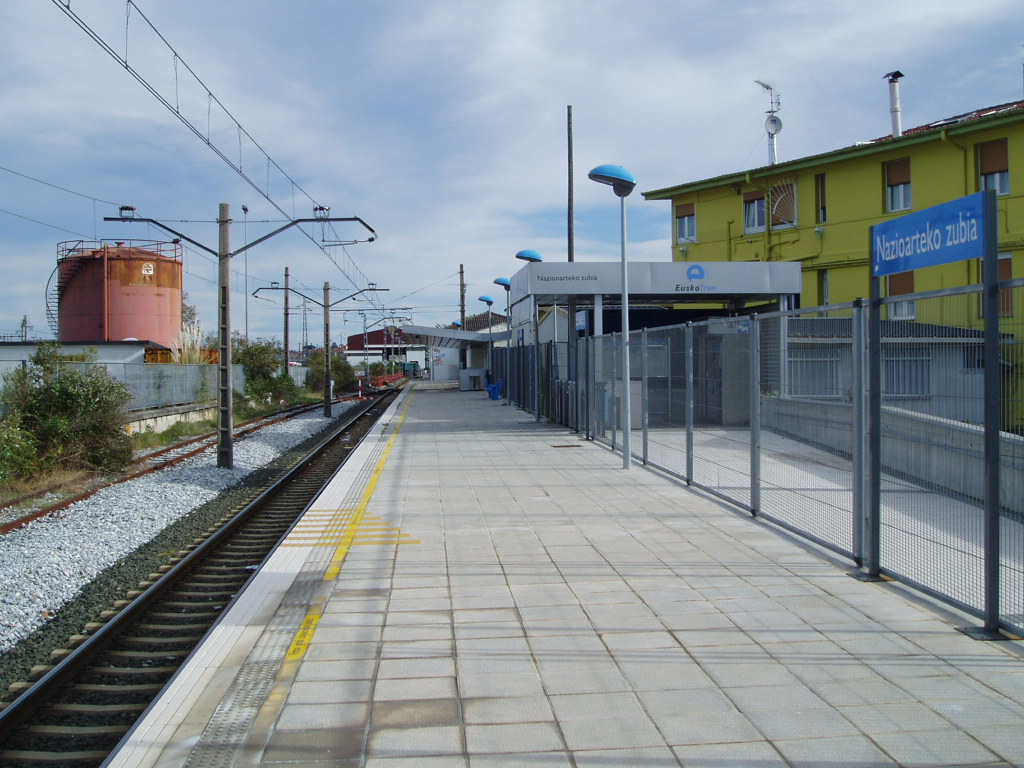
- View of the station showing the old name

General information
- Location: Irun, Gipuzkoa; Spain
- Coordinates: 43°20′57″N 1°47′11″W
- Owner: Euskal Trenbide Sarea
- Operator: Euskotren
- Line: Line T1
- Platforms: 1 side platform
- Tracks: 2

Construction
- Structure type: At-grade
- Parking: No
- Accessible: Yes

History
- Opened: 13 July 1913

Services
Preceding station	Euskotren Trena	Following station
Irun Colon towards Lasarte-Oria	Line T1	Hendaia Terminus
Location

Irun Ficoba is a railway station in Irun, Basque Country, Spain. It is owned by Euskal Trenbide Sarea and operated by Euskotren. It lies on the San Sebastián-Hendaye railway, popularly known as the Topo line.

== History ==
The station opened in 1913 as part of the Irun-Hendaye stretch of the San Sebastián-Hendaye railway. The station, originally known as Puente Internacional (Spanish for 'International Bridge', Basque: Nazioarteko Zubia), was built as a border facility. The platform was divided by a fence: passengers had to get off the train in the first half of the platform, clear the customs, and board the train again in the second half. The customs and border facilities have since been closed, and in 2010 the station acquired its present name.

== Services ==
The station is served by Euskotren Trena line E2. It runs every 30 minutes throughout the week.
