= Anoeta Stadium =

Football stadium

Anoeta
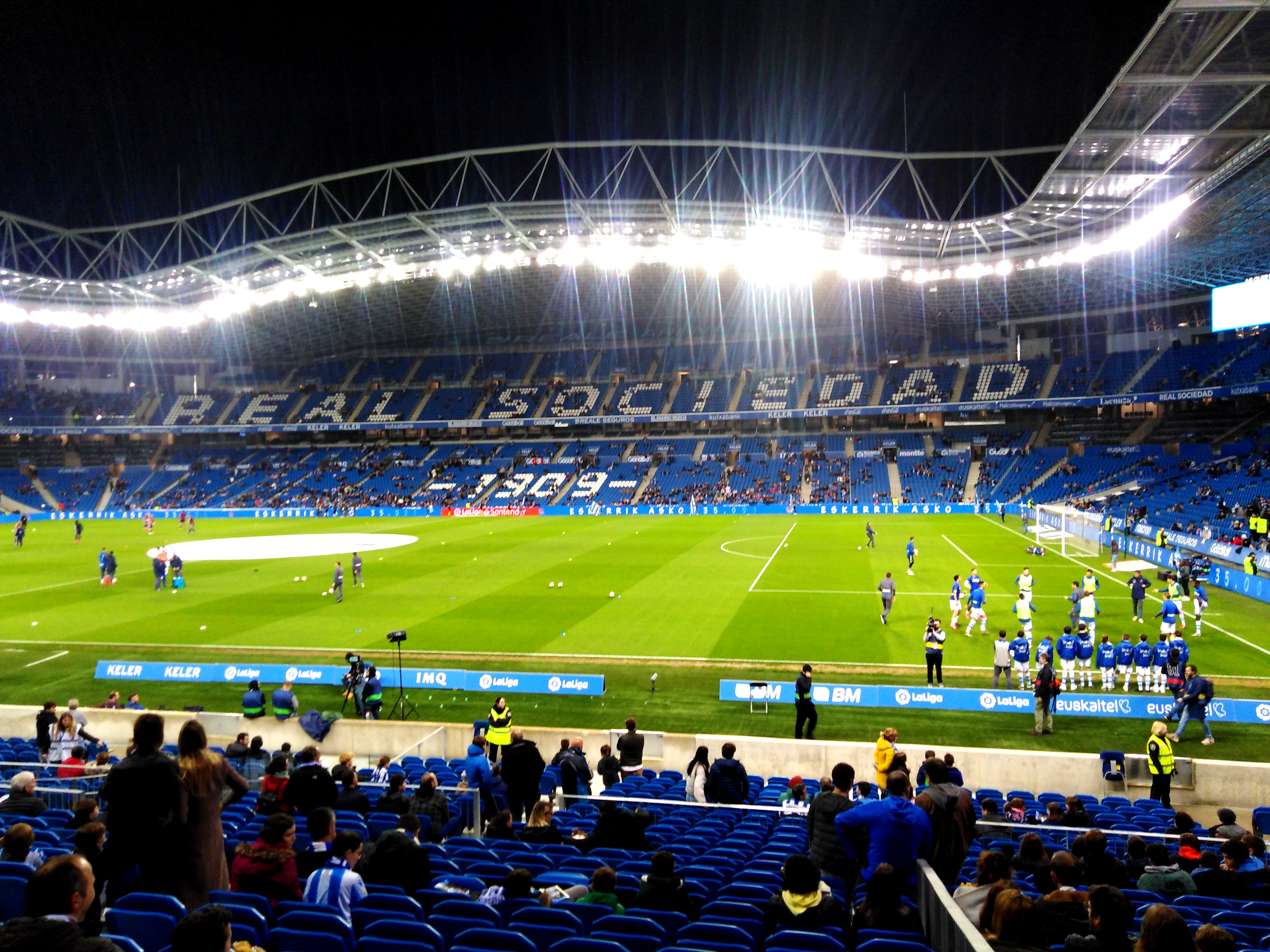
- Anoeta stadium, Donostia-San Sebastian, Gipuzkoa, Basque Country UEFA
- Interactive map of Anoeta
- Location: San Sebastián, Gipuzkoa, Spain
- Coordinates: 43°18′5″N 1°58′25″W
- Owner: City Council
- Operator: City Council
- Capacity: 40,000
- Record attendance: 39,314 (Union Bordeaux Bègles vs Stade Rochelais; French rugby union championship Top 14 semi-final; 10 June 2023)
- Field size: 105 metres (115 yd) x 68 metres (74 yd)
- Public transit: Anoeta

Construction
- Groundbreaking: 1991
- Opened: 1993
- Renovated: 2017–2019
- Cost: Pta3 billion €21 million

Tenants
- Real Sociedad (1993–present); Athletic Bilbao (2013)

The Anoeta Stadium (Spanish: Estadio de Anoeta) is a football stadium in San Sebastián, Basque Country, Spain that was inaugurated in 1993.

The stadium lies at the Anoeta Sports Complex, and is mostly used for football matches where La Liga side Real Sociedad contest their home games. The total seating capacity of the stadium, which was originally 32,000, was restricted to around 26,800 due to redevelopment works; its capacity for the September 2019 completion has been quoted as 40,000 seats (with the possibility of expanding to 42,300 if it were necessary), making it the 11th-largest stadium in Spain and the 2nd-largest in the Basque Country.

It is one of the potential host cities for the 2030 FIFA World Cup, jointly being hosted by Morocco, Portugal, and Spain.

== History and uses ==
It is the third home stadium of Real Sociedad preceded by Ondarreta (1909–1913), and Atocha (1913–1993). The external concourse area features a bust of the late Alberto Ormaetxea, the club's manager during their successful early 1980s period.

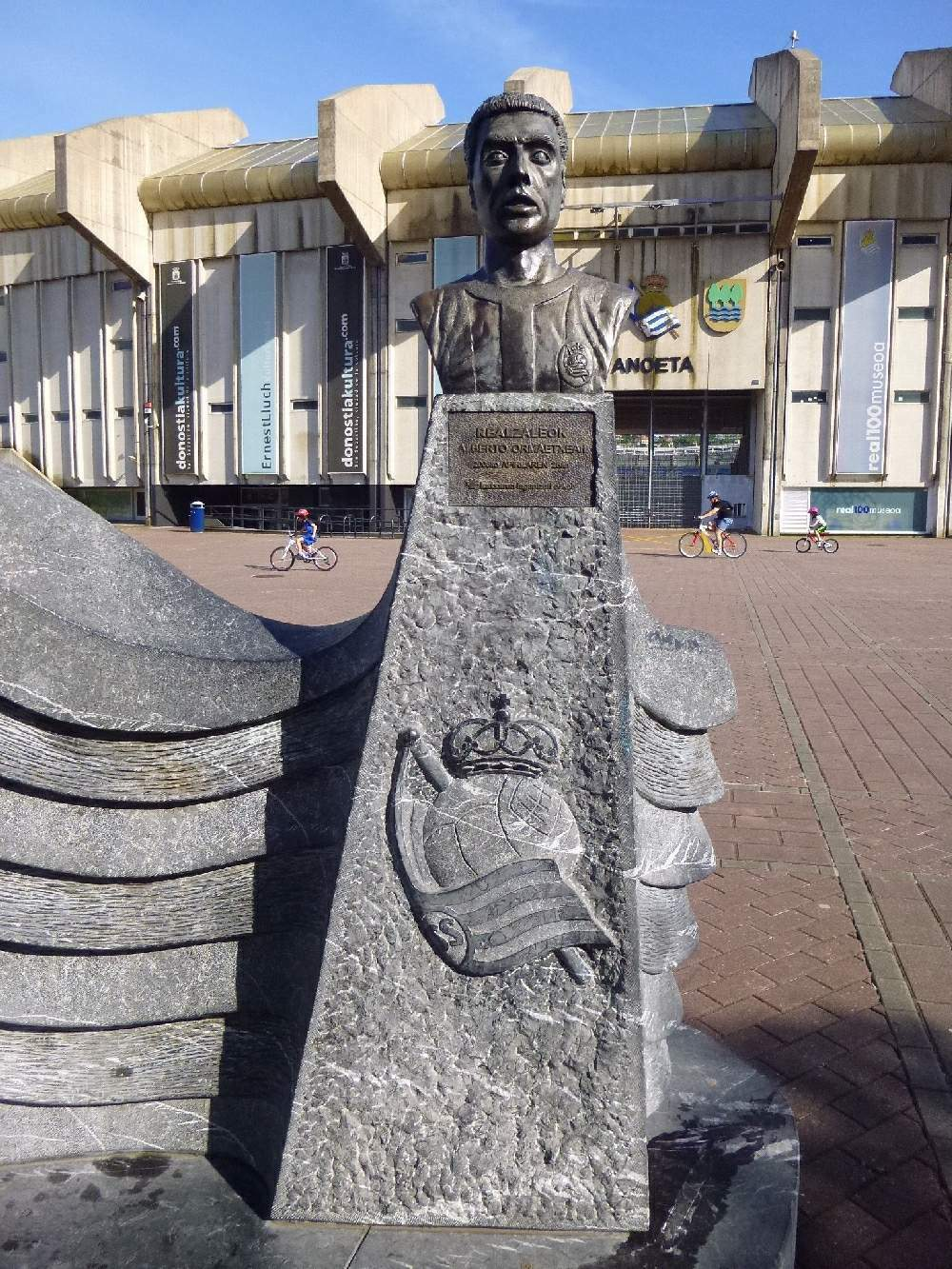
Bust of Ormaetxea

Real Sociedad's Basque rivals, Athletic Bilbao, were also permitted to use Anoeta for their first home game of the 2013–14 La Liga season, as their own new ground (San Mamés) was still under construction. Four of the unofficial Basque Country team's friendly fixtures have been held at the stadium (1993, 1998, 2004, 2012).

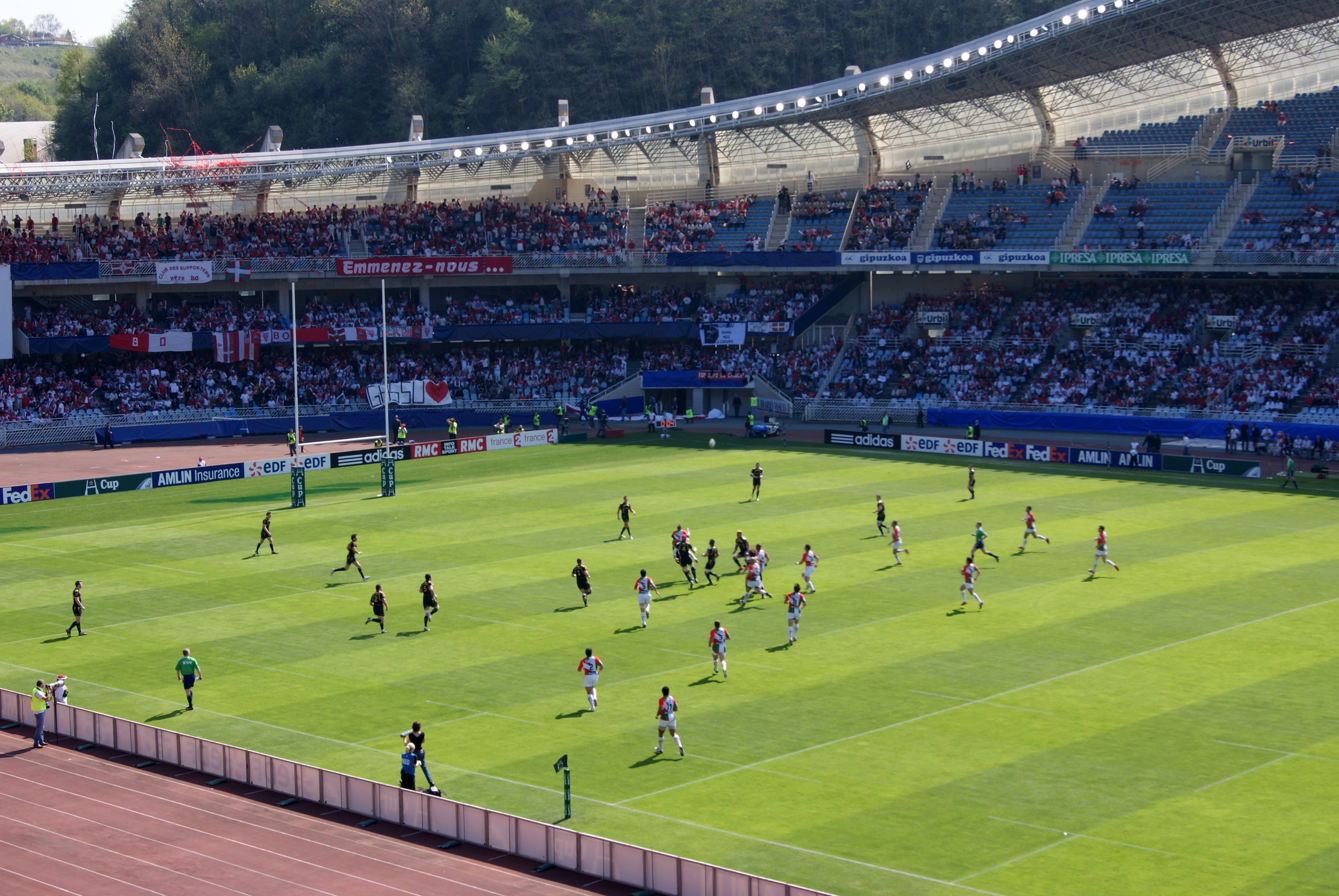
Rugby game at Anoeta

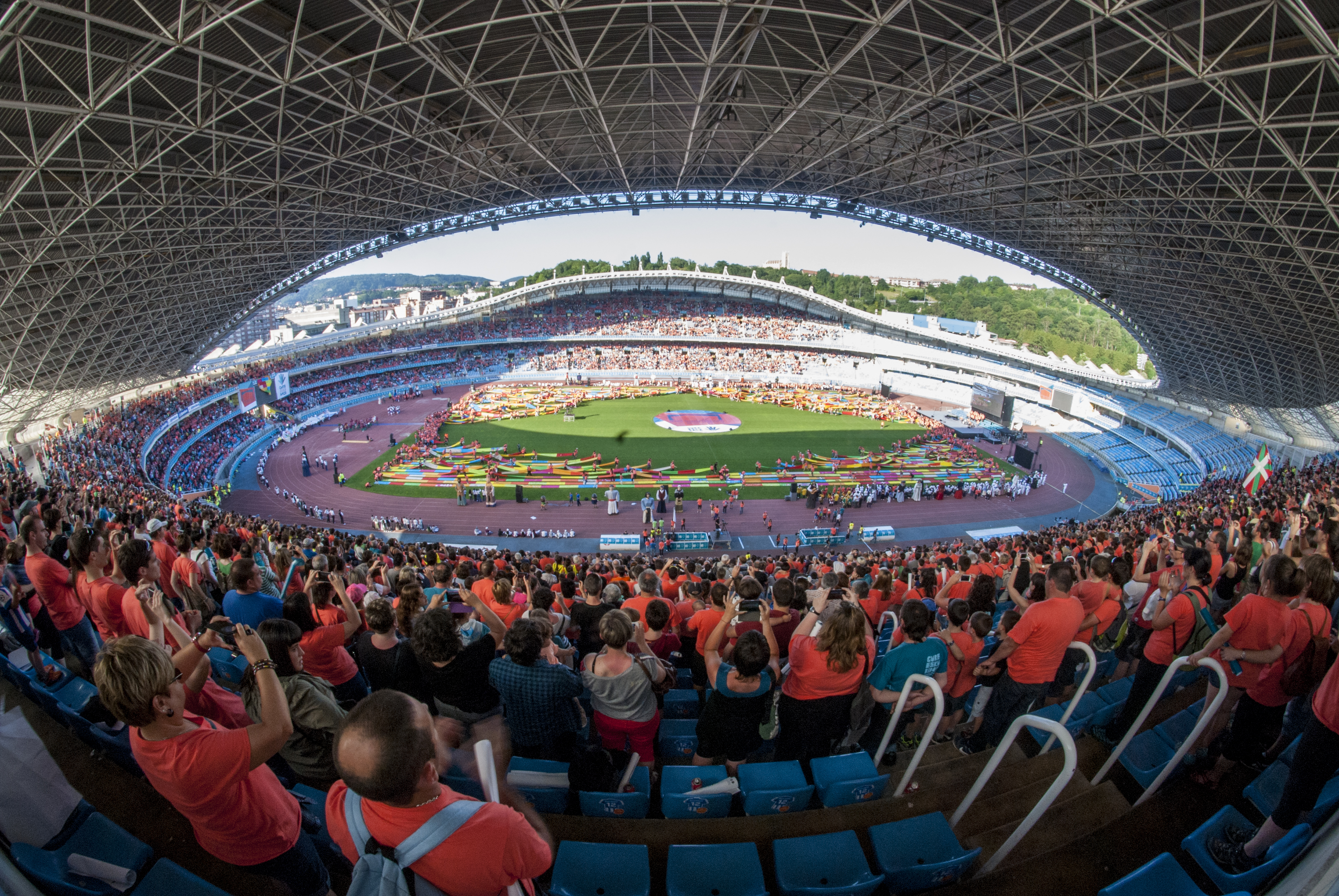
Gure Esku Dago political event at Anoeta, 2015

In recent years, it has also been used for concerts, and for occasional Heineken Cup rugby union fixtures by nearby Top 14 club Biarritz Olympique (based in France but very near to San Sebastian). Since the 2009–10 Top 14 season, both Biarritz and fellow Pays Basque club Aviron Bayonnais took home matches to the Anoeta, which is the closest large stadium to their towns.

When the 2019–20 UEFA Women's Champions League later stages were held in the Basque Country, Anoeta hosted the final.

=== Opening ===
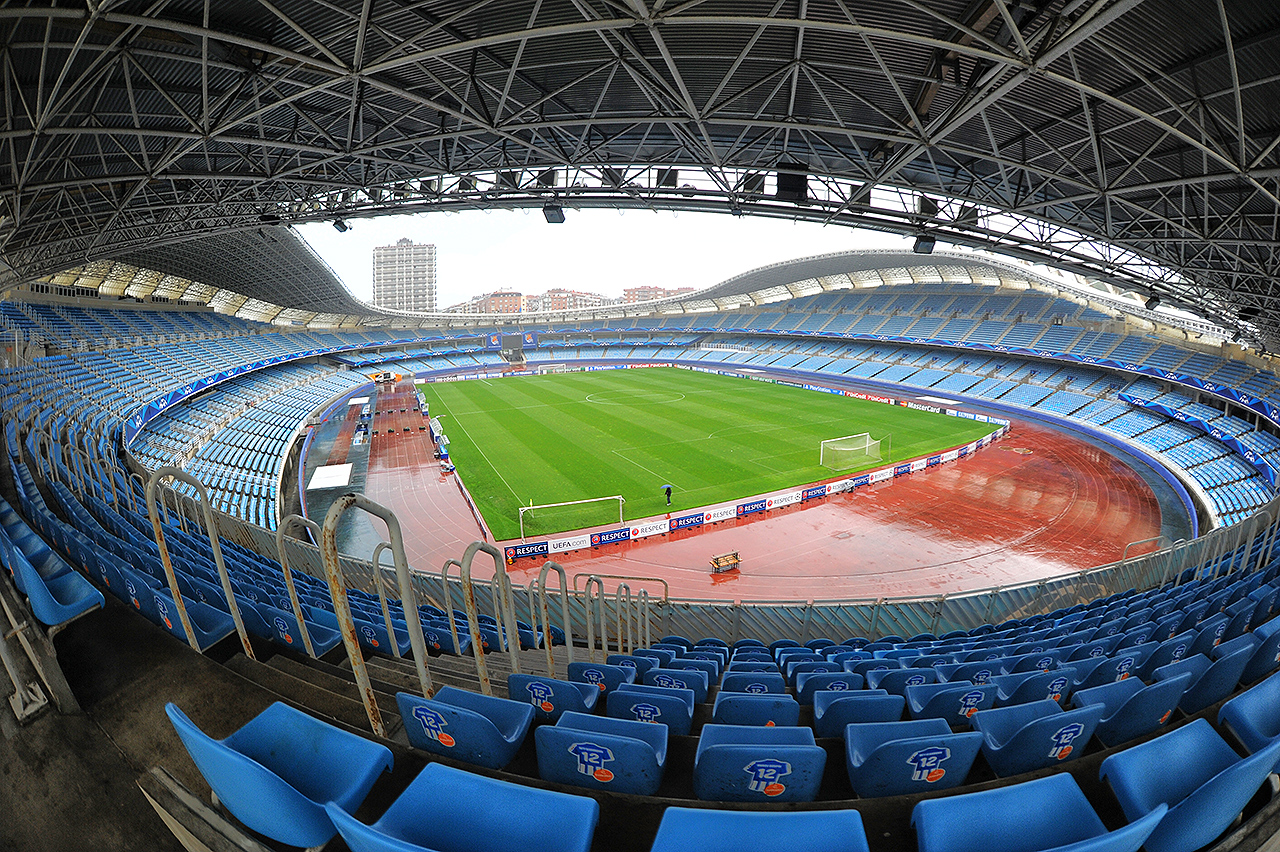
Interior of the stadium in 2013 before reconstruction

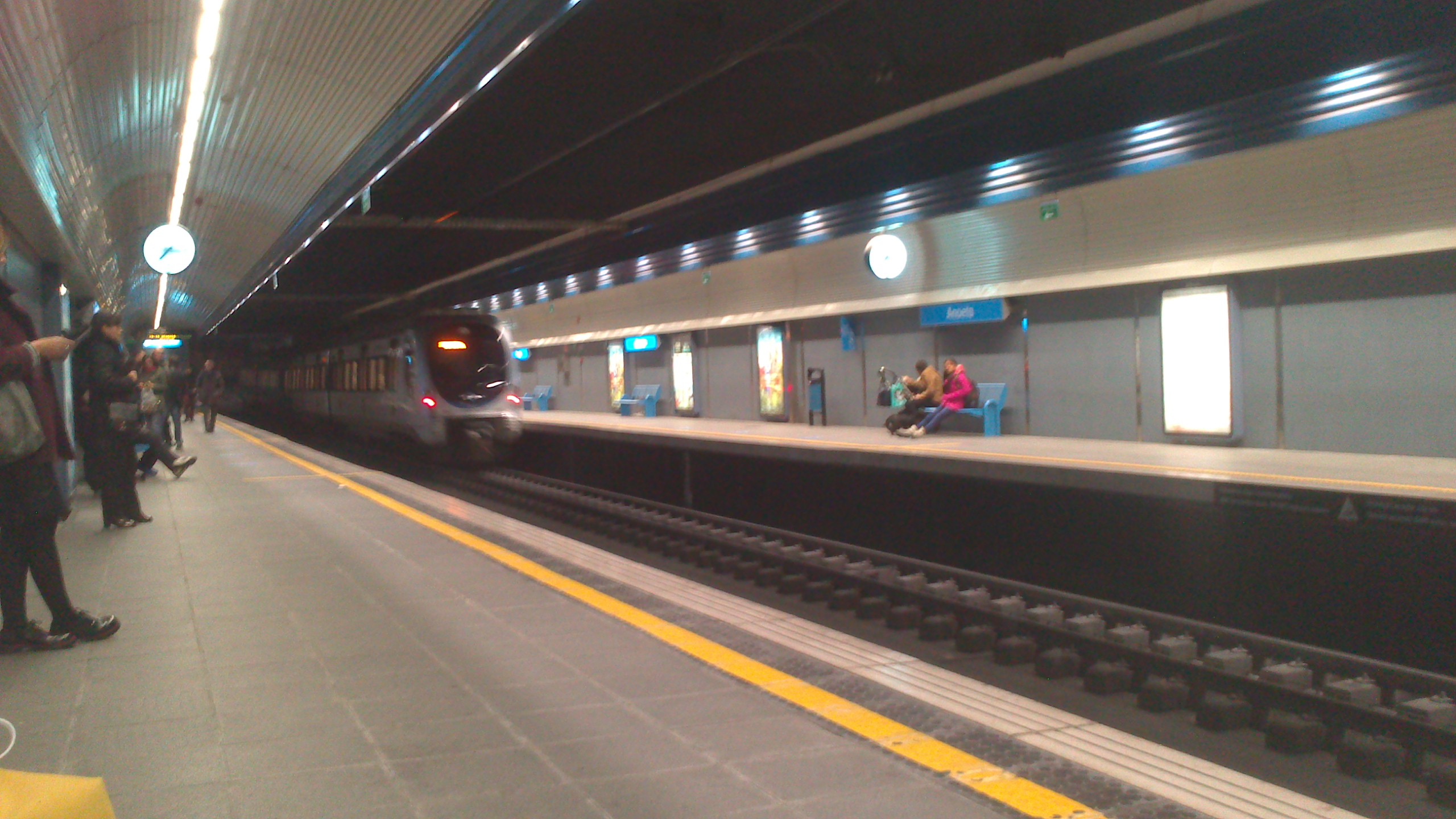
Anoeta station, also opened in 1993, on the San Sebastián Metro network

Anoeta's initial construction costs were said to be 3 billion pesetas (equivalent to around €21 million at the time). The stadium was officially opened on 13 August 1993 with a friendly between Real Sociedad and Real Madrid. The first goal was scored by Txuriurdin forward Loren, and the match finished 2–2.

== Expansion in the 21st century ==
=== Proposals ===
In 2004, José Luis Astiazarán, then the president of Real Sociedad, launched a project called Gipuzkoarena. Planned to be completed in 2007, it was intended to increase the stadium's capacity to 42,000, which would include the removal of the athletics track - over the years, fans were never happy with the stadium in its original configuration due to the track causing a distance between the stands and the field itself, resulting in a "cold" atmosphere during matches. The project also intended to construct a hotel and shops, among other items. This proposal was soon rejected by the city council and left behind.

Towards the end of 2007, Iñaki Badiola, candidate for the presidency of Real Sociedad, proposed that the club buy the stadium. This was also soon rejected by the city council. In 2008, Badiola, by now the president, made another two proposals for the stadium, one of them similar to Gipuzkoarena. These proposals were to be studied by the city council, but after 20 December Badiola was no longer the club's president. Later, his successor, Jokin Aperribay, launched a new attempt to refurbish the stadium.

=== 2015 project ===
In 2015 the club announced that it would begin reforms on Anoeta in 2016, enlarging the stadium as well as removing the track around the field. Construction eventually began in May 2017. When completed in October 2019, the remodelled arena would hold around 42,300 spectators. The €47 million cost of the project was borne between Real Sociedad (€33m), the Basque Government (€10m) and the Gipuzkoa Provincial Council (€4m). the architect is Izaskun Larzabal, who also designed many of the facilities at the club's Zubieta training complex. After the project completion, the total cost announced including some new improvements that would take place until 2020 was of €78,6 million.

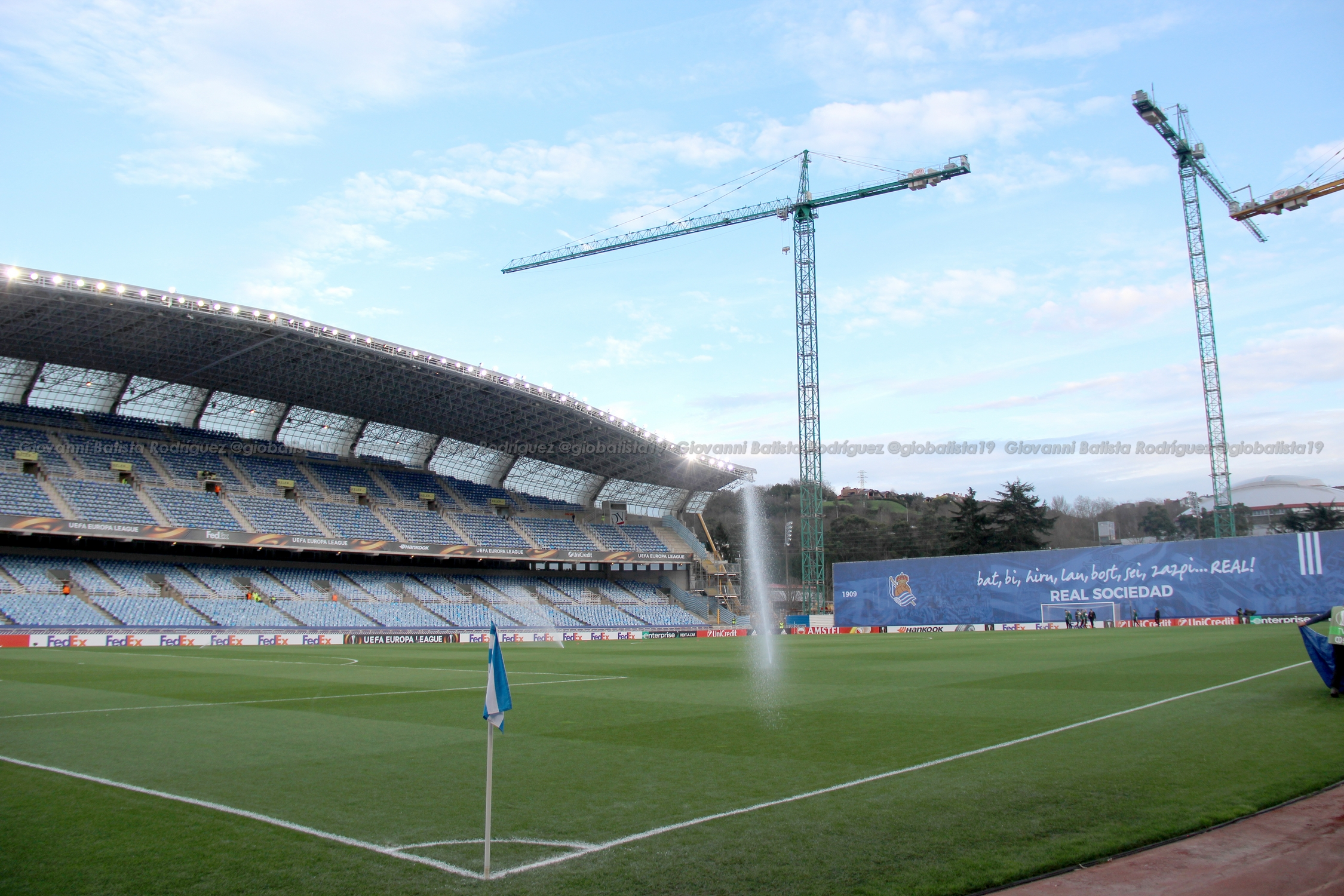
The stadium during the first stage of reconstruction, featuring cranes, February 2018

Depending on any issues and delays encountered, it was reported that the construction work could lead to Real Sociedad playing some matches in Bilbao or elsewhere at some point during the period.

The first phase of reconstruction (involving the removal of the track and insertion of lower rows of seats on the side stands, and a completely new south end stand) concluded just after the start of the 2018–19 La Liga season, requiring the club to play their first three fixtures away from home, before hosting FC Barcelona on the fourth matchday (15 September 2018). Over 3,000 additional members were admitted to the club due to the increase in capacity offered by the remodelled stadium. The second phase of work on the new north end stand was expected to be completed over the course of that season.

Real Sociedad played away from home for each of the first three rounds of the 2019–20 La Liga campaign to allow the stadium rebuild to move to completion. It was announced that the first match at Anoeta – or the Reale Arena to use its new sponsored title – with all seats in place, a capacity quoted as 40,000 would be between the home side and Atlético Madrid on Saturday 14 September 2019, almost exactly a year after the first new stand was opened. Real won 2–0, with the official attendance given as 33,374, greater than the old maximum for Anoeta (and that of Atotxa) and therefore a club record, but some way short of the new capacity. Five months later, a Basque derby against Athletic Bilbao, a 2–1 win for the home side, set a new record of 36,730.

The reforms have transformed the atmosphere inside the stadium, with the Aitor Zabaleta singing section acting as the main focal point.

Following the reconstruction, the stadium was awarded the 2020 World Prix Versailles award in the Sports category.

== Transport ==
Train: Anoeta station, line E2, Euskotren Trena (San Sebastián Metro).

Bus: Line 17, Line 24 Line 28, Line 26, Line 37, and night line B4.

Preceded by Groupama Arena; Budapest	UEFA Women's Champions League; Final venue 2020	Succeeded by Gamla Ullevi; Gothenburg
