= Amara station =

Railway station in San Sebastián, Basque Country, Spain

Amara
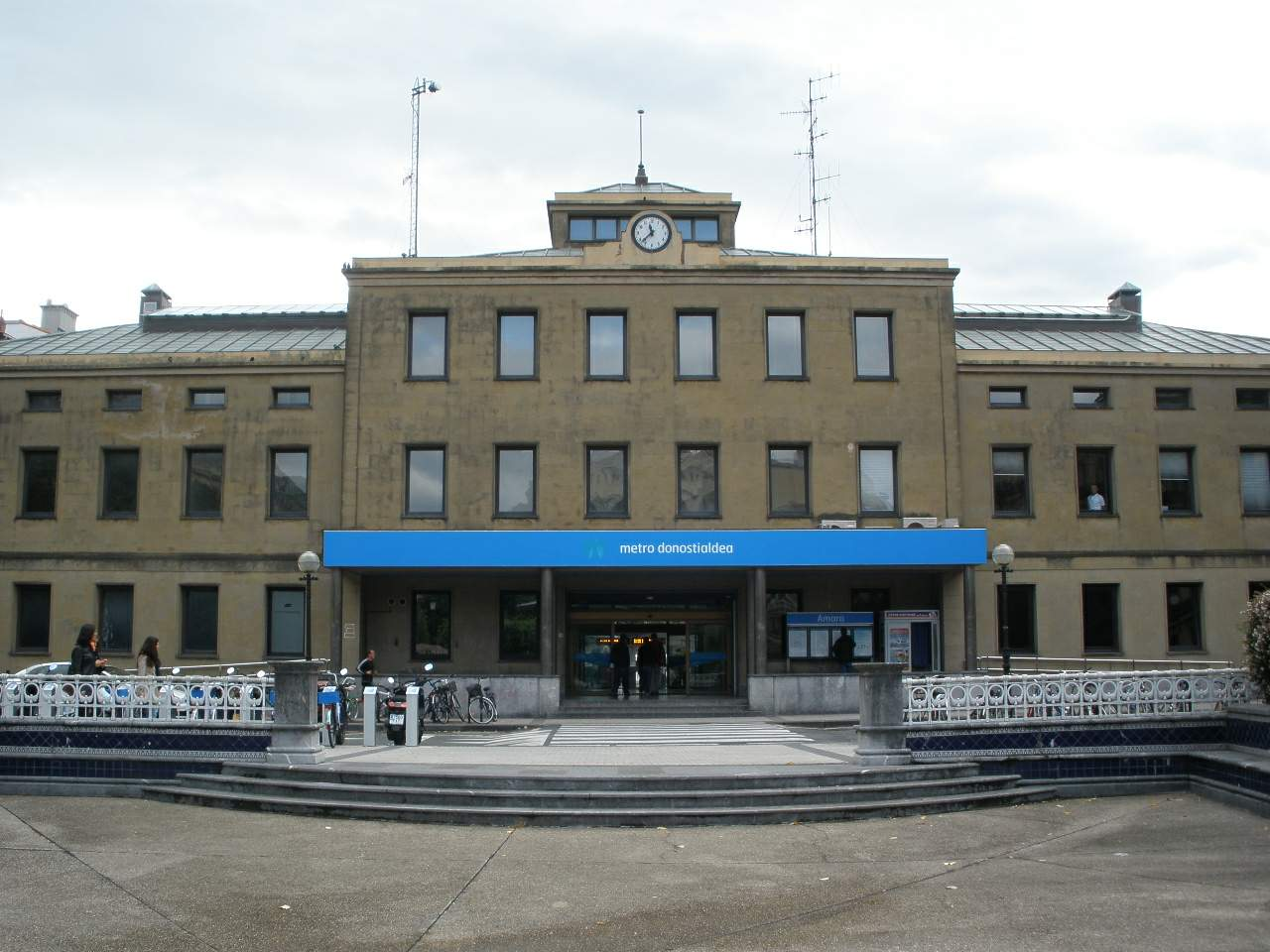
- Station building

General information
- Location: San Sebastián, Gipuzkoa; Spain
- Coordinates: 43°18′47″N 1°58′54″W
- Owner: Euskal Trenbide Sarea
- Operator: Euskotren
- Lines: Line E1; Line T1
- Platforms: 4 island platforms
- Tracks: 6 (equipped with platforms)

Construction
- Structure type: At-grade
- Parking: No
- Accessible: Yes

History
- Opened: 9 April 1895
- Rebuilt: 27 June 1990

Passengers
- 2015: 3,700,000

Services
Preceding station	Euskotren Trena	Following station
Kontxa-Zentroa towards Matiko	Line E1	Anoeta towards Pasaia
Kontxa-Zentroa towards Lasarte-Oria	Line T1	Anoeta towards Hendaia
Location

Amara is a railway station in San Sebastián, Basque Country, Spain. It is owned by Euskal Trenbide Sarea and operated by Euskotren. It is the eastern terminus of the Bilbao–San Sebastián line and is also served by the suburban Topo service.

== History ==
The station opened in 1895 as the eastern terminus of the San Sebastián-Elgoibar railway (which at the time only reached Zarautz). In 1912, the San Sebastián-Hendaye line opened, connecting with the existing narrow-gauge railway at Amara.

Originally, the station wasn't the terminus for the San Sebastián-Hendaye railway. Instead, it reached the city center by running on the streets. Since 1942, the railway and the city council had been in disagreement over the street-running service, and the city loop closed in 1954.

The original station was located to the north of the current one. It was a provisional building built in 1900, and starting in 1912 the substitution of the station was being considered. Various projects were presented, but ultimately they weren't carried out. By the 1970s it was visibly obsolete, and plans for the relocation of the station started to gain traction.

In 1982, the city council and Basque Railways reached an agreement for the rebuilding of the station. The demolition of the old station started on 28 April 1983, with a ceremony presided by Jesús María Alkain, mayor of San Sebastián at the time. Works on the current station building started in 1988, and by mid-1989 it was nearing completion. It was officially inaugurated on 27 June 1990.

As part of the new underground loop through the city center, the station will close and be replaced by a new underground station. The tracks will be dismantled and apartment buildings will be built in the former station area.

== Services ==
The station is served by Euskotren Trena lines E1 and E2. Line E1 runs every 30 minutes (in each direction) during weekdays, and every hour during weekends.

Line E2 is the suburban Topo service. It runs every 15 minutes to and from Lasarte-Oria during weekdays, and every 30 minutes during weekends. In the Hendaye direction, trains run to Pasaia every 7.5 minutes on weekdays and weekend afternoons, while trains to Hendaye run every 30 minutes.
