= Anoeta station =

Railway station in San Sebastián, Basque Country, Spain

Anoeta
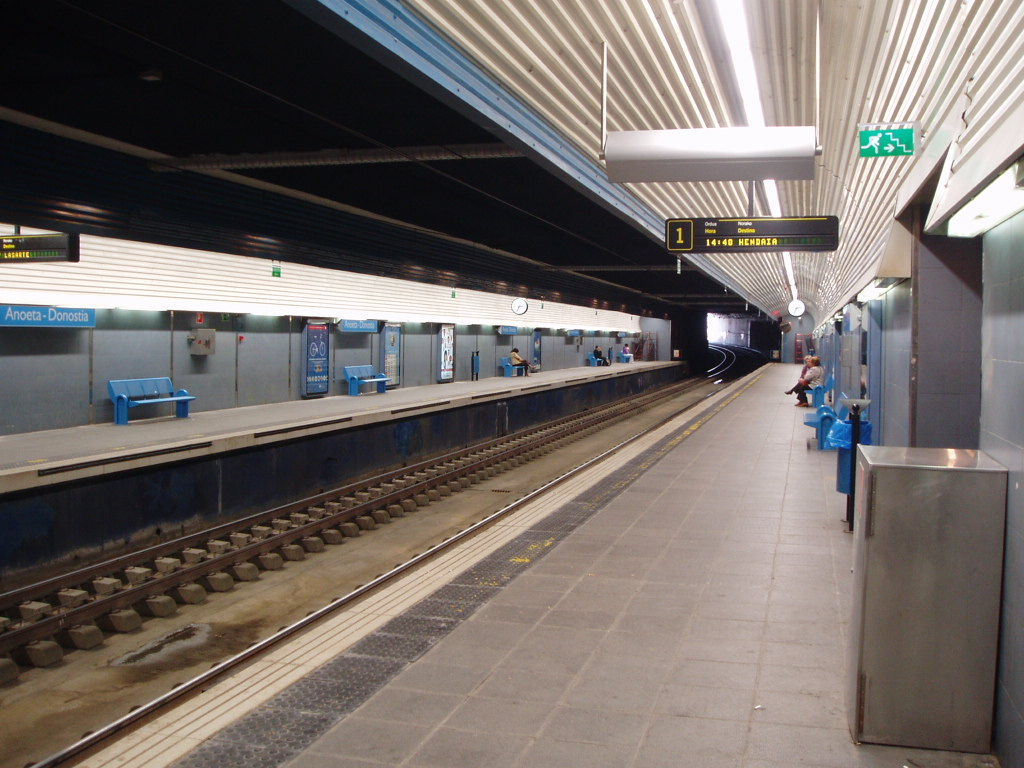
- View of the station

General information
- Location: San Sebastián, Gipuzkoa; Spain
- Coordinates: 43°18′08″N 1°58′31″W
- Owner: Euskal Trenbide Sarea
- Operator: Euskotren
- Lines: Line E1; Line T1
- Platforms: 2 side platforms
- Tracks: 2

Construction
- Structure type: Underground
- Parking: No
- Accessible: Yes

History
- Opened: 1 February 1993

Services
Preceding station	Euskotren Trena	Following station
Amara towards Matiko	Line E1	Loiola towards Pasaia
Amara towards Lasarte-Oria	Line T1	Loiola towards Hendaia
Location

Anoeta is a railway station in San Sebastián, Basque Country, Spain. It is owned by Euskal Trenbide Sarea and operated by Euskotren. It lies on the San Sebastián-Hendaye railway, popularly known as the Topo line. It primarily serves the nearby Anoeta Stadium.

== History ==
The station wasn't part of the line when it opened in 1912. The area was the site of a level crossing with a high traffic level, so the decision was taken to build a tunnel for the railway. The station opened together with the tunnel in 1993.

Due to overcrowding on match days, a second vestibule will be built, with works expected to start in late 2022. It will open in 2025.

== Services ==
The station is served by Euskotren Trena line E2. It runs every 7.5 minutes on weekdays and weekend afternoons, and every 15 minutes on weekend mornings.
