= Bilbao rail network =

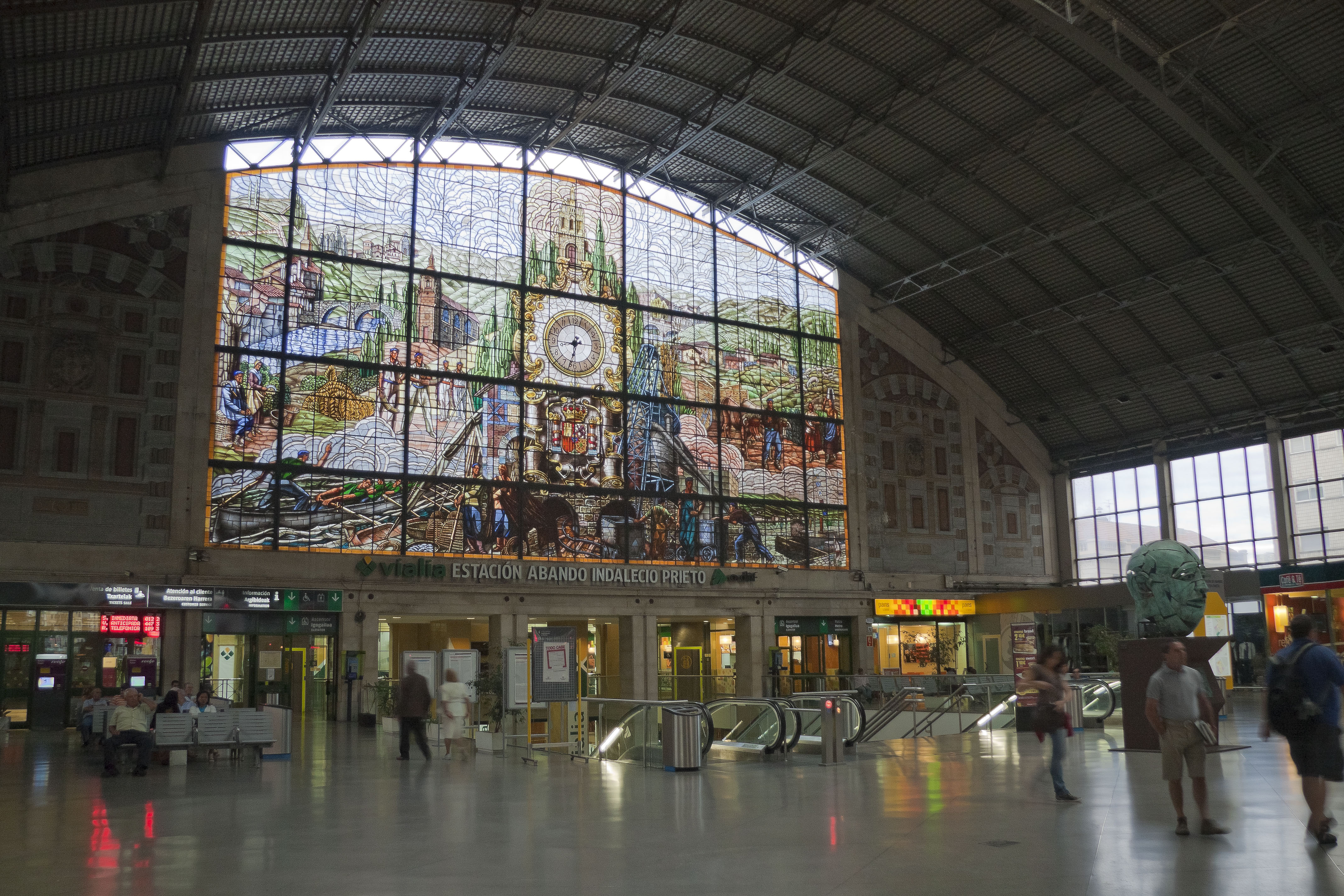
- Vestibule of the Bilbao Abando railway station, a major interchange

Overview
- Owner: Consorcio de Transportes de Bizkaia
- Locale: Bilbao, Vizcaya
- Transit type: Metro, Commuter rail, Tram
- Website: Sistema de transporte público y zonal de Bizkaia (CTB)

Operation
- Operators: Metro Bilbao, S.A., Euskotren (Euskotren Trena and Euskotren Tranbia) and Renfe

Technical
- Track gauge: 1,000 mm (3 ft 3 3/8 in) (Bilbao Metro, Euskotren, Renfe Cercanías); 1,668 mm (5 ft 5 21/32 in) (Renfe Cercanías)
System map

The Spanish city of Bilbao contains a dense urban rail network served by multiple operators, track gauges and types. It is one of a very small number of cities (also including Helsinki and Tallinn) that have both narrow and broad gauge railways without any standard gauge railways.

It currently consists of thirteen lines, counting those of metro and tram as well as suburban rail; complemented by a wide-covering bus network, as well as other means of transportation including funiculars. The services are offered by different companies, whose activity is coordinated by the Consorcio de Transportes de Bizkaia (Transport Consortium of Bizkaia), which integrates their respective operators and facilitates and encourages their use.

The three major operators of the rail transport network are Metro Bilbao, S.A. (2 lines), Euskotren (5 Euskotren Trena lines and 1 Euskotren Tranbia line) and Renfe (5 lines of Cercanías Bilbao). The lines converge in the capital and reach six of the seven regions of the province: Arratia-Nervión, Busturialdea-Urdaibai, Duranguesado, Gran Bilbao, Enkarterri and Uribe. Thus, the only region without rail lines is Lea-Artibai. Areas that lack rail service are served by Bizkaibus.

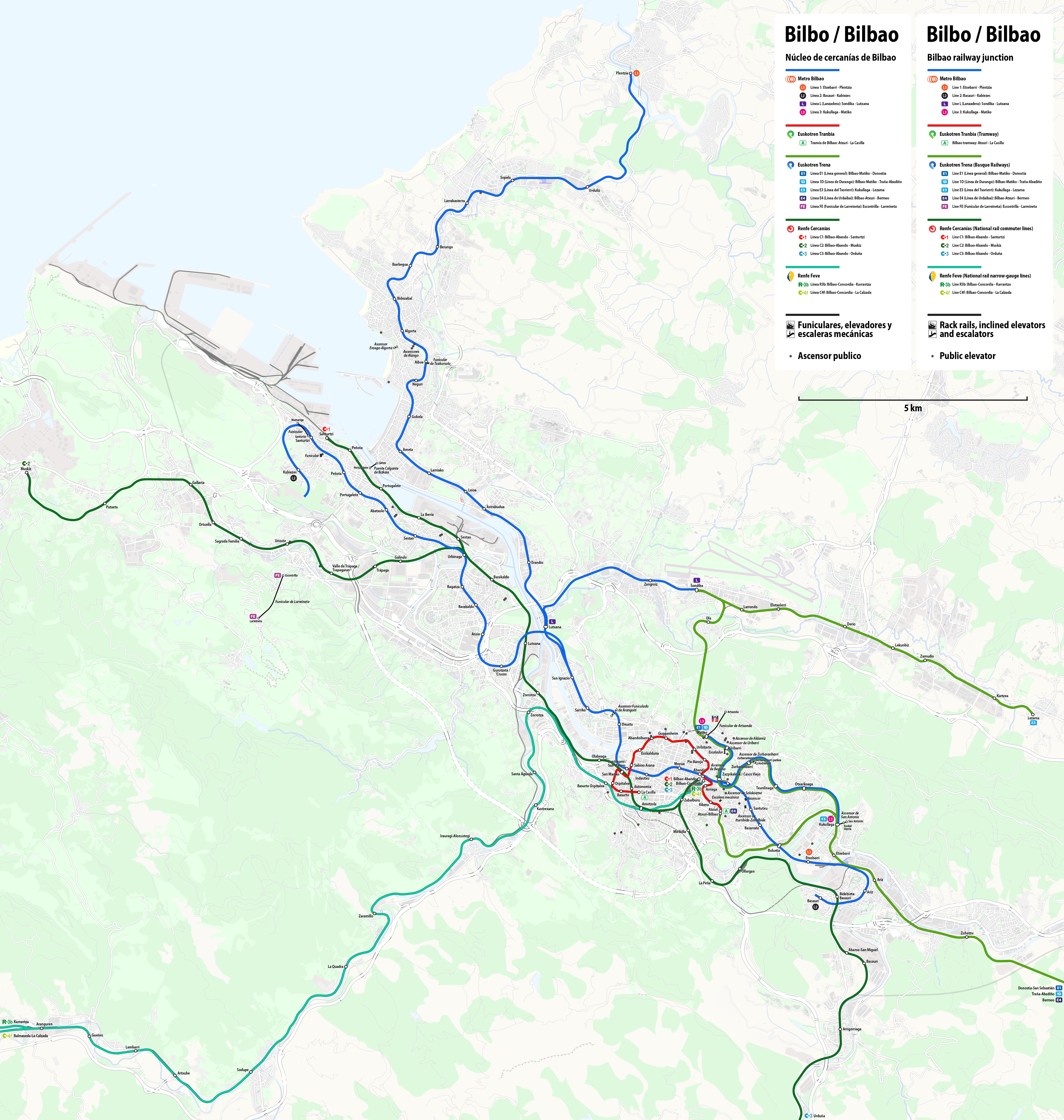
Geographically accurate map of Bilbao's rail services

== Services ==
=== Metro ===
Bilbao's first metro line opened in 1995, has been expanded continually over the years and attracted a ridership of 90 million passengers in 2018. Service is provided by two operators; Metro Bilbao, S.A. (L1, L2) and Euskotren (L3). Interchange between the two operators is provided at Zazpikaleak/Casco Viejo station.

Schematic map of the Bilbao Metro

=== Commuter rail ===
==== Euskotren Trena ====
Euskotren, owned by the Basque Government, is the operator on part of the metre-gauge network. The entire 181.1-kilometre (112.5 mi) network uses 1,000 mm (3 ft 3 3/8 in) narrow gauge rail tracks which have been owned by the Basque Government since their transferral from the Spanish government; the rail tracks and stations were part of the Feve network until its transferral. In 2018 the system carried 22,484,083 passengers.

==== Renfe Cercanías ("Aldiriak") ====
Schematic map of Renfe Cercanías Bilbao

Cercanías Bilbao (Basque: Bilboko Aldiriak) is a commuter rail network in Bilbao, serving the city and its metropolitan area. It is operated by Cercanías, as part of Renfe, the national railway company. It consists of four lines, named C-1, C-2, C-3, and C-4. Three of them start at Bilbao-Abando station, which is the central station of the city, and the other one starts at the adjacent Bilbao-Concordia station. The service was used by over 12 million passengers in 2017.(2017) There is a last commuter line, R3b, which departs from La Concordia, but it is part of the broader Santander-Bilbao R3 line. The R3b only goes up to the Biscayan town of Karrantza, but there is only one eastbound train (and 0 westbounds) on workdays, and no trains on weekends; thus, they are mostly served by the R3's three daily trains.

=== Tram ===

Euskotren operates one tram line of fourteen stops in Bilbao city centre.
