= Pasaia station =

Railway station in Pasaia, Basque Country, Spain

Pasaia
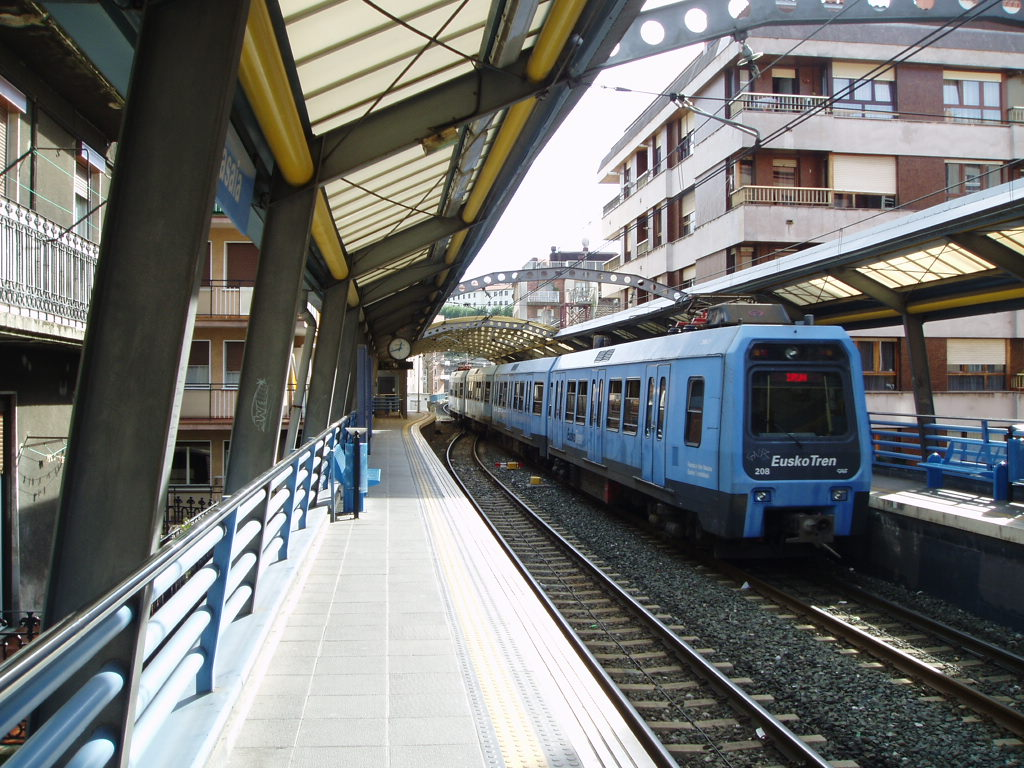
- A 200 series train leaving the former elevated station

General information
- Location: Pasaia, Gipuzkoa; Spain
- Coordinates: 43°19′02″N 1°55′04″W
- Owner: Euskal Trenbide Sarea
- Operator: Euskotren
- Lines: Line E1; Line T1
- Platforms: 2 side platforms
- Tracks: 2

Construction
- Structure type: Underground
- Parking: No
- Accessible: Yes

History
- Opened: 5 December 1912
- Rebuilt: 18 July 2026

Services
Preceding station	Euskotren Trena	Following station
Altza towards Matiko	Line E1	Terminus
Altza towards Lasarte-Oria	Line T1	Galtzaraborda towards Hendaia
Location

Pasaia is a railway station in Pasaia, Basque Country, Spain. It is owned by Euskal Trenbide Sarea and operated by Euskotren. It lies on the San Sebastián-Hendaye railway, popularly known as the Topo line. The Cercanías San Sebastián station of the same name is located close to the Euskotren station, but the two are not connected.

== History ==
The station opened in 1912 as part of the San Sebastián-Hendaye railway. The station was built in a viaduct as otherwise six level crossings would have been required in the town.

As part of the new alignment of the line between Herrera and Galtzaraborda, the station was rebuilt underground, south of its former location. Works started in early 2022 and the new station opened of 18 July 2026. The elevated station will be demolished after the inauguration of the new station.

== Services ==
The station is served by Euskotren Trena line E2. It runs every 7.5 minutes during weekdays and weekend afternoons, and every 15 minutes on weekend mornings.
