= Txorierri =

Valley in Biscay, Basque Country

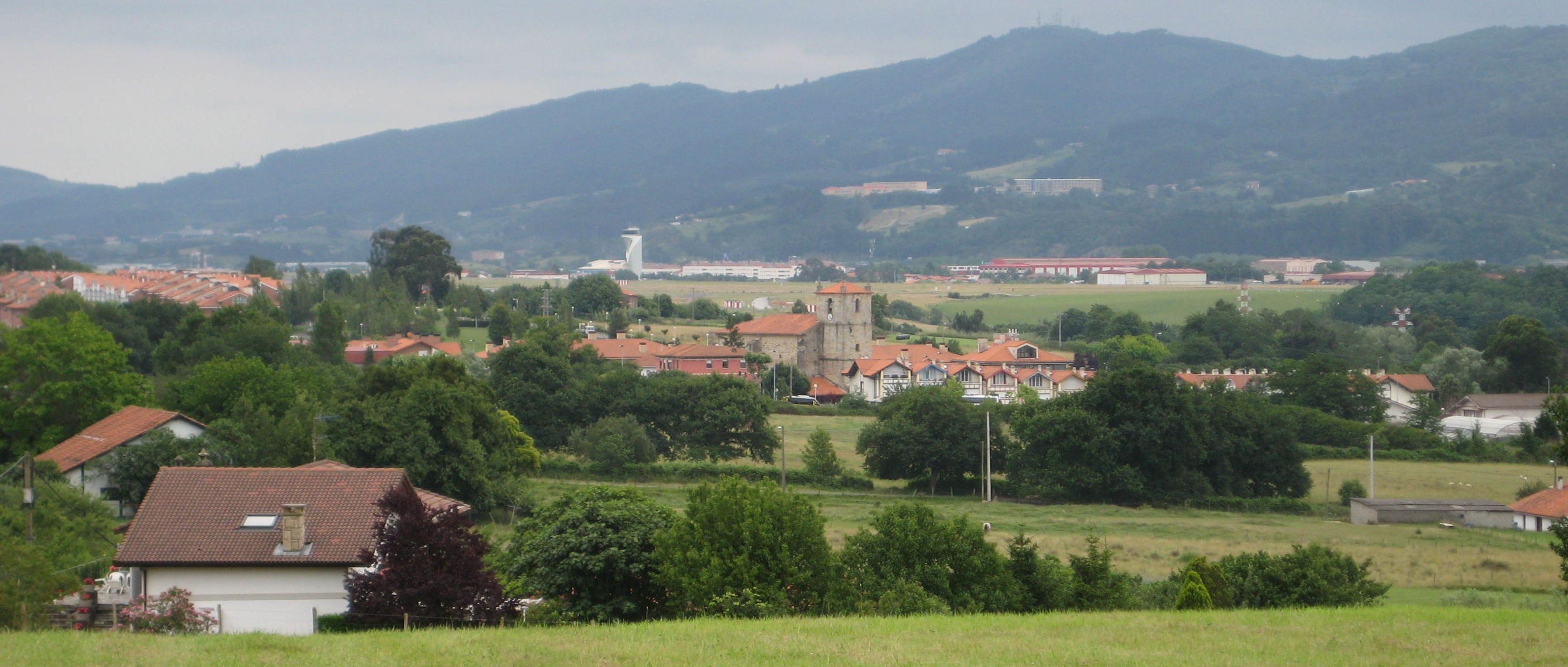
View from Erandio.

Txorierri is a valley of Biscay, Basque Country, separated from Bilbao by low mountains Monte Artxanda and Monte Abril. It includes the municipalities of Erandio, Loiu, Sondika, Derio, Zamudio, Lezama and Larrabetzu. It holds the international airport of Bilbao. It includes industrial and residential areas.
