= Topo (San Sebastián) =

Rail services in Spain

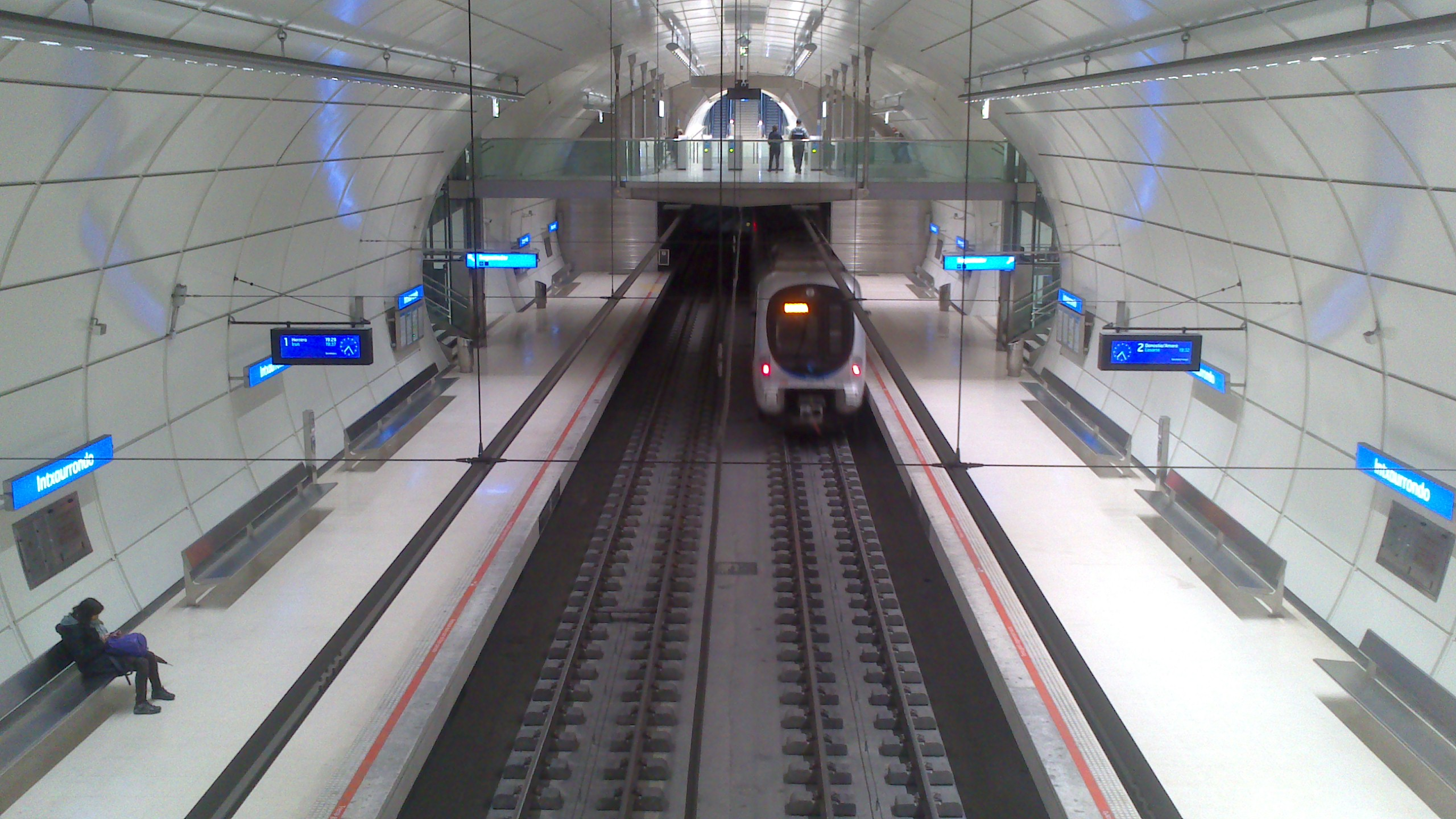
- Intxaurrondo station, 2016.

Overview
- Owner: Euskal Trenbide Sarea
- Locale: Gipuzkoa, Spain and Hendaye, France
- Transit type: Commuter rail
- Number of lines: 1
- Number of stations: 21
- Annual ridership: 12 million (2018)
- Website: euskotren.eus/en/tren

Operation
- Began operation: March 1912; December 2012 (Note: Opening of the new Intxaurrondo and Herrera underground stations, together with the introduction of the Metro Donostialdea brand.)
- Operator: Euskotren

Technical
- System length: 29.8 km
- Track gauge: 1,000 mm (3 ft 3 3/8 in) metre gauge
- Electrification: 1,500 V DC overhead catenary

Topo (Spanish for 'mole') is the common name of a frequent suburban rail service operated by Euskotren in the city of San Sebastián and the surrounding Donostialdea area, in the Basque Country, Spain, up to Hendaye just over the French border. The infrastructure is gradually being upgraded to rapid transit standards, in order to create the San Sebastián Metro (Spanish: Metro de San Sebastián, Basque: Donostiako metroa). The line owes its name to the large number of tunnels present. As of 2021, the San Sebastián suburban rail services are branded as part of the Euskotren Trena network, with no separate identity.

== History ==
The meter-gauge line opened on December 5, 1912 between San Sebastián with Irun. It was extended to Hendaye the following year. The network was subsequently owned by FEVE, the Spanish narrow-gauge railway company, until it was transferred to the Basque Government in the 1970s. In the early 1980s, it was integrated into EuskoTren, along with other narrow-gauge lines in the Basque Country.

Since the 2010s, the line has been gradually upgraded towards rapid transit standards. In 2012, together with the opening of a new tunnel between Loiola and Herrera, it was announced that the line would be renamed to Metro Donostialdea. This branding, however, has since been abandoned. In 2016, a branch was opened from Herrera to Altza. This branch, then operated as line E5, would become part of the new alignment between Herrera and Galtzaraborda. The works on the new Altza–Galtzaraborda stretch began in February 2022, the new alignment opened on 18 July 2026, thus absorbing the Altza branch into the main line.

A 4.2 km (2.6 mi) underground loop through the city centre started construction in late 2017. While originally planned to open in 2022, it finally entered service on 21 November 2026. The new tunnel has three stations: Bentaberri, Kontxa-Zentroa and Amara; the last one of which substituted the former Amara terminus. With the opening of the tunnel, the need to reverse at Amara disappeared, and the line was double-tracked between Errekalde and Galtzaraborda.

== Operations ==
T1 line

Overview
- Service type: Commuter rail
- Current operator: Euskotren

Route
- Termini: Lasarte-Oria; Hendaye

There is one numbered line, T1 (formerly numbered as E2). It has three services: from Lasarte-Oria to Irun, from Lasarte-Oria to Hendaia (each running every 30 minutes during weekdays) and from Amara to Pasaia (running every 15 minutes during weekdays). The Irun to Lasarte-Oria service is reduced on weekends to a twice-hourly service from Irun to Amara on Saturday afternoons. Additionally, trains running on the Bilbao–San Sebastián line call at all the stations between Errekalde and Amara.

Due to the existence of various overlapping services, headways vary depending on the time of the day and location. Since 2026, with the opening of the new alignment between Altza and Pasaia, there is a train every 7.5 minutes between Amara and Pasaia, from 2012 there had been 7.5 minute headways to Herrera. With the opening of the tunnel through the city center, it will be possible to offer regular headways in a longer stretch of the line.

=== Station list ===
The following table shows regular weekday service patterns. The first trains in the morning and the last in the evening make shorter trips.

Trains stop at stations marked with "●" and don't stop at those marked with"｜":

Station	T1		Location
Station	Lasarte/Oria-Hendaia	Lasarte/Oria-Irun	Location
↑ Through-service to/from Matiko or Zumaia via the Bilbao–San Sebastián line ↑
Lasarte-Oria	●	●	Lasarte-Oria
Errekalde	●	●	San Sebastián
Añorga	●	●	San Sebastián
Lugaritz	●	●	San Sebastián
Bentaberri	●	●	San Sebastián
Kontxa-Zentroa	●	●	San Sebastián
Amara	●	●	San Sebastián
Anoeta	●	●	San Sebastián
Loiola	●	●	San Sebastián
Intxaurrondo	●	●	San Sebastián
Herrera	●	●	
Altza	●	●	
Pasaia	●	●	Pasaia
Galtzaraborda	●	●	Errenteria
Errenteria	●	●	Errenteria
Fanderia	●	●	Errenteria
Oiartzun	●	●	Oiartzun
Gaintxurizketa	●	｜	Lezo
Bentak	●	●	Irun
Belaskoenea	●	●	Irun
Irun Colon	●	●	Irun
Irun Ficoba	●		Irun
Hendaia	●		Hendaye

== Rolling stock ==
The line shares rolling stock with the rest of the Euskotren Trena network. Currently, 900 series trains are used. In the past, 200, 300 and 3500 series trains were used.

== See also ==
- Bilbao Metro
