= Cercanías San Sebastián =

Commuter railway in Gipuzkoa, Basque Country, Spain

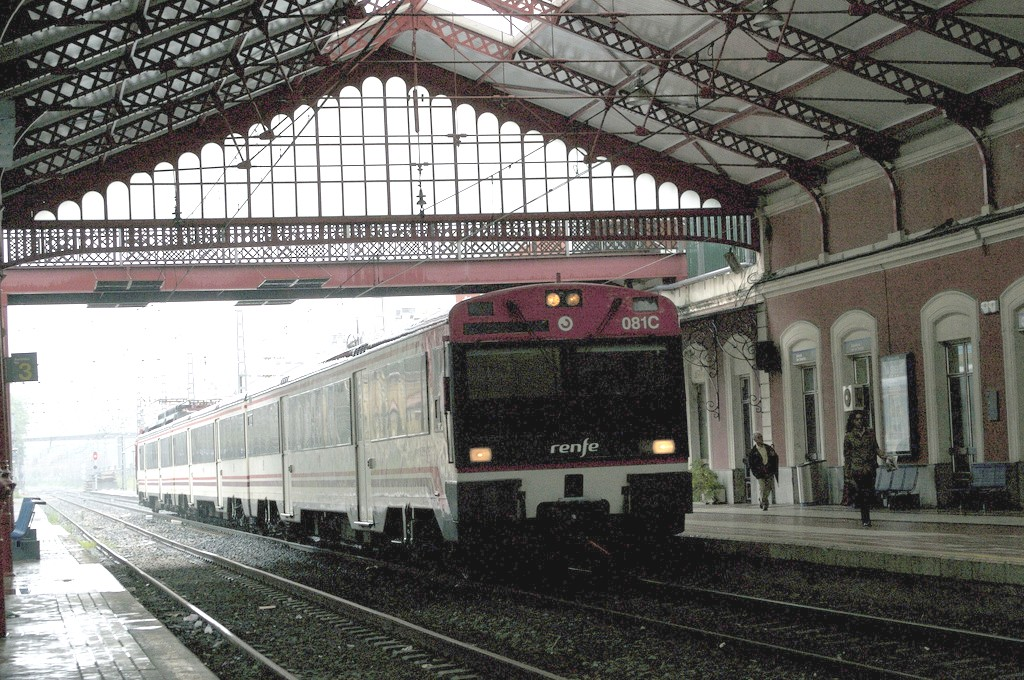
- A Cercanías unit at San Sebastián station

Overview
- Service type: Commuter rail
- Current operator(s): Renfe
- Ridership: 6,633,500 (2022)

Route
- Termini: Irun; Brinkola
- Stops: 30
- Line(s) used: Madrid–Hendaye railway

Cercanías San Sebastián (Basque: Donostiako Renfe Aldiriak) is a commuter railway service provided by Renfe serving the city of San Sebastián and towns in the interior of Gipuzkoa in the Basque Country, Spain. It serves around six million passengers a year.

This railway service uses the Madrid–Hendaye railway line, serving 30 stations. Dual gauge is being installed in the section between Astigarraga and Irun. When completed, it will be possible to extend the commuter rail service to Bayonne in France. Despite running parallel to Euskotren's suburban service between San Sebastián and Irun, the lines lack a proper interchange station, with only out of station interchanges available. The construction of a new station at Riberas de Loiola has been proposed, this station would add a direct connection between the two networks.
