= Euskotren Trena =

Railway service in the Basque Country, Spain

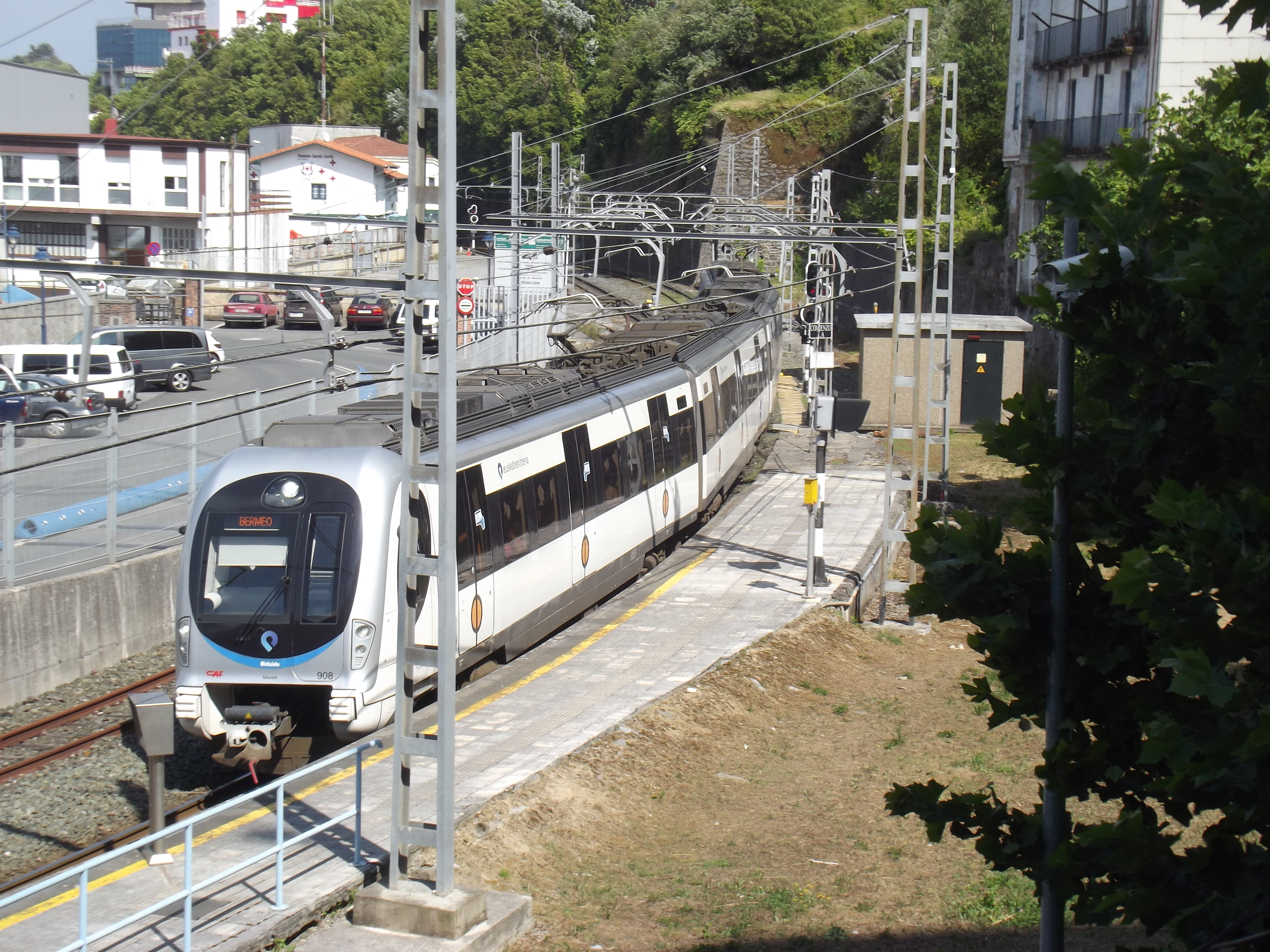
- A 950 series EMU in Bermeo, July 2015

Overview
- Owner: Euskal Trenbide Sarea
- Locale: Biscay, Gipuzkoa (Basque Country, Spain)
- Transit type: Commuter rail; Inter-city rail; Rapid transit
- Number of lines: 7 (Note: Includes the Lutxana-Sondika shuttle, not shown on maps.)
- Number of stations: 82
- Annual ridership: 39.5 million (2018)
- Headquarters: 8 Atxuri Street, Bilbao, Biscay
- Website: euskotren.eus/en/tren

Operation
- Began operation: 1982
- Operator: Euskotren

Technical
- System length: 182.5 km (113.4 mi) (2021)
- Track gauge: 1,000 mm (3 ft 3 3/8 in) metre gauge
- Electrification: 1,500 V DC overhead catenary

Euskotren Trena, formerly known just as Euskotren, is a commuter, inter-city and urban transit train-operating company that operates local and inter-city passenger services in the provinces of Biscay and Gipuzkoa, in the Basque Country, Spain. It is one of the four commercial brands under which Euskotren operates, as a public company managed by the Basque Government. The entire 181.1-kilometre (112.5 mi) network uses 1,000 mm (3 ft 3 3/8 in) narrow gauge rail tracks which have been owned by the Basque Government since their transferral from the Spanish government; the rail tracks and stations were part of the FEVE network until its transferral. Euskotren Trena also operates the Donostia/San Sebastián metro under the brand Metro Donostialdea.

Euskotren Trena operates the railway services and networks, while Euskotren Tranbia operates the tram networks, Euskotren Autobusa the bus services and Euskotren Kargo the freight rail services. Since 2006 Euskotren Trena has been the commercial brand for the operator of the railway network in the Basque Country, which is Euskotren, while the network itself is owned by the public entity Euskal Trenbide Sarea. In 2012 the commercial brand was changed from simply Euskotren to Euskotren Trena, adding the Basque word trena.

== Services ==
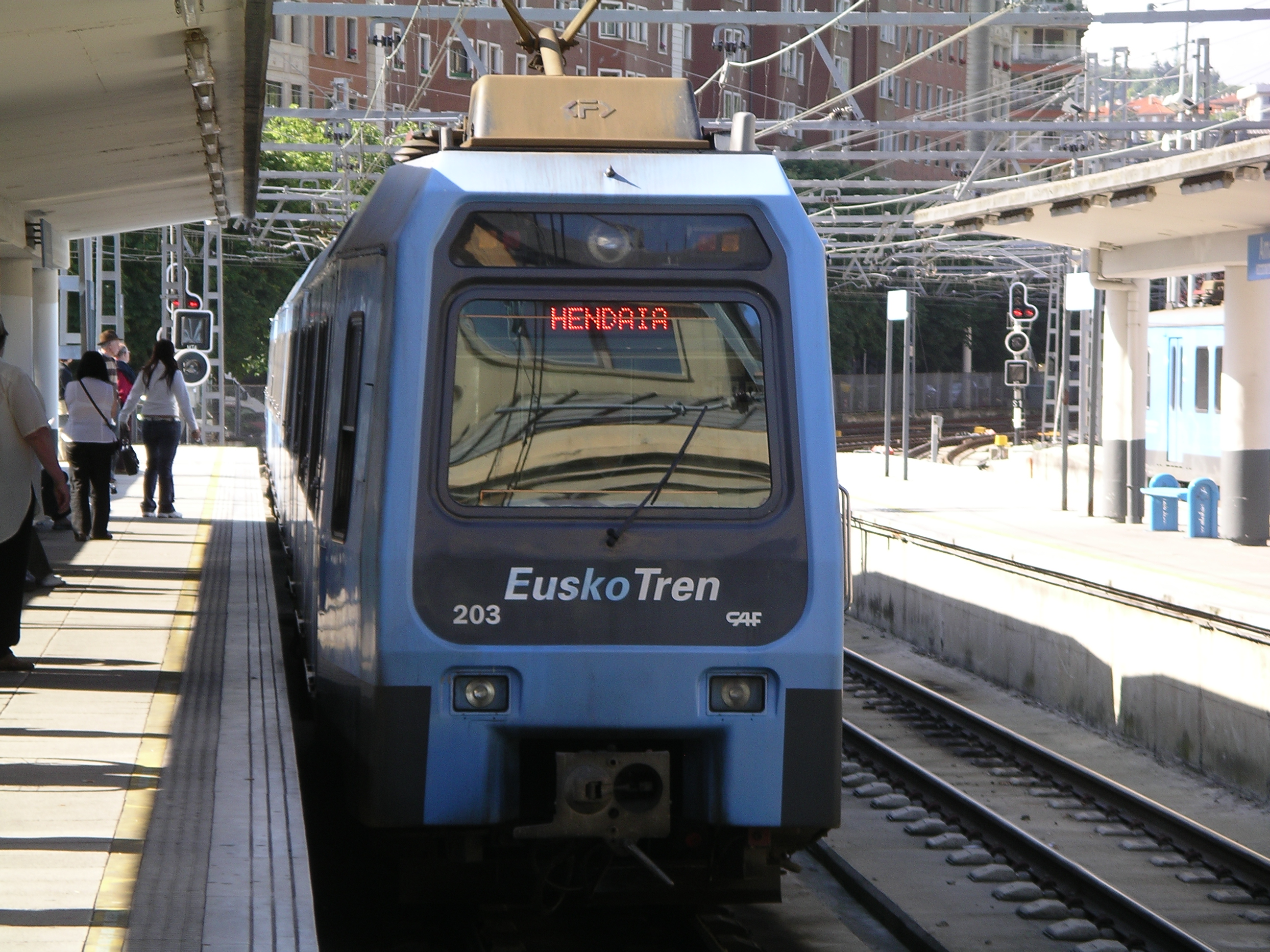
Euskotren Trena unit at Amara station, Donostia-San Sebastián.

The Euskotren Trena service is operated by Euskotren in the railway network owned by Euskal Trenbide Sarea, in the Basque provinces of Biscay and Gipuzkoa. (Note: There's also a short stretch of track and a station in the Pyrénées-Atlantiques department of France.) The immediate predecessors were operated by FEVE and Ferrocarriles y Transportes Suburbanos. The infrastructure and service have since been improved into a modern commuter/regional rail system.

In Biscay, the network is structured around Line 3 of the metro, which is fed by suburban trains traveling beyond the metro line. These trains serve areas such as Txorierri, Busturialdea and Durangaldea; including towns such as Derio, Lezama, Amorebieta-Etxano, Gernika, Bermeo and Durango.

In Gipuzkoa, traffic is centered in the San Sebastián metropolitan area. The suburban network there is being gradually improved to rapid transit standards. There are also trains from San Sebastián to the coastal towns of Zarautz, Zumaia and Deba; and further inland to Elgoibar, Eibar and Ermua.

=== Lines ===
Euskotren Trena network map (includes the Euskotren Tranbia tram lines).

The Euskotren Trena network consists of the following lines:

- E1 line, from Matiko (in Bilbao) to Amara (in San Sebastián). It connects the capitals of Biscay and Gipuzkoa, while serving intermediate towns. Traffic is concentrated in the Bilbao-Durango, Ermua-Elgoibar and San Sebastián-Zumaia sections.
- E2 line, from Lasarte-Oria to Hendaye. It spans the San Sebastián metropolitan area, and is being improved to rapid transit standards.
  - E5 line, from Amara to Altza (both in San Sebastián). Functionally part of the former, it serves the Altza branch.
- E3 line, from Kukullaga (in Etxebarri) to Lezama. It serves the Txorierri valley in Biscay.
  - E3a line, from Lutxana (in Erandio) to Sondika. A short shuttle connecting the former line with Line 1 of the Bilbao Metro.
- E4 line, from Matiko (in Bilbao) to Bermeo. It serves the Busturialdea area of Biscay. It shares tracks with line E1 up to Amorebieta.
- Larreineta funicular, in Valle de Trápaga-Trapagaran.
- Line 3 of the Bilbao Metro. Used by through-running trains of the E1, E3 and E4 lines to reach the center of Bilbao.

=== Former or closed lines ===
- Sections of the Txorierri line. The railway service on the Txorierri line between Casco Viejo and Deusto was suspended in May 2010 for a period of three years, because of the construction of Line 3 of the Bilbao Metro. The closed stations are Deusto, Unibertsitatea, Matiko and Zumalakarregi. The Loruri-Ciudad Jardín station, formerly closed, was open to provide a service to the users of the now closed stations.
- Urola line. The Urola line, formerly served by the Urola Railway, was closed by Eusko Trenbideak in 1986, after a futile attempt to renovate it. The service was replaced by a bus line between the municipalities of Zumaia and Zumarraga.
- Bilbao–Plentzia line. Bilbao–Plentzia was the line with the most users at the time of its closure. The original line connected downtown Bilbao, starting at Zazpikaleak/Casco Viejo station with the town of Plentzia, at Plentzia station. During the construction of the Line 1 of the Bilbao Metro, it was decided that the section between San Inazio and Plentzia would be managed by Metro Bilbao, as part of Line 1, instead of Euskotren. The Zazpikaleak/Casco Viejo station was then connected to the Txorierri line, and the Ciudad Jardín and Mallona stations were closed (due their proximity to the station in Casco Viejo). The Deusto–San Inazio section was eventually closed due to the construction of a new highway where the railway tracks were located.
- Lutxana–Sondika line. The line between Sondika and Lutxana (in Erandio), both in the Greater Bilbao area was closed in 1996 after an attempt to re-open it for passenger services. However, the tracks are still in use; Euskotren Trena uses it for testing new units.

=== Service frequencies ===
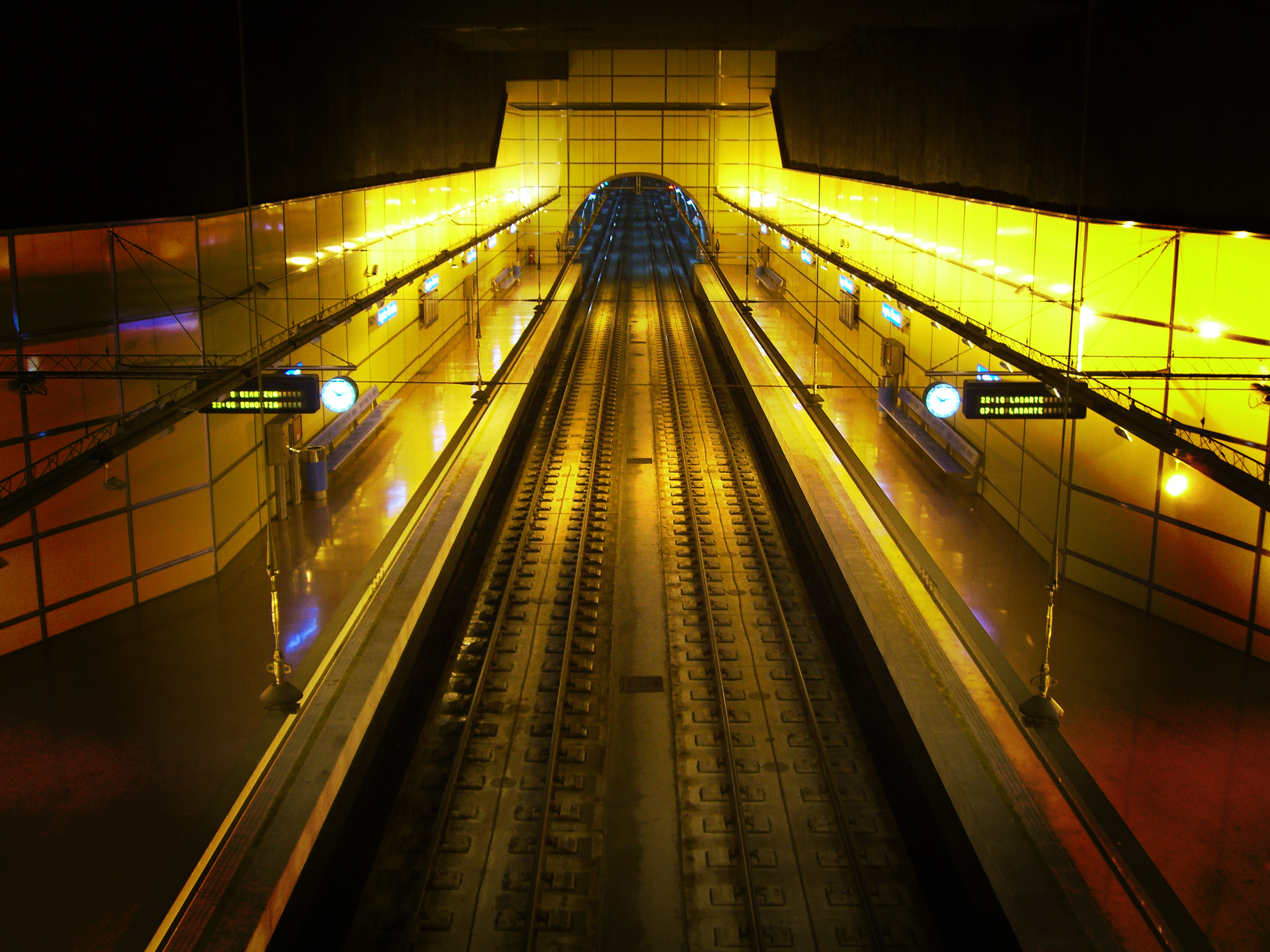
Lugaritz station

As of January 2014, typical services frequencies for weekdays are:

- Bilbao–Donostia line – one train per hour between Bilbao-Atxuri and Donostia-Amara.
- Durangaldea line – two trains per hour between Bilbao-Atxuri and Ermua in each direction, with one continuing to Donostia-Amara, and some express trains between Bilbao and Durango, Traña and Zaldibar.
- Kostaldea line – one train per hour between Ermua and Donostia-Amara in each direction (the ones starting at Donostia-Amara continuing to Bilbao-Atxuri).
- Tranbia Ermua–Eibar line – four trains per hour between Ermua and Eibar in each direction.
- Topo line – four trains per hour between Lasarte-Oria and Irun, with two continuing to Hendaye. Two trains per hour between Hendaye and Lasarte-Oria.
- Urdaibai line – two trains per hour between Bilbao-Atxuri and Bermeo in each direction and four express trains per day between Bilbao and Gernika.
- Txorierri line – two trains per hour between Casco Viejo and Lezama in each direction. Three trains per hour during peak times.
- Larreineta funicular – one funicular per hour between Larreineta and Escontrilla. Two per hour during peak times.

== Current operations ==
Euskotren, which operates the Euskotren Trena brand has its central offices in the Bilbao-Atxuri Station, in the district of Ibaiondo, in Bilbao. There are operations centres in several stations, including those of Durango and Donostia-San Sebastián. Currently, the rolling stock is maintained at depots in Abadiño, Gernika and Errenteria. New depots are being built in Irun.

=== Ticketing ===
Euskotren Trena uses both regular paper tickets and the Barik card available only on some lines. Users can acquire single tickets and return tickets at the vending machines available at every station, and monthly and yearly travel cards are also available. Young people and elderly people also may acquire special tickets. The Barik travel ticket was initially only available on the Txorierri line, and it will be available for use on all lines once it is fully implemented.

The ticket pricing is based on zone-based rules.

== Rolling stock ==
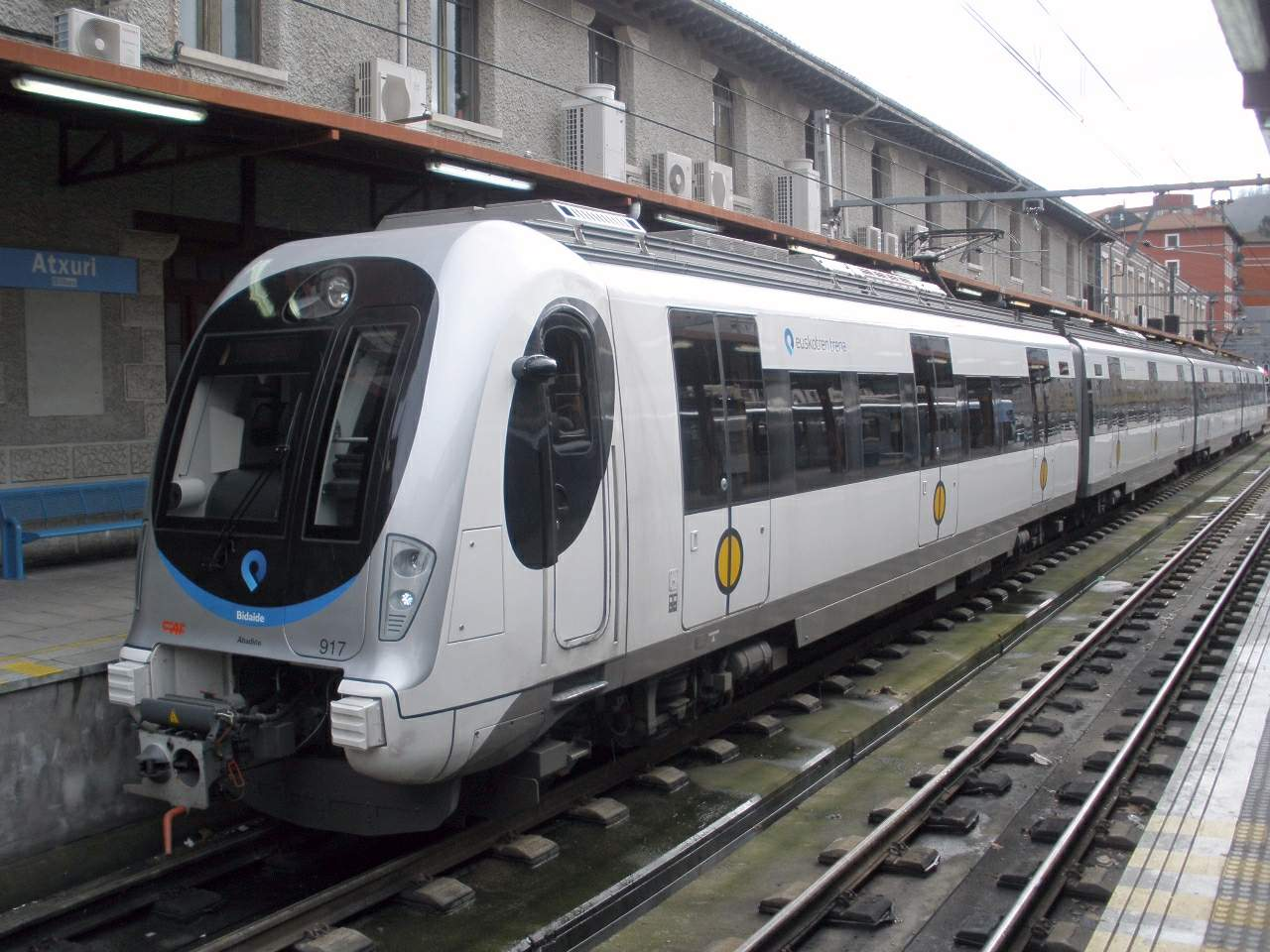
A 900 series train.

Euskotren Trena operates a fleet of 62 electric multiple units (EMU), all built by CAF. The 900 and 950 series, two of the train types currently operating, are similar but feature a different number of cars. They entered service between 2011 and 2018, replacing the older 200, 300 and 3500 series trains.

These train types themselves had been built in the 1970s and 1980s to replace the rolling stock inherited from Ferrocarriles Vascongados and Ferrocarriles y Transportes Suburbanos, with some of the older trains having dating from the 1920s.

In 2023, four new 940 series units were received from CAF. These were ordered by Euskotren to increase passenger capacity on the Donostia/San Sebastián Topo and in anticipation of the new metro loop that will be opened by the end of 2026. The 940 series is an improved and longer version of the 950 series, with one carriage being added.

By the end of 2026, five units of the 980 series, an improved version of the 940 series, will be added to the fleet. This will raise the total number of trains to 67.

=== Livery ===
The new rolling stock (900 and 950 series trains) is painted with the new Euskotren Trena livery, white with black contrast and blue and orange circles in the doors. The previous livery (used since 2002) had trains painted in solid blue, with white text.

== Current developments ==
The developments of the network operated by Euskotren, under the commercial brand of Euskotren Trena, are being conducted by Euskal Trenbide Sarea, which has control of the Basque railway network. The developments do not include any expansion of the lines or new lines (those not yet proposed or planned) but the improvements of the current network, with new stations, alternate routes and a second rail track in areas where there is only one, as well as the elimination, or at least reduction, of all the level crossings.

- Euba-Iurreta section. The section between Euba, in Amorebieta-Etxano and Iurreta is currently being upgraded to include a second track, in order to improve frequencies and eliminate ten level crossings. This development is part of the Durango+ project, which aims to improve the service and frequencies in the Durangaldea region. It was scheduled to be finished in 2013.
- Iurreta-Durango-Abadiño section. The section immediately after Euba-Iurreta is the Iurreta-Durango-Abadiño section, which is being constructed underground, in order to eliminate the level crossings and tracks that go through Durango and Abadiño. Two new stations will emanate from this project: an underground station for Durango to replace the current overground one and the Fauste Landako station and a semi-underground station for the neighbourhood of Matiena, in Abadiño (also replacing the current one). The Durango depot will be moved to new facilities in Lebario, Abadiño. It was expected to be finished in 2013.
- Abadiño-Berriz section. The section between Abadiño and Berriz is being renewed in order to add a second rail track. This section includes the new depot and offices at Lebario, and a new train station in Berriz.
- Eibar-Elgoibar section. The section between Eibar and Elgoibar is being completely renewed with:
  - A new station in Eibar, at a cost of €200,000 which replaces the whole station with the addition of lifts, removal of level crossings and the incorporation of new platforms.
  - Txarakua-Azitain section. The incorporation of a second rail track to improve frequency of trains. It was scheduled to be opened in late 2012.

== See also ==
- Bilbao rail network
