= Lasarte-Oria station =

Railway station in Lasarte-Oria, Basque Country, Spain

Lasarte-Oria
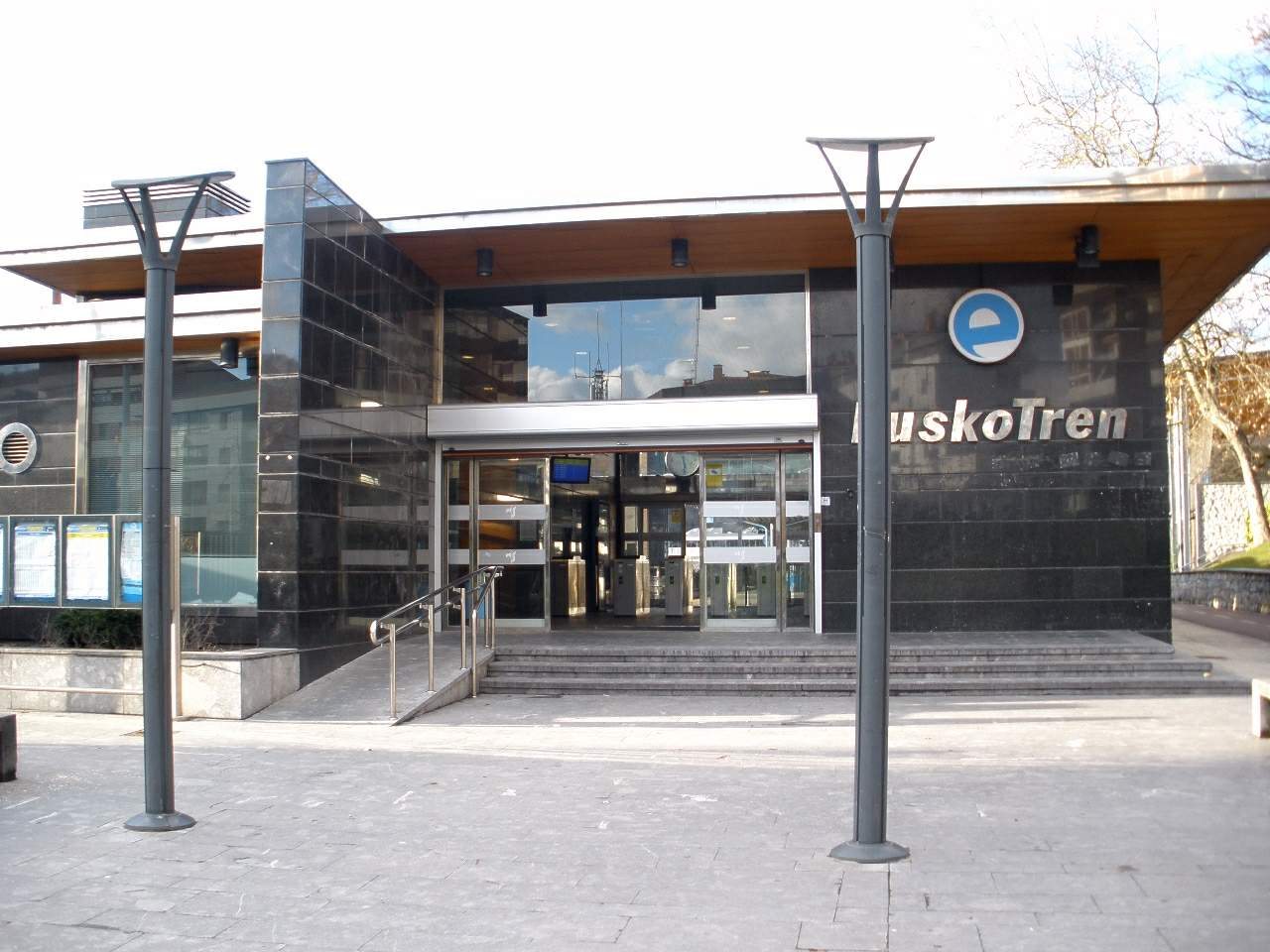
- Entrance to the station

General information
- Location: Lasarte-Oria, Gipuzkoa; Spain
- Coordinates: 43°16′15″N 2°01′12″W
- Owner: Euskal Trenbide Sarea
- Operator: Euskotren
- Line: Line T1
- Platforms: 1 island platform
- Tracks: 2

Construction
- Structure type: At-grade
- Parking: No
- Accessible: Yes

History
- Opened: 9 October 1998

Services
Preceding station	Euskotren Trena	Following station
Terminus	Line T1	Errekalde towards Hendaia
Location

Lasarte-Oria is a railway station in Lasarte-Oria, Basque Country, Spain. It is owned by Euskal Trenbide Sarea and operated by Euskotren. It lies on a branch of the Bilbao-San Sebastián line and is served by the suburban Topo service.

== History ==
The station opened in 1998 as the southern terminus of a short branch from the Bilbao-San Sebastián mainline. It substituted a halt situated on the aforementioned line, and brought the train closer to the main population center of the town.

== Services ==
The station is served by Euskotren Trena line E2. It runs every 15 minutes (in each direction) during weekdays, and every 30 minutes during weekends.
