= Euskal Trenbide Sarea =

Railway infrastructure manager in the Basque Country, Spain

Euskal Trenbide Sarea/Red Ferroviaria Vasca
- Company type: Government-owned
- Founded: 21 May 2004
- Headquarters: 8 San Vicente Street, Bilbao, Biscay, Spain
- Area served: Basque Country
- Key people: Ernesto Martínez de Cabredo (CEO)
- Owner: Basque Government
- Number of employees: 274 (2019)
- Website: www.ets-rfv.euskadi.eus/inicio/

Euskal Trenbide Sarea (Basque for 'Basque Railway Network', Spanish: Red Ferroviaria Vasca), commonly known by its acronym ETS, is a railway infrastructure manager operating in the Basque Country, Spain. The company was formed in 2004, but the railway infrastructure it operates was transferred from Euskotren in 2006. It is a member of the International Union of Railways.

The company owns the network in which Euskotren operates (including the Irauregi–Lutxana and Ariz–Basurto freight lines), as well as the infrastructure of the Bilbao and Vitoria-Gasteiz tram systems. It also shares the ownership of Lines 1 and 2 of the Bilbao Metro with the Biscay Transport Consortium. The company is also building the Gipuzkoan branch of the Basque Y high-speed line under an agreement with ADIF.
