= Luis María Echeberría =

Spanish footballer

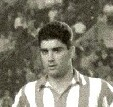
- Echeberría with Athletic Bilbao in 1965

Personal information
- Full name: Luis María Echeberría Igartua
- Date of birth: 24 March 1940
- Place of birth: Asua, Spain
- Date of death: 19 October 2016 (aged 76)
- Place of death: Las Arenas, Spain
- Height: 1.75 m (5 ft 9 in)
- Position: Defender

Youth career
- Getxo

Senior career*
Years	Team	Apps	(Gls)
1958–1960	Getxo		
1960–1961	Basconia	38	(0)
1961–1972	Athletic Bilbao	259	(1)
1972–1973	Barakaldo	9	(0)
Total		306+	(1+)

International career
1961	Spain B	1	(0)
1962–1963	Spain	4	(0)
- * Club domestic league appearances and goals

Luis María "Koldo" Echeberría Igartua (24 March 1940 – 19 October 2016) was a Spanish footballer who played as a defender.

== Club career ==
Born in Asua, Biscay, Echeberría signed for Athletic Bilbao in 1961 at the age of 21 from Basque Country neighbours CD Basconia, at that time still not the club's farm team. He made his first-team – and La Liga – debut on 10 September 1961 in a 2–1 away loss against Sevilla FC, and finished his debut season with 29 league appearances (out of a possible 30) as his team finished fifth.

In the following years, Echeberría would be part of a legendary Athletic defence that also featured José Ángel Iribar in goal, Jesús Aranguren and Iñaki Sáez, helping the Lions to the 1969 Copa del Generalísimo and appearing in 341 competitive games until his departure. He retired in 1973 aged 33, after one season with Barakaldo CF in the Segunda División.

== International career ==
Echeberría earned four caps for Spain in 11 months. His debut came on 6 June 1962 as the national team lost 2–1 to Brazil at Viña del Mar in that year's FIFA World Cup, in a group-stage exit.

== Honours ==
Athletic Bilbao

- Copa del Generalísimo: 1969; runner-up: 1965–66, 1966–67
