= Lamiako (Bilbao Metro) =

Rapid transit station in Leioa, Basque Country, Spain

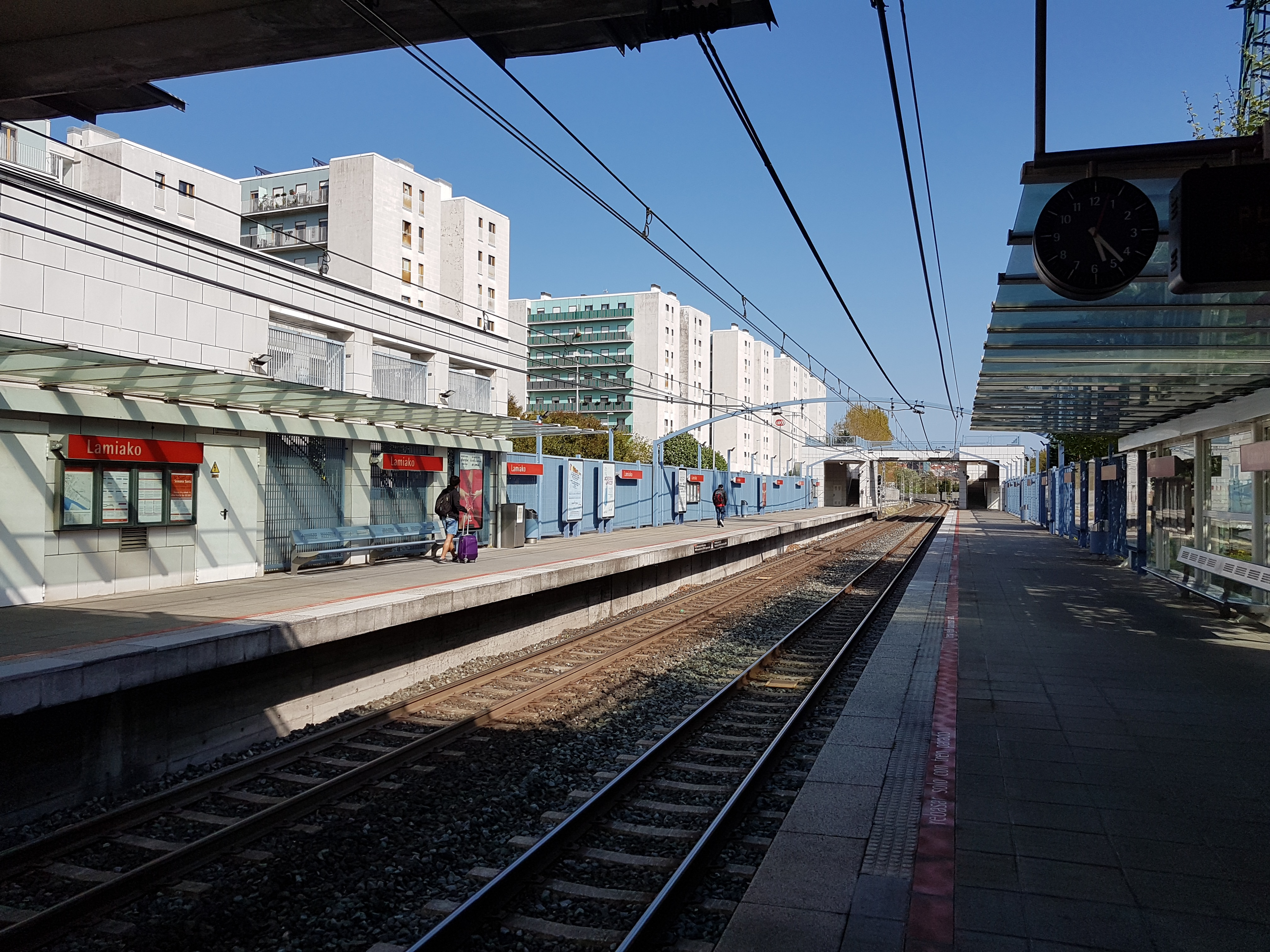
- Platforms

General information
- Location: 1 Langileria St. 48940 Leioa; Spain
- Coordinates: 43°19′17″N 3°00′04″W
- Owner: Biscay Transport Consortium; Euskal Trenbide Sarea
- Line: Line 1
- Platforms: 2 side platforms
- Tracks: 2
- Connections: Bus

Construction
- Structure type: At-grade
- Platform levels: 1
- Parking: No
- Accessible: Yes

Other information
- Fare zone: Zone 2

History
- Opened: 1 July 1887
- Rebuilt: 11 November 1995

Passengers
- 2021: 250,880

Services
Preceding station	Metro Bilbao	Following station
Areeta towards Plentzia	Line 1	Leioa towards Etxebarri
Location

Lamiako is a station on Line 1 of the Bilbao Metro. It is located in the neighborhood of Lamiako, in the municipality of Leioa. The station opened as part of the metro on 11 November 1995, replacing an older station.

== History ==
The station, then known as Lamiaco, first opened to the public in 1887 as part of the Bilbao-Las Arenas railway.

Starting in 1947, the narrow-gauge railway companies that operated within the Bilbao metropolitan area were merged to become Ferrocarriles y Transportes Suburbanos, shortened FTS and the first precedent of today's Bilbao Metro. In 1977, the FTS network was transferred to the public company FEVE and in 1982 to the recently created Basque Railways. In the 1980s it was decided the station, just like most of the former railway line, would be integrated into Line 1 of the metro. The old station building was demolished and new station opened as part of the metro network on 11 November 1995.

== Station layout ==
It is an at-grade, open-air station with two side platforms.

=== Access ===
- 1, Langileria street
- 1, Gabriel Aresti street
- Station's interior

== Services ==
The station is served by Line 1 from Etxebarri to Plentzia. The station is also served by local Leioabus and regional Bizkaibus bus services.

== Gallery ==
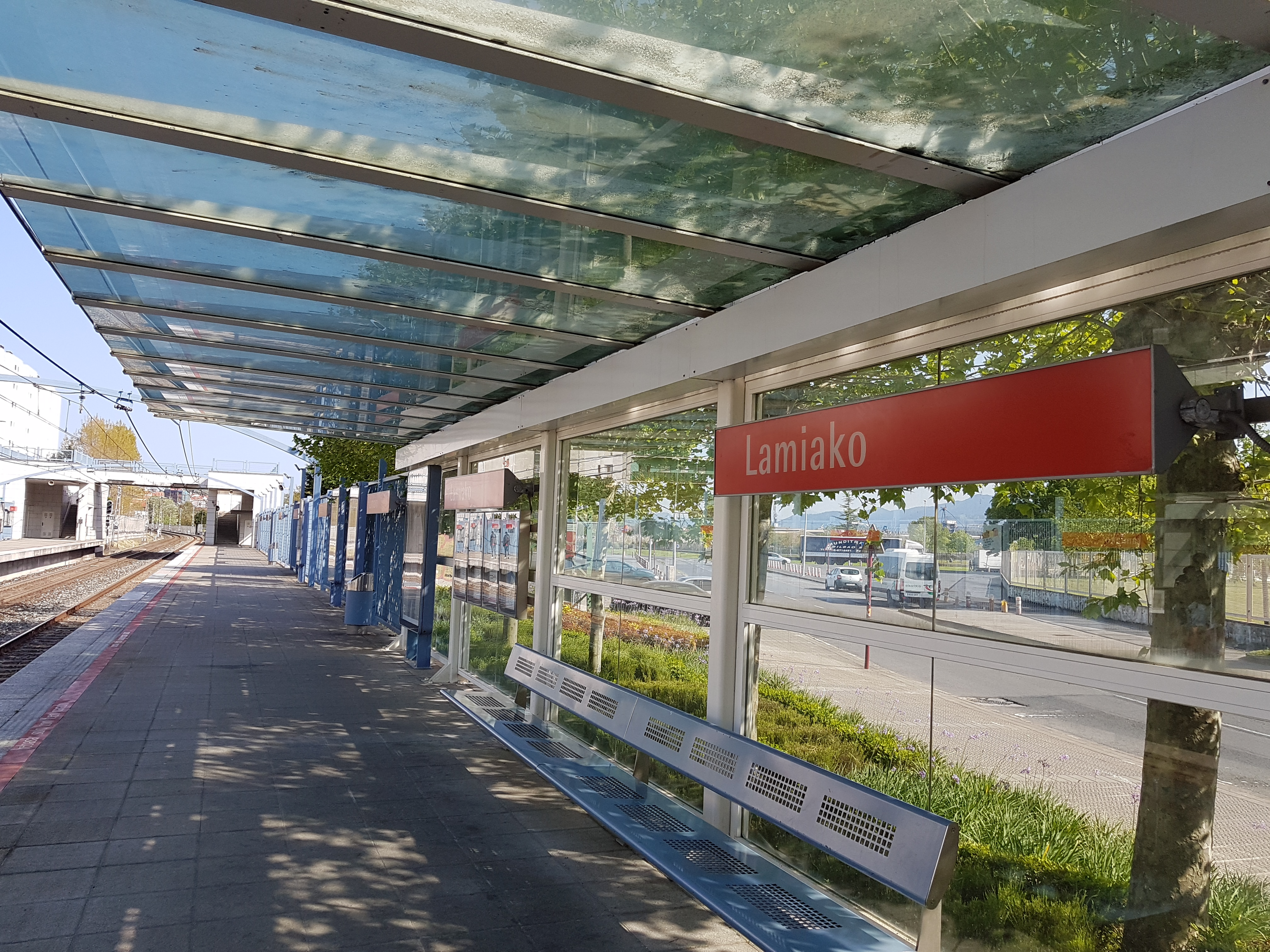
Detail of the platform

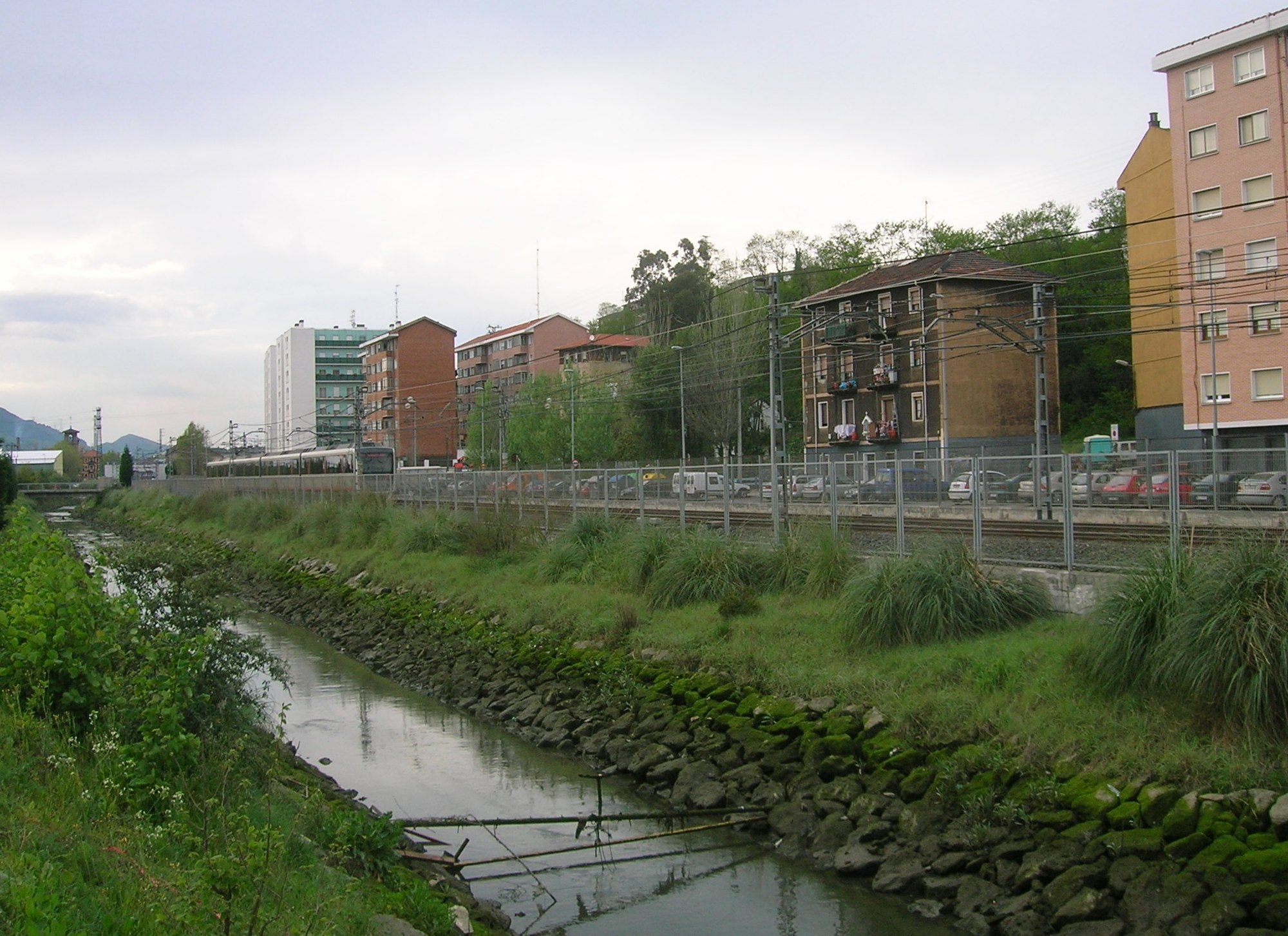
River Gobelas near to the station
