= Ola station =

Railway station in Sondika, Basque Country, Spain

Ola
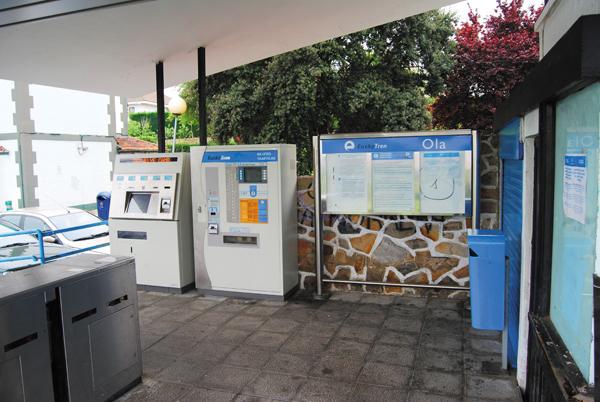
- Station entrance

General information
- Location: Sondika, Biscay; Spain
- Coordinates: 43°17′31″N 2°55′31″W
- Owner: Euskal Trenbide Sarea
- Operator: Euskotren
- Line: Line E3
- Platforms: 1 side platform
- Tracks: 1

Construction
- Structure type: At-grade
- Parking: No
- Accessible: Yes

Other information
- Fare zone: Zone 2

History
- Opened: 31 October 1908

Services
Preceding station	Euskotren Trena	Following station
Sondika towards Lezama	Line E3	Matiko towards Kukullaga
Location

Ola is a railway station in Sondika, Basque Country, Spain. It is owned by Euskal Trenbide Sarea and operated by Euskotren. It lies on the Txorierri line.

== History ==
The station was not part of the Txorierri line when it opened in 1894. Due to budget constraints, the original alignment through Mount Artxanda included prolonged steep slopes. This caused a serious accident only two months after the opening, after which the decision was taken to build a tunnel directly under the mountain. The station opened on 31 October 1908, as part of the new alignment between Bilbao and Lezama.

During the construction of Bilbao Metro Line 3, the old tunnel through Artxanda was closed. As a result, the only service calling at the station from November 2015 to April 2017 was a shuttle to and from Sondika. Together with the metro line, a new double-track tunnel was built under Artxanda parallel the one inaugurated in 1908; which now serves as an evacuation gallery for the new one. After the opening of Line 3 in April 2017, train service on the Txorierri line was completely restored, with its trains running through the new tunnel and the metro line.

If the long-planned railway line to the airport is built, the station will be rebuilt at a different location as part of a new alignment between Ola and Sondika that will remove the need to reverse at the latter station.

== Services ==
The station is served by Euskotren Trena line E3. It runs every 15 minutes (in each direction) during weekdays, and every 30 minutes during weekends.
