= Astrabudua (Bilbao Metro) =

Rapid transit station in Erandio, Basque Country, Spain

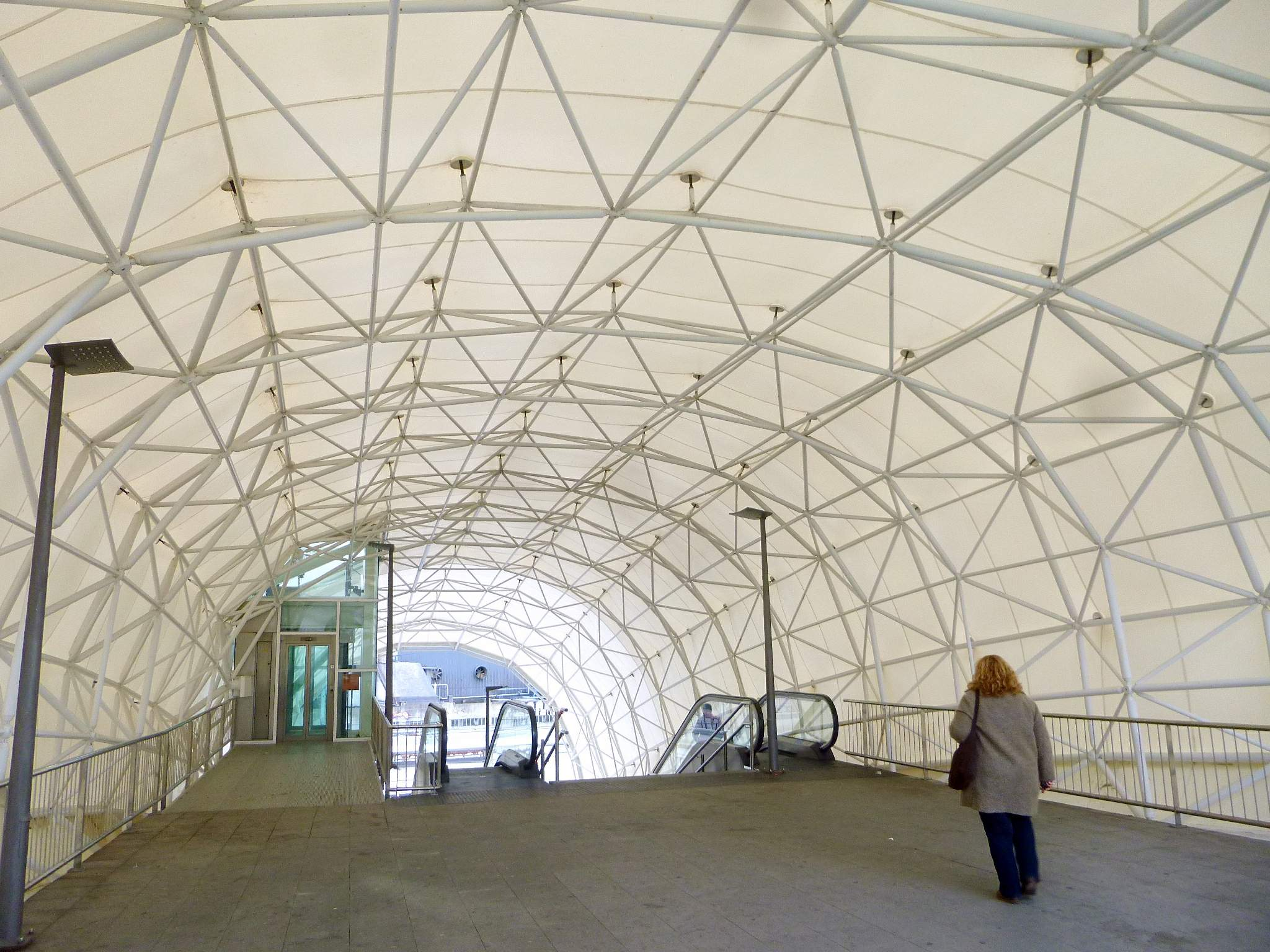
- Station hall

General information
- Location: 27, Polígono Industrial Axpe; 48950 Erandio; Spain
- Coordinates: 43°18′53″N 2°59′13″W
- Owner: Biscay Transport Consortium; Euskal Trenbide Sarea
- Line: Line 1
- Platforms: 2 side platforms
- Tracks: 2
- Connections: Bus

Construction
- Structure type: At-grade
- Platform levels: 1
- Parking: Yes
- Accessible: Yes

Other information
- Fare zone: Zone 2

History
- Opened: 1 July 1887
- Rebuilt: 11 November 1995

Passengers
- 2021: 1,021,886

Services
Preceding station	Metro Bilbao	Following station
Leioa towards Plentzia	Line 1	Erandio towards Etxebarri
Location

Astrabudua is a station on Line 1 of the Bilbao Metro. It is located in the neighborhood of the same name, in the municipality of Erandio. The station opened as part of the metro on 11 November 1995, replacing an older station. It is located next to a fare-free parking.

== History ==
The station, then known as Axpe, first opened to the public in 1887 as part of the Bilbao-Las Arenas railway.

Starting in 1947, the narrow-gauge railway companies that operated within the Bilbao metropolitan area were merged to become Ferrocarriles y Transportes Suburbanos, shortened FTS and the first precedent of today's Bilbao Metro. In 1977, the FTS network was transferred to the public company FEVE and in 1982 to the recently created Basque Railways. In the 1980s it was decided the station, just like most of the former railway line, would be integrated into Line 1 of the metro. The new station opened as part of the metro network on 11 November 1995.

== Station layout ==
It is an at-grade station with two side platforms. This station has the distinct feature of requiring exiting the station in order to change platforms.

=== Access ===
- 2, Etxegorri St.
- Madaripe road
- 27, Ribera de Axpe St.
- 2, Etxegorri

== Services ==
The station is served by Line 1 from Etxebarri to Plentzia. The station is also served by local E! Busa local and regional Bizkaibus bus services.
