= Bilbao British Cemetery =

Cemetery in Sondika, Biscay, Spain

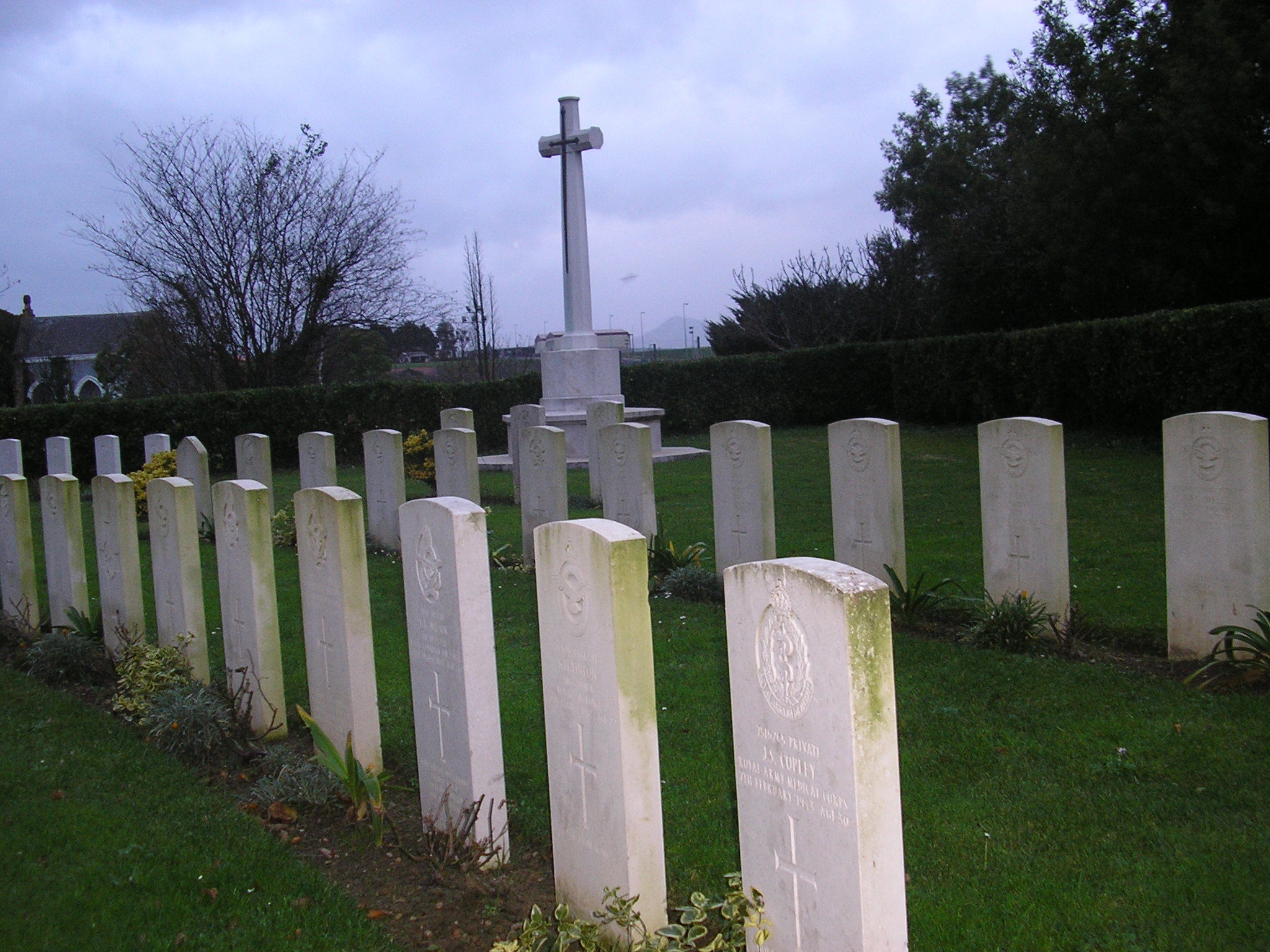
- Bilbao British Cemetery
- Interactive map of Bilbao British Cemetery

Details
- Established: 1775 / 1929
- Location: Sondika, Biscay
- Country: Spain
- Coordinates: 43.2980°N 2.9135°W
- Type: British
- No. of graves: ±58
- Website: Cemetery details. Commonwealth War Graves Commission.
- Find a Grave: Bilbao British Cemetery

Bilbao British Cemetery is located in Sondika, in the province of Biscay, in the autonomous community of the Basque Country, northern Spain. The British cemetery was originally located on the coast of Biscay from about 1775, before being disaffected and relocated to its current position in 1929.

== Commonwealth War Graves ==
The cemetery contains a Commonwealth War Graves plot (maintained by the Commonwealth War Graves Commission) with 58 casualties, many reburials from other cemeteries in the region where permanent maintenance could not be assured. These casualties include servicemen from Poland, as well as persons from the United Kingdom and the Commonwealth of Nations. Service personnel from both the Royal Navy and Royal Air Force are buried here. Most of the dead are from World War II, there are also four graves and three special memorials (to those whose graves elsewhere were lost) of British service personnel of World War I.

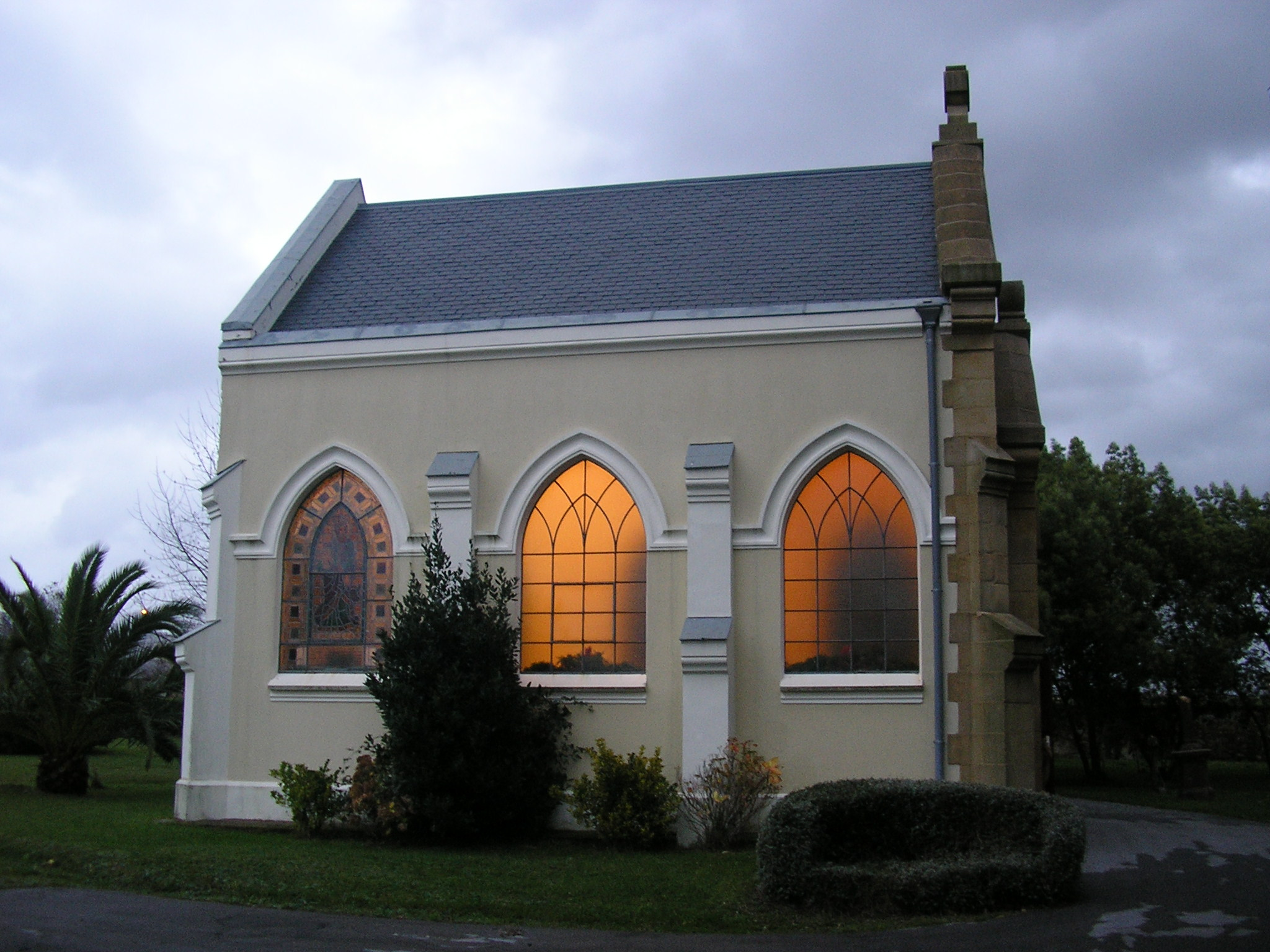
The British Church, Bilbao

There is also a British merchant seaman of World War I who was reburied among the civilian graves in Plot G.

== Location ==
The cemetery can be found on the main road out of Sondika towards Derio. The cemetery is set back from the road and is now hidden by new housing. A Remembrance Day service is held every year.
