= Carde y Escoriaza railcar =

Railcar in Basque Country, Spain

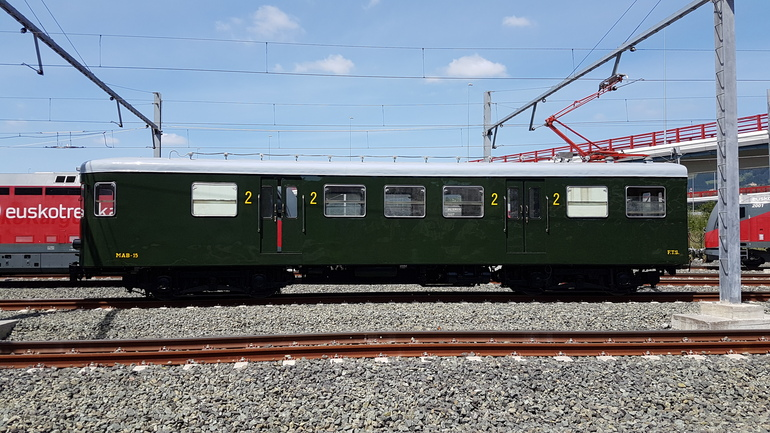
- The MAB 15 railcar after its 2016 restoration
- In service: 1929–2012
- Manufacturer: Carde y Escoriaza
- Built at: Zaragoza, Spain
- Constructed: 1927–1930
- Number built: 15
- Number preserved: 2
- Fleet numbers: MAB 1–12; MD 1–3 (later MAB 13–15)
- Operators: Bilbao-Plentzia railway; FTS; FEVE; Euskotren; Metro Bilbao, S.A.; ETS

Specifications
- Train length: 16.25 m (53 ft 4 in)
- Wheel diameter: 850 mm (2 ft 9 in)
- Weight: 35,480 kilograms (78,220 lb) (MAB 5); 32,800 kilograms (72,300 lb) (MAB 15)
- Traction motors: 4
- Power output: 416 hp (310 kW)
- Electric system: 1,500 V DC overhead line
- Current collection: Pantograph
- UIC classification: Bo′Bo′
- Track gauge: 1,000 mm (3 ft 3 3/8 in)

The Carde y Escoriaza railcar is a railcar train type formerly operated in the Basque Country, Spain. They were introduced in the Bilbao-Plentzia railway in 1927, and were later operated by Ferrocarriles y Transportes Suburbanos, Euskotren, Metro Bilbao, S.A. and Euskal Trenbide Sarea until 2012.

== History ==
The Bilbao-Plentzia railway was electrified in 1927. That year, the company acquired eight unpowered cars and three powered railcars. The railcars were built by Carde y Escoriaza in Zaragoza, while the bogies and electric components were manufactured by Brill and AEG respectively. When delivered, the railcars had 18 first-class and 32 second-class seats, the only preserved unrefurbished unit has 32 second-class seats and room for 120 standing passengers. Each axis was powered by a 76 kW (102 hp) engine, with current supplied by two pantographs. A fifth 3.2 kW (4.3 hp) engine powered a pump for the vacuum brakes.

A total of twelve passenger railcars (numbered MAB 1–12) were eventually built, entering service in 1929. Another three railcars (numbered MD 1–3) were built to the same technical specifications, but they were configured for freight transport. All passenger railcars, with the exception of MAB 5, were eventually refurbished with metal bodies replacing the original ones made of teak wood. The freight railcars were also refurbished with metal bodies and converted for passenger service in the 1950s, they were concurrently renumbered MAB 13–15. Their original wooden bodies were used to refurbish three Allsthom railcars acquired from the Toulouse-Castres railway, which took over the MD 1–3 numbering.

By the 1960s the railcars were relegated to the Txorierri and Lutxana–Mungia lines. With the introduction of 200 series trains in 1986 the MAB 5 unit was retired from active passenger service. It remained in service as an auxiliary train until 1995, when it was retired and transferred to the Basque Railway Museum for preservation. The MAB 2 and 13 units were refurbished with new electrical equipment in 1990 and started operating the Lutxana–Sondika shuttle in July that year. They were transferred to Metro Bilbao, S.A. in 1996, which used them as service trains until their scrapping in 2011. The MAB 15 unit was retired from passenger service in 1994, and the next year it was converted into a service train. It remained in service under Euskotren and ETS until its definitive retirement in 2012. It was restored in 2016 to the appearance it had between the 1960s and the 1990s.

== See also ==
- Ferrocarriles y Transportes Suburbanos § Rolling stock
