= Larrondo station =

Railway station in Loiu, Basque Country, Spain

Larrondo
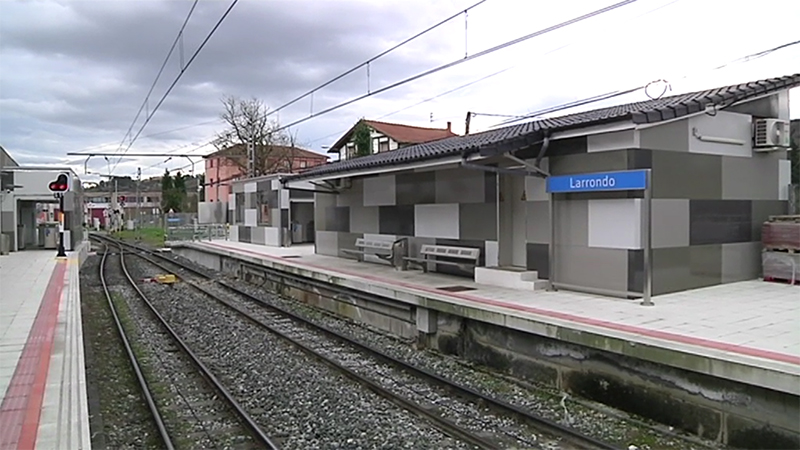
- View of the station after the 2018 renovation

General information
- Location: Loiu, Biscay; Spain
- Coordinates: 43°17′39″N 2°54′56″W
- Owner: Euskal Trenbide Sarea
- Operator: Euskotren
- Line: Line E3
- Platforms: 2 side platforms
- Tracks: 2

Construction
- Structure type: At-grade
- Parking: No
- Accessible: Yes

Other information
- Fare zone: Zone 2

History
- Opened: 31 October 1908

Services
Preceding station	Euskotren Trena	Following station
Elotxelerri towards Lezama	Line E3	Sondika towards Kukullaga
Location

Larrondo is a railway station in Loiu, Basque Country, Spain. It is owned by Euskal Trenbide Sarea and operated by Euskotren. It lies on the Txorierri line.

== History ==
The station was not part of the Txorierri line when it opened in 1894. Due to budget constraints, the original alignment through Mount Artxanda included prolonged steep slopes. This caused a serious accident only two months after the opening, after which the decision was taken to build a tunnel directly under the mountain. The station opened on 31 October 1908, as part of the new alignment between Bilbao and Lezama.

The station was renovated in 2018 after trains on the Txorierri line started running through metro Line 3.

== Services ==
The station is served by Euskotren Trena line E3. It runs every 15 minutes (in each direction) during weekdays, and every 30 minutes during weekends.
