= Lutxana station =

Rapid transit and commuter rail station in Erandio, Basque Country, Spain

Lutxana
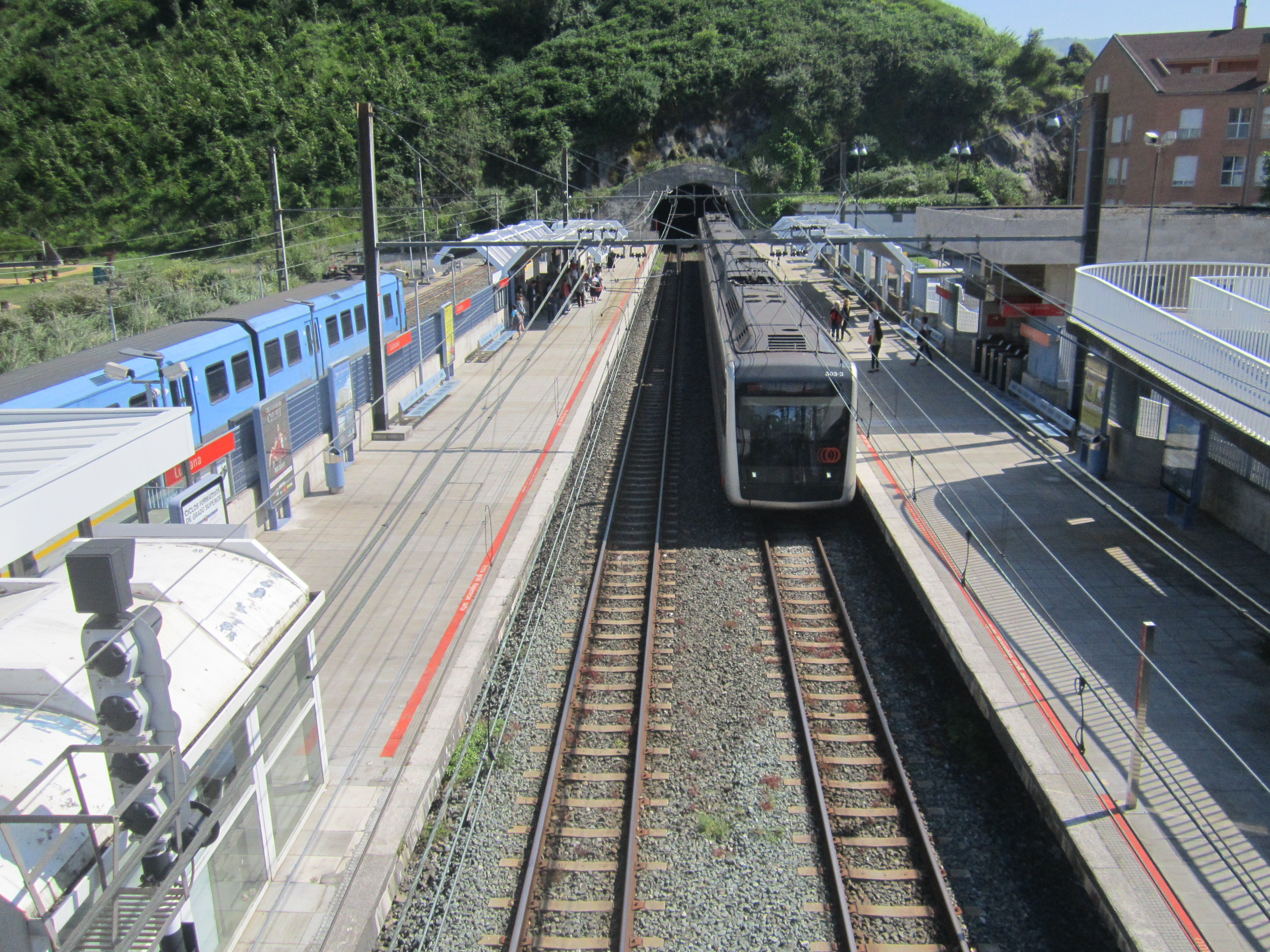
- Station overview

General information
- Location: 16 San José Lutxana, Erandio; Spain
- Coordinates: 43°17′28″N 2°58′12″W
- Owner: Biscay Transport Consortium; Euskal Trenbide Sarea
- Lines: Line 1; Line E3a
- Platforms: 3 side platforms
- Tracks: 3
- Connections: Bus

Construction
- Structure type: At-grade
- Platform levels: 1
- Parking: No
- Accessible: Yes

Other information
- Fare zone: Zone 2

History
- Opened: 1 July 1887
- Rebuilt: 11 November 1995
Location

Lutxana is a station on Line 1 of the Bilbao Metro and the Lutxana–Sondika line operated by Euskotren Trena. It is located in the neighbourhood of Lutxana-Enekuri, in the municipality of Erandio. In its current inception, the station was opened on 11 November 1995. Euskotren Trena suburban trains began serving the station in 2015.

The Cercanías Bilbao commuter railway network (operated by Renfe) has Lutxana-Barakaldo railway station on its C1/C2 line, but they are not at the same location or even in the same municipality – there is a relatively short distance of about 700 metres (770 yd) between them as the crow flies, but they are situated on opposite banks of the Estuary of Bilbao (the 'other' Lutxana is part of Barakaldo).

== History ==
The station, originally named Luchana, opened in 1887 as part of the Bilbao–Las Arenas railway, which connected the city of Bilbao with the neighborhood of Las Arenas, today Areeta, in Getxo. The station previous station to the south was San Ignacio, and the next to the north Desierto-Erandio.

In 1893, the station became the western terminus of the Luchana–Munguia railway, connecting Erandio with the town of Mungia across the Asua valley. A depot was established close to the station across the Asua river. In 1947 both railway companies were merged into Ferrocarriles y Transportes Suburbanos, FTS for short, which started the work of electrification of both lines as well as the first renovation of the station. In 1975 the Lutxana–Mungia line was partially closed, but the stretch between Lutxana and Sondika remained operational. Passenger service between Lutxana and Sondika was suspended due to low demand in 1997.

In 1977, the FTS network was transferred to the public company FEVE and in 1982 to the recently created Basque Railways. After the transfer, it was announced that sections of the Bilbao–Plencia line would be renewed and converted into the first line of the Bilbao Metro. The new station was opened on 11 November 1995 as part of Line 1 of the metro. Concurrently, the station was renamed Lutxana following modern Basque orthographic conventions.

During the construction of metro Line 3, the old tunnel through Artxanda was closed. As a result, trains on the Txorierri line had to be provisionally rerouted from Lezama to Lutxana from November 2015 to April 2017. After the opening of Line 3 in April 2017, train service on the Txorierri line was completely restored, with its trains running through the new tunnel and the metro line. However, a limited service from Lutxana to Sondika was kept, on a provisional basis at first. It has stayed ever since, and the railroad has been renewed due to the construction of train parks in Erandio.

== Station layout ==
Lutxana is an at-grade open-air station with one side platform and one island platform. The central platform acts as two separate side platforms, as they are separated by a barrier. The platforms are connected by an overpass.

=== Access ===
- 16, San José St.
- 16, San José St.
- 25, San José St.
- 17, San José St.

== Services ==
The station is served by Line 1 to Etxebarri, Ibarbengoa and Plentzia. There are trains to Etxebarri and Ibarbengoa every five to ten minutes, and services to Plentzia every twenty minutes. The station is also served on weekdays by an hourly shuttle service (Line E3a) connecting Lutxana with Zangroiz and Sondika, operated by Euskotren. Bus stops near the station are served by Bizkaibus regional services.

Preceding station	Metro Bilbao	Following station
Erandio towards Plentzia	Line 1	San Ignazio towards Etxebarri
Preceding station	Euskotren Trena	Following station
Terminus	Line E3a	Zangroiz towards Sondika
