= Erandio (Bilbao Metro) =

Rapid transit station in Erandio, Basque Country, Spain

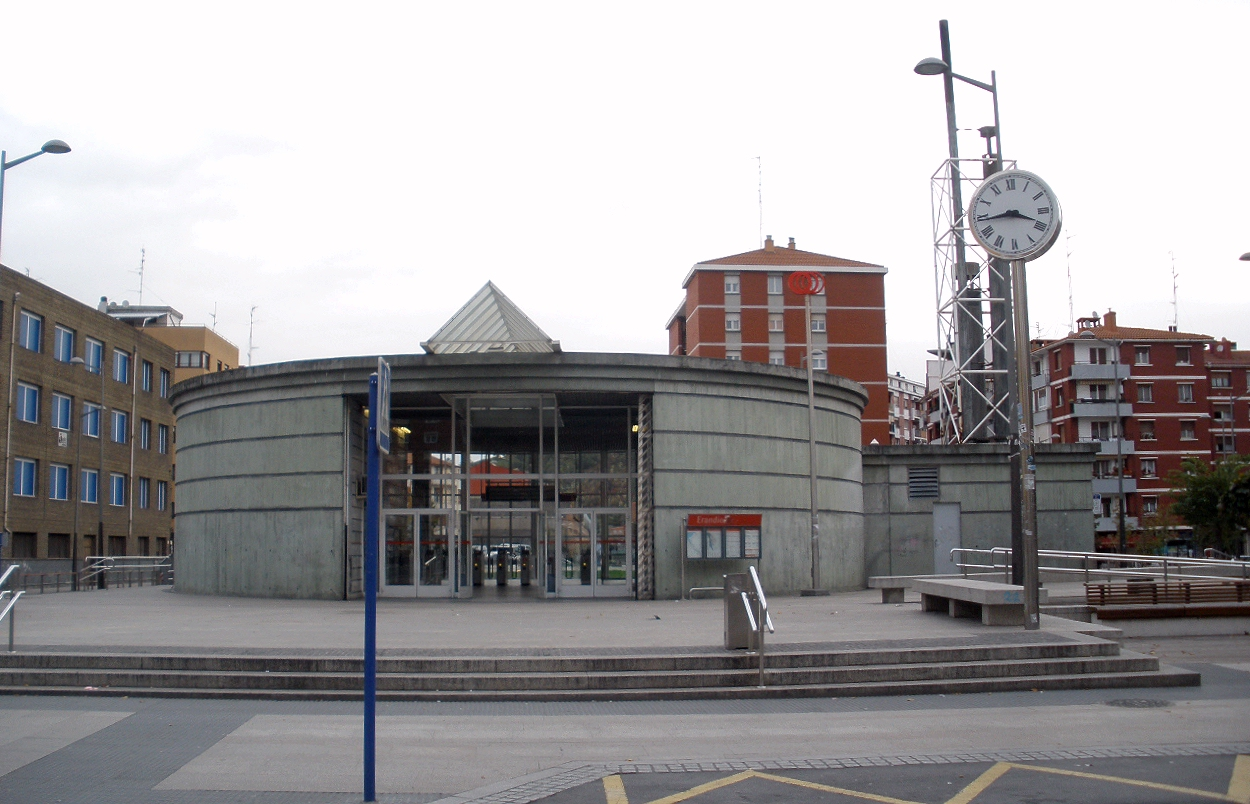
- Entrance to the station

General information
- Location: 2 Geltoki etorbidea 48950 Erandio; Spain
- Coordinates: 43°18′14″N 2°58′28″W
- Owner: Biscay Transport Consortium; Euskal Trenbide Sarea
- Line: Line 1
- Platforms: 2 side platforms
- Tracks: 2
- Connections: Bus

Construction
- Structure type: Underground
- Platform levels: 1
- Parking: No
- Accessible: Yes

Other information
- Fare zone: Zone 2

History
- Opened: 1 July 1887
- Rebuilt: 11 November 1995

Passengers
- 2021: 1,382,089

Services
Preceding station	Metro Bilbao	Following station
Astrabudua towards Plentzia	Line 1	Lutxana towards Etxebarri
Location

Erandio is a station on Line 1 of the Bilbao Metro. It is located in the neighborhood of Altzaga, in the municipality of Erandio. The station opened as part of the metro on 11 November 1995.

== History ==
The station, then known as Desierto-Erandio, first opened to the public in 1887 as part of the Bilbao-Las Arenas railway. The station was originally an open air station with two side platforms located in the middle of Erandio.

Starting in 1947, the narrow-gauge railway companies that operated within the Bilbao metropolitan area were merged to become Ferrocarriles y Transportes Suburbanos, shortened FTS and the first precedent of today's Bilbao Metro. In 1977, the FTS network was transferred to the public company FEVE and in 1982 to the recently created Basque Railways. In the 1980s it was decided the station, just like most of the former railway line, would be integrated into Line 1 of the metro. The station, then renamed to simply Erandio, was the first station of the former Bilbao-Plentzia railway to be put underground, as designed by Navarrese architect Francisco Javier Sáenz de Oiza. The new station opened as part of the metro network on 11 November 1995.

== Station layout ==
Erandio is an underground station with two side platforms. Given that its design and construction predate those of the rest of the network, it does not follow the typical cavern-like style shared by many of the other underground stations of the network.

=== Access ===
- 2, Geltoki etorbidea St. (Erandio exit)
- Station's interior

== Services ==
The station is served by Line 1 from Etxebarri to Plentzia. The station is also served by local E! Busa local and regional Bizkaibus bus services.
