= Leioa (Bilbao Metro) =

Rapid transit station in Leioa, Basque Country, Spain

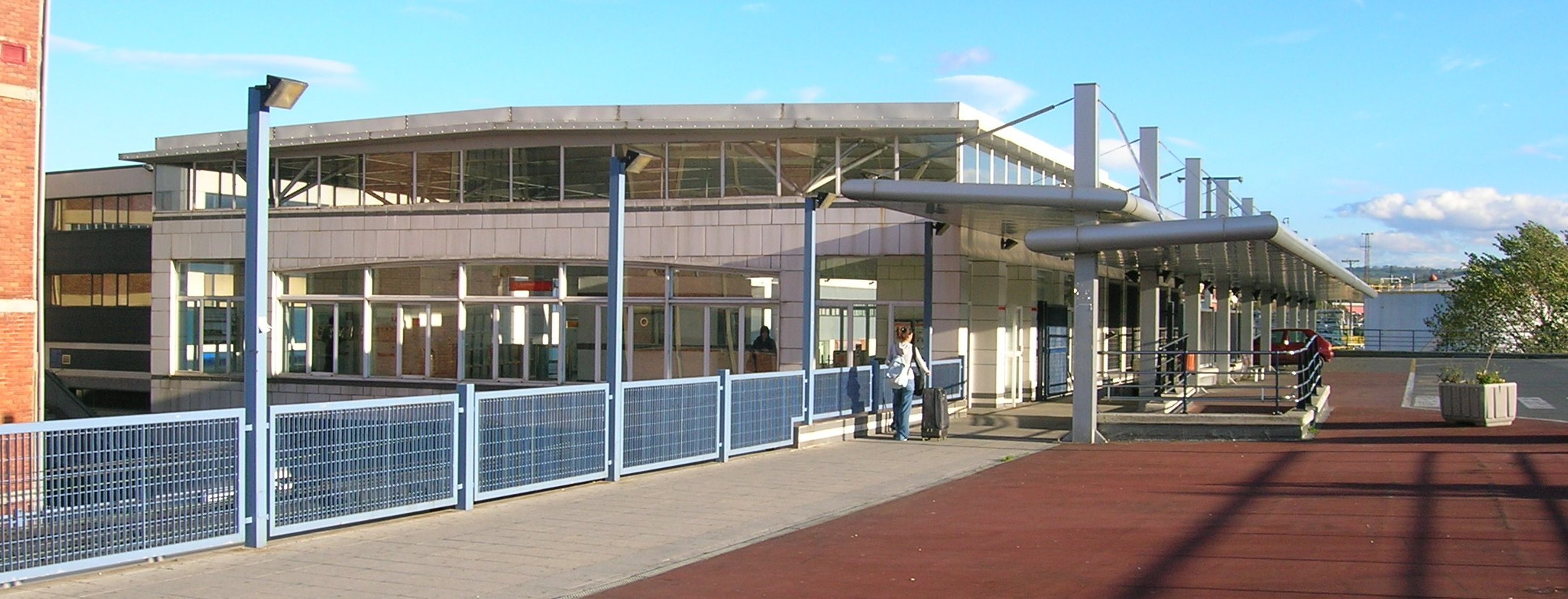
- View of the station

General information
- Location: 2 Sabino Arana St. 48940 Leioa; Spain
- Coordinates: 43°19′05″N 2°59′31″W
- Owner: Biscay Transport Consortium; Euskal Trenbide Sarea
- Line: Line 1
- Platforms: 2 side platforms
- Tracks: 2
- Connections: Bus

Construction
- Structure type: At-grade
- Platform levels: 1
- Parking: Yes
- Accessible: Yes

Other information
- Fare zone: Zone 2

History
- Rebuilt: 11 November 1995

Passengers
- 2021: 743,272

Services
Preceding station	Metro Bilbao	Following station
Lamiako towards Plentzia	Line 1	Astrabudua towards Etxebarri
Location

Leioa is a station on Line 1 of the Bilbao Metro. It is located in the neighborhood of Udondo, in the municipality of Leioa. The station opened as part of the metro on 11 November 1995, replacing an older station. It is located next to a park and ride facility.

== History ==
The station wasn't part of the Bilbao-Las Arenas railway when it opened in 1887. It was built in the mid-twentieth century as an infill station.

Starting in 1947, the narrow-gauge railway companies that operated within the Bilbao metropolitan area were merged to become Ferrocarriles y Transportes Suburbanos, shortened FTS and the first precedent of today's Bilbao Metro. In 1977, the FTS network was transferred to the public company FEVE and in 1982 to the recently created Basque Railways. In the 1980s it was decided the station, just like most of the former railway line, would be integrated into Line 1 of the metro. The new station opened as part of the metro network on 11 November 1995.

=== Future ===
In the decade of the 2000s, plans were conceived to create a new tram line, operated by Euskotren Tranbia, connecting the station of Leioa with the University of the Basque Country campus, easing the access to the university campus from other areas of the Greater Bilbao metropolitan area by allowing commuters to use a combination of metro and tram services to reach the campus. The first phase of the project involved the construction of a tram line between the metro station and the university campus, while a future second phase would connect it with the also planned Barakaldo tramway line via a bridge over the Bilbao estuary, which once completed would have been the longest moveable bridge in the world.

The first works began in 2010 with the construction of the tram depot and the setting up of the first meters of railway track, both located next to the metro station. The lasting effects of the Great Recession that followed the 2008 financial crisis caused construction to come to a stop in 2012, after a budget for the project could not be allocated. The project has been on hiatus since, as the Basque Government has not provided any further funding for the project; in 2018 it was stated that there were not any short-term plans to resume construction. Also in 2018, the Basque Government ordered a study to analyze possible alternatives to the tramway.

== Station layout ==
It is an at-grade, open-air station with two side platforms.

=== Access ===
- 1, Iturriondo street (Leioa exit)
- Station's interior
- Park-and-ride

== Services ==
The station is served by Line 1 from Etxebarri to Plentzia. The station is also served by local Leioabus and regional Bizkaibus bus services.
