= Lutxana–Sondika line =

Railway in the Basque Country, Spain

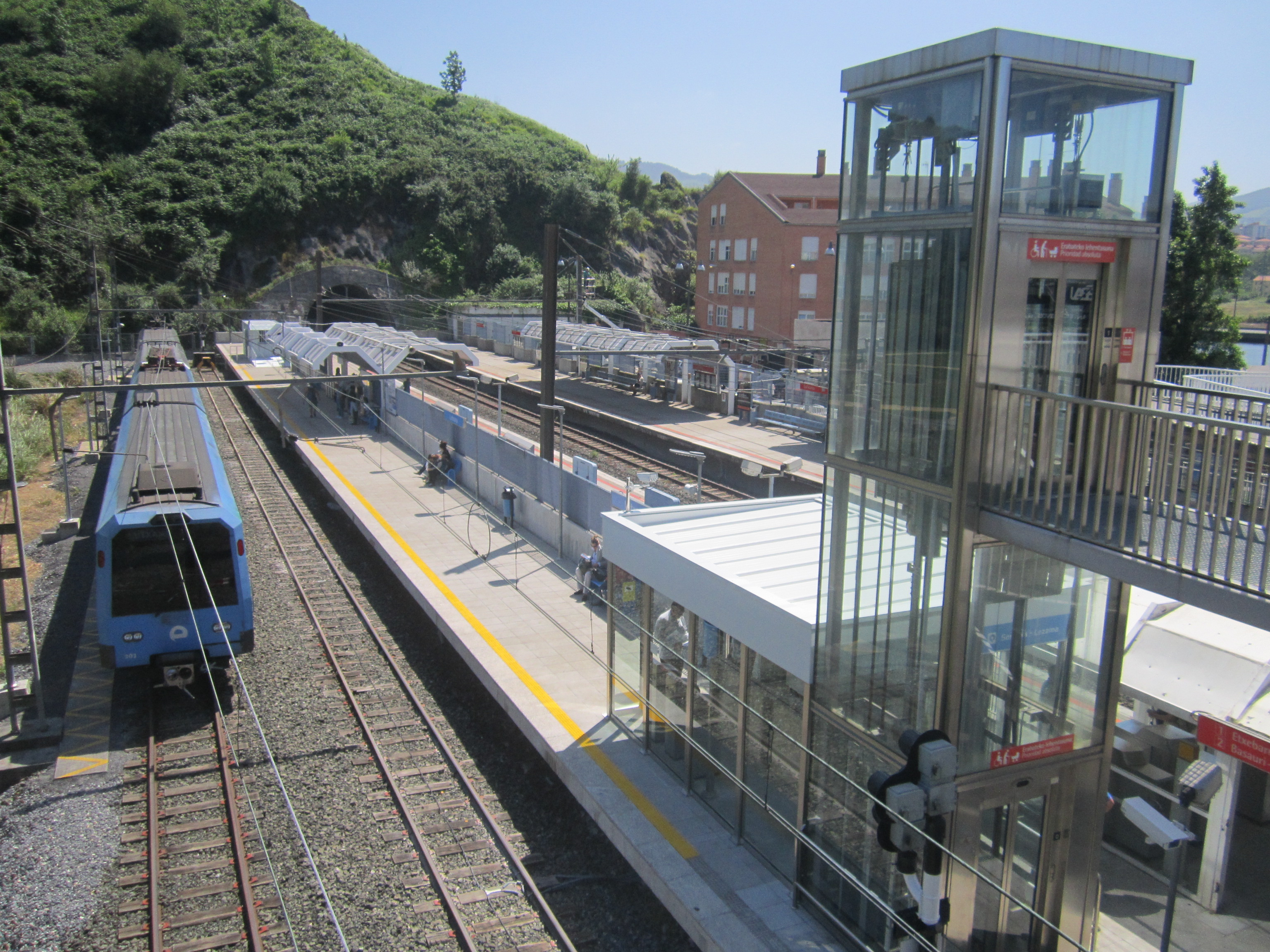
- View of Lutxana station

Overview
- Status: Active
- Owner: Euskal Trenbide Sarea
- Locale: Biscay, Basque Country, Spain
- Termini: Lutxana; Sondika
- Stations: 3

History
- Opened: 1 May 1893

Technical
- Line length: 4.3 km (2.7 mi)
- Number of tracks: Single
- Track gauge: 1,000 mm (3 ft 3 3/8 in)
- Electrification: 1,500 V DC overhead catenary
- Signalling: LZB

The Lutxana–Sondika line (Basque: Lutxana-Sondika trenbidea, Spanish: Ferrocarril Lutxana-Sondika) is a single-track branchline in Biscay, Basque Country, Spain. Owned by Euskal Trenbide Sarea, it runs from Lutxana to Sondika, connecting Line 1 of the Bilbao Metro with the Txorierri line. It is a remnant of the former Lutxana–Mungia line, which was partially closed in May 1975.

== History ==
=== Early years ===
On 10 March 1891, the government granted Manuel Lecanda the concession for building a railway between Lutxana (a neighborhood of Erandio) and Mungia. The Lutxana terminus served as an interchange with the Bilbao–Plentzia railway (nowadays part of Line 1 of the metro). Works started on 14 May that year. The first phase, corresponding to the stretch between Lutxana and Artebakarra, opened on 1 May 1893. The second phase, between Artebakarra and Mungia, opened on 9 July 1894. The first trains left at 5:30 and the last ones at 23:15, with the trip taking 45 minutes.

In 1908, the Bilbao-Lezama line was rerouted through a new alignment which included a connection to Sondika station on the Lutxana–Mungia line. Trains started running through the new connection on 23 July 1909. An extension from Mungia to Bermeo was studied, but wasn't carried out due to the high costs involved. In 1947 the railway was amalgamated into the new company Ferrocarriles y Transportes Suburbanos. The line was electrified in phases between 1949 and 1950.

=== Partial closure and decline ===
Part of the line was in close proximity to Bilbao Airport. Due to the lengthening of the runway, the line was closed between 10 June 1966 and 1 March 1967. A new alignment was built, with the Gastañaga halt being closed as a result. The variant included a new stop at Elotxelerri, distinct from a nearby stop of the same name on the Txorierri line. The new alignment was short lived, as on 11 May 1975 the line was closed between Sondika and Mungia due to another expansion of the airport.

The line was taken over by FEVE in 1977 and Euskotren in 1982. Passenger traffic on the line declined during the 1980s due to the closure of factories along the line. Starting on 1 January 1997, service between Lutxana and Sondika was suspended due to low demand.

=== Current developments ===
The line was reopened to passenger traffic in 2015. During the construction of metro Line 3, the old tunnel through Artxanda was closed. As a result, trains on the Txorierri line had to be provisionally rerouted from Lutxana to Lezama from November 2015 to April 2017. After the opening of line 3 in April 2017, train service on the Txorierri line was completely restored, with its trains running through the new tunnel and the metro line. However, a limited service from Lutxana to Sondika was kept, on a provisional basis at first.

As of 2022, Euskotren is planning to build a new depot on the line, which would by used by trains running on Line 3 of the metro.

== Service ==
E3a line

Overview
- Service type: Commuter rail
- Current operator: Euskotren

Route
- Termini: Lutxana; Sondika
- Stops: Zangroiz
- Line used: Lutxana-Sondika

Technical
- Rolling stock: Euskotren 950 series

The only service operating on the Lutxana–Sondika line is Euskotren Trena line E3a. Operated by Euskotren, it provides an hourly service from Lutxana to Sondika with an intermediate stop at Zangroiz. The shuttle only runs on weekdays.

The current shuttle service started running in April 2017, together with the restoration of the Txorierri line service via the new Artxanda tunnel and Line 3 into Bilbao. During the previous two years, trains had run from Sondika to Lutxana to provide a connection to the metro.

The operator's initial plans were to stop passenger traffic on the Lutxana-Sondika line after the opening of line 3. However, as the connection between Sondika and Lutxana would have been lost otherwise, an hourly service from Lutxana to Sondika was kept. The service ran on a provisional basis for six months, after which its continuation would be evaluated.
