= Elotxelerri station =

Railway station in Loiu, Basque Country, Spain

Elotxelerri
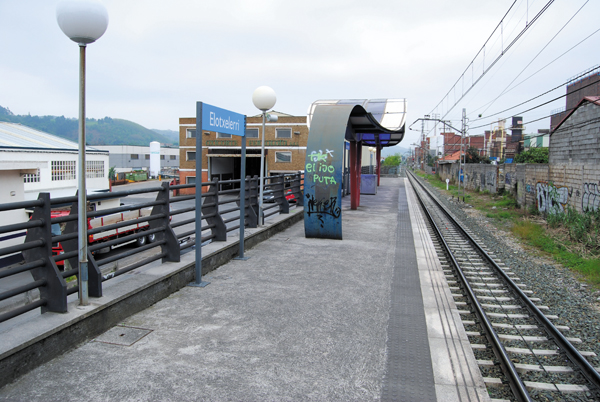
- View of the station before the 2018 renovation

General information
- Location: Loiu, Biscay; Spain
- Coordinates: 43°17′40″N 2°54′21″W
- Owner: Euskal Trenbide Sarea
- Operator: Euskotren
- Line: Line E3
- Platforms: 1 side platform
- Tracks: 1

Construction
- Structure type: At-grade
- Parking: No
- Accessible: Yes

Other information
- Fare zone: Zone 2

History
- Opened: 1990s

Services
Preceding station	Euskotren Trena	Following station
Derio towards Lezama	Line E3	Larrondo towards Kukullaga
Location

Elotxelerri is a railway station in Loiu, Basque Country, Spain. It is owned by Euskal Trenbide Sarea and operated by Euskotren. It lies on the Txorierri line.

== History ==
The station was not part of the Txorierri line when it opened in 1894. Due to budget constraints, the original alignment through Mount Artxanda included prolonged steep slopes. This caused a serious accident only two months after the opening, after which the decision was taken to build a tunnel directly under the mountain. The track in which the station is located opened on 31 October 1908, as part of the new alignment between Bilbao and Lezama. The station was built in the 1990s as part of the renovation of the line, which also included the construction of a new station in Sondika and the extension of the line to Lezama.

The station was renovated in 2018 after trains on the Txorierri line started running through metro Line 3.

== Services ==
The station is served by Euskotren Trena line E3. It runs every 15 minutes (in each direction) during weekdays, and every 30 minutes during weekends.
