= Zangroiz station =

Railway station in Sondika, Basque Country, Spain

Zangroiz
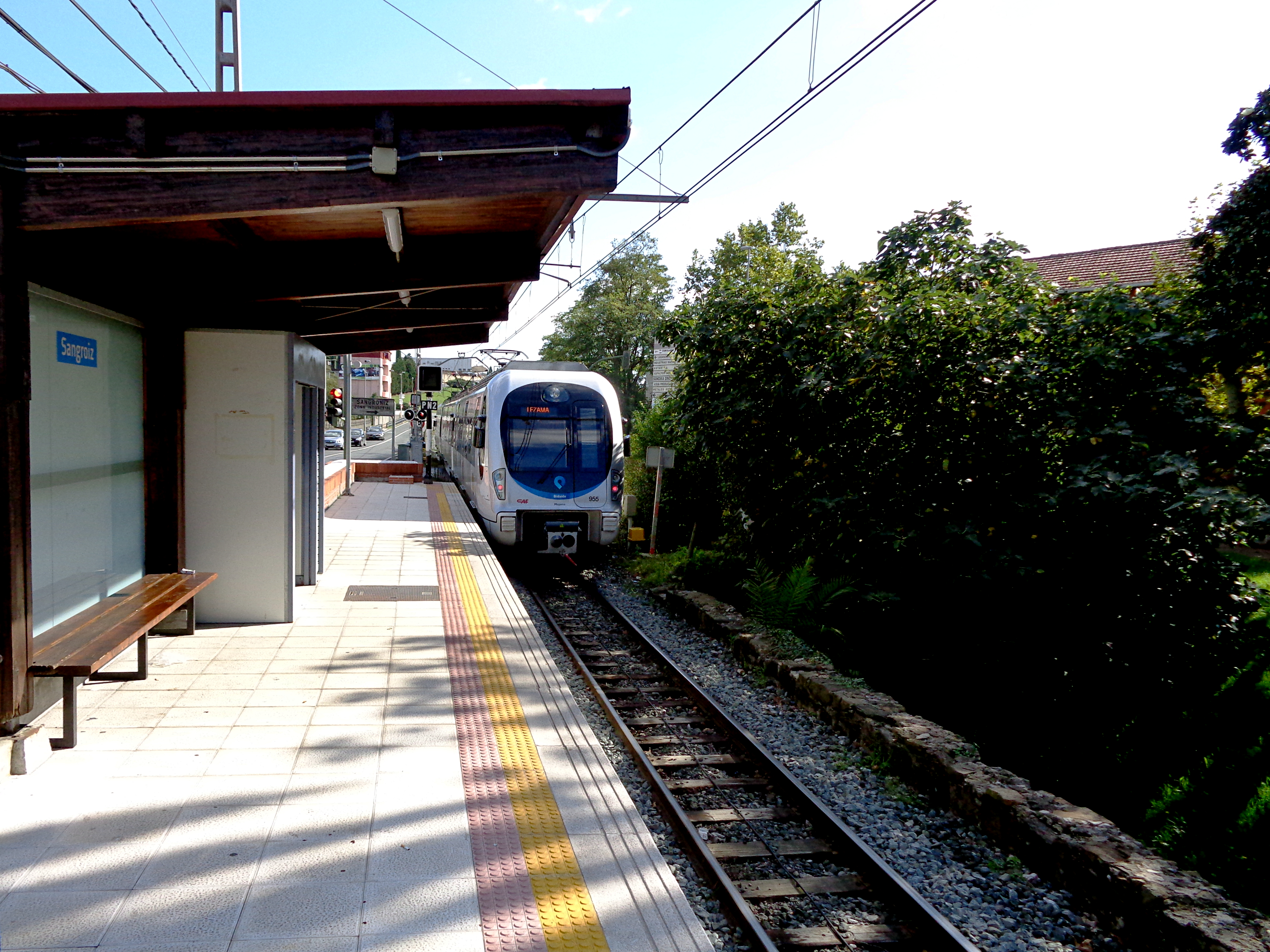
- A 950 series train leaving the station

General information
- Location: Sondika, Biscay; Spain
- Coordinates: 43°18′01″N 2°56′27″W
- Owner: Euskal Trenbide Sarea
- Operator: Euskotren
- Line: Line E3a
- Platforms: 1 side platform
- Tracks: 1

Construction
- Structure type: At-grade
- Parking: No
- Accessible: Yes

Other information
- Fare zone: Zone 2

History
- Opened: 1 January 1894

Services
Preceding station	Euskotren Trena	Following station
Lutxana Terminus	Line E3a	Sondika Terminus
Location

Zangroiz is a railway station in Sondika, Basque Country, Spain. It is owned by Euskal Trenbide Sarea and operated by Euskotren. It lies on the Lutxana–Sondika line.

== History ==
The station opened in 1894 as part of the Lutxana–Mungia line. The line, which starting in 1975 ran only from Lutxana to Sondika, saw passenger service until 1996. Starting on 1 January 1997, service between Lutxana and Sondika was suspended due to low demand.

During the construction of metro Line 3, the old tunnel through Artxanda was closed. As a result, trains on the Txorierri line ran from Lutxana to Lezama from November 2015 to April 2017, with Zangroiz seeing passenger traffic for the first time in almost twenty years. After the opening of Line 3 in April 2017, train service on the Txorierri line was completely restored, with its trains running through the new tunnel and the metro line. However, an hourly service from Lutxana to Sondika was kept.

== Services ==
The station is served on weekdays by an hourly shuttle service (line E3a) from Sondika to Lutxana.
