= Vicente Lapatza =

Spanish footballer (1927–2008)

Personal information
- Full name: Vicente Luis Lapatza Tineo
- Date of birth: 5 August 1927
- Place of birth: Erandio, Spain
- Date of death: 20 January 2008 (aged 80)
- Position: Goalkeeper

Senior career*
Years	Team	Apps	(Gls)
1946–1947	SD Indautxu		
1949–1950	SD Erandio Club		
1951–1952	Universidad Bogotá	12	(0)
1953	Atlético Junior	4	(0)
1953–1954	Sporting de Gijón	5	(0)
- * Club domestic league appearances and goals

Vicente Luis Lapatza Tineo (5 August 1927 – 20 January 2008) was a Spanish footballer who played as a goalkeeper.

== Career ==
Born in Erandio, Lapatza began playing football with local side SD Indautxu, playing in the Tercera División during the 1946–47 season. He joined home-town SD Erandio Club during the 1949–50 Segunda División season, before moving to Colombia to play for Universidad Bogotá and Atlético Junior from 1951 to 1953. In 1953, he returned to Spain and played one season in La Liga with Sporting de Gijón.

Lapatza died on 20 January 2008, at the age of 80.
