= Erandio =

- Municipality
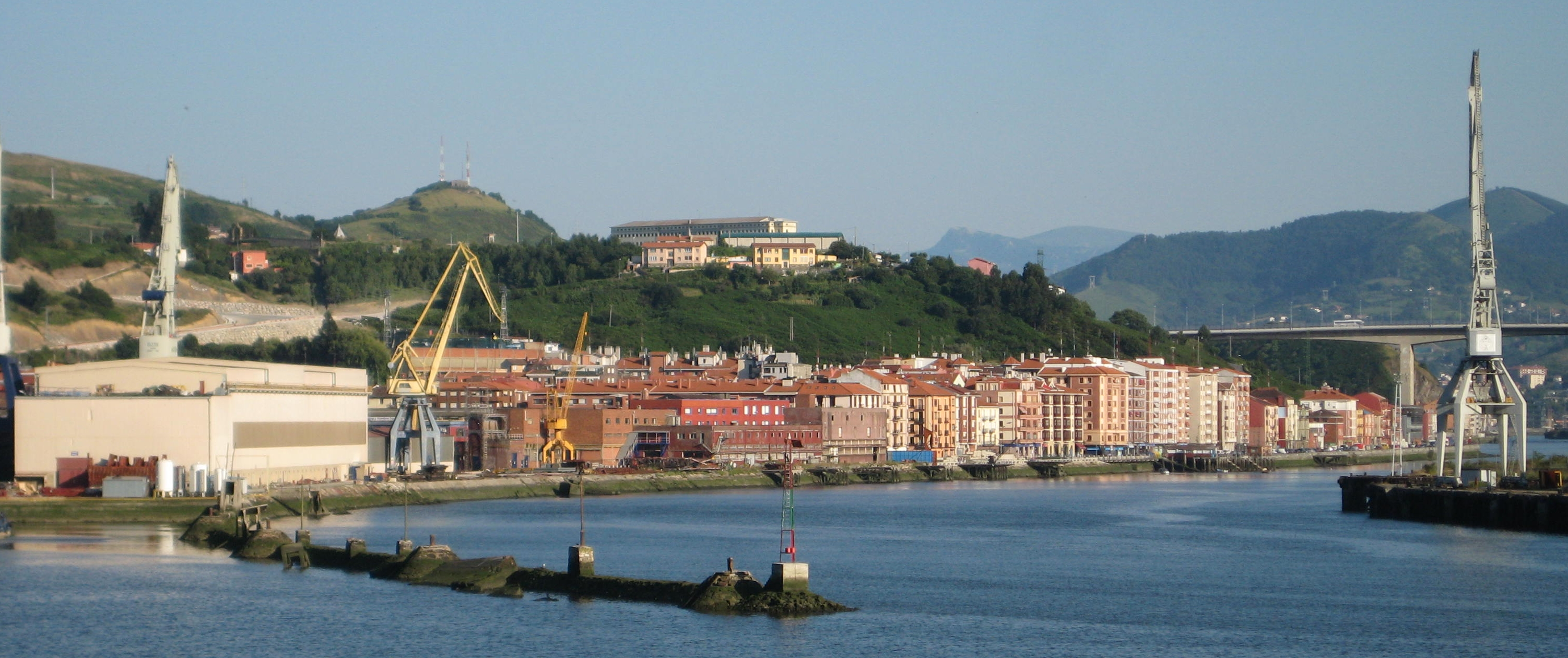
- Erandio

- Coat of arms

- Location of Erandio within the Basque Country
- Coordinates: 43°18′17″N 2°58′23″W
- Country: Spain
- Autonomous community: Basque Country
- Province: Biscay
- Comarca: Greater Bilbao

Government
  - Mayor: Aitziber Oliban Gutiérrez (PNV)

Area
  - Total: 18 km^{2} (6.9 sq mi)
- Elevation (AMSL): 2 m (6.6 ft)

Population (2025-01-01)
  - Total: 24,659
  - Density: 1,400/km^{2} (3,500/sq mi)
- Time zone: UTC+1 (CET)
  - Summer (DST): UTC+2 (CEST (GMT +2))
- Postal code: 48950
- Area code: +34 (Spain) + 94 (Biscay)
- Website: Town Council

Erandio is a town and municipality located in the province of Biscay, in the autonomous community of Basque Country, northern Spain.

== History ==
In 1415, during the War of the Bands, the corregidor, the royally-appointed governor of the Biscayan hermandad, acting on royal orders, siphoned off Biscayan wheat to the Asturias, inciting a rebellion. The Biscayans were defeated at Erandio with the loss of sixty men and the wheat transfers continued.

== Festivals ==
Several annual festivals are celebrated in Erandio.

=== Patron saints' festivities ===
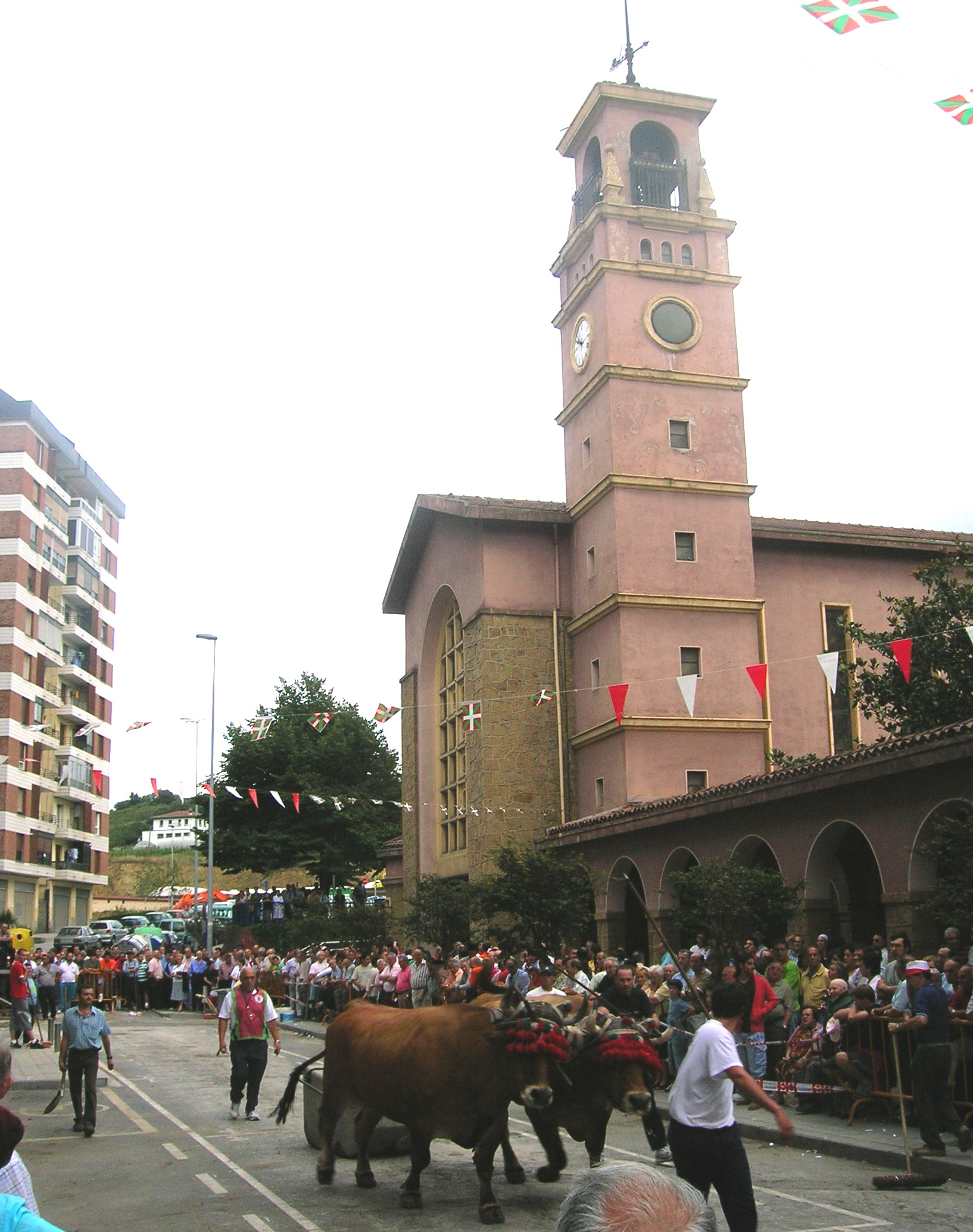
Saint Lawrence's feasts in Astrabudua use to involve idi probak (traditional dragging competitions with oxen).

The main festivals are Patronal festivals (fiestas patronalesin Spanish) (patronage festivals, held in the days around the date dedicated to the patron saints under whose advocation churches and hermits are).

The local public holiday of the municipality rotates yearly on August 10, August 28 and the corpus Christi day.

- June 11, Saint Barnabas in Fano / Faoeta.
- June 13, Saint Anthony of Padua in Martiartu, Goierri.
- June 29, Saint Peter in Kukularra.
- July 3, Saint Tryphon in Arriaga.
- July 10, Saint Christopher in Goierri.
- Second half of July in Asua.
- August 10, Saint Lawrence in Astrabudua.
- August 15, Andra Maria (Our Lady Mary) in Erandio Goikoa (August 15, the day of the Assumption of the Virgin Mary is a public holiday in Spain).
- August 17 and 18: Saint Mammes in Santimami (Saint Mammes' hermit lies on the municipal border and most of the festival acts are held on Leioa's ground).
- August 29, Saint Augustine in Altzaga.
- First week of September in Enekuri.
- Third week of September in Lutxana.

=== Other festivals ===
Erandio has also celebrated a street music festival called Musikale, with music bands marching and playing in the neighbourhoods of Altzaga and Astrabudua. Musikale had been originally conceived in the neighbouring municipality of Leioa. For some years it was held simultaneously in Leioa, Erandio, Basauri and Sestao, but the other municipalities dropped it, and in 2013 only Erandio organised it.

Other public festivals celebrated in September are the recreation of a traditional rural Basque wedding in Astrabudua, and Erandio Magikoa and open-air Festival of Magic held in different neighbourhoods.

== Transport ==
While Asua and Erandio Goikoa are just 3 Km away from Bilbao Airport, other parts of the municipality, like Astrabudua are more than 6 Km away. There is no direct public transport from Erandio to the passenger's terminal, though buses can be taken in the neighbouring municipalities of Loiu and Bilbao.

=== Land transport ===
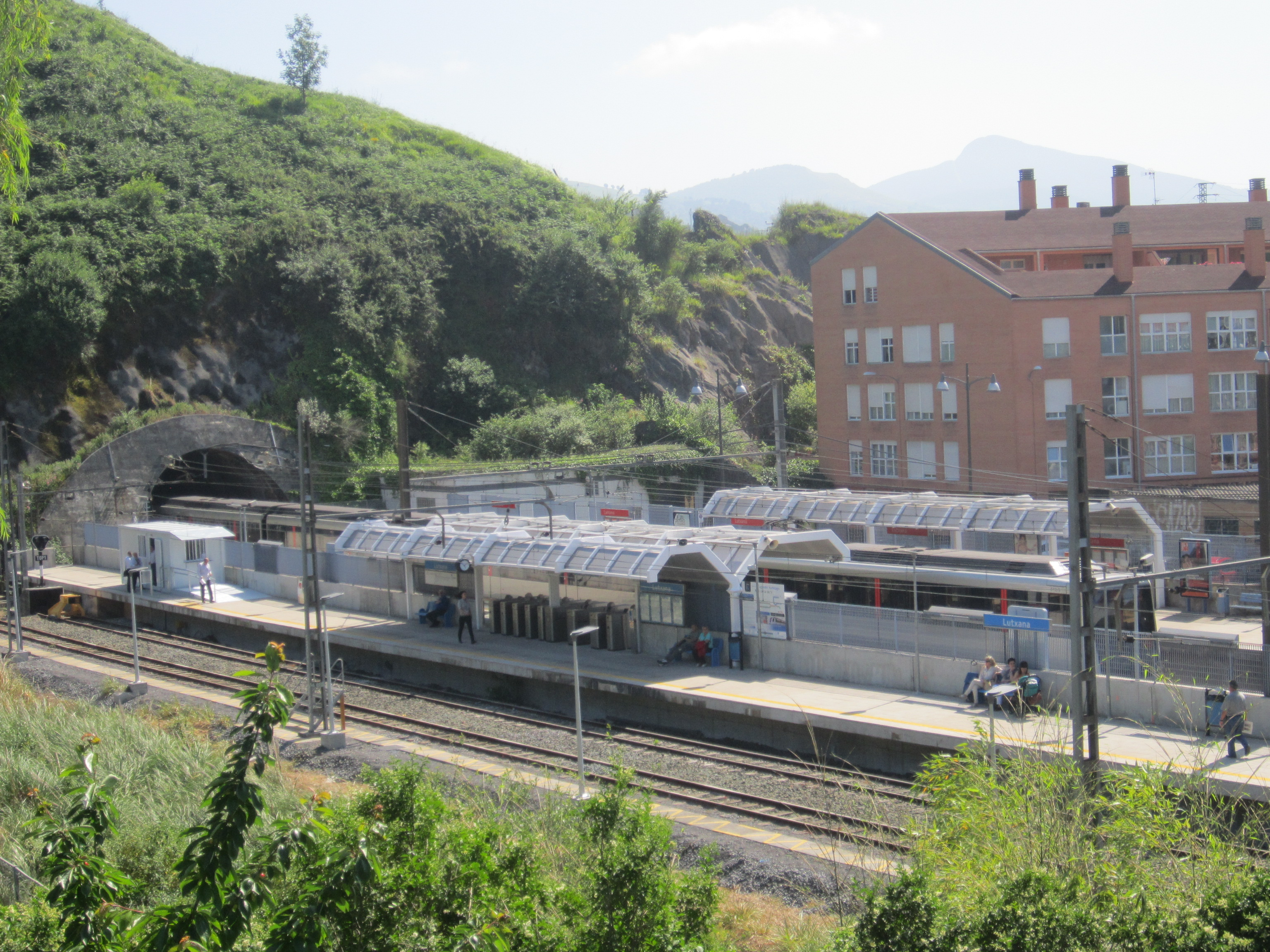
Euskotren and Metro Bilbao stations in the neighbourhood of Lutxana.

Erandio is connected to other municipalities of Biscay (like Barakaldo, Bermeo, Bilbao, Derio, Getxo, Larrabetzu, Laukiz, Leioa, Mungia and Muskiz) by Bizkaibus bus services and by Line 1 of the Bilbao Metro, which has three stations in Erandio (Lutxana, Erandio, and Astrabudua), and by Euskotren trains.

=== Fluvial transport ===
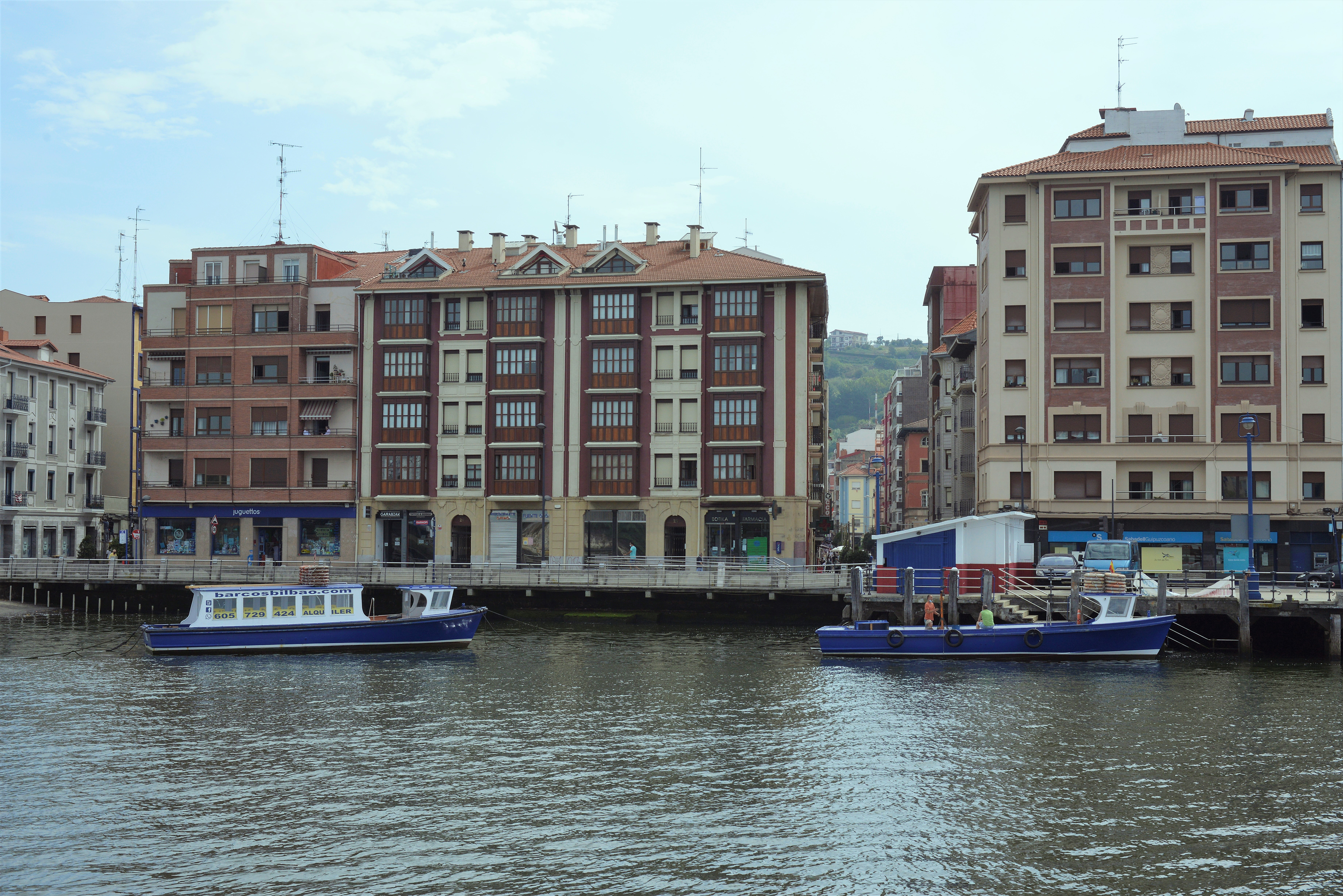
Gasolinos in 2020.

There are several bridges over the minor rivers, such as Asua, but there is currently only one bridge over the Estuary of Bilbao, formed by the Ibaizabal - Nervión river, the Rontegi bridge only for motorised vehicles.

There is a project for a pedestrian bridge, which will be called All Iron Zubia between Erandio and Barakaldo.

Erandio was also connected to Barakaldo by fluvial passenger transport over the Estuary, first by rowing boats, and since the 20th century in motorised boats, which were popularly known as gasolino. Regular fluvial transport service was interrupted in February 2024, due to economic difficulties caused by the rise of fuel prices and the competence of land public transport, though private boats are occasionally hired for leisure travel along the estuary.

== Notable people ==
- Ramon Rubial (1906–1999), politician.
- Rafael Eguzkiza (1912–1981), footballer
- Telmo Zarraonandía Zarra (1921–2006), footballer
- Luis María Echeberría (1940–2016), footballer
- Alex Angulo (1953–2014), actor
- Sendoa Agirre (1975–), footballer
- Vicente Lapatza (1927–), footballer
