= Sondika station =

Railway station in Sondika, Basque Country, Spain

Sondika
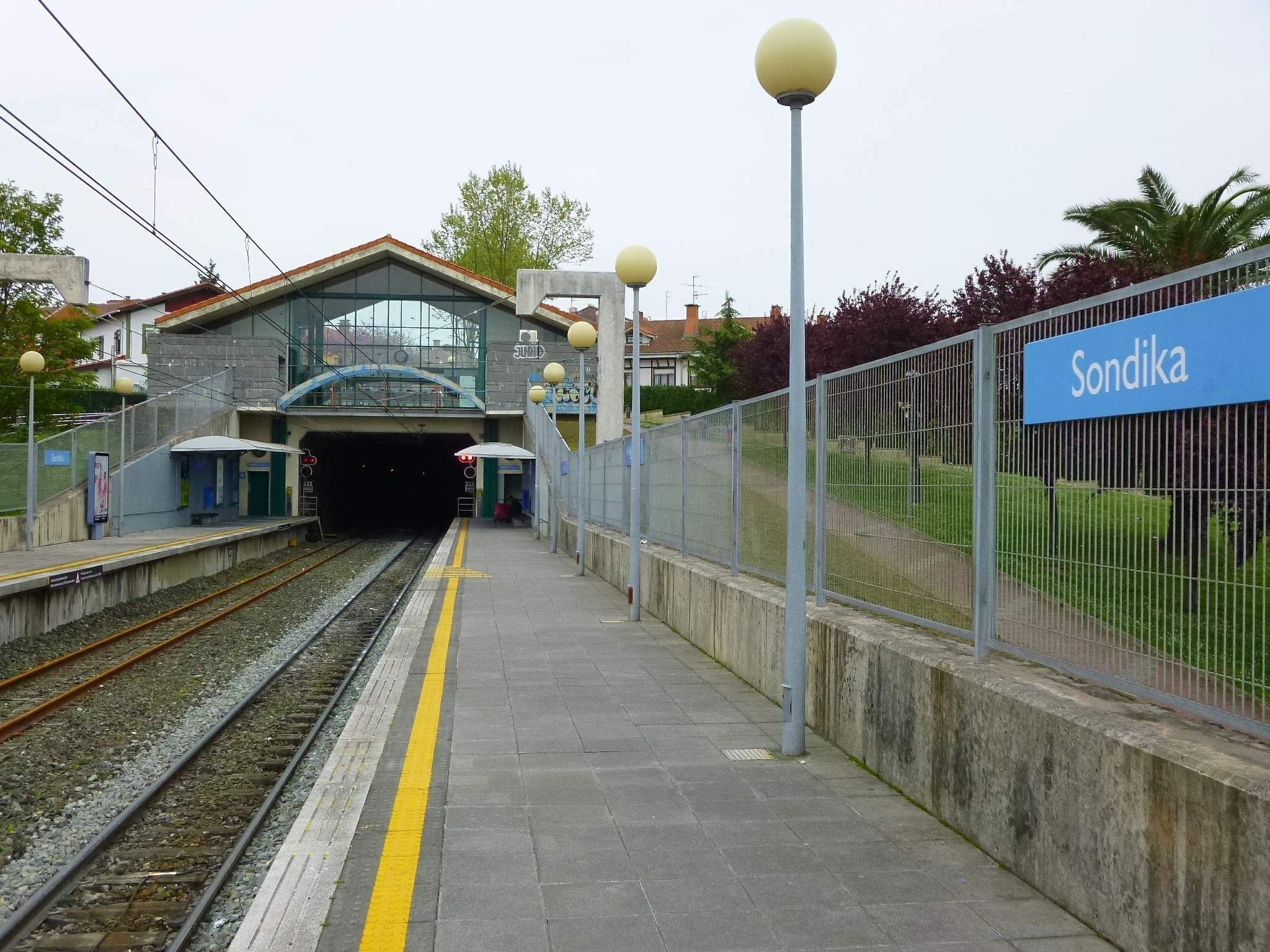
- View of the platforms

General information
- Location: Sondika, Biscay; Spain
- Coordinates: 43°17′54″N 2°55′40″W
- Owner: Euskal Trenbide Sarea
- Operator: Euskotren
- Lines: Line E3; Line E3a
- Platforms: 2 side platforms
- Tracks: 2

Construction
- Structure type: At-grade
- Parking: Yes
- Accessible: Yes

Other information
- Fare zone: Zone 2

History
- Opened: 1 January 1894
- Rebuilt: 1992

Services
Preceding station	Euskotren Trena	Following station
Larrondo towards Lezama	Line E3	Ola towards Kukullaga
Zangroiz towards Lutxana	Line E3a	Terminus
Location

Sondika is a railway station in Sondika, Basque Country, Spain. It is owned by Euskal Trenbide Sarea and operated by Euskotren. It lies on the Txorierri line.

== History ==
The station opened in 1894 as part of the Lutxana–Mungia line. The station was located to the north of the current station, close to where Bilbao Airport was later built. In 1908 the Bilbao–Lezama line was rerouted through a new alignment which included a connection to the station. Trains started running from Bilbao to Sondika through the Bilbao–Lezama line on 23 July 1909. The line was electrified in 1949.

The line from Sondika to Mungia closed in March 1975 due to the lengthening of the airport runway. The station was rebuilt in its current location in 1992, thus allowing for a direct connection between Lutxana and Lezama. After Line 1 of the metro took over the Bilbao–Plentzia line in 1995, service on the Lutxana–Sondika line was suspended due to low passenger demand.

During the construction of metro Line 3, the old tunnel through Artxanda was closed. As a result, trains on the Txorierri line ran from Lutxana to Lezama from November 2015 to April 2017. After the opening of line 3 in April 2017, train service on the Txorierri line was completely restored, with its trains running through the new tunnel and the metro line. However, an hourly service from Lutxana to Sondika was kept.

If the long-planned railway line to the airport is built, the station will be rebuilt underground as part of a new alignment between Ola and Sondika that will remove the need to reverse at the latter station.

== Services ==
The station is served by Euskotren Trena line E3. It runs every 15 minutes (in each direction) during weekdays, and every 30 minutes during weekends. The station is also served on weekdays by an hourly shuttle service (line E3a) to Lutxana.
