= Iñaki Sáez =

Spanish footballer and manager

Personal information
- Full name: José Ignacio Sáez Ruiz
- Date of birth: 23 April 1943 (age 83)
- Place of birth: Bilbao, Spain
- Height: 1.70 m (5 ft 7 in)
- Position: Defender

Youth career
- 1958–1961: San Vicente

Senior career*
Years	Team	Apps	(Gls)
1961–1962	Barakaldo		
1962–1974	Athletic Bilbao	263	(7)

International career
1968	Spain	3	(0)

Managerial career
- 1974–1978: Athletic Bilbao (youth)
- 1978–1979: Bilbao Athletic
- 1980–1981: Athletic Bilbao
- 1982–1983: Bilbao Athletic
- 1986: Athletic Bilbao
- 1987–1991: Bilbao Athletic
- 1991–1992: Athletic Bilbao
- 1993–1994: Las Palmas
- 1995: Las Palmas
- 1996: Albacete
- 1996–2001: Spain U18
- 1996–2002: Spain U21
- 1997–2001: Spain U20
- 2000: Spain U23
- 2001–2002: Spain U19
- 2002–2004: Spain
- 2004–2008: Spain U21
- 2005: Spain U20
- * Club domestic league appearances and goals

José Ignacio "Iñaki" Sáez Ruiz (born 23 April 1943) is a Spanish former football player and manager.

A defender, he spent the vast majority of his professional career with Athletic Bilbao. He appeared in more than 300 official games in 12 seasons, and later coached it at various levels.

In addition to two other clubs, Sáez managed the Spain national team for two years, being in charge at Euro 2004.

== Playing career ==
Born in Bilbao, Basque Country, Sáez joined local giants Athletic Bilbao in 1962, from neighbouring Barakaldo. He totalled 46 La Liga games – with five goals – in his first two seasons, but only 20 the following three, due to injuries.

Again healthy, Sáez appeared regularly for Athletic from 1967 to 1974, helping the Lions to two Copa del Rey trophies, and retired at the age of 31, having appeared in 338 competitive matches for the club. He was part of a legendary defense that also featured José Ángel Iribar in goal, Luis María Echeberría and Jesús Aranguren.

Sáez earned three caps for Spain in one month in 1968, his first and his last appearance being against the same opponent, England, in two losses for the UEFA Euro 1968 qualifying stage (1–0 in London, 2–1 in Madrid).

== Coaching career ==
=== Club ===
Sáez began a managerial career immediately after retiring, taking charge of Athletic Bilbao's youth sides for five years. Only two games into the 1980–81 season, Austrian Helmut Senekowitsch was dismissed, and he led the team to a final ninth position, and returned again to the reserves, helping it to a Segunda División return in 1983.

Sáez again took the reins of the main squad in 1985–86, replacing Javier Clemente for the final 13 fixtures and leading Athletic to the third place, behind Real Madrid and Barcelona. In the following four seasons, he coached the reserves in the second tier, being again promoted to the first team midway through 1990–91, again taking over from Clemente, and being himself fired after round 23 of the following campaign, as they only finished two points above the relegation zone.

After two spells with Las Palmas, both in the third division, Sáez was appointed at top-flight Albacete, replacing Benito Floro in mid-March 1996, his first game in charge being a 2–0 away loss against Real Madrid as the season ended in relegation via the playoffs.

=== Spain ===
In the summer of 1996, Sáez was appointed the Spain under-21 team manager, winning the UEFA European Championship two years later after defeating Greece. Also being in charge of the under-20s, he led them to the FIFA World Cup of the category in 1999 in Nigeria.

Sáez was named José Antonio Camacho's successor at the helm of the senior team in 2002. He remained in the post until the end of Euro 2004 – which ended in group-stage exit – collecting 15 wins, six draws and two losses in 23 matches.

Subsequently, Sáez returned to the under-21 team.

== Honours ==
=== Player ===
Athletic Bilbao

- Copa del Generalísimo: 1969, 1972–73

=== Manager ===
Bilbao Athletic

- Segunda División B: 1982–83, 1988–89

Spain U18

- UEFA European Championship third place: 1997

Spain U19

- UEFA European Championship: 2002

Spain U20

- FIFA World Youth Championship: 1999

Spain U21

- UEFA European Championship: 1998

Spain U23

- Summer Olympic silver medal: 2000
