= Loiu =

- Municipality
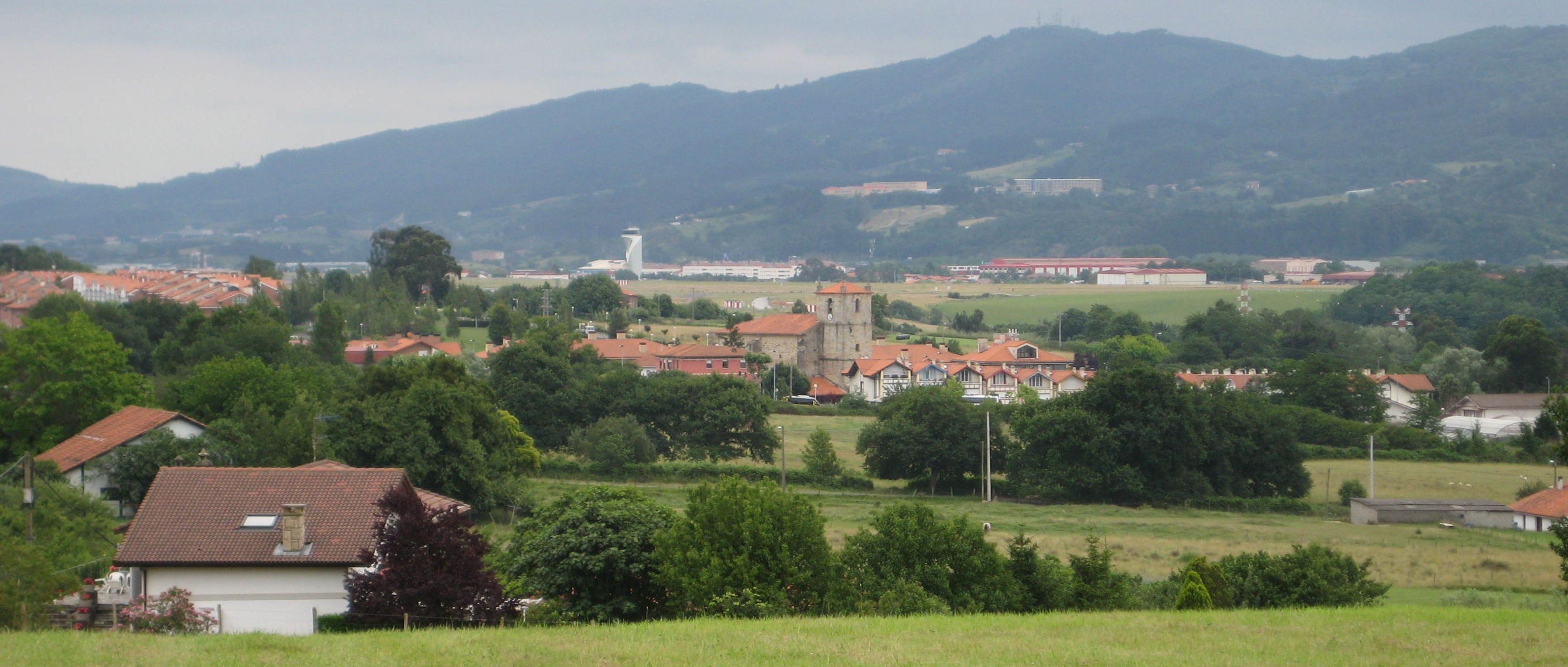

- Flag Coat of arms

- Location of Loiu within the Basque Country Loiu (Spain)
- Coordinates: 43°18′53″N 2°56′20″W
- Country: Spain
- Autonomous community: Basque Country
- Province: Biscay
- Comarca: Greater Bilbao

Area
  - Total: 15 km^{2} (5.8 sq mi)
- Elevation: 26 m (85 ft)

Population (2025-01-01)
  - Total: 2,364
  - Density: 160/km^{2} (410/sq mi)
- Demonym: Basque: loiutarra
- Time zone: UTC+1 (CET)
  - Summer (DST): UTC+2 (CEST)
- Postal code: 48180
- Website: Official website

Loiu (Spanish: Lujua) is a town and municipality located in the province of Biscay, in the autonomous community of Basque Country, northern Spain.

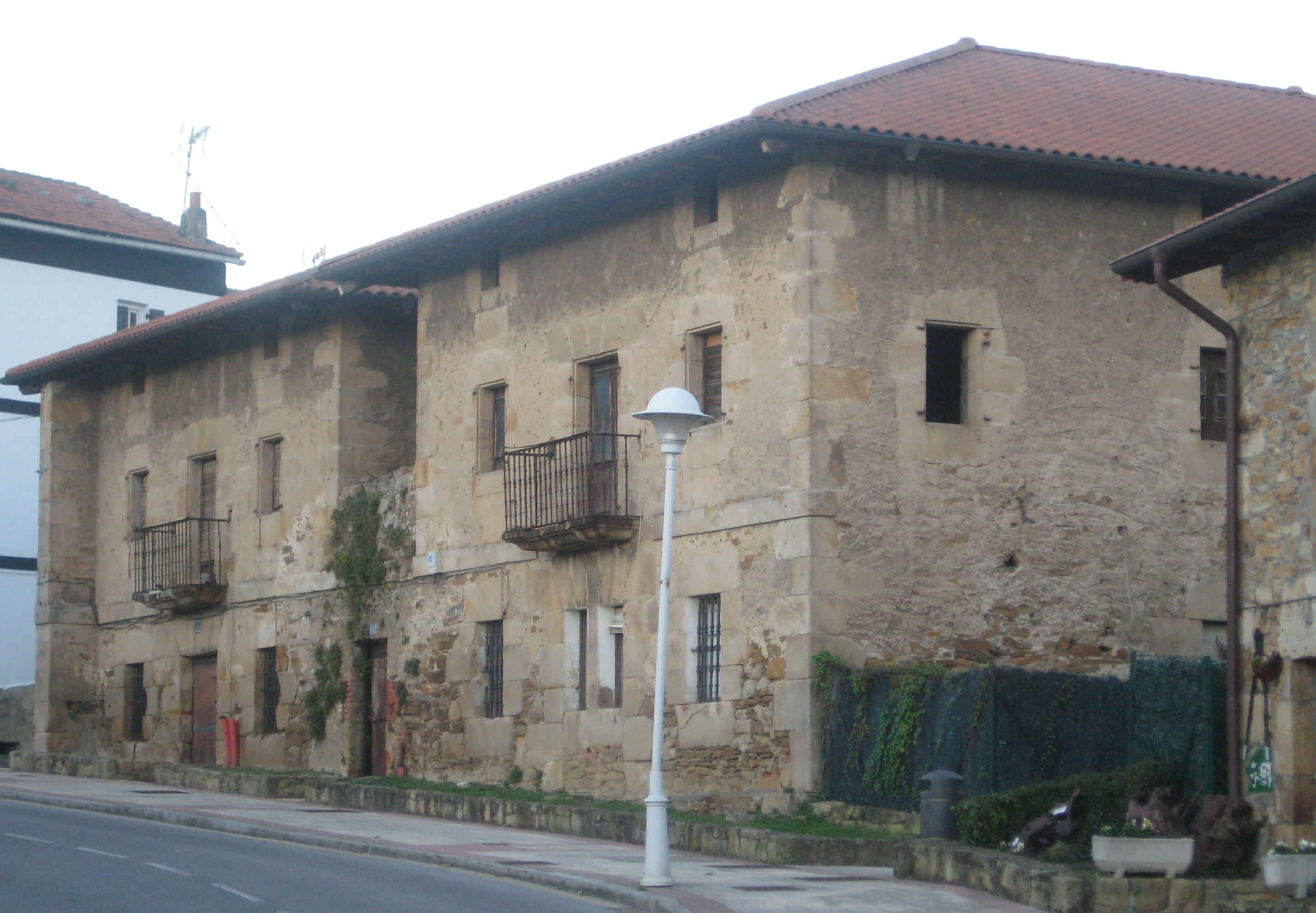
Priests' houses in Zabaloetxe.

The Bilbao Airport terminal lies within the municipality limits.

== Geography ==
Loiu is located in the Asua Valley, with Derio lying to the East and Erandio to the West.

== Composition ==
A big part of the population is dispersed around country farmhouses (called baserri or caseríos). The main neighbourhood is Zabaloetxe, where the church is located. Other urban areas are Elochelerri (in Basque Elotxelerri), on the way to Asua Valley (BI-637), next to the airport, and Lauros (Lauro).

== Airport ==
Since the most recent expansion of Bilbao Airport, many of its facilities including the passenger terminal are located within the municipality.

== Toponym ==
In Euskera, the town is officially called Loiu. In Spanish, the town is called Lujua.

The old name of the town was Luxua, but it was converted into Spanish after the phonetic evolution of x/j (around 17th century) in Lujua (paralleling the change Xerez -> Jerez).

In Euskera, the phonetic evolution of the toponym was different: when the -a ending was lost, phoneme x evolved in a different way to the Spanish language y, and the variation of the tonic syllable lu for lo. That is Luxu(a) -> Lu(x)u -> L(u)iu -> Loiu. Euskaltzaindia adopted Loiu as the official form of the name.. Loiu adopted its official name in 1983.

== See also ==
- Caserío Bengoetxe
