= Miren Basaras =

Spanish microbiologist

Miren Basaras Ibarzabal
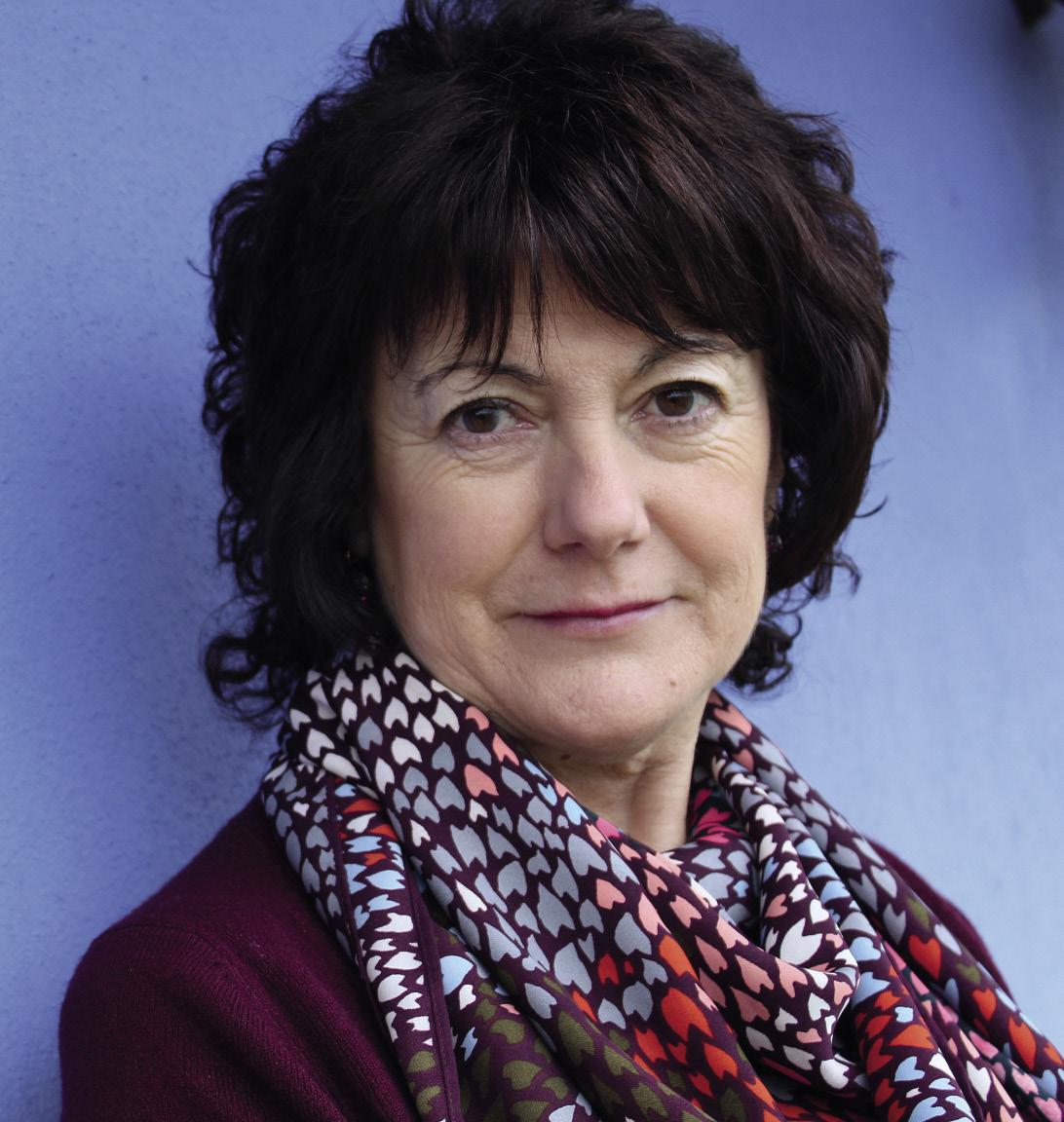
- Born: 1968 (age 57–58); Derio (Spain)
- Education: Universidad del País Vasco (PhD)
- Occupations: Researcher, microbiologist, and university professor
- Employer: Universidad del País Vasco

Miren Basaras Ibarzabal (born in Derio, Spain, 1968) is a Spanish microbiologist and professor of the Universidad del País Vasco (University of the Basque Country, or UPV/EHU) in the department of immunology, microbiology, and parasitology of the Faculty of Medicine and Nursing in Vizcaya.

In September 2020, she became the leader of the COVID-19 surveillance committee, the organization of the UPV/EHU in charge of the effects that the disease could cause on the university campus.

== Biography ==
Basaras received her bachelor's degree in biology at the Universidad del País Vasco and her doctorate in 1995 with the thesis Detección de RNA en la infección por VHC. Implicación en la terapéutica de las hepatitis crónicas (Detection of RNA in HCV infections. Implication for the treatment of chronic hepatitis). She is an associate professor of microbiology and teaches in the medical program, as well as in the microbiology and health master's degree and microbiology doctorate programs.

She also leads the COVID-19 surveillance committee, the organization of the UPV/EHU in charge of the coordination, assessment, information, monitoring, and control of the daily effects on the university from the SARS-CoV-2 pandemic.

== Works ==
- Mikrobiologia medikoa (2004, EHU). Co-author: Adelaida Umaran.
- Desafíos de la Microbiología. Libro homenaje al profesor Ramón Cisterna Cancér (2018, EHU). Co-author: Lucila Madariaga.
