= Jesús Aranguren =

Spanish footballer and coach

Txutxi Aranguren
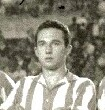

Personal information
- Full name: Jesús Aranguren Merino
- Date of birth: 26 December 1944
- Place of birth: Portugalete, Spain
- Date of death: 21 March 2011 (aged 66)
- Place of death: Barakaldo, Spain
- Height: 1.69 m (5 ft 6 1/2 in)
- Position: Defender

Youth career
- Sestao
- 1961–1962: Athletic Bilbao

Senior career*
Years	Team	Apps	(Gls)
1962–1975	Athletic Bilbao	247	(4)

International career
1962–1963	Spain U18	3	(2)
1963	Spain amateur	3	(0)

Managerial career
- 1975–1976: Basque Country (youth)
- 1976–1977: Athletic Bilbao (youth)
- 1977–1978: Bilbao Athletic
- 1978–1980: Alavés
- 1981–1984: Recreativo
- 1984–1985: Cartagena
- 1985–1986: Deportivo La Coruña
- 1986–1988: Logroñés
- 1988–1989: Sporting Gijón
- 1990: Basque Country
- 1992: Athletic Bilbao
- 1994–1997: Alavés
- 1998: Levante
- 1998–2000: Cartagonova
- 2001–2003: Alavés B
- 2003: Alavés
- 2003–2005: Alavés B
- * Club domestic league appearances and goals

Jesús 'Txutxi' Aranguren Merino (26 December 1944 – 21 March 2011) was a Spanish football defender and coach.

His 13-year professional career was solely associated with Athletic Bilbao, with which he played in nearly 400 official games, winning two Copa del Rey trophies.

== Playing career ==
Born in Portugalete, Biscay, Aranguren joined Basque Country giants Athletic Bilbao's youth system at the age of 16, from neighbouring Sestao Sport Club. On 18 November 1962, one month shy of his 18th birthday, he made his first-team – and La Liga – debut, playing the entire 2–1 away win against Córdoba CF, and finished his first season with 18 matches.

Aranguren would be an important defensive unit for Athletic in the following 11 campaigns, starting in 225 of the 229 games he appeared in the league and helping to win two Copa del Rey trophies. After no appearances in 1974–75 he retired from football, aged only 30; during his spell with the club he scored five own goals to another legendary teammate, José Ángel Iribar.

== Coaching career ==
Aranguren started managing at his only club, being in charge of its youth teams first then the reserves. Subsequently, he spent nine seasons in the second division, starting with another local side, Deportivo Alavés, and achieving promotion in 1987 with CD Logroñés, a first-ever for the Riojans; also under his guidance, they managed to retain their status the following season.

After one year with Sporting de Gijón, Aranguren managed Athletic Bilbao during fifteen games in the 1991–92 season, following the dismissal of his former club teammate Iñaki Sáez. With six wins, two draws and seven losses, he eventually placed the team out of the relegation zone (14th position).

In 1994, Aranguren returned to Alavés, winning promotion in his first year and staying with the team for a further two seasons, the second ending on 16 February 1997 following a 2–3 home loss against RCD Mallorca. In the following years, he worked mainly with Alavés' B-team; however, on 29 April 2003, he replaced Mané at the helm of the main squad for the final seven games of the campaign, which ended in top-flight relegation.

== Death ==
Aranguren retired from management in 2005, to care for his sick wife. On 21 March 2011, whilst accompanying her to a checkup in the Cruces Hospital in Barakaldo, he succumbed to a heart attack, dying at the age of 66.

== Honours ==
=== Player ===
Athletic Bilbao

- Copa del Generalísimo: 1969, 1972–73; Runner-up 1965–66, 1966–67

=== Manager ===
Alavés

- Segunda División B: 1994–95

== See also ==
- List of one-club men
