= Leioa =

- Municipality
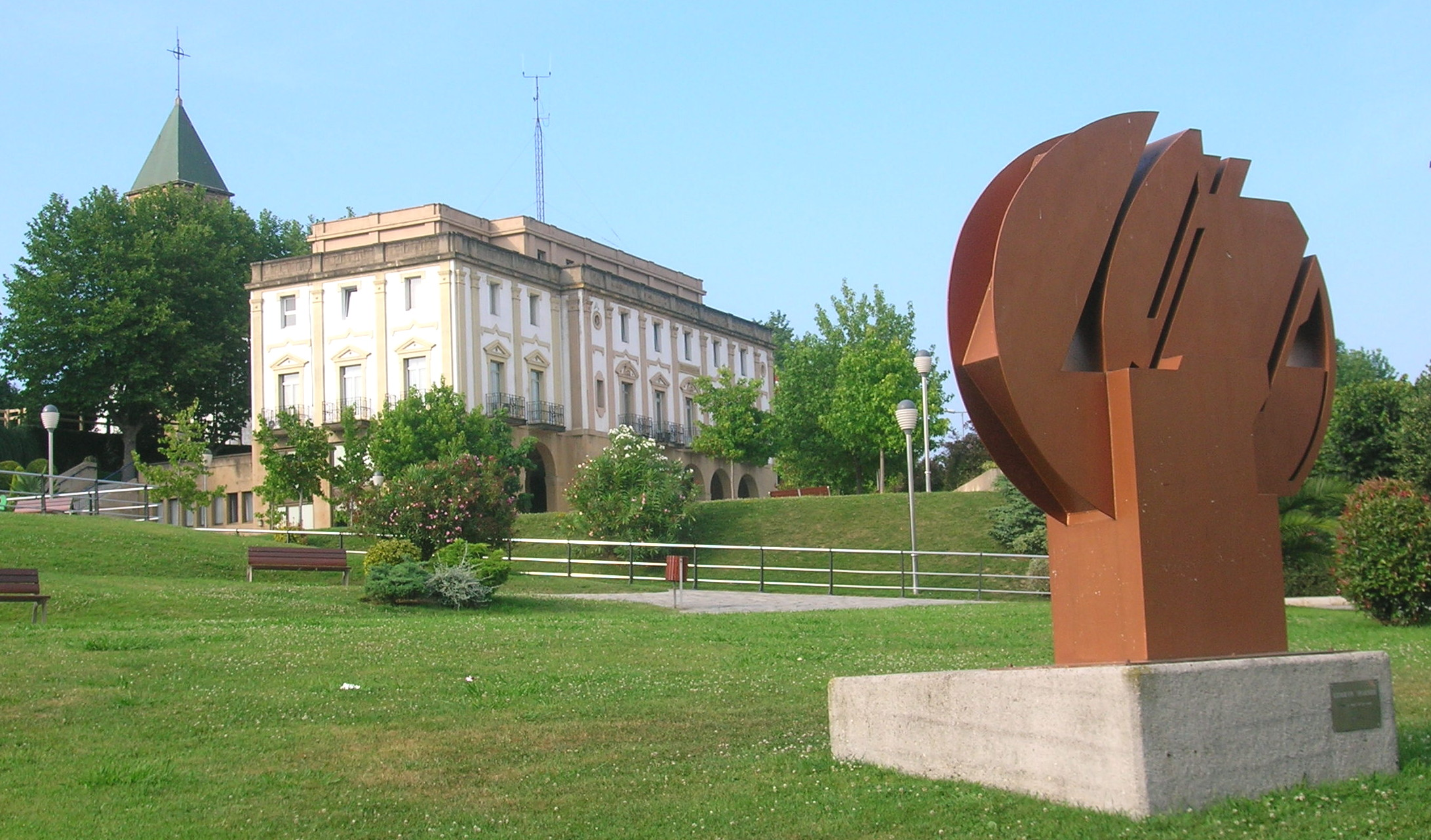
- Leioa town hall

- Coat of arms

- Location of Leioa within the Basque Country
- Coordinates: 43°19′44″N 2°59′5″W
- Country: Spain
- Autonomous Community: Basque Country
- Province: Biscay
- Comarca: Greater Bilbao

Area
  - Total: 8.5 km^{2} (3.3 sq mi)
- Elevation (AMSL): 30 m (98 ft)

Population (2025-01-01)
  - Total: 32,748
  - Density: 3,900/km^{2} (10,000/sq mi)
- Time zone: UTC+1 (CET)
  - Summer (DST): UTC+2 (CEST (GMT +2))
- Postal code: 48940
- Area code: +34 (Spain) + 94 (Biscay)
- Website: Town Hall

Leioa (Spanish: Lejona) is a municipality in Biscay, Basque Country, in northern Spain. It is located south of Getxo and Berango delimitating east and south with Erandio, Portugalete and Sestao. Today it is part of the Bilbao conurbation. Its population in 2019 was 31,795. Leioa has an area of 8.36 square kilometres (3.23 sq mi). The Udondo river constitutes the eastern limit of the municipality.

== History ==
Leioa has its origins in 1526, before which it was part of the "anteiglesia de Erandio". It was a village with no more than 8000 people until the 1960s, when development came its way, as Bilbao expanded. Its population experienced a rapid increase in the 1970s, and a more moderate growth afterwards. It has become a part of metropolitan Bilbao.

== Neighborhoods ==
- Peruri, Zuazu, Sarriena, Santsoena and Lertutxe.
- Tellería, Basaez, Artatzagane, Negurigane and Aldekoane.
- Artaza, Elexalde, Ikea Mendi, Udondo, Mendibil and Santimami.
- Pinueta, Lamiako, Txopoeta, Ondiz, Txorierri, Aketxe and Ibaiondo (Santa Ana).

== Features ==
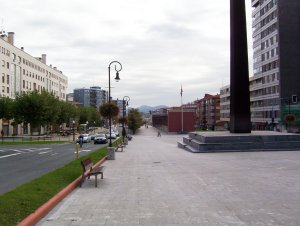
The main boulevard in Leioa (Looking south towards Bilbao).

The municipality of Leioa still retains much of its agricultural past and out of the urban centre many traditional Basque houses can still be seen on little family farms, though rapid development puts their long-term future in question. The University of the Basque Country (EHU-UPV Euskal Herriko Unibertsitatea - Universidad del Pais Vasco) has most faculties within this municipality.

== Festivities ==
- May 29: “Lamiako maskarada” festivity in Lamiako.
- June 24: “San Joan Bataiatzailea” festivity in Elexalde.
- August 24: “San Bartolomé” festivity in Basaez.
- September 8: “Ntra. Sra. De los Remedios” festivity in Ondiz.
- May 15: “San Isidro” festivity.
- August 17: Santi Mami jaiak.
- September 10: Udondoko jaiak.
- September 29: San Miguel Txopoetako jaiak.

== Metro ==
Two consecutive stations of Line 1 of the Bilbao Metro rapid transit system are located in Leioa: Leioa and Lamiako.

== Notable people ==
- Félix Sesúmaga (1898–1925), professional footballer
