= Sondika =

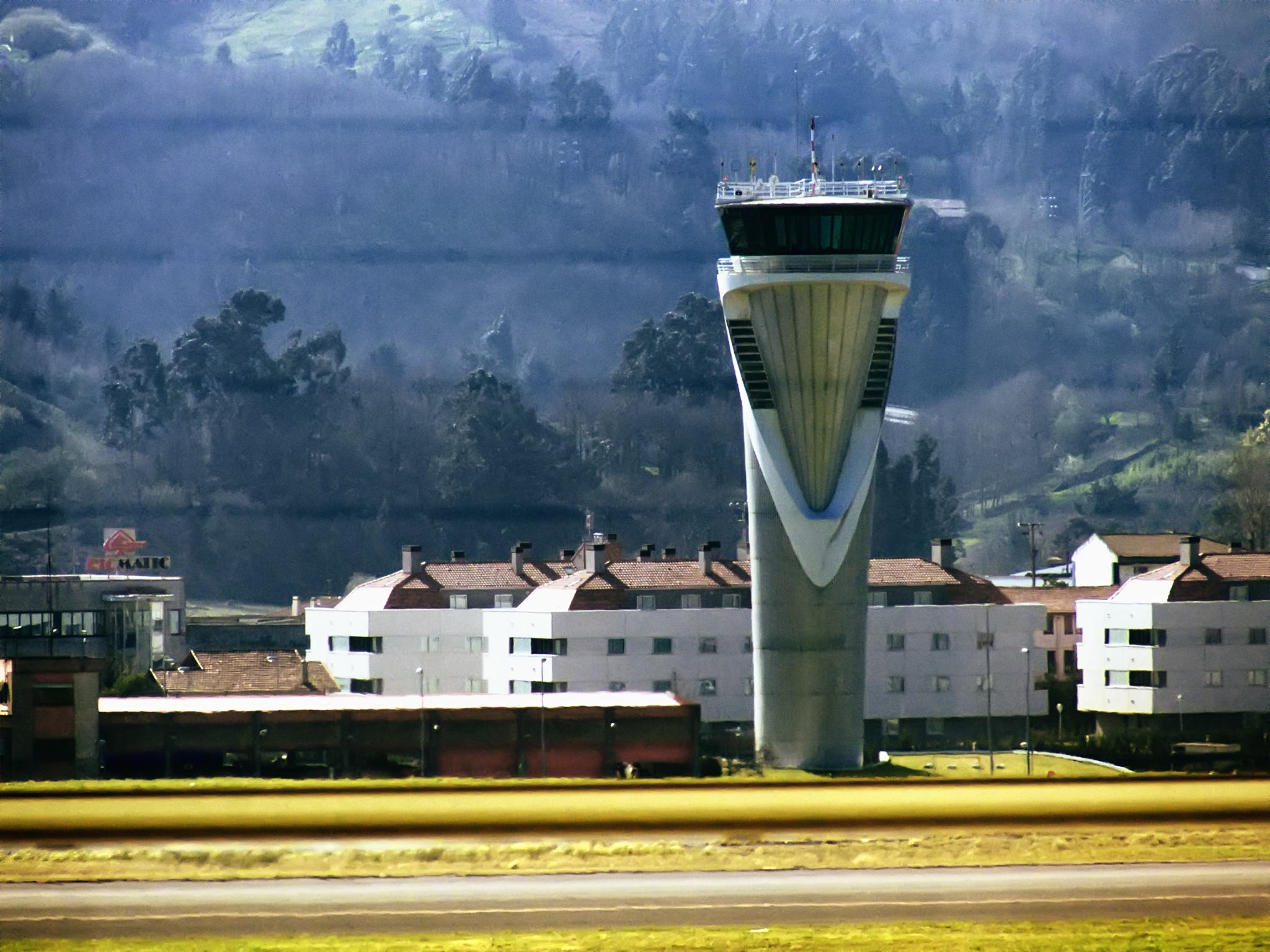

- Coat of arms

- Location of Sondika within the Basque Country
- Coordinates: 43°17′56″N 2°55′31″W
- Country: Spain
- Autonomous community: Basque Country
- Province: Biscay
- Eskualdea: Greater Bilbao

Government
  - Mayor: Gorka Carro Bilbao

Area
  - Total: 6.30 km^{2} (2.43 sq mi)
- Elevation: 27 m (89 ft)

Population (2025-01-01)
  - Total: 4,670
  - Density: 741/km^{2} (1,920/sq mi)
- Time zone: UTC+1 (CET)
  - Summer (DST): UTC+2 (CEST)
- Website: www.sondika.eus

Sondika (Spanish, Sondica) is a town and municipality located in the province of Biscay, in the Autonomous Community of Basque Country, northern Spain.

Situated directly south of the runway of Bilbao Airport, it is the location of Bilbao British Cemetery, containing a Commonwealth War Graves Cemetery with 58 casualties (not to be confused with a far larger municipal cemetery in neighbouring Derio).
