= Derio =

- Municipality
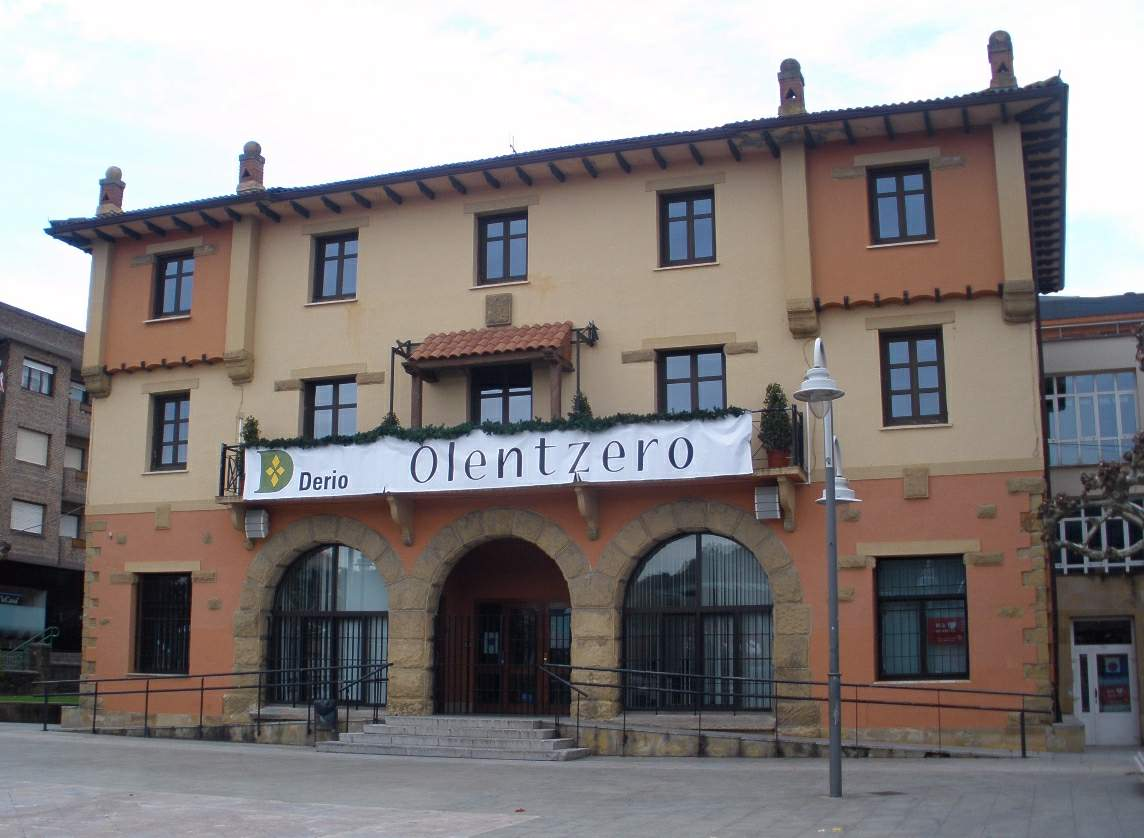
- Town hall

- Flag Coat of arms

- Location within the Basque Country Location within Spain
- Coordinates: 43°17′30″N 2°53′09″W
- Country: Spain
- Autonomous community: Basque Country
- Province: Biscay
- Comarca: Greater Bilbao

Government
  - Mayor: Esther Apraiz Fernández de la Peña (EAJ-PNV)

Area
  - Total: 7.4 km^{2} (2.9 sq mi)
- Elevation: 25 m (82 ft)

Population (2025-01-01)
  - Total: 7,294
  - Density: 990/km^{2} (2,600/sq mi)
- Demonym: Basque: deriotarra
- Time zone: UTC+1 (CET)
  - Summer (DST): UTC+2 (CEST)
- Postal code: 48160
- Official language(s): Basque; Spanish
- Website: Official website

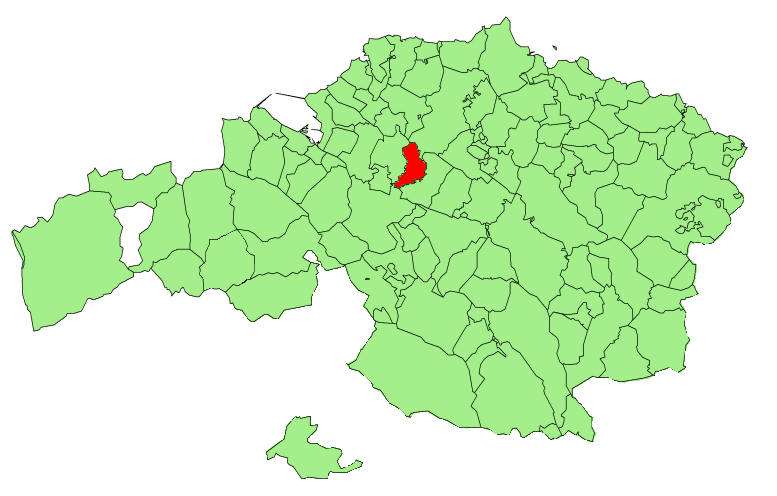
Location of Derio in Biscay

Derio is a town and municipality located in the province of Biscay, in the autonomous community of Basque Country, northern Spain. It is part of Greater Bilbao and was part of the municipality of Bilbao until 1983 and hosts Bilbao's biggest municipal cemetery. It has a population of 5,107 (2006). There is a Derio railway station and CD Derio football club.

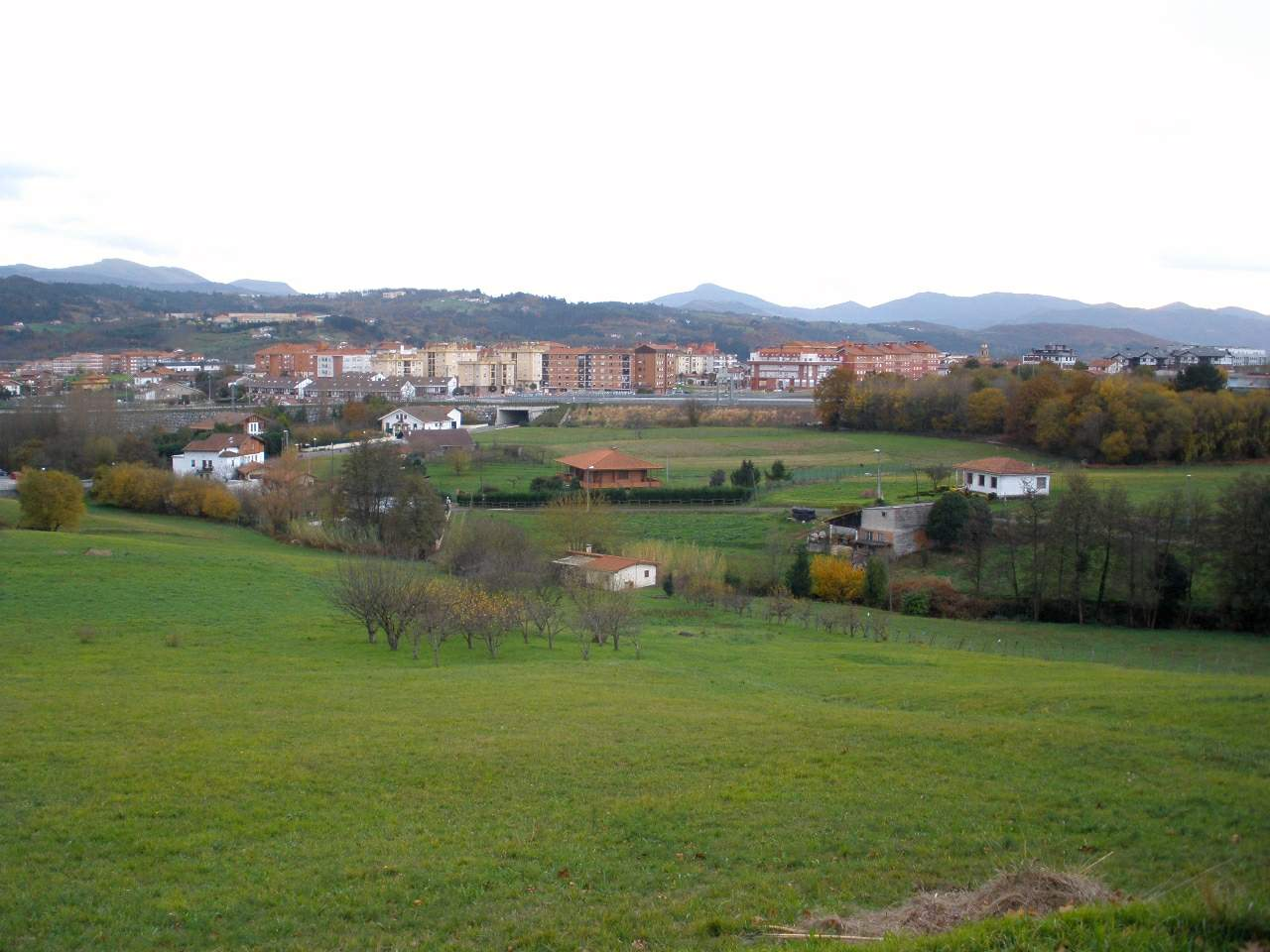

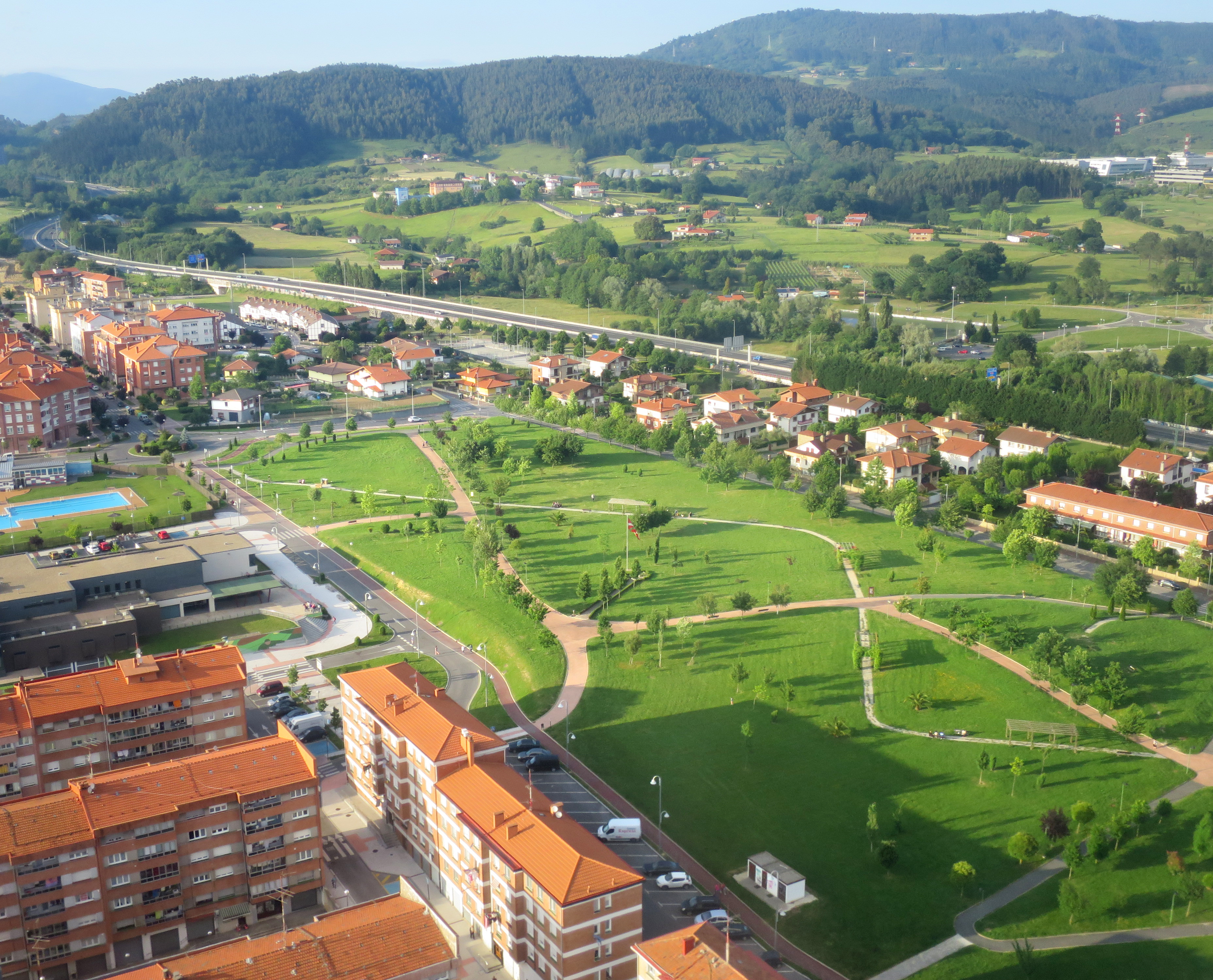

== Notable people ==
- Miren Basaras (Spanish microbiologist)
- Iñigo Vicente (Football player)
