= Ferrocarriles y Transportes Suburbanos =

Former railway operator

Compañía de los Ferrocarriles y Transportes Suburbanos de Bilbao, S. A.
- Type: Publicly listed
- Founded: 20 June 1947
- Defunct: 3 December 1983
- Successor: FEVE (1977); Euskotren (1982)
- Headquarters: Bilbao, Biscay, Spain
- Area served: Greater Bilbao

Ferrocarriles y Transportes Suburbanos (Spanish for 'Suburban Railways and Transport'), commonly known by its initialism FTS, was a railway company in the Basque Country, Spain. Founded in 1947 as the merger of various railway companies, it operated several suburban rail lines in the Greater Bilbao area. FEVE took over its operations in 1972, which in 1982 were transferred to the new company Basque Railways.

== History ==
FTS was founded in 1947 with the merger of two independent railways and two lines operated by another company:

- Lutxana–Mungia railway, an independent company.
- Bilbao–Lezama railway, an independent company.
- Bilbao–Las Arenas–Plentzia railway and the Matico–Azbarren branch, operated by the Bilbao–Santander Railway Company.

Aside from the railways, FTS also operated several tram and bus lines. The Bilbao–Plentzia line had been electrified since the 1920s, and shortly after the establishment of the new company the remaining non-electrified lines were electrified too.

The rolling stock was renovated starting in the 1950s, but by the 1960s the company was in financial difficulties. Rather than due to low ridership, they were caused by the artificially low fares imposed by the government, which didn't subsidize the company. In 1969, a landslide forced the closure of the Matico–Azbarren line and the relocation of the Bilbao–Lezama terminus out of central Bilbao. In 1975, due to the lengthening of the airport runway, most of the Lutxana–Mungia line had to close too. On 30 December 1977, FEVE took over the operations of the network.

Despite ceasing operations in 1977, the company wasn't immediately disbanded. In May 1983, after all the legal difficulties it faced were solved, the board of directors proposed the dissolution of the company, which happened in December that year.

== Rolling stock ==
After the merger, the new company inherited the rolling stock owned by its predecessors. The steam locomotives inherited from the Bilbao–Lezama and Lutxana–Mungia railways were retired soon after the merger, as since 1950 the whole FTS network was electrified.

=== Electric rolling stock ===
Class	Image	Type	In service	Number	Notes
MAB 1–12 (Carde y Escoriaza)		Railcar	1927–2011	12	A series of twelve railcars acquired at the time of the electrification of the Bilbao-Plentzia line. One of last trains of the series was retired from passenger service in 1986, and was used for auxiliary services until 1995. One unit was operated by Metro Bilbao, S.A. as service train until its scrapping in 2011.
MAB 13–15 (Carde y Escoriaza)		Railcar	1930–2012	3	Three railcars intended for freight transport, built in 1930 and originally numbered MD 1–3. They were reformed in the 1950s into passenger trains with new metal car bodies. The last one was retired from passenger service in 1995, and was used for auxiliary services until 2012.
MB 100 series		EMU	1965–1998	8	These EMUs were originally built between 1965 and 1975. They were refurbished between 1988 and 1991, becoming the Euskotren 3100 series. They were withdrawn from service in 1998.
MD 1–3 (Alsthom)		Railcar	1949–1970s	3	A total of seven railcars were built in 1930 by Alsthom for the Toulouse–Castres railway, which closed in 1939. Four of them were acquired by Ferrocarriles Vascongados, and the remaining three by Ferrocarriles y Transportes Suburbanos. After their arrival to FTS, they were refurbished with the wooden body cars of the original MD trains, and subsequently took over their numbering. The Alsthom railcars were used for freight services between Bilbao and Plentzia until the 1970s.
TU series		EMU	1954–2011	10	A series of ten two-car EMUs (a third car was added later). Retired in the early 1990s, one of them remained in the Bilbao Metro depot in Sopela until 2011, when it was scrapped.
