= Autopista AP-8 =

Road in Spain

Autopista AP-8
- Autopista del Cantábrico (Spanish); Kantauriko autobidea (Basque)

Route information
- Part of E5 / E70 / E80
- Length: 110.99 km (Note: The segment in Biscay is 31.05 km (19.29 mi), not including the Supersur. The segment in Gipuzkoa is 79.94 km (49.67 mi) long.) (68.97 mi)

Major junctions
- From: Irun
- To: Bilbao

Location
- Country: Spain
- Autonomous community: Basque Country
- Provinces: Biscay, Gipuzkoa

Highway system
- Highways in Spain; Autopistas and autovías; National Roads

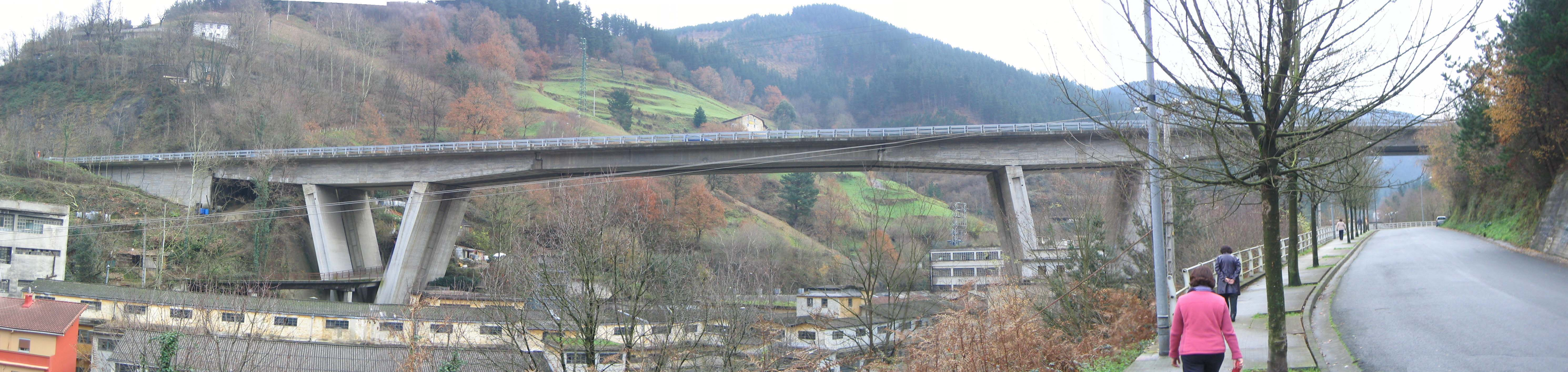
AP-8 viaduct in Eibar.

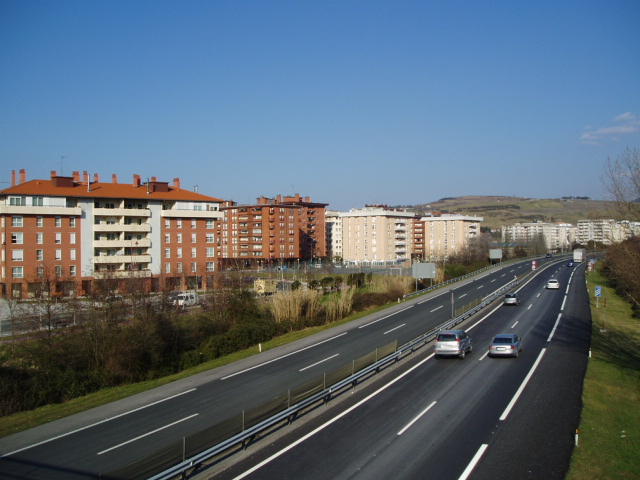
AP-8 in Zarauz.

The Autopista AP-8 is a toll autopista in the north of Spain, crossing the Basque Country from east to west. It is known as the Autopista del Cantábrico (Spanish for 'Motorway of the Cantabrian', Basque: Kantauriko autobidea) and connects the French border with Bilbao via San Sebastián, Zarautz, Eibar and Durango. At Bilbao the AP-8 continues as the toll-free Autovía A-8, which runs along the Spanish northern coast to Gijón and eventually the region of Galicia.

The first section of the AP-8 opened in 1971 between Amorebieta and Basauri. It was finished in 1976, with the opening of the international connection to the A63 autoroute in France. Additionally, the new southern ring road of Bilbao, designated as AP-8 and commonly known as the Supersur, opened in 2011.

== List of junctions ==
Location	Junction (km)	Destinations	Notes
Irun	0	N-121-A – Irun, Pamplona	Eastern terminus; continues north-east as the French A63
Irun	4	Irun	Eastbound exit and westbound entry only
Irun	7	Irun, Hondarribia	
Oiartzun	Área de Servicio	Oiartzun Truck Park	
Oiartzun	11	Oiartzun	Westbound exit and eastbound entry only
Donostia / San Sebastián	12	Donostia / San Sebastián, Errenteria	Eastern end of AP-1 concurrency
Astigarraga	Área de Servicio	Astigarraga	Eastbound only
Iruña / Pamplona	19	A-15 – Pamplona Donostia / San Sebastián, Astigarraga	
Herani	Área de Servicio		
Lasarte-Oria	24	N-1 – Lasarte-Oria	Westbound exit and eastbound entry only
Txikierdi Auzoa	27	Donostia / San Sebastián	Eastbound exit and westbound entry only
Orio	33	N-634 – Orio	Westbound exit and eastbound entry only
Zarautz	38	N-634 – Zarautz, Getaria	
Arroa Behea	48	N-634 – Zumaia Zestoa	
Itziar	54	N-634 – Itziar, Deba, Mutriku	
Elgoibar	64	N-634 – Elgoibar, Mendaro Azkoitia	
Maltzaga Auzoa	69	AP-1 – Bergara, Vitoria-Gasteiz	Western end of AP-1 concurrency.
Eibar	71	N-634 – Eibar	
Ermua	77	N-634 – Ermua	
Durango	84	N-636 – Elorrio N-634 – Abadiño, Berriz	
Iurreta	88	Iurreta, Durango	
Amorebieta-Etxano	97	Amorebieta-Etxano	Westbound exit only.
Amorebieta-Etxano	100	Amorebieta-Etxano	Junction and área de servicio
Kortederra Auzoa	103	N-637 – Bilbao, Barakaldo, Getxo	Westbound exit and eastbound only.
Erletxe	104	N-637 – Bilbao, Artxanda, Santander	Eastbound exit and westbound entry only.
Bekea	105	N-240 – Vitoria-Gasteiz N-634 – Galdakao	
Egia Auzoa	107	Galdakao	Eastbound exit and westbound entry only.
Olabarrieta Auzoa	109	N-634 – Bilbao	Westbound exit and eastbound entry only.
Urbi	110	AP-68 – Vitoria-Gasteiz, Burgos	Westbound exit and eastbound entry only.
Urbi	111	N-634 – Arrigorriaga, Basauri	Eastbound exit and westbound entry only.
Buia Auzoa	-	AP-68 – Vitoria-Gasteiz, Burgos	Eastbound exit and westbound entry only. Western terminus; continues west as the A-8
1.000 mi = 1.609 km; 1.000 km = 0.621 mi: Concurrency terminus; Incomplete access
