= List of Bienes de Interés Cultural in Gipuzkoa =

This is a list of Bien de Interés Cultural landmarks in Gipuzkoa, Spain.

== Bienes located in several municipalities ==
Bien de interés cultural located in several municipalities
Name of monument	BIC type	Type	Location	Coordinates	BIC#	Date	Image
Camino de Santiago	Conjunto histórico artístico	CH	Municipalities along the Camino	n/a	RI-53-0000035-00005	05 September 1962	

== Bienes by municipality ==
=== A ===
==== Andoain ====
Bienes de interés cultural in Andoain
Name of monument	BIC type	Type	Location	Coordinates	BIC#	Date	Image
Casa de Berrozpe	Monument	Civil architecture	Barrio de Kaletxiki	43.221691°N 2.017407°W	RI-51-0001460	17 January 1964	
Casa de Izturiaga	Monument	Civil architecture	Karrika Kalea	43.208397°N 2.031734°W	RI-51-0001461	17 January 1964	

==== Anoeta ====
Bien de interés cultural in Anoeta
Name of monument	BIC type	Type	Municipality	Coordinates	BIC#	Date	Image
Casa Consistorial de Anoeta	Monument	Civil architecture (in ruins)	Anoeta	43.161429°N 2.071086°W	RI-51-0001462	17 January 1964	

==== Aretxabaleta ====
Bien de interés cultural in Arechavaleta
Name of monument	BIC type	Type	Municipality	Coordinates	BIC#	Date	Image
Casa de Otalara	Monument	Civil architecture	Arechavaleta	43.027251°N 2.49231°W	RI-51-0001463	17 January 1964	n/a
Casas de Arratabe	Monument	Civil architecture	Arechavaleta	43.036376°N 2.50416°W	RI-51-0001464	17 January 1964	n/a
Casa de Aozaraza	Monument	Civil architecture	Aozaratza	43.025°N 2.487203°W	RI-51-0001465	17 January 1964	n/a
Casa de Cruz Terminal	Monument	Civil architecture	Arechavaleta	43.161429°N 2.071086°W	RI-51-0001466	17 January 1964	n/a

==== Aia ====
Bien de interés cultural in Aia
Name of monument	BIC type	Type	Municipality	Coordinates	BIC#	Date	Image
Cueva de Altxerri	Monument	Caves	Aia	43.268659°N 2.1349°W	RI-51-0005144	17 July 1984	n/a

==== Azkoitia ====
Bienes de interés cultural in Azkoitia
Name of monument	BIC type	Type	Municipality	Coordinates	BIC#	Date	Image
Casa de Insausti	Monument	Civil architecture	Azkoitia	43.177044°N 2.306529°W	RI-51-0001467	17 January 1964	
Casa de Idiaquez	Monument	Civil architecture	Azkoitia	43.178166°N 2.311271°W	RI-51-0001468	17 January 1964	
Casa de Isasaga	Monument	Civil architecture	Azkoitia	n/a	RI-51-0001469	17 January 1964	n/a
Casa de Portu	Monument	Civil architecture	Azkoitia	n/a	RI-51-0001470	17 January 1964	n/a
Casa-Torre de Floreaga	Monument	Civil architecture	Azkoitia	43.178913°N 2.312355°W	RI-51-0001471	17 January 1964	
Casa-Torre de Balda	Monument	Civil architecture	Azkoitia	43.179668°N 2.309673°W	RI-51-0001472	17 January 1964	
San José Hermitage	Monument	Civil architecture	Azkoitia	43.179221°N 2.307947°W	RI-51-0001473	17 January 1964	

==== Azpeitia ====
Bien de interés cultural in Azpeitia
Name of monument	BIC type	Type	Municipality	Coordinates	BIC#	Date	Image
Casa de Basozábal	Monument	Civil architecture	Azpeitia	43.184439°N 2.264386°W	RI-51-0001474	17 January 1964	
Casa de Enparan	Monument	Civil architecture	Azpeitia	43.184448°N 2.26282°W	RI-51-0001476	17 January 1964	
Casa del Hermano Gárate	Monument	Civil architecture	Azpeitia	43.173632°N 2.279913°W	RI-51-0001479	17 January 1964	
Ermita de la Magdalena (Azpeitia)	Monument	Religious architecture	Azpeitia	43.187816°N 2.263042°W	RI-51-0001477	17 January 1964	
Iglesia de San Sebastián de Soreasu	Monument	Religious architecture	Azpeitia	43.185878°N 2.26482°W	RI-51-0005134	17 July 1984	
Palacio Antxieta	Monument	Civil architecture	Azpeitia	43.18555°N 2.264423°W	RI-51-0001475	17 January 1964	
Puente Viejo	Monument	Civil architecture	Azpeitia	43.184504°N 2.263330°W	RI-51-0001482	17 January 1964	
Casa de Altuna (reconstruction)	Monument	Civil architecture	Azpeitia	43.184081°N 2.265602°W	RI-51-0001478	17 January 1964	n/a
Santuario de Loyola	Monument	Civil architecture	Azpeitia	43.174447°N 2.282778°W	RI-51-0001480	17 January 1964	
Casa Plateresca de la Calle de la Iglesia	Monument	Civil architecture	Calle de Eliz	43.184597°N 2.265271°W	RI-51-0001481	17 January 1964	n/a

=== B ===
==== Beasain ====
Bien de interés cultural in Beasain
Name of monument	BIC type	Type	Municipality	Coordinates	BIC#	Date	Image
Casa de Yarza	Monument	Civil architecture	Beasain	43.047369°N 2.209261°W	RI-51-0001483	17 January 1964	

==== Berástegui (Berastegi) ====
Bien de interés cultural in Beasain
Name of monument	BIC type	Type	Municipality	Coordinates	BIC#	Date	Image
Torre de Berástegui	Monument	Civil architecture	Berastegi	43.124201°N 1.984213°W	RI-51-0001484	17 January 1964	n/a

=== C ===
==== Cestona ====
Bienes de interés cultural in Cestona
Name of monument	BIC type	Type	Municipality	Coordinates	BIC#	Date	Image
Arcos de entrada de la villa	Monument	Defence architecture	Cestona	43.240085°N 2.25824°W	RI-51-0001488	17 January 1964	
Casa Consistorial	Monument	Civil architecture	Cestona	43.239957°N 2.25874°W	RI-51-0001486	17 January 1964	
Casa de Lili	Monument	Civil architecture	Cestona	43.237901°N 2.260496°W	RI-51-0001487	17 January 1964	

=== D ===
==== Deva ====
Bien de interés cultural in Deva
Name of monument	BIC type	Type	Municipality	Coordinates	BIC#	Date	Image
Cueva de Ekain	Monument	Cave	Colina de Ekain, Deva	43.237008°N 2.279299°W	RI-51-0001483	17 July 1984	
Iglesia de Santa María la Real	Monument	Civil architecture	Deva	43.294789°N 2.35343°W	RI-51-0000615	3 June 1931	
Palacio Aguirre	Monument	Civil architecture	Deva	43.2922°N 2.3559°W	RI-51-0001489	17 January 1964	
Casa de Irarrazábal	Monument	Civil architecture	Deva	43.290245°N 2.362992°W	RI-51-0001490	17 January 1964	
Sasiola ruinas	Monument	Civil architecture	Sasiola, Deva	43.273159°N 2.37142°W	RI-51-0001491	17 January 1964	

=== E ===
==== Elgoibar ====
Bien de interés cultural in Elgoibar
Name of monument	BIC type	Type	Municipality	Coordinates	BIC#	Date	Image
Casa de Olaso	Monument	Civil architecture	Elgoibar	n/a	RI-51-0001495	17 January 1964	n/a
Casa de Carquizano	Historical grouping	Historical town	Elgoibar	n/a	RI-51-0001496	17 January 1964	n/a
Casa Consistorial	Monument	Civil architecture	Elgoibar	43.214354°N 2.417105°W	RI-51-0001497	17 January 1964	
Pórtico del Cementerio (formerly the Iglesia de San Bartolomé de Olaso)	Monument	Civil architecture	Elgoibar	43.209348°N 2.420356°W	RI-51-0001498	17 January 1964	

=== G ===
==== Guetaria ====
Bien de interés cultural in Guetaria
Name of monument	BIC type	Type	Municipality	Coordinates	BIC#	Date	Image
Church of San Salvador	Monument	Civil architecture	Guetaria	43.305038°N 2.203357°W	RI-51-0000067	1 June 1895	
Casco Histórico de Getaria	Historical grouping	Historical town	Guetaria	43.304241°N 2.203921°W	RI-53-0000121	14 January 1971	
Casas de la calle de los Almirantes	Monument	Civil architecture	Guetaria	43.304241°N 2.203921°W	RI-51-0001509	17 January 1964	

=== Z ===
==== Zegama ====
Bien de interés cultural in Zegama
Name of monument	BIC type	Type	Municipality	Coordinates	BIC#	Date	Image
Casa mortuoria de Zumalacárregui	Monument	Civil architecture	Zegama	42.9753°N 2.2894°W	RI-51-0001485	17 January 1964	n/a
