= Arroa station =

Railway station in Zestoa, Basque Country, Spain

Arroa

General information
- Location: Zestoa, Gipuzkoa; Spain
- Coordinates: 43°16′42″N 2°16′15″W
- Owner: Euskal Trenbide Sarea
- Operator: Euskotren
- Line: Line E1
- Platforms: 1 side platform
- Tracks: 2

Construction
- Structure type: At-grade
- Parking: No
- Accessible: Yes

Services
Preceding station	Euskotren Trena	Following station
Deba towards Matiko	Line E1	Zumaia towards Pasaia
Location

Arroa is a railway station in Zestoa, Basque Country, Spain. It is owned by Euskal Trenbide Sarea and operated by Euskotren. It lies on the Bilbao–San Sebastián line.

== History ==
The Zarautz-Deba stretch in which the station is located opened in 1901, as part of the San Sebastián-Elgoibar railway. The Urola railway had a nearby but distinct station of the same name until its closure in 1986.

== Services ==
The station is served by Euskotren Trena line E1. Trains (in both directions) run every hour throughout the week.
