= Zumaia station =

Railway station in Zumaia, Basque Country, Spain

Zumaia
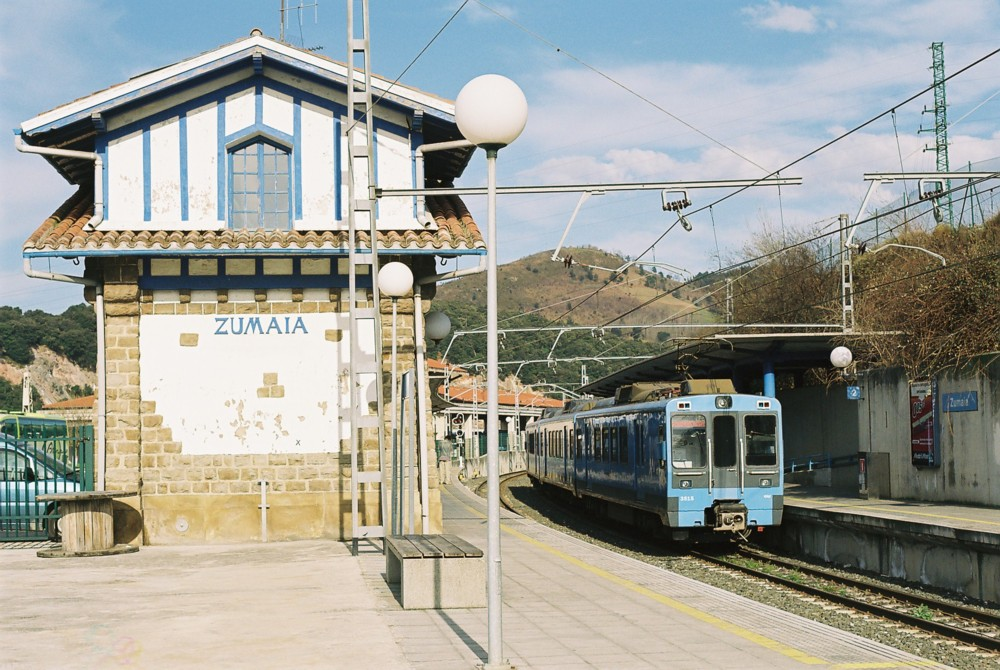
- View of the station

General information
- Location: Zumaia, Gipuzkoa; Spain
- Coordinates: 43°17′30″N 2°15′07″W
- Owner: Euskal Trenbide Sarea
- Operator: Euskotren
- Line: Line E1
- Platforms: 2 side platforms
- Tracks: 2

Construction
- Structure type: At-grade
- Parking: Yes
- Accessible: Partial

History
- Opened: 1 January 1901

Services
Preceding station	Euskotren Trena	Following station
Arroa towards Matiko	Line E1	Zarautz towards Pasaia
Location

Zumaia is a railway station in Zumaia, Basque Country, Spain. It is owned by Euskal Trenbide Sarea and operated by Euskotren. It lies on the Bilbao–San Sebastián line.

== History ==
The station opened in 1901 as part of the Zarautz-Deba stretch of the San Sebastián-Elgoibar railway. The line was extended to Deba two years later. The current station building dates from 1926. Originally, it served the Urola railway, with the Bilbao-San Sebastián tracks to the north of it. The Urola railway closed in 1986, and in 1997 the tracks of the Bilbao–San Sebastián line were moved to the position of the former Urola tracks. The viaduct over the Urola river next to the station was the site of a train crash in 1941 that killed 22 people.

== Services ==
The station is served by Euskotren Trena line E1. Trains to and from Amara (in San Sebastián) run every 30 minutes during weekdays, and every hour during weekends. In the other direction (towards Matiko, Bilbao), trains run every hour throughout the week.
