= Toletxegain station =

Railway station in Elgoibar, Basque Country, Spain

Toletxegain
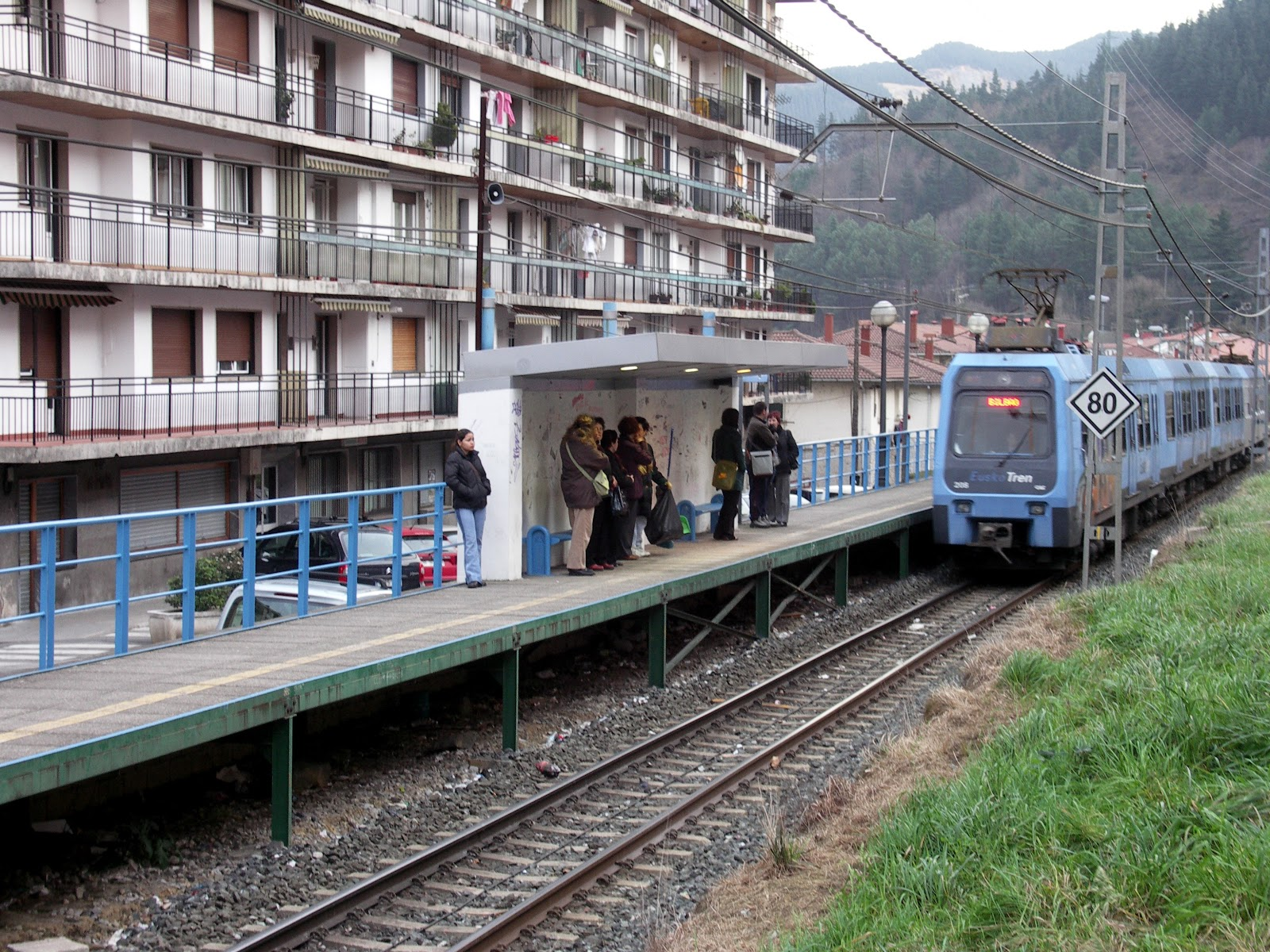
- A 200 series train entering the station

General information
- Location: Elgoibar, Gipuzkoa; Spain
- Coordinates: 43°13′03″N 2°24′32″W
- Owner: Euskal Trenbide Sarea
- Operator: Euskotren
- Line: Line E1
- Platforms: 1 side platform
- Tracks: 1

Construction
- Structure type: At-grade
- Parking: No
- Accessible: Yes

Other information
- Fare zone: Zone 5

Services
Preceding station	Euskotren Trena	Following station
Elgoibar towards Matiko	Line E1	Altzola towards Pasaia
Location

Toletxegain is a railway station in Elgoibar, Basque Country, Spain. It is owned by Euskal Trenbide Sarea and operated by Euskotren. It lies on the Bilbao–San Sebastián line.

== History ==
The Elgoibar-Deba stretch in which the station is located opened in 1893, as part of the San Sebastián-Elgoibar railway. The station was reformed in 2009.

== Services ==
The station is served by Euskotren Trena line E1. Trains (in both directions) run every hour throughout the week.
