= Aia-Orio station =

Railway station in Aia, Basque Country, Spain

Aia-Orio
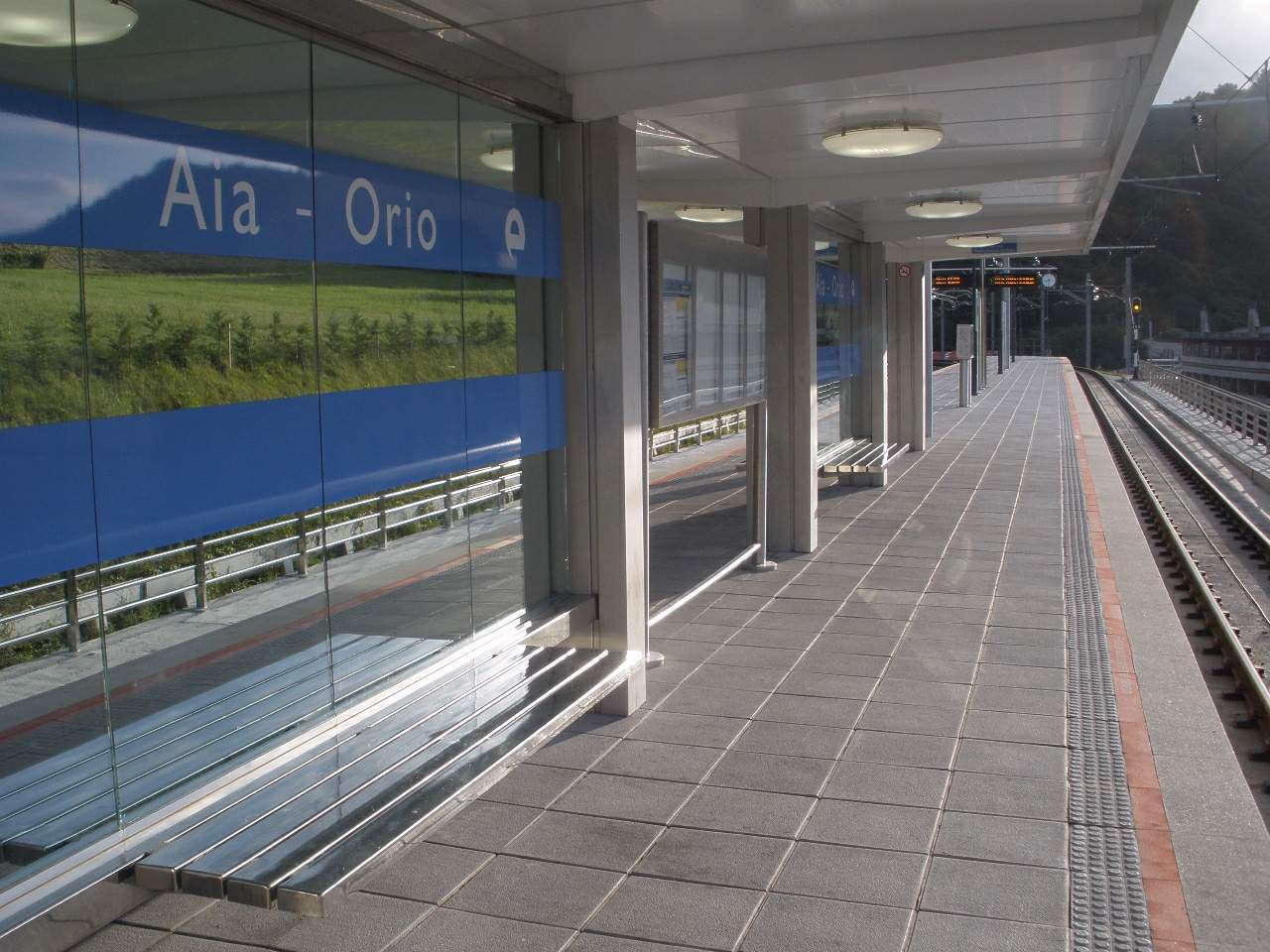
- View of the platform

General information
- Location: Aia, Gipuzkoa; Spain
- Coordinates: 43°16′27″N 2°07′33″W
- Owner: Euskal Trenbide Sarea
- Operator: Euskotren
- Line: Line E1
- Platforms: 1 island platform
- Tracks: 2

Construction
- Structure type: Elevated
- Parking: No
- Accessible: Yes

History
- Opened: 9 April 1895
- Rebuilt: 18 October 2010

Services
Preceding station	Euskotren Trena	Following station
San Pelaio towards Matiko	Line E1	Usurbil towards Pasaia
Location

Aia-Orio is a railway station in Aia, Basque Country, Spain; serving primarily the town of Orio. It is owned by Euskal Trenbide Sarea and operated by Euskotren. It lies on the Bilbao–San Sebastián line.

== History ==
The station opened in 1895 as part of the San Sebastián-Zarautz stretch of the San Sebastián-Elgoibar railway. The new elevated station opened in 2010. The works included the doubling of a 1.7 km (1.1 mi) stretch of the line.

== Services ==
The station is served by Euskotren Trena line E1. It runs every 30 minutes (in each direction) during weekdays, and every hour during weekends.
