= Altzola station =

Railway station in Elgoibar, Basque Country, Spain

Altzola

General information
- Location: Elgoibar, Gipuzkoa; Spain
- Coordinates: 43°14′09″N 2°23′58″W
- Owner: Euskal Trenbide Sarea
- Operator: Euskotren
- Line: Line E1
- Platforms: 1 side platform
- Tracks: 1

Construction
- Structure type: At-grade
- Parking: No
- Accessible: No

Other information
- Fare zone: Zone 5

Services
| Preceding station | Euskotren Trena | Following station |
|---|---|---|
| Toletxegain towards Matiko | Line E1 | Mendaro towards Pasaia |
Location

Altzola is a railway station in Elgoibar, Basque Country, Spain. It is owned by Euskal Trenbide Sarea and operated by Euskotren. It lies on the Bilbao–San Sebastián line.

== History ==
The Elgoibar-Deba stretch in which the station is located opened in 1893, as part of the San Sebastián-Elgoibar railway. The station was damaged in 2014, when a small landslide destroyed the station shelter. The single track section of the line in which the station is located will be replaced by a new double-track tunnel which started construction in 2023. Due to the low usage of the station, the Basque Government has no plans to rebuild the station after the closure of the current single track section.

== Services ==
The station is served by Euskotren Trena line E1. Only four trains (in each direction) call at the station per day, with most trains on the line skipping it.
