= Mendaro station =

Railway station in Mendaro, Basque Country, Spain

Mendaro

General information
- Location: Mendaro, Gipuzkoa; Spain
- Coordinates: 43°15′08″N 2°23′17″W
- Owner: Euskal Trenbide Sarea
- Operator: Euskotren
- Line: Line E1
- Platforms: 1 island platform, 1 side platform
- Tracks: 3

Construction
- Structure type: At-grade
- Parking: No
- Accessible: Yes

Other information
- Fare zone: Zone 5

Services
| Preceding station | Euskotren Trena | Following station |
|---|---|---|
| Altzola towards Matiko | Line E1 | Deba towards Pasaia |
Location

Mendaro is a railway station in Mendaro, Basque Country, Spain. It is owned by Euskal Trenbide Sarea and operated by Euskotren. It lies on the Bilbao–San Sebastián line.

== History ==
The Elgoibar-Deba stretch in which the station is located opened in 1893, as part of the San Sebastián-Elgoibar railway. Works for the rebuilding of the station started in late 2021. The platforms will be widened and the level crossing will be substituted by elevators as part of the reform.

== Services ==
The station is served by Euskotren Trena line E1. Trains (in both directions) run every hour throughout the week.
