= Añorga station =

Railway station in San Sebastián, Basque Country, Spain

Añorga
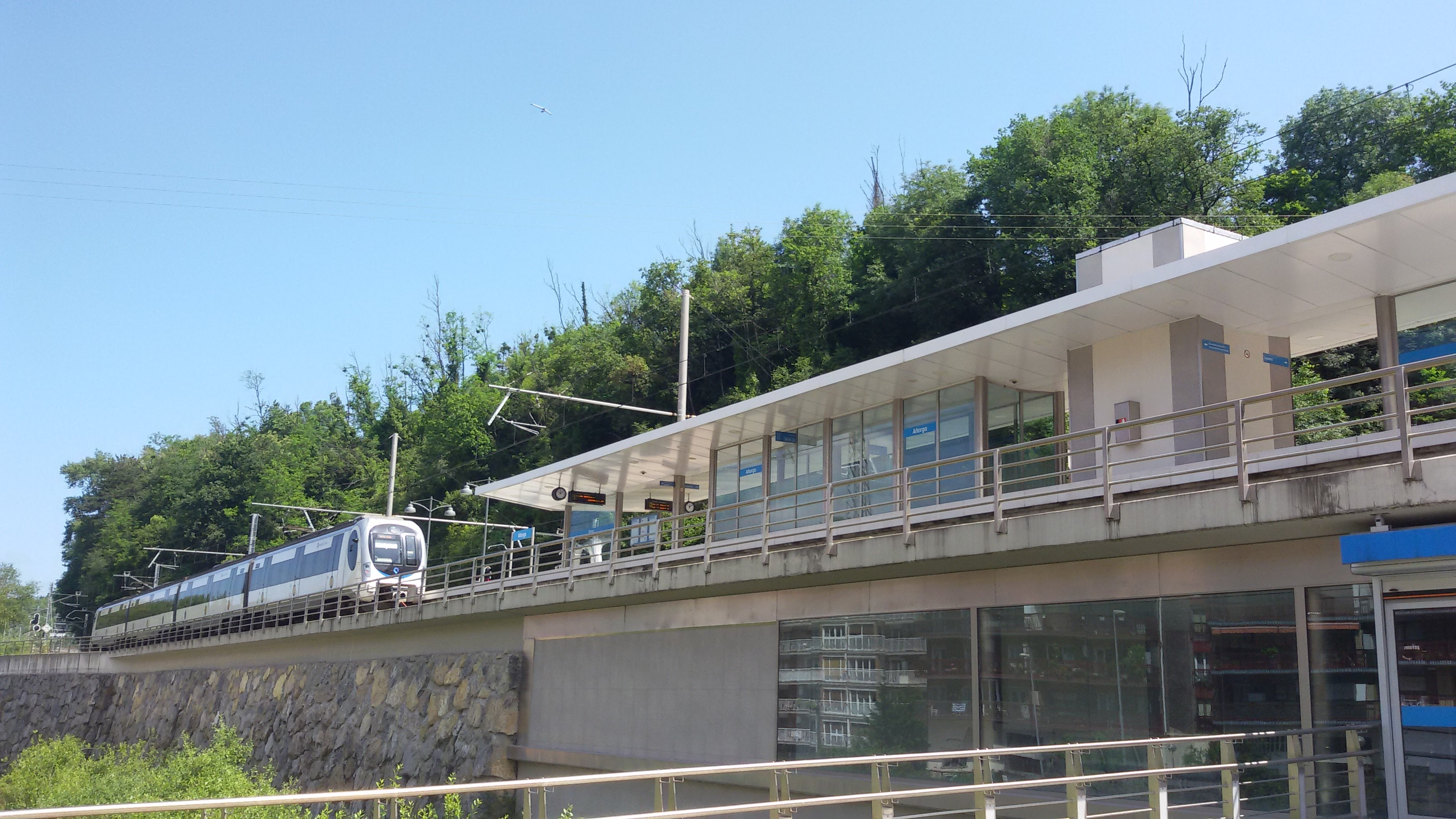
- A 900 series train leaving the station

General information
- Location: San Sebastián, Gipuzkoa; Spain
- Coordinates: 43°17′30″N 1°59′41″W
- Owner: Euskal Trenbide Sarea
- Operator: Euskotren
- Lines: Line E1; Line T1
- Platforms: 1 island platform
- Tracks: 2

Construction
- Structure type: At-grade
- Parking: No
- Accessible: Yes

History
- Opened: 9 April 1895
- Rebuilt: 10 April 2012

Services
Preceding station	Euskotren Trena	Following station
Errekalde towards Matiko	Line E1	Lugaritz towards Pasaia
Errekalde towards Lasarte-Oria	Line T1	Lugaritz towards Hendaia
Location

Añorga is a railway station in San Sebastián, Basque Country, Spain. It is owned by Euskal Trenbide Sarea and operated by Euskotren. It lies on the Bilbao–San Sebastián line and is also served by the suburban Topo service.

== History ==
The station opened in 1895 as part of the San Sebastián-Zarautz stretch of the San Sebastián-Elgoibar railway. The current station opened in 2012, as part of the complete renovation and doubling of the line between Añorga and Usurbil.

== Services ==
The station is served by Euskotren Trena lines E1 and E2. Line E2 runs every 15 minutes (in each direction) during weekdays, and every 30 minutes during weekends. Line E1 runs every 30 minutes (in each direction) during weekdays, and every hour during weekends.
