= Usurbil station =

Railway station in Usurbil, Basque Country, Spain

Usurbil
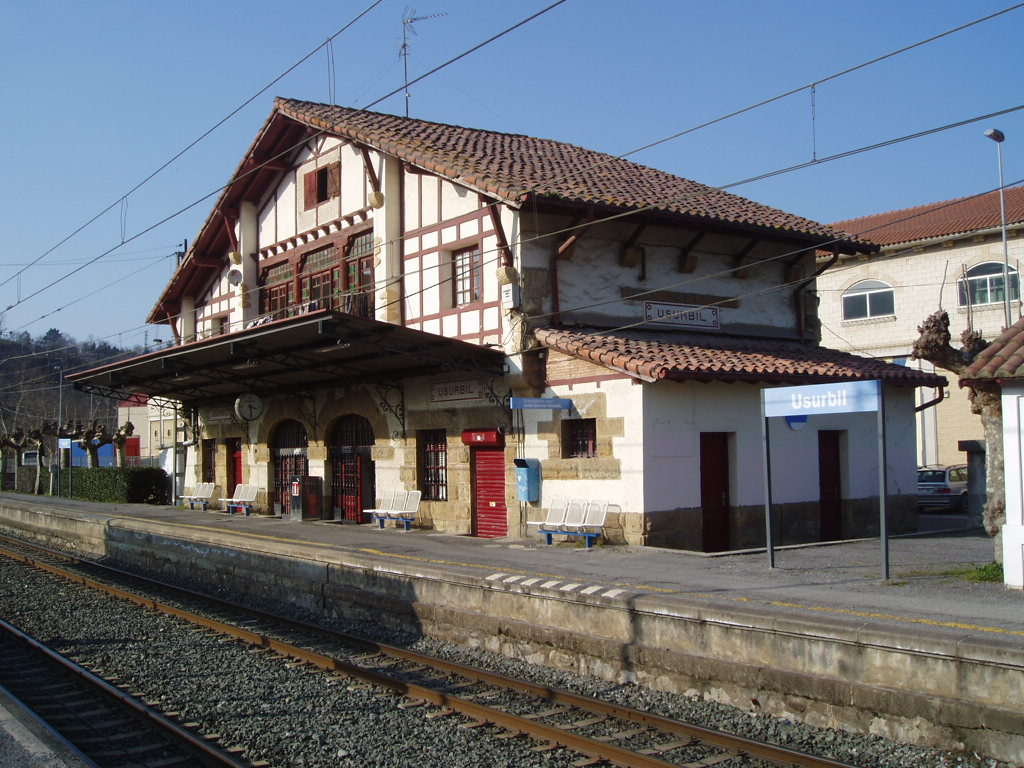
- View of the station

General information
- Location: Usurbil, Gipuzkoa; Spain
- Coordinates: 43°16′07″N 2°03′11″W
- Owner: Euskal Trenbide Sarea
- Operator: Euskotren
- Line: Line E1
- Platforms: 1 island platform, 1 side platform
- Tracks: 3

Construction
- Structure type: At-grade
- Parking: No
- Accessible: Yes

History
- Opened: 9 April 1895

Services
Preceding station	Euskotren Trena	Following station
Aia-Orio towards Matiko	Line E1	Errekalde towards Pasaia
Location

Usurbil is a railway station in Usurbil, Basque Country, Spain. It is owned by Euskal Trenbide Sarea and operated by Euskotren. It lies on the Bilbao–San Sebastián line.

== History ==
The station first opened in 1895 as part of the San Sebastián-Zarautz stretch of the San Sebastián-Elgoibar railway. In 2022, plans were announced to rebuild the station closer to the main urban area, with the project also including the removal of three level crossings. As of May 2025, the works are expected to be completed by late 2025 or early 2026.

== Services ==
The station is served by Euskotren Trena line E1. It runs every 30 minutes (in each direction) during weekdays, and every hour during weekends.
