= Zarautz station =

Railway station in Zarautz, Basque Country, Spain

Zarautz
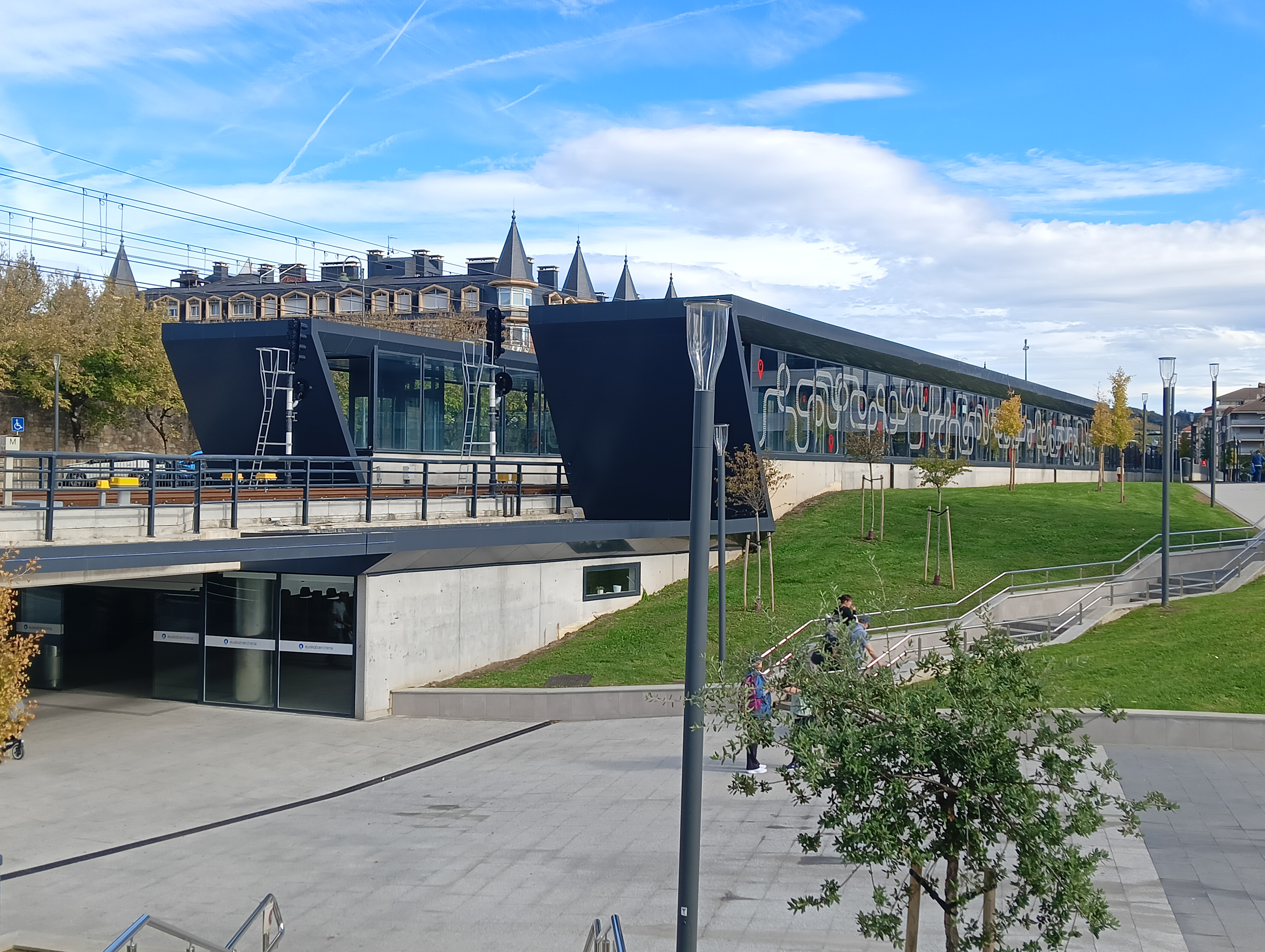
- View of the station

General information
- Location: Zarautz, Gipuzkoa; Spain
- Coordinates: 43°17′04″N 2°10′16″W
- Owner: Euskal Trenbide Sarea
- Operator: Euskotren
- Line: Line E1
- Platforms: 2 side platforms
- Tracks: 2

Construction
- Structure type: At-grade
- Parking: No
- Accessible: Yes

History
- Opened: 9 April 1895

Services
Preceding station	Euskotren Trena	Following station
Zumaia towards Matiko	Line E1	San Pelaio towards Pasaia
Location

Zarautz is a railway station in Zarautz, Basque Country, Spain. It is owned by Euskal Trenbide Sarea and operated by Euskotren. It lies on the Bilbao–San Sebastián line.

== History ==
The station opened in 1895 as part of the San Sebastián-Zarautz stretch of the San Sebastián-Elgoibar railway. The line was extended to Deba in 1901. Starting in 2022, the station was rebuilt together with the neighboring San Pelaio station. As the new station was built at the same location as the old one, a provisional station entered service in June 2022 slightly to the east of the original one. The new station entered service in 2024.

== Services ==
The station is served by Euskotren Trena line E1. It runs every 30 minutes (in each direction) during weekdays, and every hour during weekends.
