= Deba station =

Railway station in Deba, Basque Country, Spain

Deba
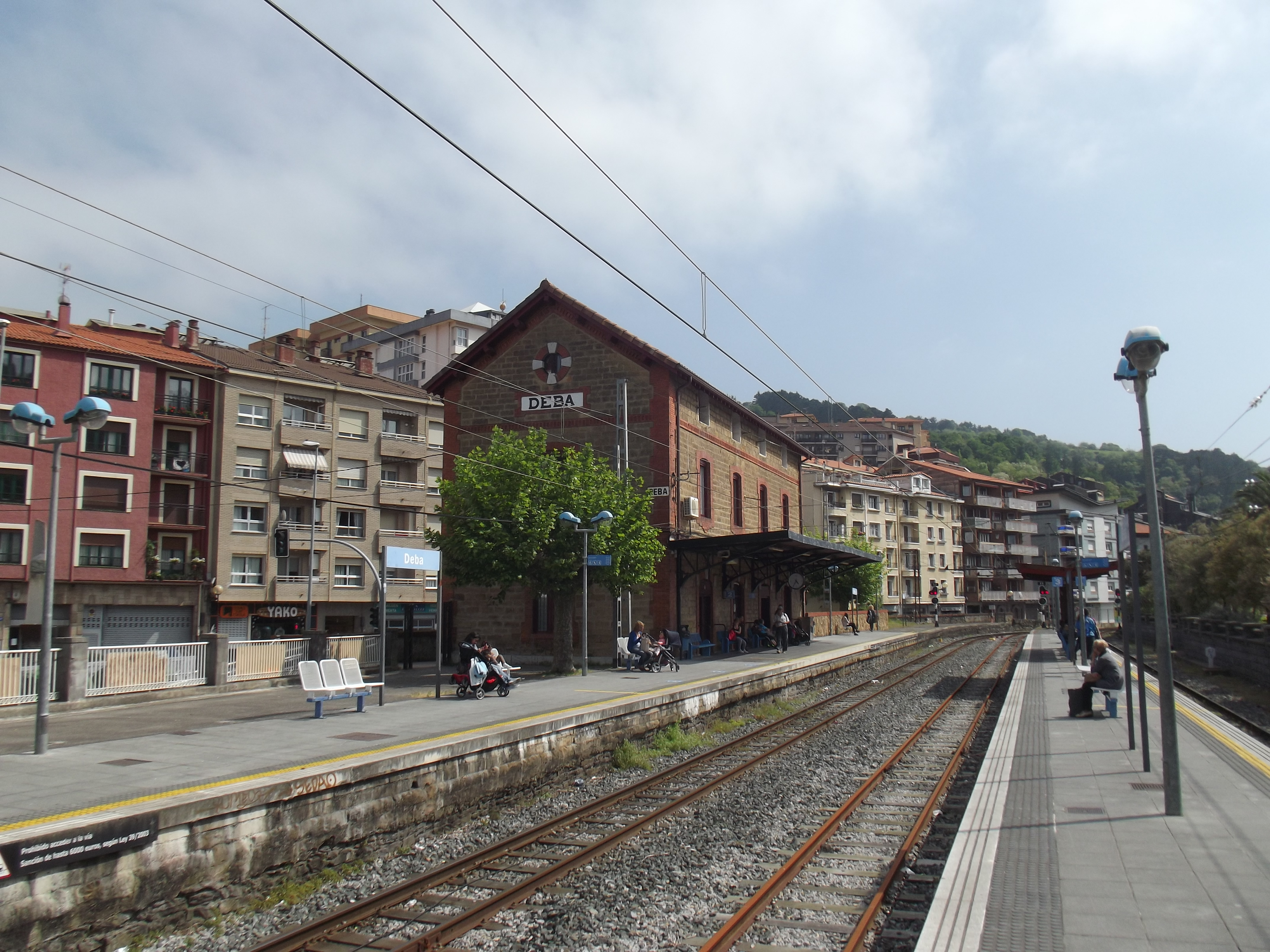
- View of the station

General information
- Location: Deba, Gipuzkoa; Spain
- Coordinates: 43°17′37″N 2°21′20″W
- Owner: Euskal Trenbide Sarea
- Operator: Euskotren
- Line: Line E1
- Platforms: 1 island platform, 1 side platform
- Tracks: 3

Construction
- Structure type: At-grade
- Parking: No
- Accessible: Yes

Other information
- Fare zone: Zone 5

History
- Opened: 3 August 1893

Services
| Preceding station | Euskotren Trena | Following station |
|---|---|---|
| Mendaro towards Matiko | Line E1 | Arroa towards Pasaia |
Location

Deba is a railway station in Deba, Basque Country, Spain. It is owned by Euskal Trenbide Sarea and operated by Euskotren. It lies on the Bilbao–San Sebastián line.

== History ==
The station opened in 1893 as part of the Elgoibar-Deba stretch of the San Sebastián-Elgoibar railway. The line was extended to Zarautz (and thus to San Sebastián) in 1901.

== Services ==
The station is served by Euskotren Trena line E1. Trains (in both directions) run every hour throughout the week.
