= Agorregi Forge =

Coordinates: 43.2469°N 2.1534°W

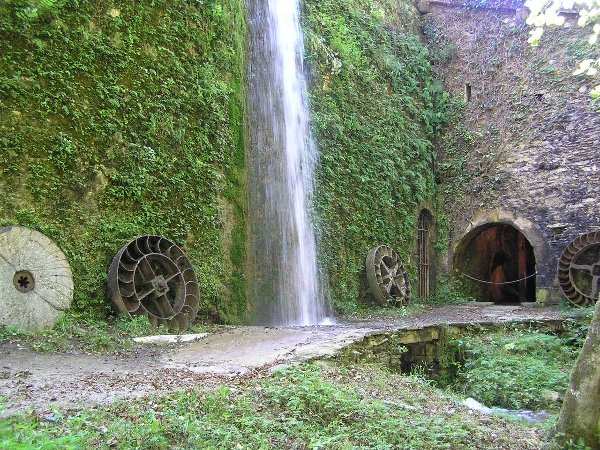
Agorregi Forge, near Aia, Gipuzkoa Province

The Agorregi Forge is located within the Pagoeta Nature Reserve, near the town of Aia, in the Basque Province of Gipuzkoa, Spain. It is one of the best preserved examples of a foundry in Gipuzkoa province. The forge which can be seen today is a built in 1754 by the lord of Laurgain Palace over the ruins of an earlier version. Lying at the bottom of a deep valley near Manterola farmhouse, it used the river's hydraulic energy to power its great bellows and turn its waterwheels.
