= Santander =

Santander may refer to:

== Places ==
- Santander, Spain, a port city and capital of the autonomous community of Cantabria, Spain
- Santander Department, a department of Colombia
- Santander State, former state of Colombia
- Santander de Quilichao, a municipality in the Cauca Department of Colombia
- Santander, Cebu, a municipality in the province of Cebu, Philippines

== Banking ==
- Banco Santander, a Spanish banking group
  - Santander Bank, its US subsidiary
  - Santander UK, its British subsidiary
  - Santander Bank Polska, its Polish subsidiary

== People ==
- Anthony Santander (born 1994), Venezuelan professional baseball outfielder
- Carlos Santander (born 1994), Venezuelan swimmer
- Efraín Santander (1941–2026), Chilean footballer
- Federico Santander (born 1991), Paraguayan footballer
- Francisco de Paula Santander (1792–1840), Colombian military and political leader born in Cúcuta
- Gustavo Santander, Colombian composer and brother of Kike Santander
- John Santander (born 1994), Chilean footballer
- Kike Santander (born 1960), Colombian composer and record producer born in Santiago de Cali
- Luis Enrique Santander (born 1983), Mexican football referee
- Luis José Santander (born 1960), Venezuelan actor

== Ships ==
- SS Santander, a Hansa A Type cargo ship in service 1943–1945
- Santander 30, a British sailboat

== Historical events ==
- Battle of Santander, a set of 1937 military operations carried out during the Spanish Civil War
- 1941 Santander fire, a fire in the city of Santander, Cantabria, Spain

== See also ==
- Norte de Santander Department, a department of Colombia
- Puerto Santander (disambiguation)
- Emeterius and Celedonius, Christian saints, the first of which is according to legend the source of the name Santander
