= Mendaro =

Mendaro may refer to:

== People ==
=== Surname ===
- Pedro Mendaro (1909–1964), Spanish footballer
- Martín Mendaro (born 1973), former Uruguayan rugby union player

=== Given name ===
- Mendaro Txirristaka

== Places ==
- Mendaro, Spain, town and municipality located in the province of Gipuzkoa, Spain
- Mendaro station, a railway station in Mendaro
