= Lastur =

Human settlement in Spain

Coordinates: 43.25°N 2.33°W

- Neighbourhood
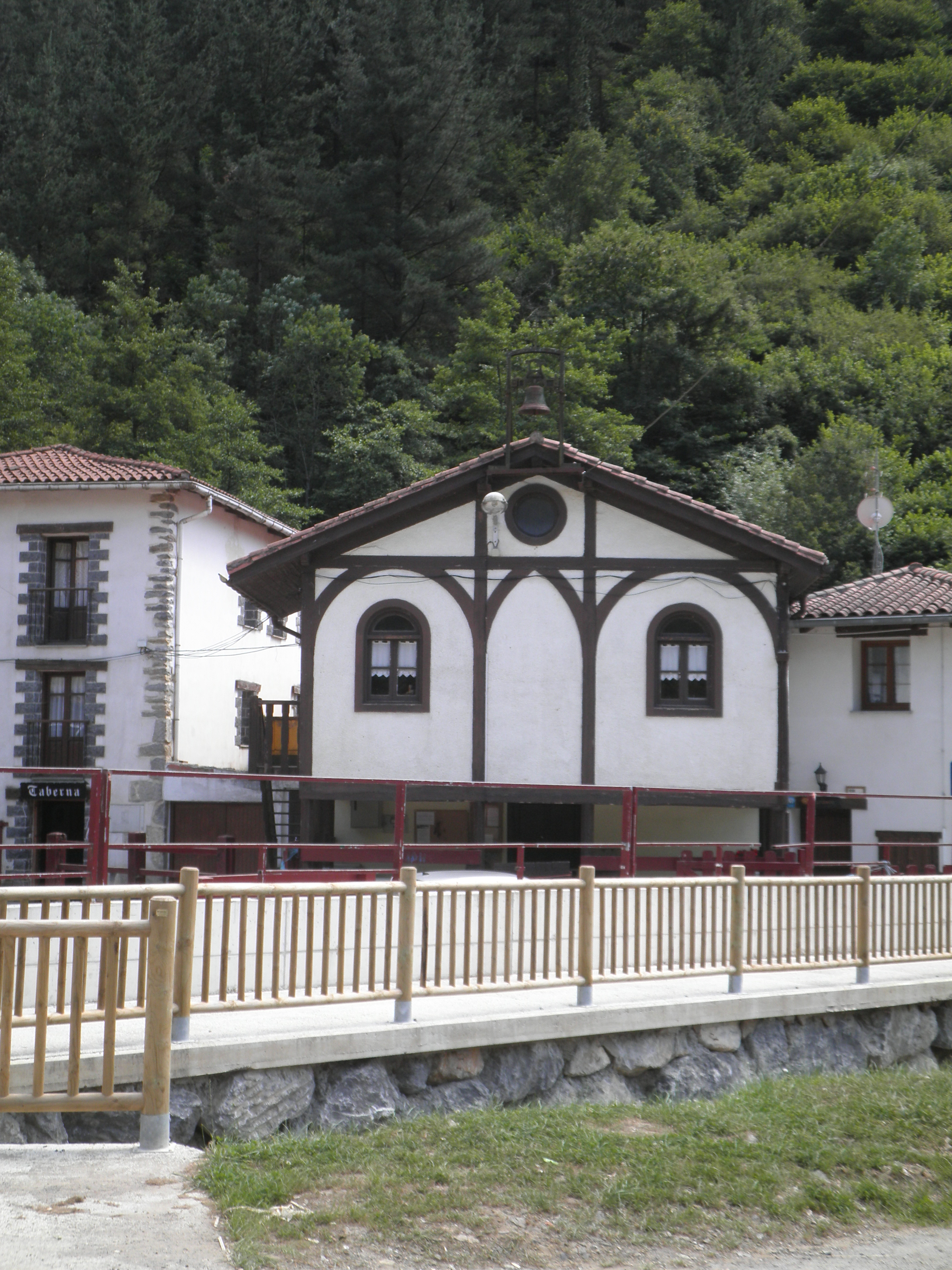
- The centre of Lastur
- Interactive map of Lastur
- Country: Spain
- Autonomous Community: Basque Country
- Municipality: Deba

Population (2018)
  - Total: 197

Lastur is a neighborhood of Deba, Gipuzkoa, Spain.
