= San Pelaio station =

Railway station in Zarautz, Basque Country, Spain

San Pelaio
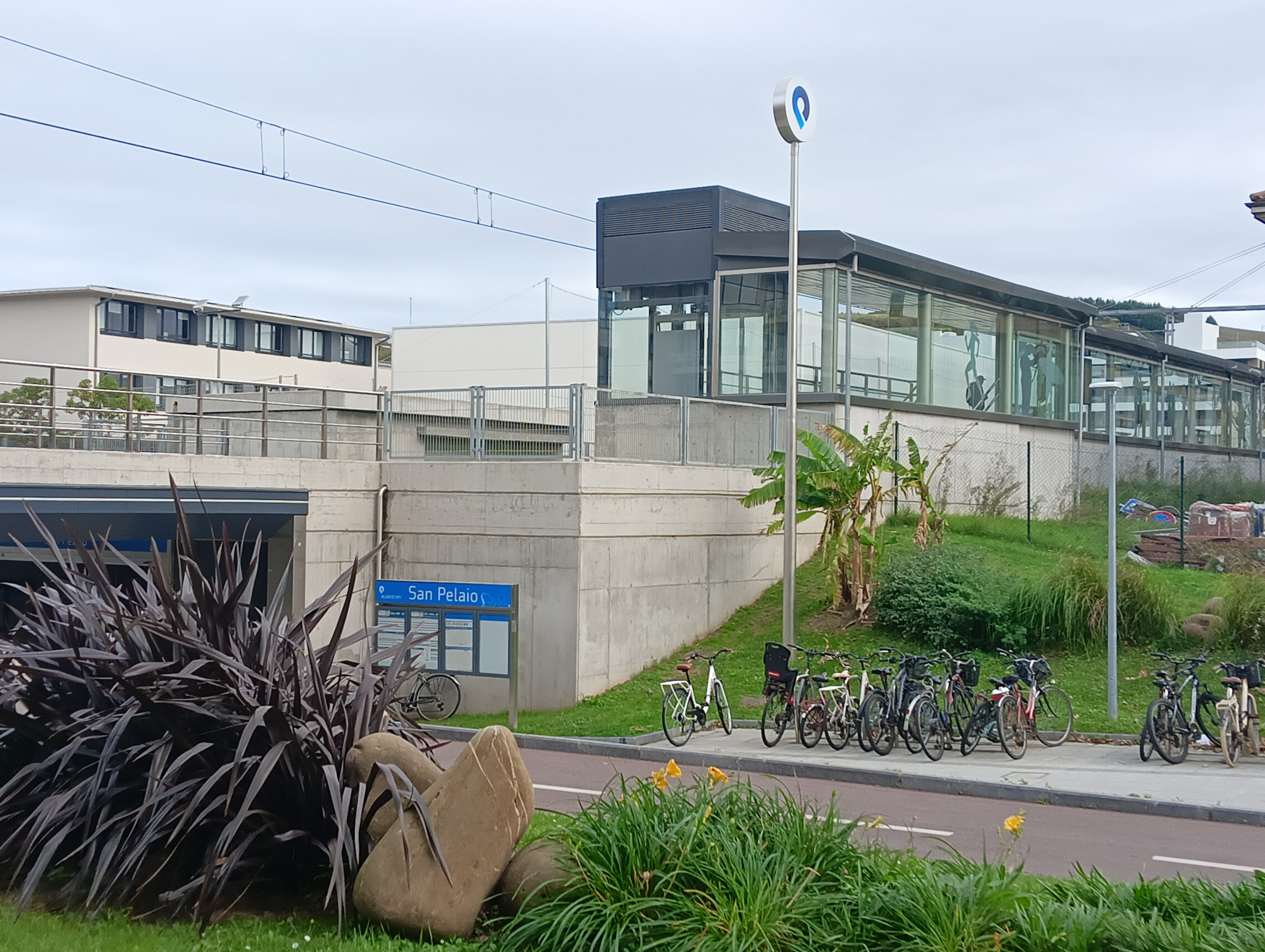
- View of the station

General information
- Location: Zarautz, Gipuzkoa; Spain
- Coordinates: 43°17′00″N 2°09′36″W
- Owner: Euskal Trenbide Sarea
- Operator: Euskotren
- Line: Line E1
- Platforms: 1 side platform
- Tracks: 1

Construction
- Structure type: At-grade
- Parking: No
- Accessible: Partial

Services
Preceding station	Euskotren Trena	Following station
Zarautz towards Matiko	Line E1	Aia-Orio towards Pasaia
Location

San Pelaio is a railway station in Zarautz, Basque Country, Spain. It is owned by Euskal Trenbide Sarea and operated by Euskotren. It lies on the Bilbao–San Sebastián line.

== History ==
The station was temporarily closed in June 2022 for renovations, and reopened in August 2023. During that time, the platform was widened and lengthened, and the station underpass was rebuilt.

== Services ==
The station is served by Euskotren Trena line E1. It runs every 30 minutes (in each direction) during weekdays, and every hour during weekends.
