= Lugaritz station =

Railway station in San Sebastián, Basque Country, Spain

Lugaritz
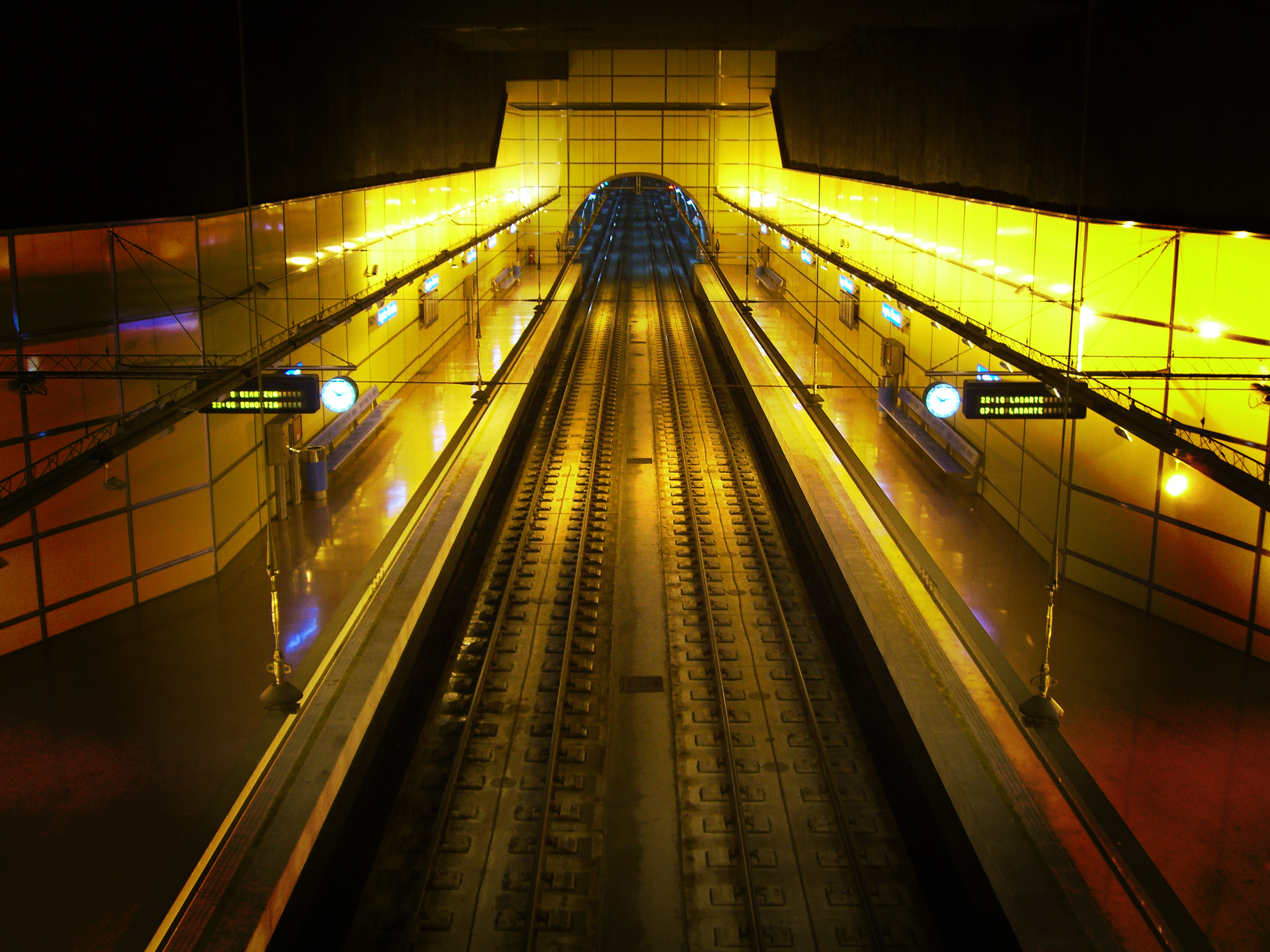
- View of the platforms from the mezzanine

General information
- Location: San Sebastián, Gipuzkoa; Spain
- Coordinates: 43°18′09″N 2°00′03″W
- Owner: Euskal Trenbide Sarea
- Operator: Euskotren
- Lines: Line E1; Line T1
- Platforms: 2 side platforms
- Tracks: 2

Construction
- Structure type: Underground
- Parking: No
- Accessible: Yes

History
- Opened: 10 March 2005

Services
Preceding station	Euskotren Trena	Following station
Añorga towards Matiko	Line E1	Bentaberri towards Pasaia
Añorga towards Lasarte-Oria	Line T1	Bentaberri towards Hendaia
Location

Lugaritz is a railway station in San Sebastián, Basque Country, Spain. It is owned by Euskal Trenbide Sarea and operated by Euskotren. It lies on the Bilbao–San Sebastián line and is also served by the suburban Topo service.

== History ==
The station opened in 2005 as part of a new tunnel that substituted the old single-track tunnel between the neighborhood of Aiete and Amara. The new underground loop through the city center will start to the north of this station.

== Services ==
The station is served by Euskotren Trena lines E1 and E2. Line E2 runs every 15 minutes (in each direction) during weekdays, and every 30 minutes during weekends. Line E1 runs every 30 minutes (in each direction) during weekdays, and every hour during weekends.
