= Autovía A-8 =

Motorway in northern Spain

Autovía A-8
- Autovía del Cantábrico
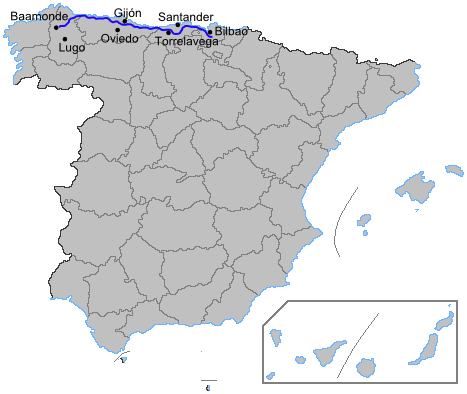

Route information
- Length: 486 km (302 mi)

Major junctions
- From: Bilbao
- To: Baamonde

Location
- Country: Spain

Highway system
- Highways in Spain; Autopistas and autovías; National Roads

The Autovía A-8, also called the Autovía del Cantábrico and Transcantábric, is a highway (Spanish: autovía) completed in 2015 which connects all the northern coastal regions of Spain. It connects Baamonde in Begonte, Galicia to Bilbao, where it continues as the Autopista AP-8 to the French border. The road passes Ribadeo, Avilés, Gijón, Santander and Bilbao.

== Construction ==
The road passes through hilly terrain with many viaducts and tunnels. It includes special vehicle-sensing signals on the foggy section between Mondoñedo and Abadín.

== Bilbao area ==
The A-8 is the main beltway of the Greater Bilbao conurbation, which has about a million inhabitants in the metropolitan area. The 30 kilometres (19 mi) of the highway that passes by Bilbao and its metropolitan area, from Galdakao to Muskiz, suffers from considerable traffic congestion.

=== Supersur by-pass ===
A new toll by-pass of the city, known as Supersur is being built. The by-pass will be 36 km (22 mi) long. Under the Pagasarri range most of it will be in tunnels, as there is no physical space to build it elsewhere.

== Gallery ==
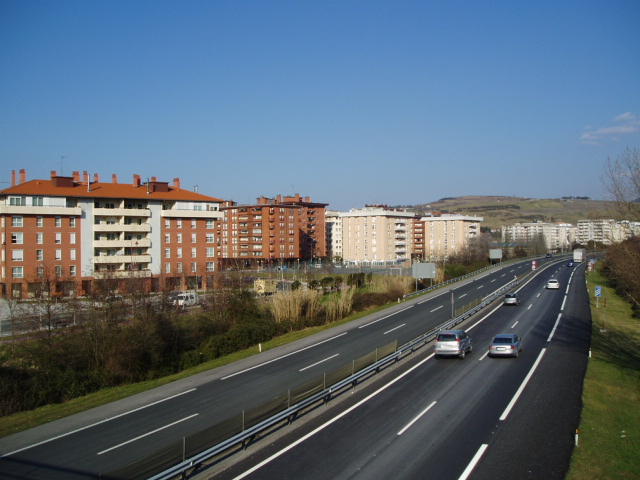
Autovía A-8 as seen from Zarautz

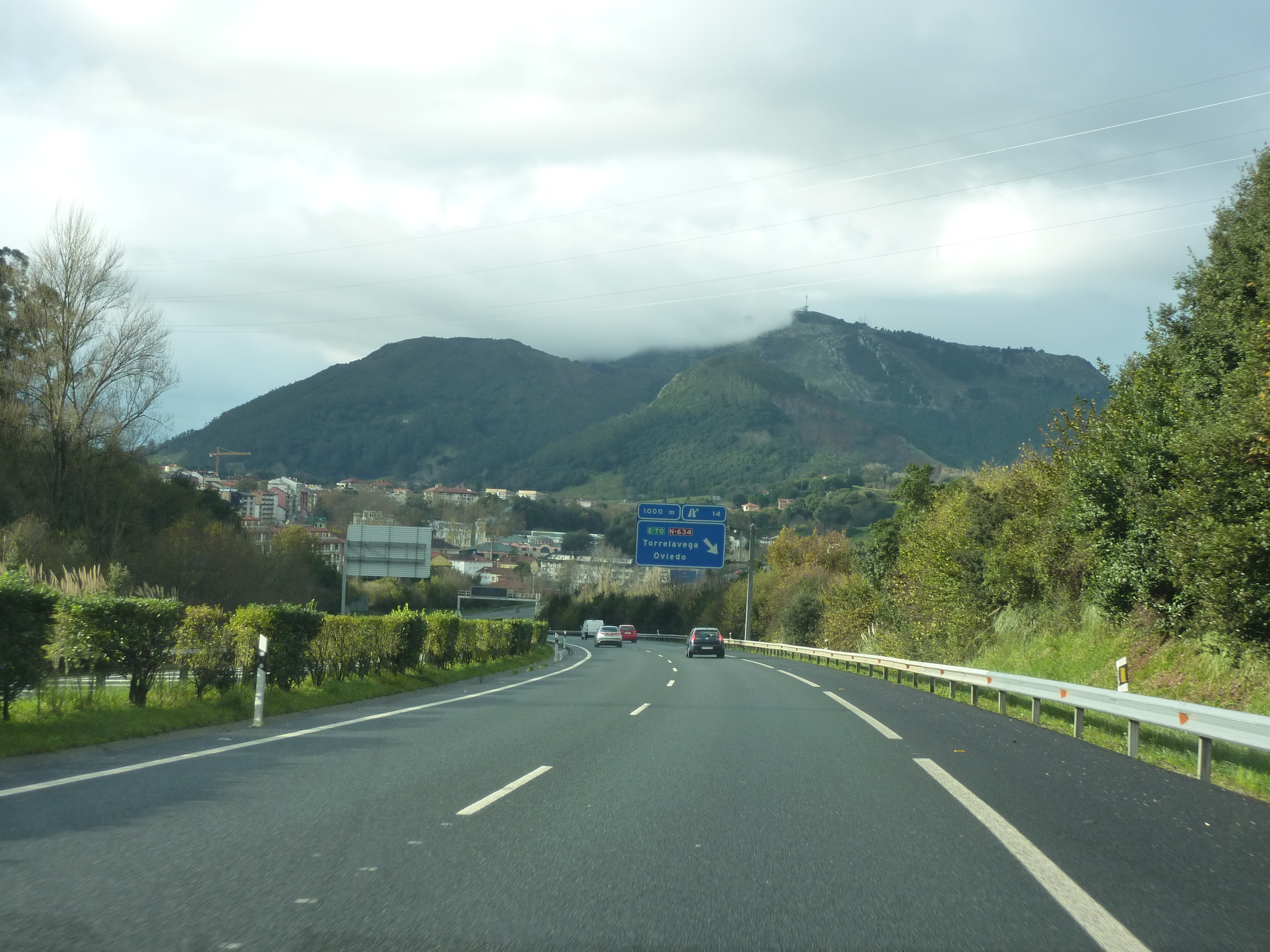
A-8 in Solares

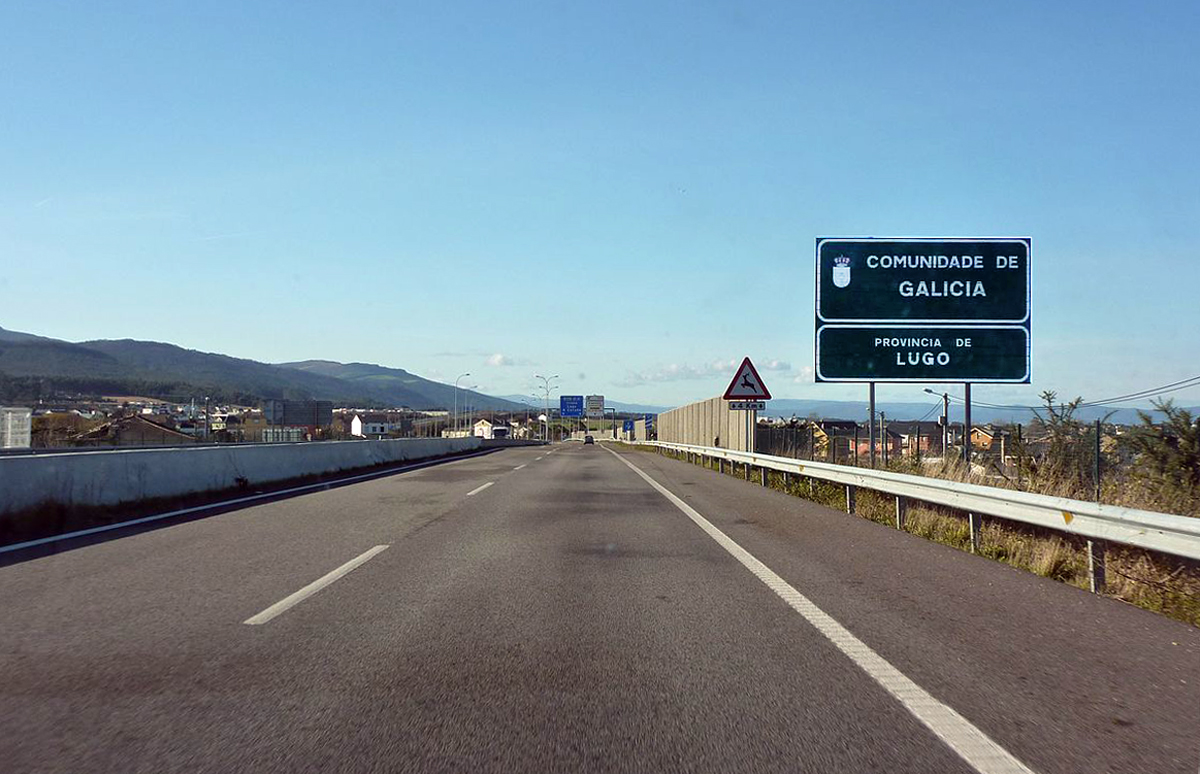
A-8 entering Galicia and crossing the Ría de Ribadeo
