= Church of San Salvador (Getaria) =

Historic site in Basque Country, Spain

- San Salbador Eliza (Basque); Iglesia de San Salvador (Spanish)
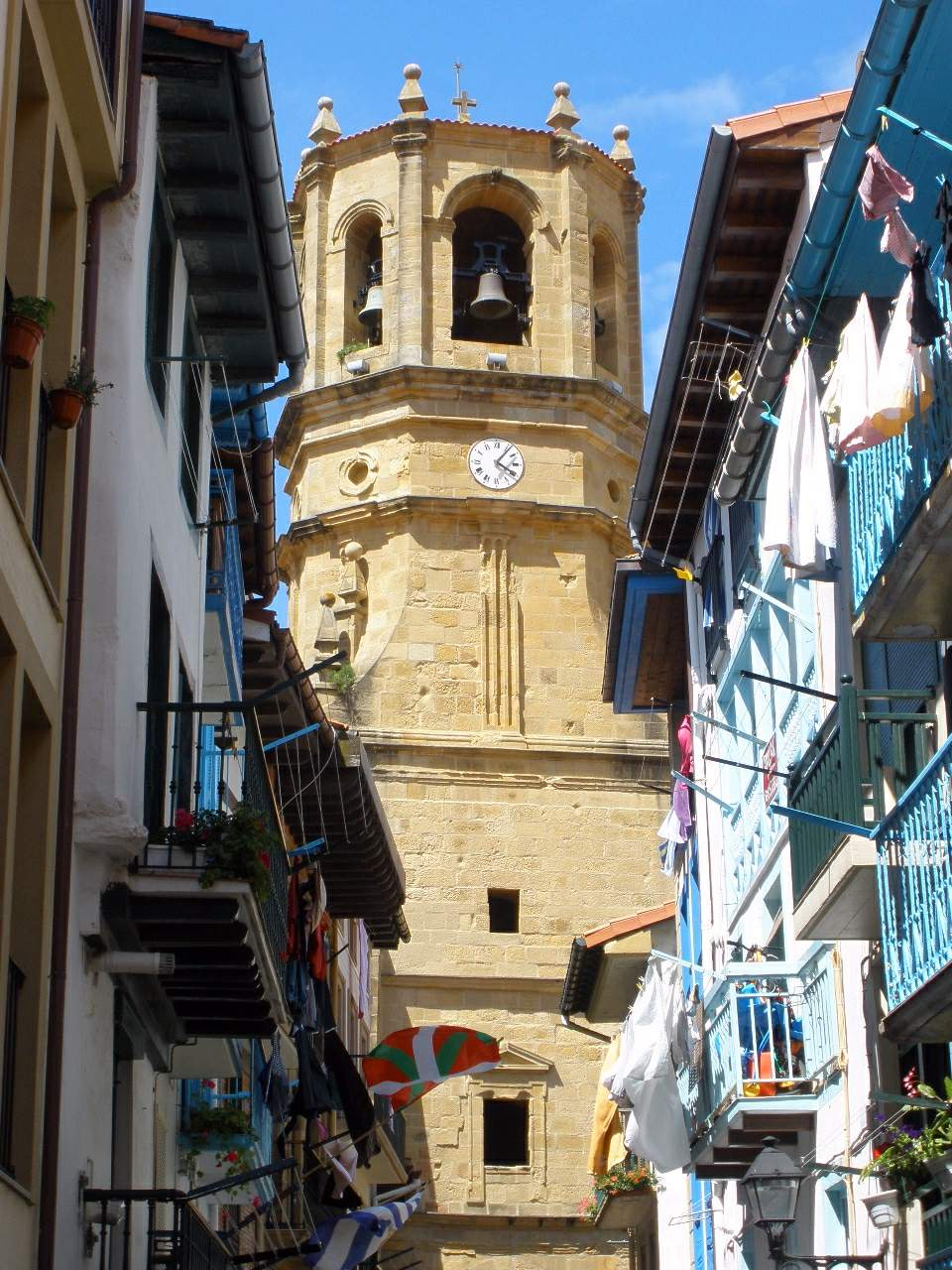

- Location within Spain
- 43.305038°N 2.203357°W
- Location: Getaria, Gipuzkoa

Spanish Cultural Heritage
- Official name: Iglesia de San Salvador (Guetaria)
- Type: Non-movable
- Criteria: Monument
- Designated: 1895
- Reference no.: RI-51-0000067

The Church of San Salvador (Basque: San Salbador Eliza, Spanish: Iglesia de San Salvador) is a church located in Getaria, Gipuzkoa. It was declared Bien de Interés Cultural in 1895.

== See also ==
- List of Bienes de Interés Cultural in the Province of Gipuzkoa
