= Orio =

Orio may refer to:

== People ==
Notable people with this name include:

=== Surname ===
- Baltasar de Echave Orio (late 16th century – mid-17th century), Basque Spanish painter
- Shane Orio (born 1980), Belizean football player

=== Given name ===
- Orio Caldiron (1938–2025), Italian film critic
- Orio Mastropiero (died 1192), Venetian doge
- Orio Palmer (1956–2001), American firefighter

== Places ==
- Orio (Kitakyūshū), Japan
- Orio, Spain
- Orio al Serio, Italy
- Orio Canavese, Italy
- Orio Litta, Italy

== Other ==
- Orio Station, Japan
- Orio al Serio International Airport
