= Aia =

- Municipality
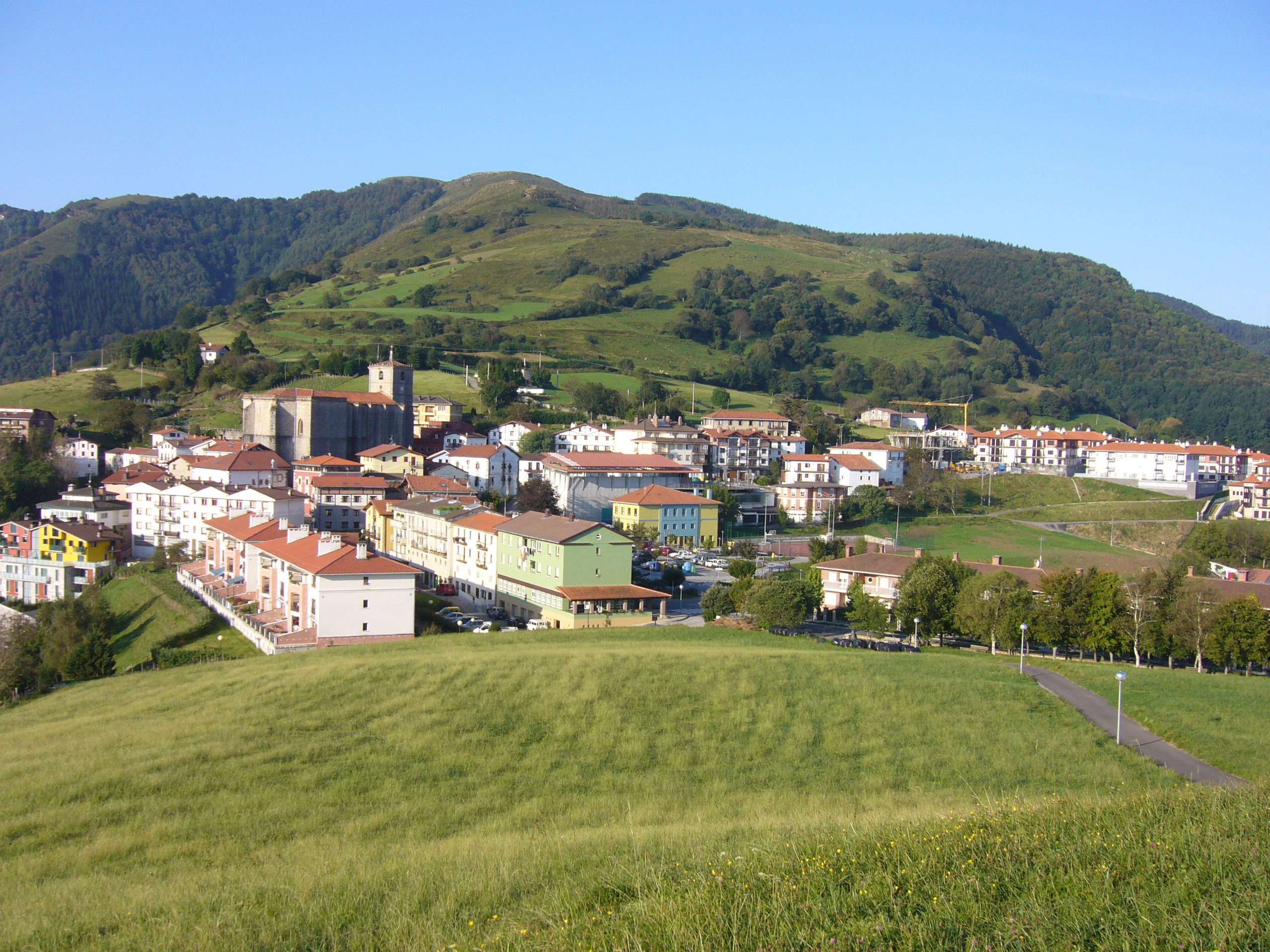
- Aia

- Coat of arms

- Location of Aia within the Basque Autonomous Community Aia (Spain)
- Coordinates: 43°14′12″N 2°08′55″W
- Country: Spain
- Autonomous community: Basque Country
- Province: Gipuzkoa
- Comarca: Urola Kosta

Population (2025-01-01)
  - Total: 2,148
- Time zone: UTC+1 (CET)
  - Summer (DST): UTC+2 (CEST)
- Postal code: 20809
- Dialing code: 34 (Spain) + 943 (Gipuzkoa)
- Website: Official website

Aia (/ˈaɪ.ə/; Basque: [ai.a]) is a village situated on the slopes of Mount Pagoeta in the Basque province of Gipuzkoa, Spain. It is located 30 km to the west of Donostia-San Sebastián and about 10 km inland from the coastal town of Zarautz. Aia is set amongst hills and forests, and surrounded by mountains. The town has a large church, the Church of San Esteban, which includes a notable centrepiece. The population of Aia has gradually declined since the 1950s, to a population of 1,750 in 2005.

== History ==
Based on cave paintings and engravings and also stone implements that have been found in the Aia district, it is believed that human habitation of the area dates back to over 10,000 years ago. The town of Aia itself was mentioned in one of the oldest documents of Gipuzkoa dated 1025. The town was also mentioned as being part of the Union of Sayaz in the Decree of the Brotherhood of the Province of Gupuzkoa in 1375.

Farming was originally the main economic activity in the Aia district, with families of the small villages living within closed, self-sufficient economic systems. Land was generally owned by the municipality and rented to the farmers to work. Specialised crafts also began to develop, and in particular Aia became a main centre for the production of iron. This was largely due to the abundance of natural deposits of iron in the area. Numerous foundries were established in the area, which had a significant impact on the growth of the local population. It was from these foundries that many family lineages in the Aia district developed. The demise of these old forges in Guipúzcoa was brought about by the introduction of blast furnaces that ran on coal.

== Tourism ==
Aia is situated within Basque farmlands, and largely unchanged over several hundred years. It has several tourist attractions, including the 1,335-acre (5.40 km^{2}) Pagoeta Nature Reserve which sits to the west of the town of Aia and preserves the natural environment of the area, as well as the district's cultural heritage. The park contains a number of ruins of old mills, foundries, and farmhouses, and some ancient burial mounds dating back 5,000 years.

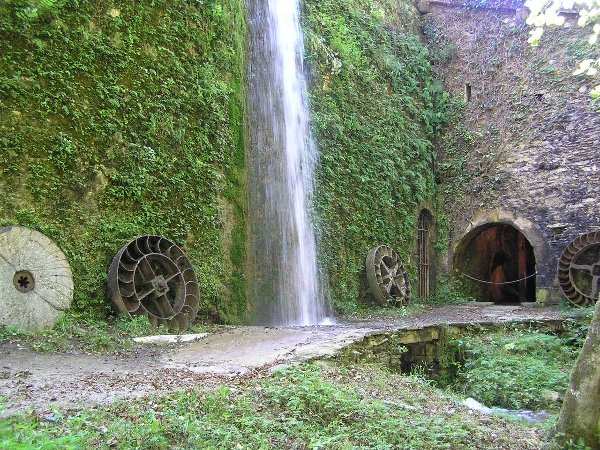
Agorregi Forge, near Aia, Gipuzkoa Province

The Agorregi Forge, located within the park, is one of the best preserved examples of a foundry in Gipuzkoa province. The forge which can be seen today was built in 1754 by the Lord of Laurgain Palace over the ruins of an earlier version. Lying at the bottom of a deep valley near Manterola farmhouse, it used the river's hydraulic energy to power its bellows and turn its waterwheels.

Also situated near Aia and within the Pagoeta Nature Reserve is the Iturraran Botanic Garden. The garden was established in 1986 and includes more than 1,000 species of plants, trees, and shrubs from all over the world. It also includes some endangered flora of the Basque Country.

== Geographic distribution ==
Aia is a municipality formed by a principal nucleus – the town of Aia – and its neighbourhoods, which resemble small villages. It comprises eleven neighbourhoods:

- Alzola (Altzola): A parish with 11 inhabitants.
- Andatza o San Pedro: 249 inhabitants.
- Arratola Aldea: 38 inhabitants.
- Arrutiegia: 106 inhabitants.
- Elcano (Elkano): 100 inhabitants. This neighbourhood is shared with Zarauz.
- Etxetaballa: 45 inhabitants.
- Iruretaegia: 97 inhabitants.
- Kurpidea: 59 inhabitants.
- Laurgain: 78 inhabitants.
- Olaskoegia: 202 inhabitants.
- Santio Erreka: 254 inhabitants.
- Urdaneta: 78 inhabitants

The urban nucleus of Aia has about 470 inhabitants.
