= Puerto Santander =

Puerto Santander may refer to:

- Puerto Santander, Amazonas, a town and municipality in the Amazonas Department, Colombia
- Puerto Santander, Norte de Santander, a town and municipality in the Norte de Santander Department, Colombia
