= Itziar =

Coordinates: 43.276°N 2.33°W

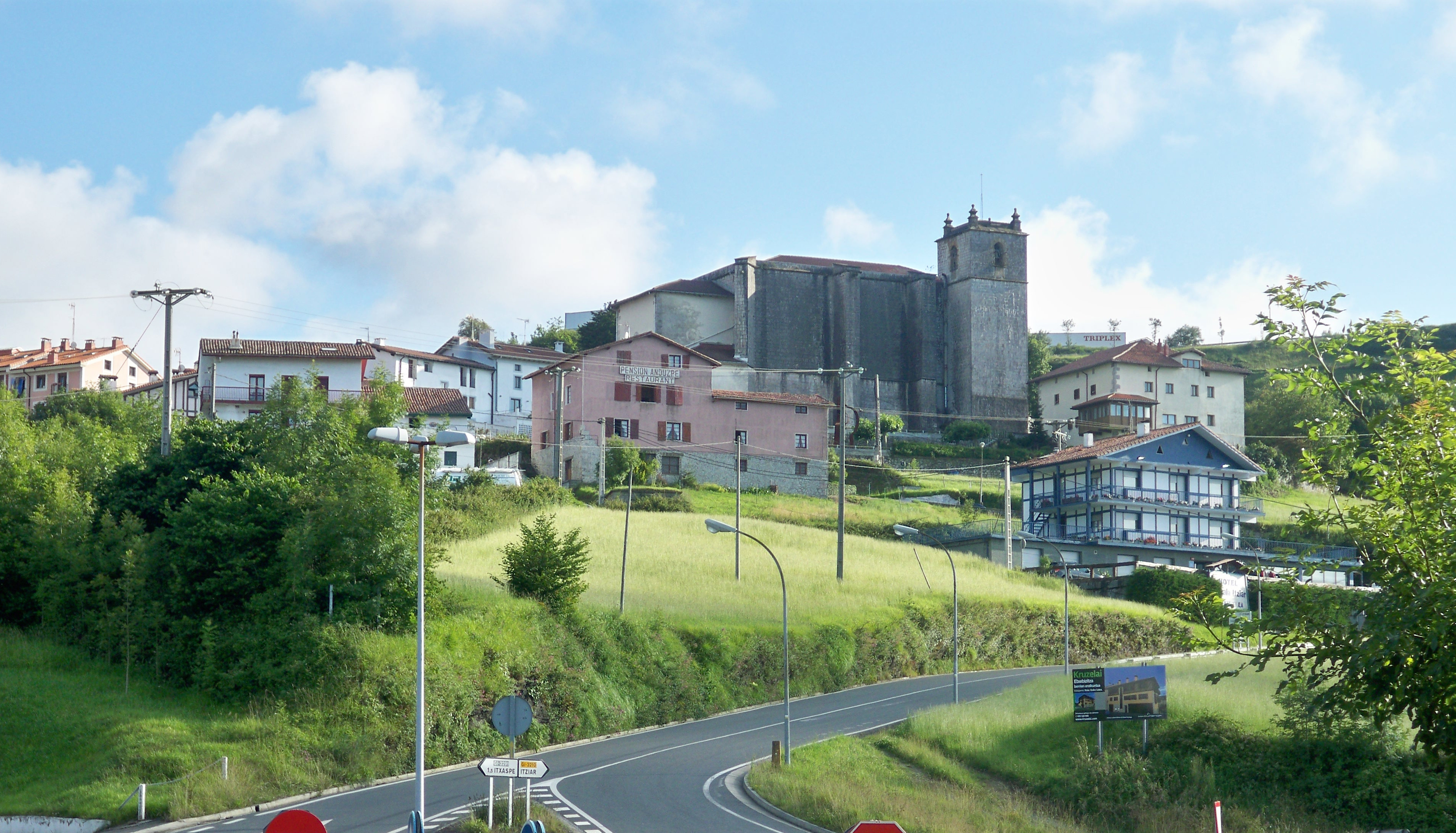
The centre of Itziar

Itziar is a neighborhood in Deba, Gipuzkoa, Spain, next to Mount Andutz. It is located 6 km from the town of Deba.
