= Getaria =

Getaria may refer to:

- Getaria, France, in Labourd
- Getaria, Gipuzkoa, Spain
