= Pagoeta Natural Park =

Spanish natural park

Coordinates: 43°14′10″N 2°10′30″W

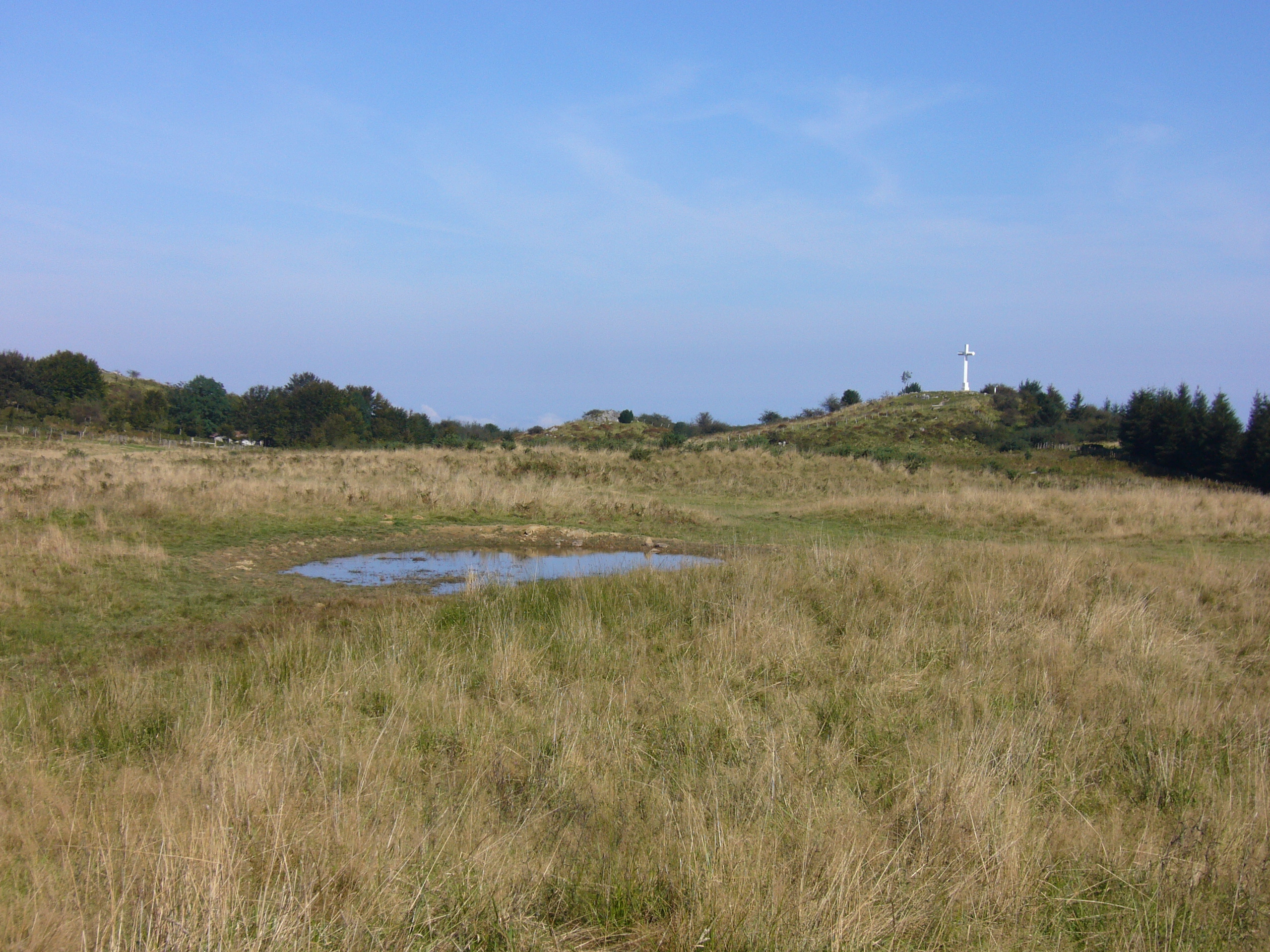
Summit of mount Pagoeta

Pagoeta Natural Park is a park in Gipuzkoa, Basque Autonomous Community, Spain. Mount Pagoeta is closest to the villages of Aia and Laurgain, and near the coastal towns of Zarautz and Orio. The park features a park house, a museum, and picnic areas. Group guided tours are available.

== Features ==
The natural park, covering an area of 2,860 hectares, was created by the agricultural activities of the village and differs from many parks for that reason. Instead of demonstrating only natural landscape, it shows the impact of human intervention in the environment. For example, installations remain throughout the park for making charcoal from wood and the water-powered Agorregi Forge has been reconstructed. In addition to demonstrating historical practices, the park continues to display human intervention in the environment, with reforestation and the formation of an exotic species botanical garden. There are also archaeological remnants of the prehistoric occupants of the area, with dolmens, barrows and cave deposits.

== Climate ==
The park has mild, moist temperatures year round, with an annual temperature average of 12–13 °C (54–55 °F) and rainfall exceeding 1,600 mm (63 in).

== Flora and fauna ==
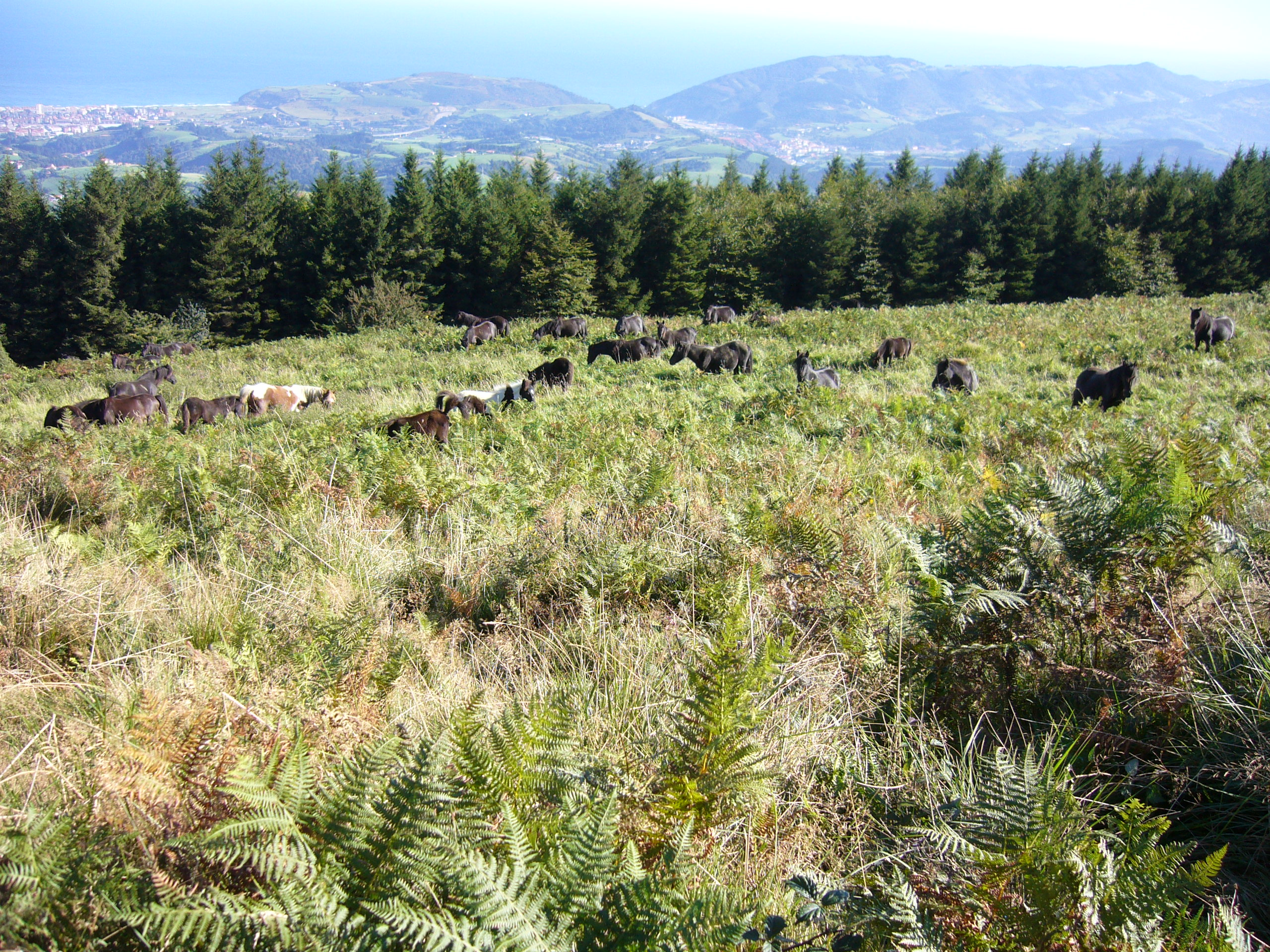
Horses in Pagoeta Natural Park

The park has large woods, colorful in autumn, featuring groves of beech, oak and alder. It is home to a number of species of birds, including the citril finch and the water pipit. Among the species found there are wild boar, European wildcat, and marten. Roe deer have been reintroduced.
