= Zestoa =

- Municipality
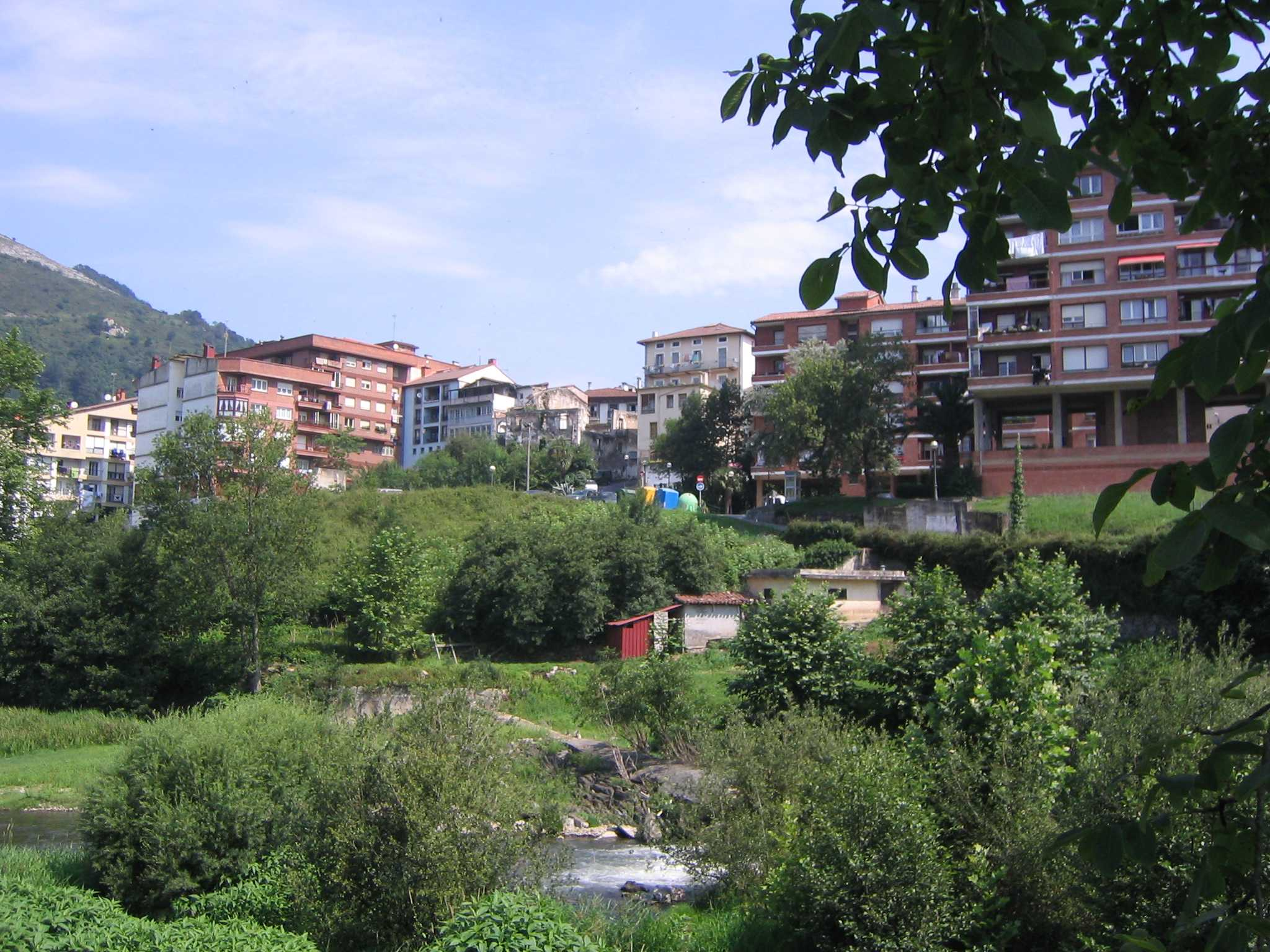

- Coat of arms

- Location of Zestoa within the Basque Country
- Coordinates: 43°14′24″N 2°15′31″W
- Country: Spain
- Autonomous Community: Basque Country
- Province: Gipuzkoa
- Comarca: Urola Kosta

Area
  - Total: 43.69 km^{2} (16.87 sq mi)

Population (2025-01-01)
  - Total: 3,933
  - Density: 90.02/km^{2} (233.2/sq mi)
- Time zone: UTC+1 (CET)
  - Summer (DST): UTC+2 (CEST (GMT +2))
- Postal code: 20740
- Area code: +34 (Spain) + 94 (Biscay)

Zestoa (Spanish: Cestona) is a town located in the province of Gipuzkoa, in the autonomous community of the Basque Country, northern Spain.
