= Deba, Spain =

Deba
- Municipality
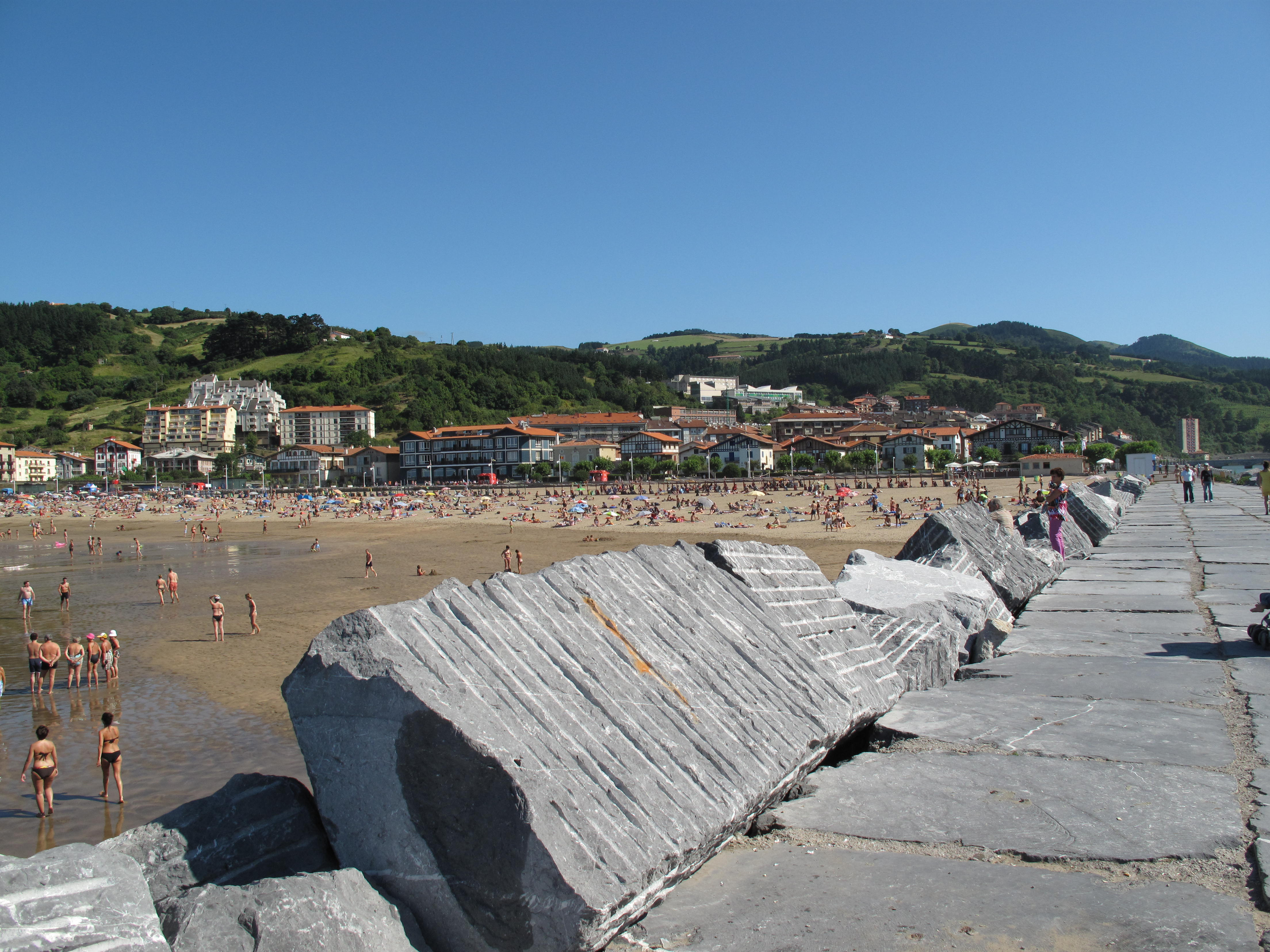
- Deba beach

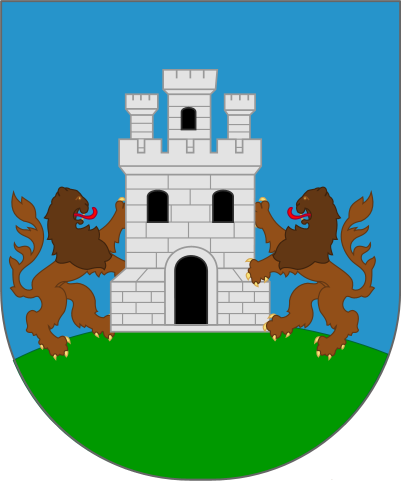
- Coat of arms

- Location in Spain Deba (Spain)
- Coordinates: 43°17′43″N 2°21′0″W
- Country: Spain
- Autonomous Community: Basque Country
- Province: Gipuzkoa
- Comarca: Debabarrena

Government
  - Alcalde: Alazne Txurruka (Basque Nationalist Party)

Area
  - Total: 50.3 km^{2} (19.4 sq mi)
- Elevation (AMSL): 10 m (33 ft)

Population (2025-01-01)
  - Total: 5,362
  - Density: 107/km^{2} (276/sq mi)
- Time zone: UTC+1 (CET)
  - Summer (DST): UTC+2 (CEST (GMT +2))
- Postal code: 20820
- Area code: +34 (Spain) + 943 (Gipuzkoa)
- Website: www.deba.net

Deba is a town located in the province of Gipuzkoa, in the autonomous community of Basque Country, in the north of Spain. The town centre is right on the sea, and the municipal district includes a series of country villages, such as Itziar, Lastur and Elorriaga.

== History ==
The town shares a name with the Deba River, cited in Roman chronicles. Shell deposits and bone harpoons may be found in many caves in the Deba municipal districts, and some of the figures in the Palaeolithic shrine at Ekain further show the town's relationship to the sea.

The town's origins date back to 1343. Sancho IV of Castile granted the citizens of "Monte-Real", in Itziar, a charter as a township in 1294. Subsequently, they moved closer to the coast and founded a new settlement that they called Monreal de Deba. In the 15th century, Deba enjoyed a period of splendour due to shipping, particularly with the export of wool from Castile and Aragón to various European countries. In the 19th century the port declined and tourism rose.

Deba has an annual festival called "San Roke festivities".
