= Elgoibar =

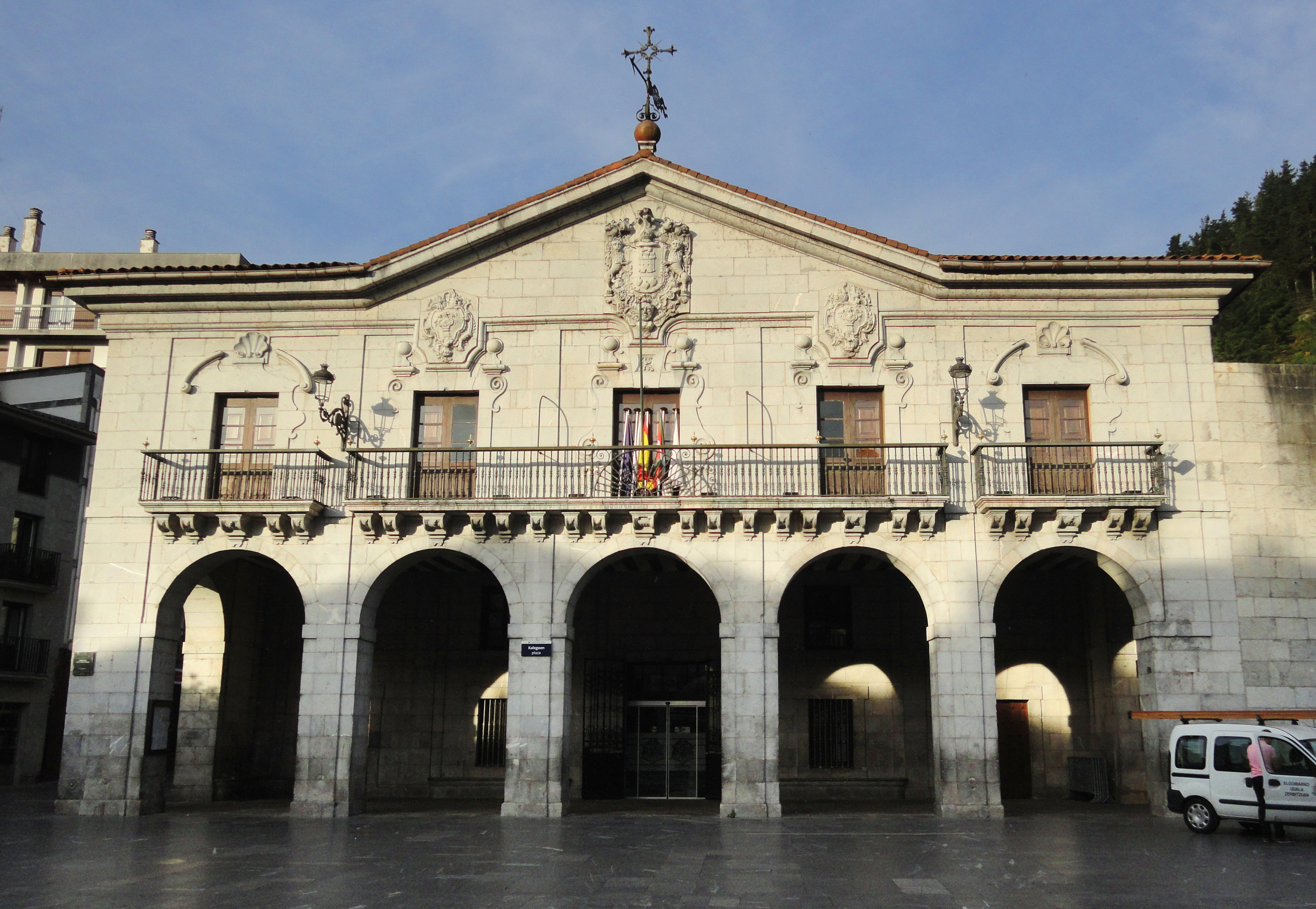
- Town hall of Elgoibar

- Flag Coat of arms

- Location of Elgoibar within the Basque Country Elgoibar (Spain)
- Coordinates: 43°12′51″N 02°25′01″W
- Country: Spain
- Autonomous community: Basque Country
- Province: Gipuzkoa
- Comarca: Debabarrena
- Established: December 20, 1346

Government
  - Mayor: Maialen Gurrutxaga (PNV)

Area
  - Land: 39.11 km^{2} (15.10 sq mi)

Population (2025-01-01)
  - Total: 11,705
  - Density: 292.46/km^{2} (757.5/sq mi)
- Time zone: UTC+1 (CET)
  - Summer (DST): UTC+2 (CEST)
- Postal code: 20870
- Area code: 34 (Spain) + 943 (Gipuzkoa)

Elgoibar (Spanish: Elgóibar) is an industrial town located in the province of Gipuzkoa, in the Autonomous Community of the Basque Country, northern Spain. Located in a valley, it is traversed by the Deba river. Elgoibar is nicknamed the "capital city of the Machine tool".

Originally the town was called Villamayor de Marquina, but it had been founded in a place called before Elgoibar field. The town came to be known by this name a few centuries of its foundation. Until the mid-15th century it appears in the documentation as Villamayor de Marquina, but in the statutes of the Brotherhood of Gipuzkoa of 1457 and 1463 years appears with the Elgoibar name and it has prevailed until today. Elgoibar name has been used in Spanish and in Basque in order to refer to the small town. The only difference is that in Spanish the name Elgoibar has an accent mark above its "o".

Elgoibar etymologically comes from the Basque language and is possibly composed of the word elge (meaning "field", usually cultivated), and iba - a word which means "valley" or "plain". Therefore, "elge ibar" would be a similar term to "vega" or "a cultivated field". This etymology would fit quite well with the mention of Elgoibar field that appears in the settlement charter of the town.

== Economy ==
Since the very beginning of the establishment of the town, its industrial nature was very relevant. The king kept for himself the strip mining of the minerals such as gold or silver, and the ironworks production. As Tomás López described in 1800 "The industrialization transformed that protoindustry, on a machinery tools factories network; like this is how this village turned into being the "capital city of the Machine Tool".

Main companies

The following list includes companies that are located in Elgoibar, and that have at least a staff of 50 people according to the Basque Industry catalog:

- Alcorta Brockhaus, S.A.: Manufacturer of components of forged steel for the automotive industry.
- AVS Added Value Solutions: Designing and manufacturing equipment for the industry of science and machine tool industry.
- Bernardo Ecenarro, S.A.: Manufacturing paints and special covers for the automotive industry
- Doimak: Manufacturing rectifier machines
- Engranajes Grindel, S.A.: Manufacturer of gears.
- Etxe-Tar, S.A.: Machine Tool Industry

== Local Festivities ==
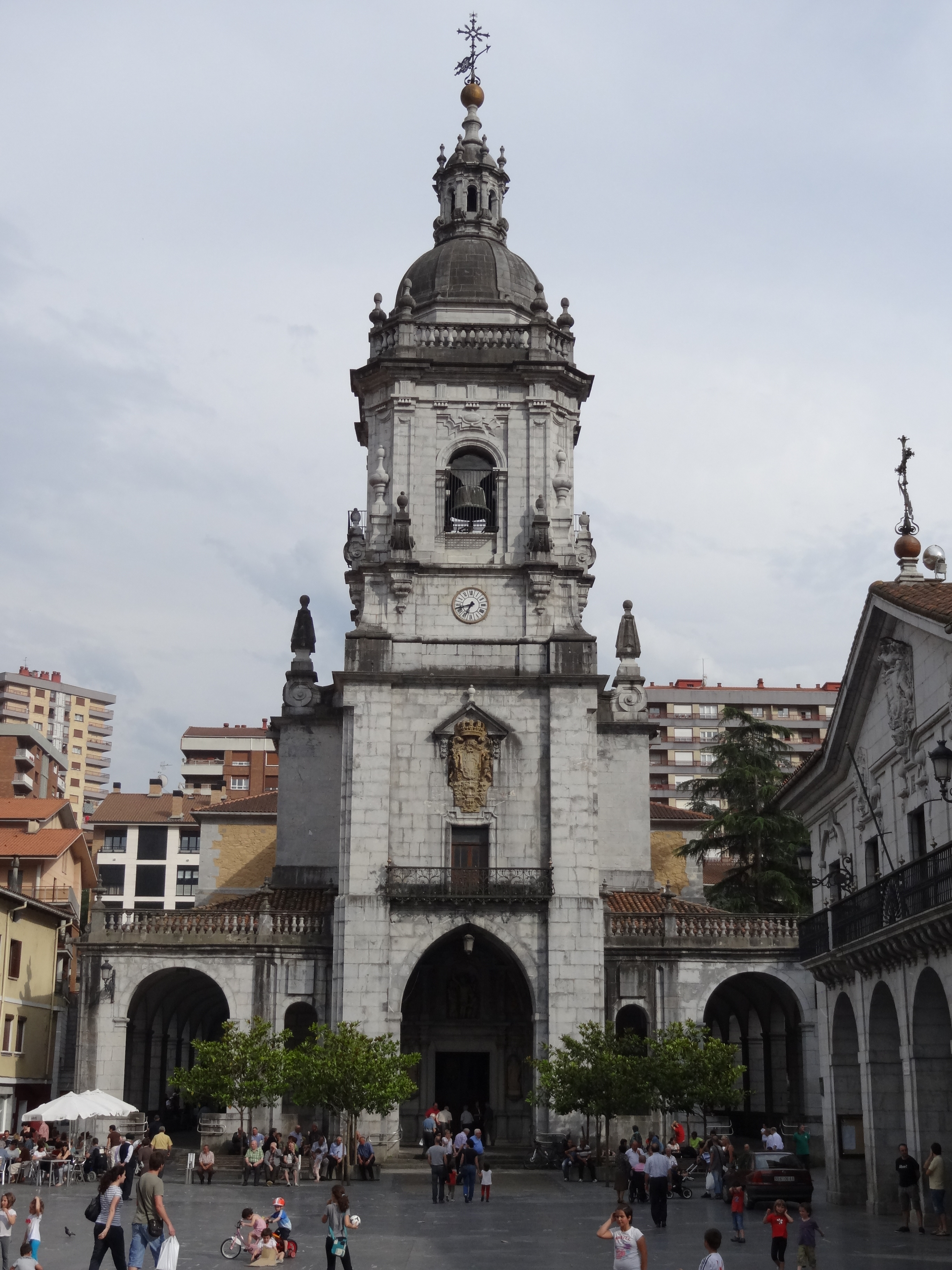
Church of San Bartolomé, Elgoibar

Elgoibar celebrates festivity in honor of its patron; San Bartolome and San Anton. The latter is the patron of the villa. In addition, there are a number of celebrations that are celebrated in unison of the region or the country such as San Blas, Carnivals or the Eve of St. Agatha. There is cattle fair the last Saturday of each month and specially the last Saturday of the year, Gabon Zahar Feria.

- San Anton festivity, second landlord of the town, on 17 January.
- San Bartolome, the patron of Elgoibar, on 23 August.
- San Juan festivity, on 23 June.

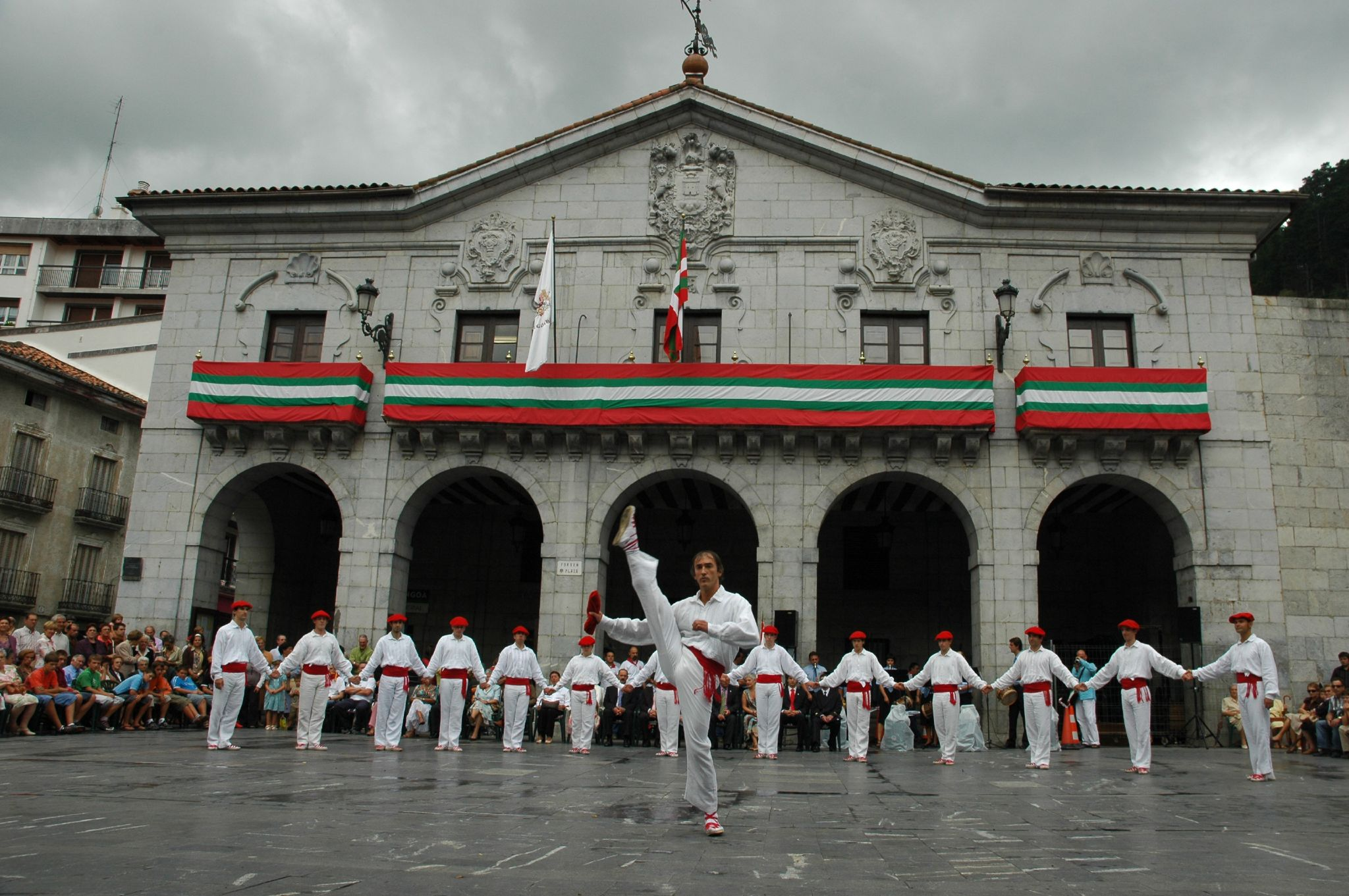
Local Traditional folk dance members in front of Elgoibar City Hall

Then, there are smaller celebrations in the rural districts and the hermitages like the pilgrimage of Santiago Sargoate day.

== Sport ==
The 1st stage of The 2024 Tour of the Basque Country finished at Elgoibar on May 10 Also They have a Soccer team, CD Elgoibar.

== Notable people from Elgoibar ==
Militaries and Governors

- Martín Íñiguez de Carquizano (?-1527): sailor that took part in the García Jofre de Loaisa expedition.
- Gabriel de Crucelegui (1635-1689): governor of the Philippines.

Religious people

- Domingo de Alzola 16th century: Guadalajara's archbishop.
- Francisco Aguirre (1863-1941): missionary priest in China.

Industrial people

- Eulogio Estarta (1891-1955): industrial. Founder of the local company "SIGMA".
- Bernando Ecenarro (1873-1956): industrialist.

Writers

- Pedro Miguel Urruzuno (1844-1923): priest and Basque writer.
- Jasone Osoro (1971): journalist and Basque writer.
- Gotzon Garate (1934-2008): Basque writer, philosopher, philologist and Jesuit.
- Hasier Etxeberria (1957): journalist and writer. Broadcaster of the literary TV program Sautrela in ETB
- Uxue Alberdi (1984): journalist, writer and improviser of Basque verse.

Pelota Players

- Roque Echave, Echave II (1938)
- Ignacio Cortabitarte (1912-1998)
- Javier Arriola Lizarralde, Arriola IV

Football players

- José Luis González (1964): footballer who played as a goalkeeper for Real Sociedad and Valencia C.F, among others.
- Tiburcio Beristain (1904-1959): footballer.
- Fernando Ansola (1940-1986): international football player who played for Real Oviedo, Real Betis, Valencia C.F and Real Sociedad.
- Juan Cruz Sol (1947): international footballer who played for Real Madrid and Valencia CF.
- Markel Bergara (1986): football player who played for Real Sociedad.
- Ricardo Suarez (1923-2008): football player who played for Real Sociedad and Granada C.F, among others.
- Joseba Etxeberria (1977): international football player who played for Real Sociedad and Athletic Club.
- Itziar Gurrutxaga (1977): international football player who played for Athletic Club EFT.
- Zuhaitz Gurrutxaga (1980): football player who played for Real Sociedad.
- Elisabeth Ibarra (1981): international football player who played for Athletic Club EFT.

Other sports

- Juan Muguerza (1900-1937): athlete.
- Jose Maria Benavides (1945): yachtsman. 11 times Spanish champion and twice Olympic winner.

Bullfighter

- Luis Mazzantini (1856-1926)

Politicians

- Jaime Arrese (1936-1980): Mayor of Elgoibar in the 1970s. Assassinated by the Comandos Autonomos anticapitalistas
- Francisco Javier Ansuategui (1937): conservative politician.
- Arnaldo Otegi (1958): Basque national politician, General Secretary of Basque nationalist party EH Bildu.

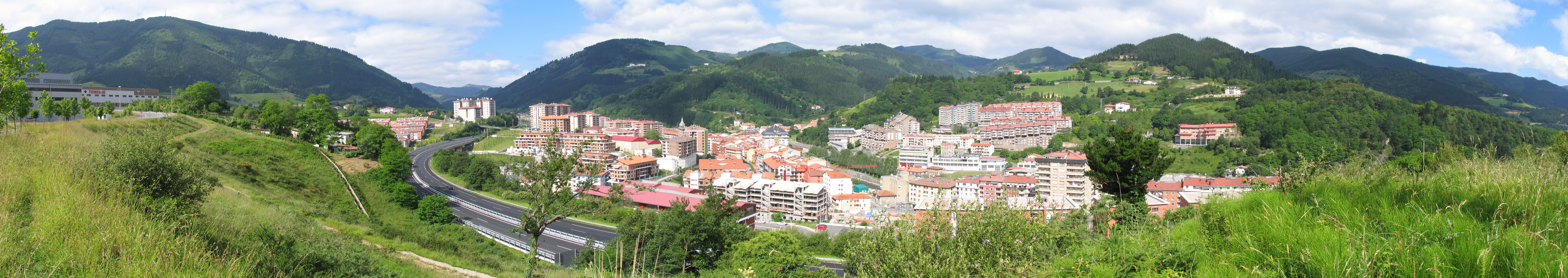
Panoramic view of Elgoibar
