= Bilbao =

- Municipality
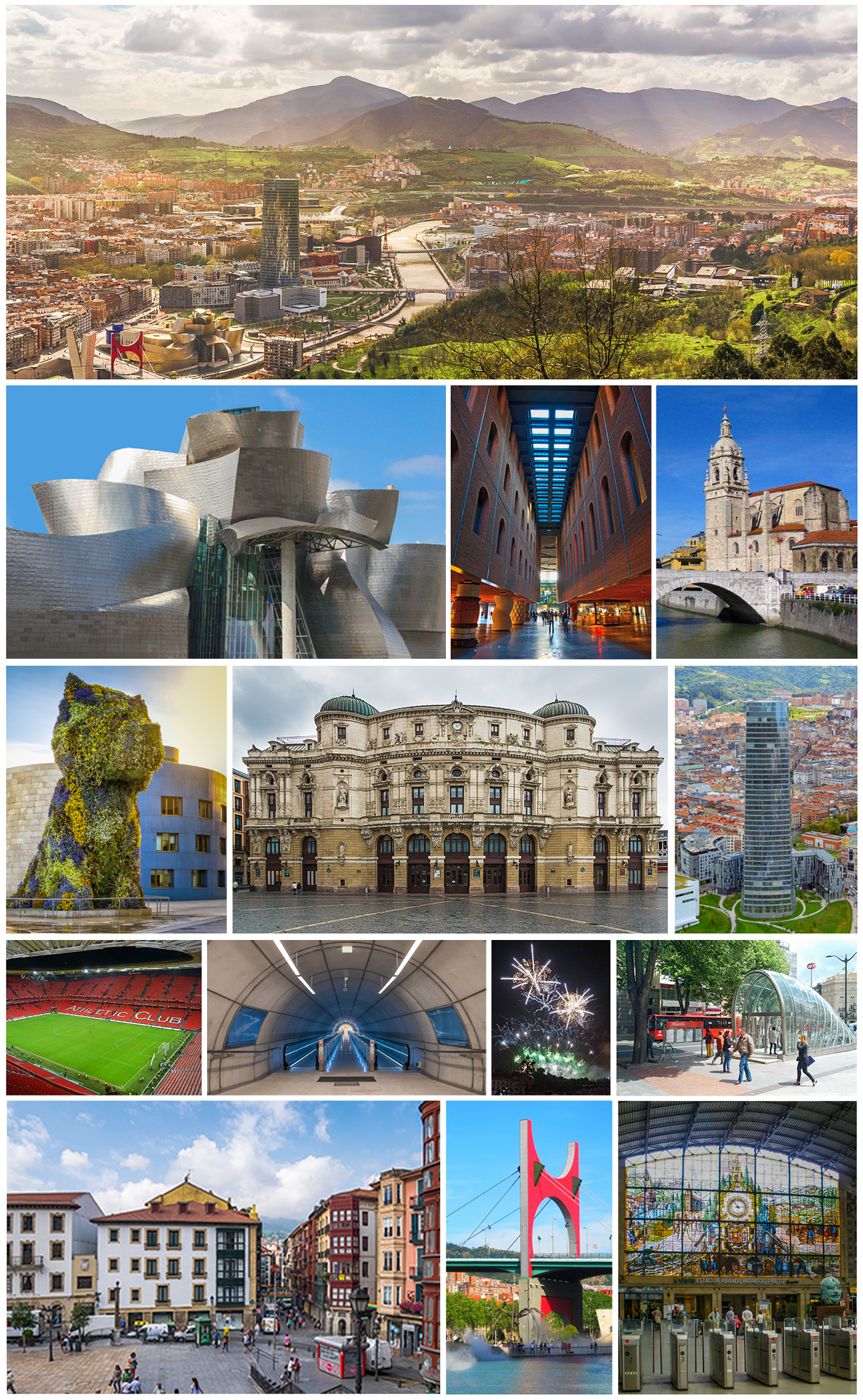
- From top left: view of the city; Guggenheim Museum; Azkuna Zentroa; Church of San Antón; Puppy; Arriaga Theatre; Iberdrola Tower; San Mamés Stadium; Uribarri station of the Bilbao Metro; fireworks in the Aste Nagusia; fosterito; Miguel de Unamuno Square in the Casco Viejo; La Salve; and Bilbao-Abando railway station

- Flag Coat of arms
- Nickname: "The Hole" (Spanish: El Botxo)
- Interactive map of Bilbao
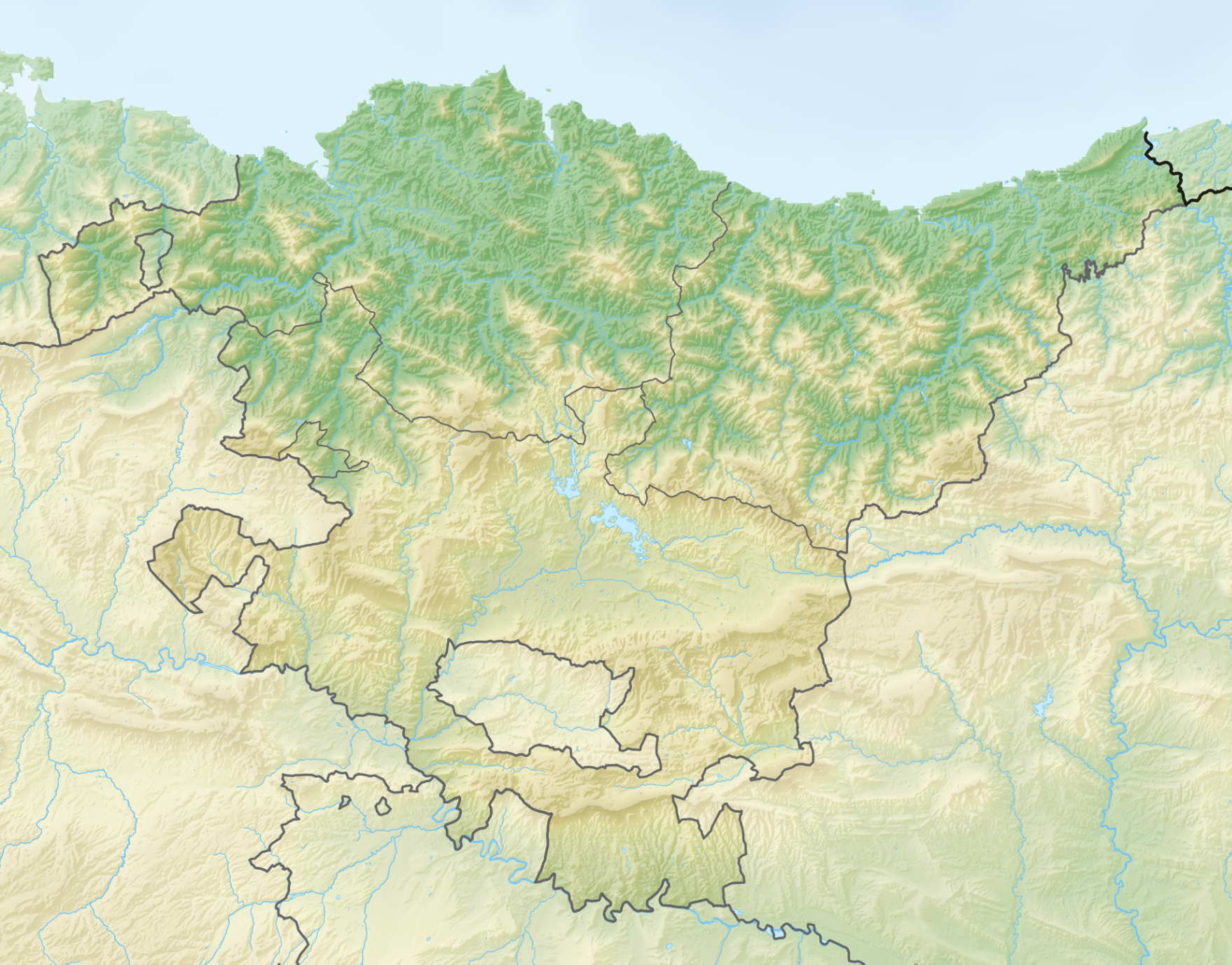
- Location within the Basque Country Location within Spain Location within Europe
- Coordinates: 43°15′25″N 2°55′25″W
- Country: Spain
- Autonomous community: Basque Country
- Province: Biscay
- Comarca: Greater Bilbao
- Founded: 15 June 1300; 726 years ago
- Founder: Diego López V de Haro

Government
  - Type: Ayuntamiento
  - Body: Bilbao City Council
  - Mayor: Juan Mari Aburto (PNV)

Area
  - Municipality: 41.50 km^{2} (16.02 sq mi)
  - Urban: 18.22 km^{2} (7.03 sq mi)
  - Rural: 23.30 km^{2} (9.00 sq mi)
- Elevation: 19 m (62 ft)
- Highest elevation: 689 m (2,260 ft)
- Lowest elevation: 0 m (0 ft)

Population (2024)
  - Municipality: 347,342
  - Density: 8,370/km^{2} (21,680/sq mi)
  - Urban: 782,000
  - Metro: 1,037,847
- Demonyms: Bilbaine Spanish: bilbaíno, bilbaína Basque: bilbotarra

GDP
  - Metro: €32.891 billion (2020)
  - Per capita: €28,801 (2020)
- Time zone: UTC+1 (CET)
  - Summer (DST): UTC+2 (CEST)
- Postal code: 48001–48015
- Dialing code: +34 94
- Official language(s): Basque; Spanish
- Website: Official website

Bilbao (Note: Pronunciation: /bɪlˈbaʊ, -ˈbɑːoʊ/ bil-BOW, -BAH-oh, US also /-ˈbeɪoʊ/ -BAY-oh; Spanish: [bilˈβao]; Basque: Bilbo [bilβo].) is a city in northern Spain, the largest city in the province of Biscay and in the autonomous community of the Basque Country. With a population of 347,342 as of 2024, it is the 11th most populous city in Spain, and the most populous in northern Spain. The Bilbao metropolitan area has 1,037,847 inhabitants, making it the most populous metropolitan area in northern Spain. The comarca of Greater Bilbao is the fifth-largest urban area in Spain. Bilbao is also the main urban area in what is defined as the Greater Basque region.

Bilbao is located in the north-central part of Spain, some 16 kilometres (10 mi) south of the Bay of Biscay, where the economic social development is located, where the estuary of Bilbao is formed. Its main urban core is surrounded by two small mountain ranges with an average elevation of 400 metres (1,300 ft). Its climate is shaped by the Bay of Biscay low-pressure systems and mild air, moderating summer temperatures by Iberian standards, with low sunshine and high rainfall. The annual temperature range is low for its latitude.

After its foundation in the late 13th century by Diego López V de Haro, head of the powerful Haro family, Bilbao was one of the commercial hubs of the Basque Country that enjoyed significant importance in the Crown of Castile. This was due to its thriving port activity based on the export of wool and iron commodities extracted from the Biscayan quarries to all over Europe.

Throughout the nineteenth century and the beginning of the twentieth, Bilbao experienced heavy industrialisation, making it the centre of the second-most industrialised region of Spain, behind Barcelona. At the same time an extraordinary population explosion prompted the annexation of several adjacent municipalities. Nowadays, Bilbao is a vigorous service city that is experiencing an ongoing social, economic, and aesthetic revitalisation process, started by the iconic Guggenheim Museum Bilbao, and continued by infrastructure investments, such as the airport terminal, the rapid transit system, the tram line, the Azkuna Zentroa, and the currently under development Abandoibarra and Zorrozaurre renewal projects.

Bilbao is also home to football team Athletic Club, a significant symbol for Basque nationalism due to its promotion of only Basque players and being one of the most successful clubs in Spanish football history.

On 19 May 2010, the city of Bilbao was recognised with the Lee Kuan Yew World City Prize, awarded by the city state of Singapore. Considered the Nobel Prize for urbanism, it was handed out on 29 June 2010. On 7 January 2013, its mayor, Iñaki Azkuna, received the 2012 World Mayor Prize awarded every two years by the British foundation The City Mayors Foundation, in recognition of the urban transformation experienced by the Biscayan capital since the 1990s. On 8 November 2017, Bilbao was chosen the Best European City 2018 at The Urbanism Awards 2018, awarded by the international organisation The Academy of Urbanism.

== Toponymy and symbols ==
The official name of the town is Bilbao, as known in most languages of the world. Euskaltzaindia, the official regulatory institution of the Basque language, has agreed that between the two possible names existing in Basque, Bilbao and Bilbo, the historical name is Bilbo, while Bilbao is the official name. Although the term Bilbo does not appear in old documents, in the play The Merry Wives of Windsor by William Shakespeare, there is a reference to swords presumably made of Biscayan iron which he calls "bilboes", suggesting that it is a word used since at least the sixteenth century.

There is no consensus among historians about the origin of the name. Generally accepted accounts state that prior to the 12th century, the independent rulers of the territory, named Lords of Zubialdea, were also known as Lords of Bilbao la Vieja ("Old Bilbao"). The symbols of their patrimony are the tower and church used in the shield of Bilbao to this day. One possible origin was suggested by the engineer Evaristo de Churruca. He said that it was a Basque custom to name a place after its location. For Bilbao this would be the result of the union of the Basque words for river and cove: Bil-Ibaia-Bao. The historian José Tussel Gómez argues that it is just a natural evolution of the Spanish words bello vado, beautiful ford. On the other hand, according to the writer Esteban Calle Iturrino, the name derives from the two settlements that existed on both banks of the estuary, rather than from the estuary itself. The first, where the present Casco Viejo is located, would be called billa, which means stacking in Basque, after the configuration of the buildings. The second, on the left bank, where now Bilbao La Vieja is located, would be called vaho, Spanish for mist or steam. From the union of these two derives the name Bilbao, which was also written as Bilvao and Biluao, as documented in its municipal charter. An -ao ending is also present in nearby Sestao and Ugao, that could be explained from Basque aho, "mouth".

=== Demonym ===
The demonym is bilbaíno, -a", although the popular pronunciation bilbaino/a (sic) is also frequent. In Basque, it is bilbotar, which is sometimes also used in Spanish, generally within the Basque Country. The village is affectionately known by its inhabitants as the botxo meaning "hole", since it is surrounded by mountains. The nickname botxero is derived from this nickname. Another nickname that Bilbao receives is that of chimbos, which comes from birds that were hunted in large numbers in these places during the 19th century.

The titles, the flag and the coat of arms are Bilbao's traditional symbols and belong to its historic patrimony, being used in formal acts, for the identification and decoration of specific places or for the validation of documents.

=== Titles ===
Bilbao holds the historic category of township (villa), with the titles of "Very noble and very loyal and unbeaten" (Muy Noble y Muy Leal e Invicta). It was the Catholic Monarchs who awarded the title "Noble Town" (Noble Villa) on 20 September 1475. Philip III of Spain, via a letter in 1603 awarded the town the titles of "Very noble and very loyal". After the siege of Bilbao, during the First Carlist War, on 25 December 1836, the title of "Unbeaten" was added.

=== Coat of arms ===
The coat of arms of Bilbao

The coat of arms is emblazoned as follows:

In an argent field a bridge with two eyes, added to the church of San Antón of its colour and to its sinister two sable wolves walking and in stick, on waves of azure and argent.

It has its origins in the 14th century and has remained with the same symbols since then, although its presentation has been adapted according to the destiny of the coat of arms. The durability of this shield is due to the representativeness of the symbols that appear. The navigable estuary and the stone bridge, prior to the founding of the town. The wolves, typical of the coat of arms of the founder of the town in 1300, Diego López de Haro, son of Diego Lope Díaz de Haro (Lope comes from the Latin lupus meaning 'wolf') were added by the town council to represent the founder. Later, the fortress or castle that guarded the bridge was added and, when it was demolished in 1366, it was replaced by the temple of San Antón that was built in its place and inaugurated in 1433.

=== Flag ===
The flag that represents the city is white with a red block, in a ratio of three parts long by two wide. The colours red and white are the historical ones of the villa.

The Royal Order of 30 July 1845 determined the maritime password for the population. This was defined as a white flag with an upper red die next to the pod. The die should be square and the length of its side should equal half of the pod. Previously, at least since 1511, the banner that the Bilbao Consulate was wearing was white with a red Cross of Burgundy. The relationship of the town with the mercantile and marine activities was always very strong coming to share headquarters. In 1603 the new consistorial house is inaugurated and in it the headquarters of the city council and of the referred one Bilbao Consulate are located. The intimate relationship made the flag of the Consulate was related as a flag of the town by citizenship.

The definition of the maritime flag in 1845 was assumed by the population, who accepted it as their own, and so did the city council. At the inauguration of the Bilbao-Miranda de Ebro railway line, it was already used as a symbol of the town's representation, being permanently adopted in 1895 although no resolution has been adopted for this purpose.

Although it has always been assumed by the municipal institution and citizenship, at the beginning of the 20th century it was discussed in a municipal plenary session about the determination of a flag for the town. There was talk about "the use of the crimson colour of the Lordship of Biscay, or of the cross of Saint Andrew" but without reaching any resolution to the effect.

== History ==
=== Prehistory ===
Remains of an ancient settlement were found on the top of Mount Malmasín, dating from around the 3rd or 2nd century BC. Burial sites were also found on mounts Avril and Artxanda, dated 6,000 years old. Some authors identify the old settlement of Bilbao as Amanun Portus, cited by Pliny the Elder, or with Flaviobriga, by Ptolemy.

=== Medieval Bilbao ===
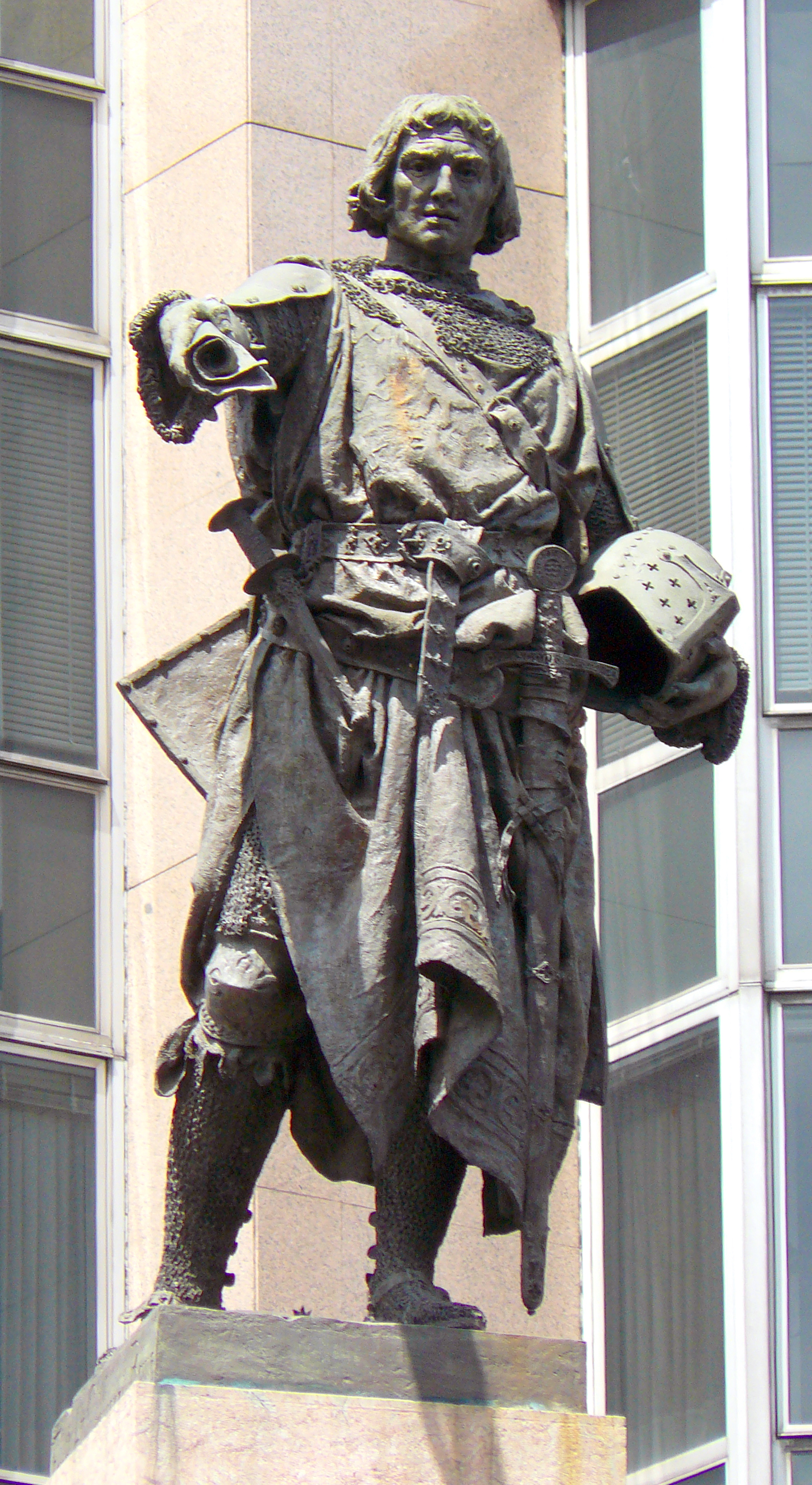
Statue of Diego López V de Haro, founder of the city

Ancient walls, which date from around the 11th century, have been discovered below the Church of San Antón. Bilbao was founded at the very end of the thirteenth century, kick-starting a period in the fourteenth century, during which approximately three-quarters of the Biscayan cities were developed, among them Portugalete in 1323, Ondarroa in 1327, Lekeitio in 1335, and Mungia and Larrabetzu in 1376. Diego López V de Haro, then third Lord of Biscay, founded Bilbao through a municipal charter dated in Valladolid on 15 June 1300 and confirmed by King Ferdinand IV of Castile in Burgos, on 4 January 1301. Diego López established the new town on the right bank of the Nervión river, on the grounds of the elizate of Begoña and granted it the fuero of Logroño, a compilation of rights and privileges that would prove fundamental to its later development.

In 1310 María Díaz I de Haro, niece of Diego López V and Lady of Biscay, grants a new municipal charter to the city, which extends its commercial privileges even further, transforming the city in a mandatory stop for all the trade coming from Castile towards the sea. This second charter established that the road from Orduña to Bermeo, at the time the most important trade route in the lordship, had to traverse the San Antón Bridge in Bilbao instead of the pass in Etxebarri, as it did until then. This strengthened the position of Bilbao as a trading post, in detriment of Bermeo, city which until then had acted as the main port of the territory. In addition, Bilbao was granted exclusive rights to all trade between the city and Las Arenas. In 1372, John I of Castile strengthened even more the city's position by naming Bilbao a free port and granting it special privileges concerning the trade of iron. This caused Bilbao to become an important port, particularly due to its trade with Flanders and Great Britain.

In 1443 the Church of Saint Anthony the Great was enshrined, having been built in the place of an old alcázar. Still today the church is one of the oldest extant buildings of the city. On 5 September 1483, the Queen Isabella I of Castile traveled to Bilbao to swear fealty to the fueros of Biscay. Her husband, Ferdinand II of Aragon had already done so in 1476 in Gernika.

=== Modern age ===
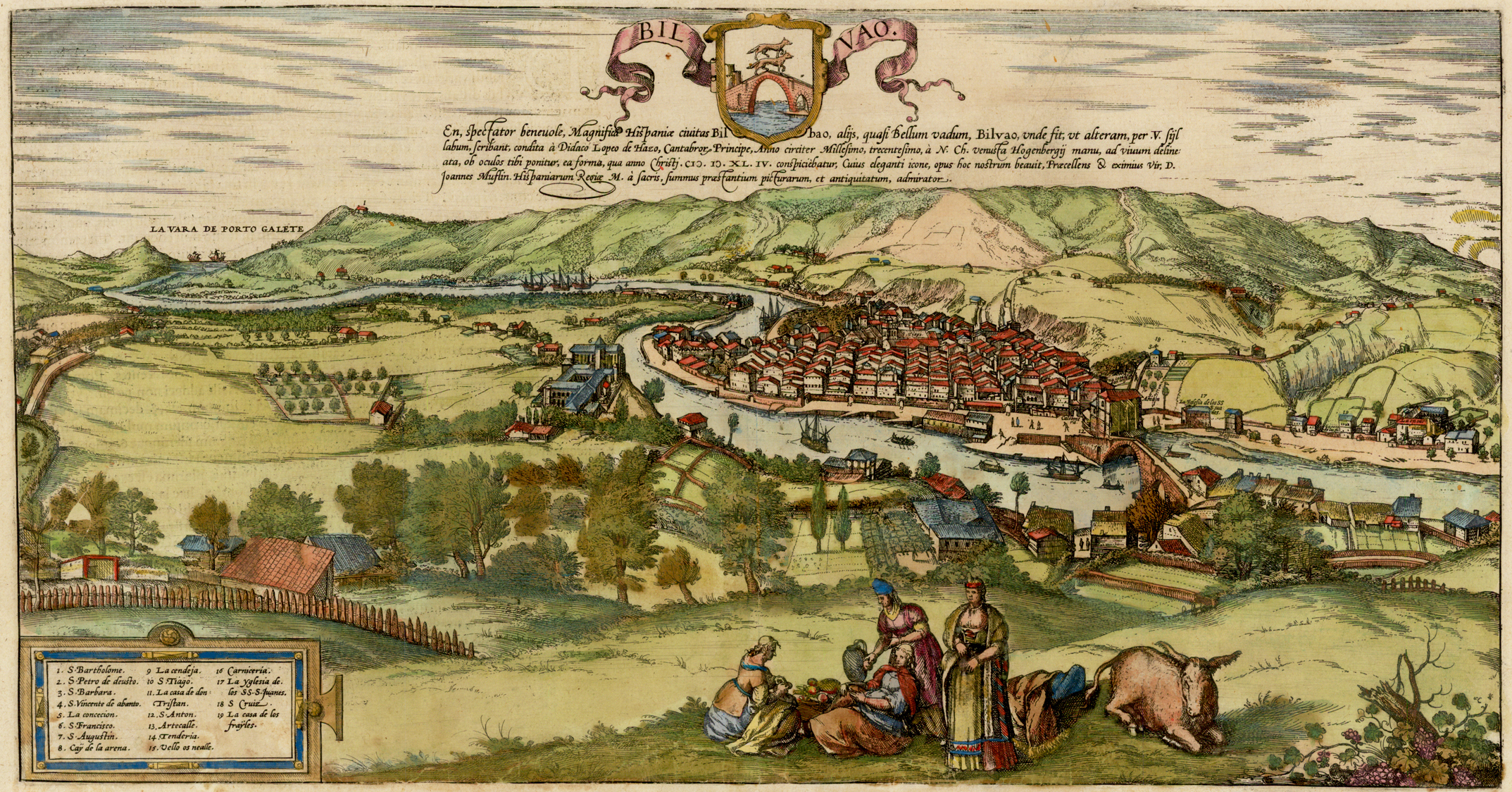
First engraving of the city, made by Franz Hohenberg in 1544

On 21 June 1511, Queen Joanna of Castile ordered the creation of the Consulate of the Sea of Bilbao. This would become the most influential institution of the borough for centuries, and would claim jurisdiction over the estuary, improving its infrastructure. Under the Consulate's control, the port of Bilbao became one of the most important of the kingdom. The first printing-press was brought to the town in 1577. Here in 1596, the first book in the Basque language was edited, entitled Doctrina Christiana en Romance y Bascuence by Dr. Betolaza.

In 1602 Bilbao was made the capital of Biscay, a title previously held by Bermeo. Around 1631, the city was the scenario of a series of revolts against the increased taxation on salt, which had been ordered by the Crown, an event locally known as the "Machinada of the salt". The revolt ended with the execution of several of its leaders. The city had seen a continuous increase of its wealth, especially after the discovery of extensive iron deposits in the surrounding mountains, and by the end of the century it managed to overcome the economic crises that affected the rest of the kingdom, thanks in part to the increased trading of wool (which now used the port of Bilbao instead of the one in Santander), and to the iron ore and its commerce with England and the Netherlands.

=== Contemporary Bilbao ===
==== Napoleonic invasion and Carlist wars ====
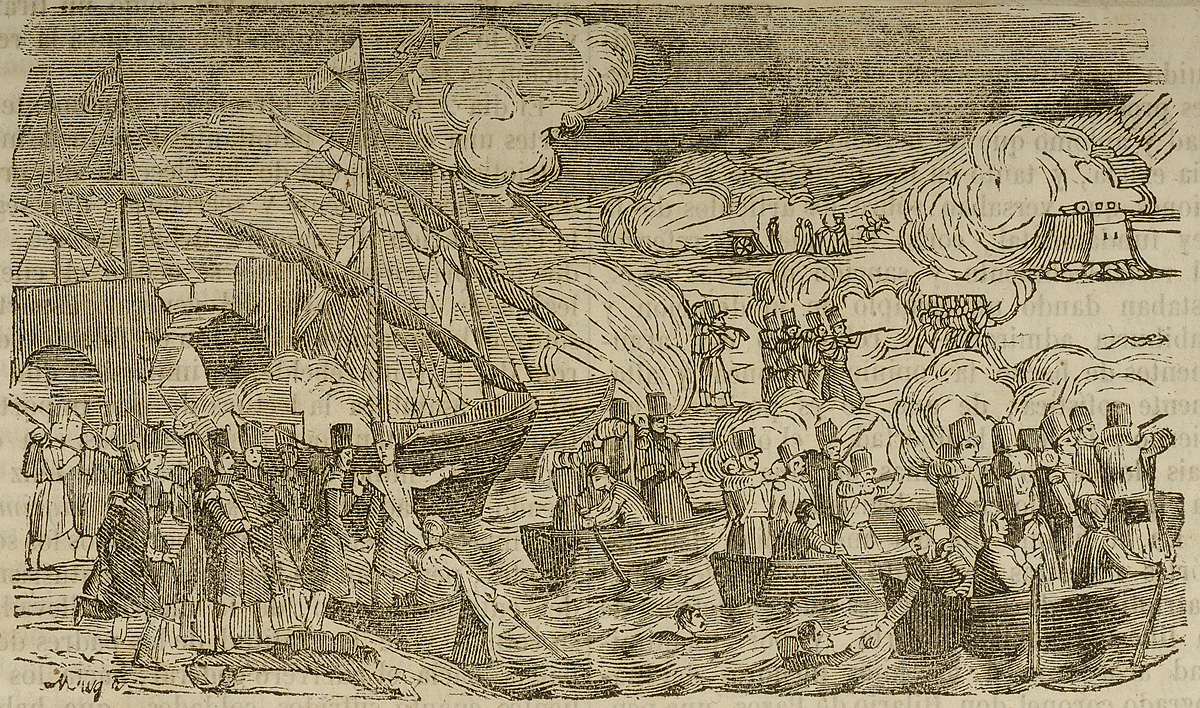
The Battle of Luchana

The French invasion of Spain saw the occupation of several Basque cities, but Bilbao was not among them. The first open uprising against Napoleonic rule took place on 6 August 1808, a month after the Battle of Bailén. French troops sieged and sacked the city, alongside the neighbouring towns of Deusto and Begoña on 16 August. Beginning in February 1810, the city was under the command of Pierre Thouvenot, general of the French army and Baron of the Empire, who had become the head of the Military Government of Vizcaya, which included the three Basque provinces. Thouvenot intended to move forward with the plan of total annexation of the Basque provinces into France, but the Peninsular War and ultimately the Battle of Vitoria made those plans impossible.

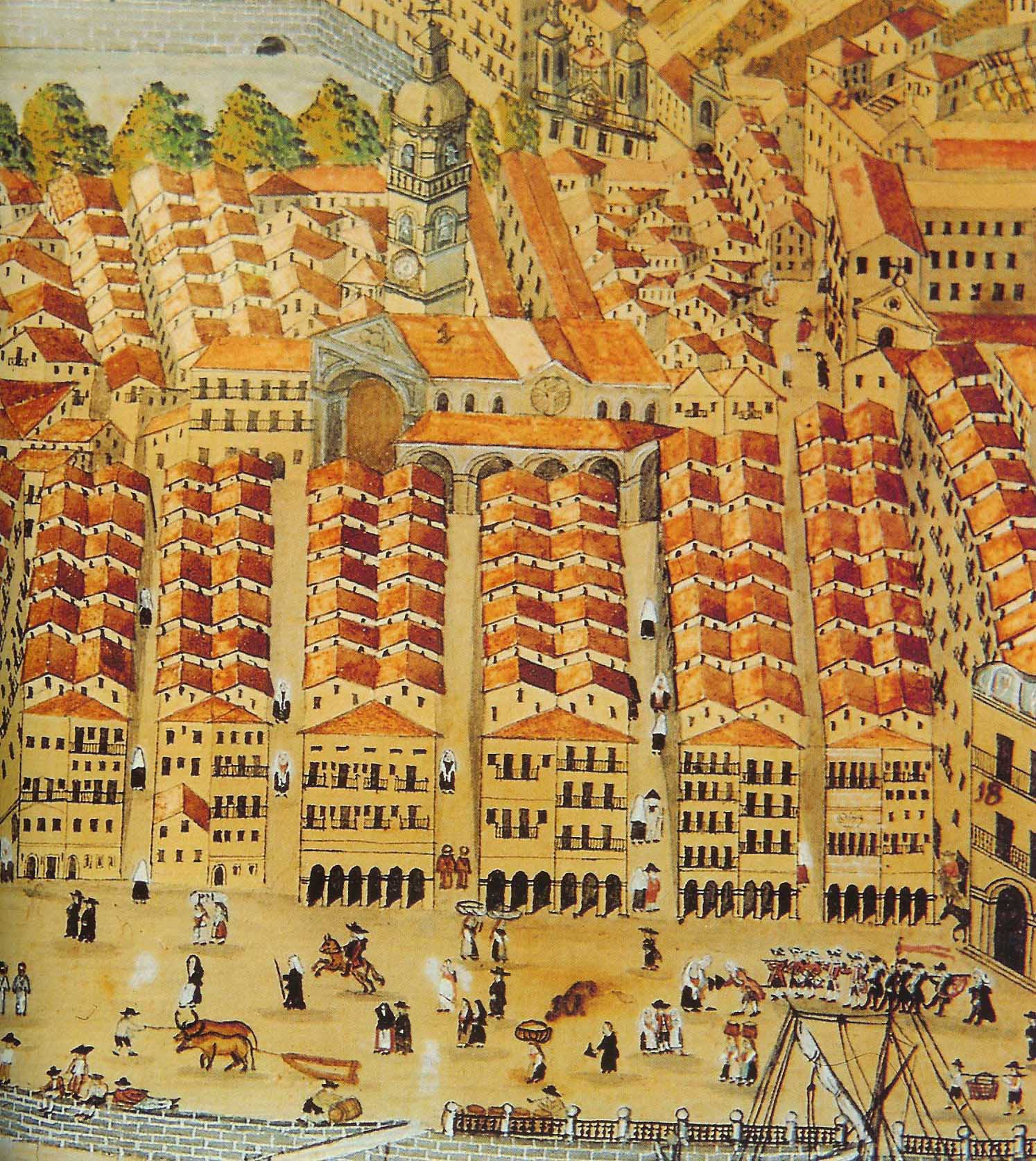
Engraving depicting the city in the 18th century

The Basque Country was one of the main sites of battles during the First Carlist War, a civil war between supporters of the Spanish regent Maria Christina, known as liberals, and those of the late king's brother Carlos of Borbón, known as Carlists. The Carlists were particularly focused on capturing Bilbao, a liberal and economic bastion in northern Spain. The Carlist general Tomás de Zumalacárregui tried to take the city during the siege of Bilbao of 1835, but he was wounded during a battle near Begoña and died some time after in the town of Zegama. The next year, the city resisted a second siege during which the liberal general Baldomero Espartero defeated the Carlists in the Battle of Luchana. The city was untouched by the Second Carlist War, which took place mostly in Catalonia, but was again an important scenario during the Third Carlist War; in April 1874 the city suffered a third siege which lasted two months.

Despite the warfare, Bilbao prospered during the nineteenth and twentieth centuries, when it rose as the economic centre of the Basque Country. It was during this time that the railway first arrived to the city and the Bank of Bilbao (which later would go on to become the BBVA) was founded, as well as the Bilbao Stock Exchange. Steelmaking industries flourished with the creation of many new factories, including the Santa Ana de Bolueta and the Altos Hornos de Vizcaya in 1902. The city was modernised with new avenues and walkways, as well as with new modern buildings such as the City Hall building, the Basurto Hospital and the Arriaga Theatre. The population increased dramatically, from 11,000 in 1880 to 80,000 in 1900. Social movements also arose, notably Basque nationalism under Sabino Arana, which in the subsequent decades would grow to become the Basque Nationalist Party.

==== Civil war and Francoist dictatorship ====
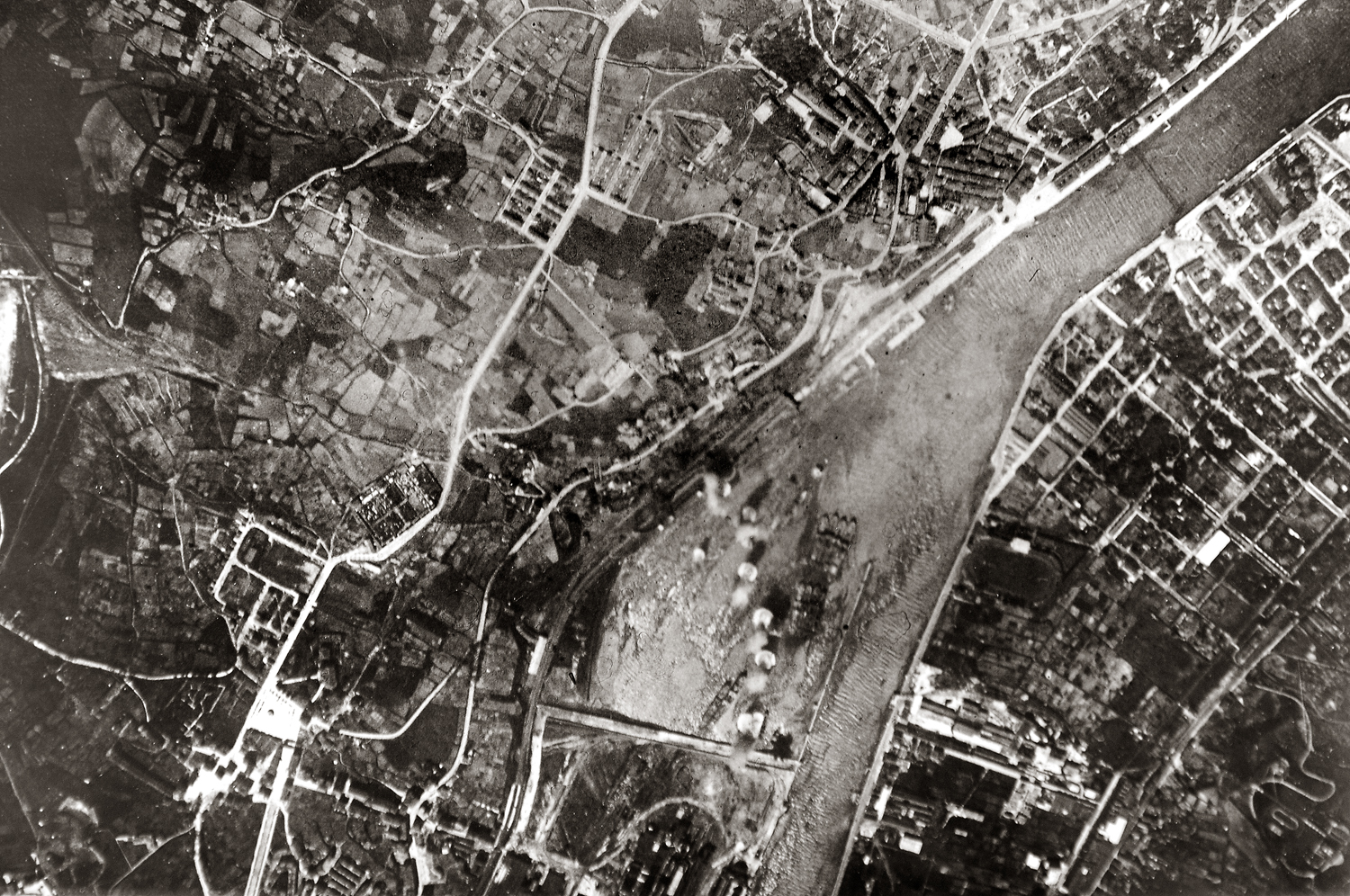
Bombing of Bilbao during the Civil War, 5 June 1937

The Spanish Civil War in Bilbao started with a number of small uprisings suppressed by the Republican forces. On 31 August 1936, the city suffered its first bombing, with multiple bombings by Nationalist bombers. In September, the Nationalists distributed pamphlets threatening further bombing if the city did not give up, which finally took place on 25 September when German planes, in coordination with Francoist forces, dropped at least a hundred bombs on the city. In May 1937, the Nationalist army besieged the town. The battle lasted until 19 June of that year, when Lieutenant Colonel Putz was ordered to destroy all bridges over the estuary, and the troops of the 5th Brigade took the borough from the mountains Malmasin, Pagasarri, and Arnotegi.

With the war over, Bilbao returned to its industrial development, accompanied by steady population growth. In the 1940s, the city was rebuilt, starting with the bridges and by 1948, the first commercial flight took off from the local airport. Over the next decade, there was a revival of the iron industry, which became a strategic industrial sector in Spain, as a consequence of the economic model promoted by Francoism. The city received migrants from other Spanish regions looking to work in the iron industry. The demand for housing outstripped supply, and workers built slums on the hillsides. It was in this context that the first social movements arose and the strike of the Euskalduna shipyard in 1947 was the first one to take place during the Francoist dictatorship. In this environment of social repression, on 31 July 1959 the separatist organisation ETA was created from Basque nationalist movements. During the 1960s the city was the scenario of several urban projects, with the creation of new neighbourhoods like Otxarkoaga and the motorway to the French border. In June 1968 the University of Bilbao, the first public university, was established. It would later be integrated into the University of the Basque Country.

==== Democracy and urban renewal ====
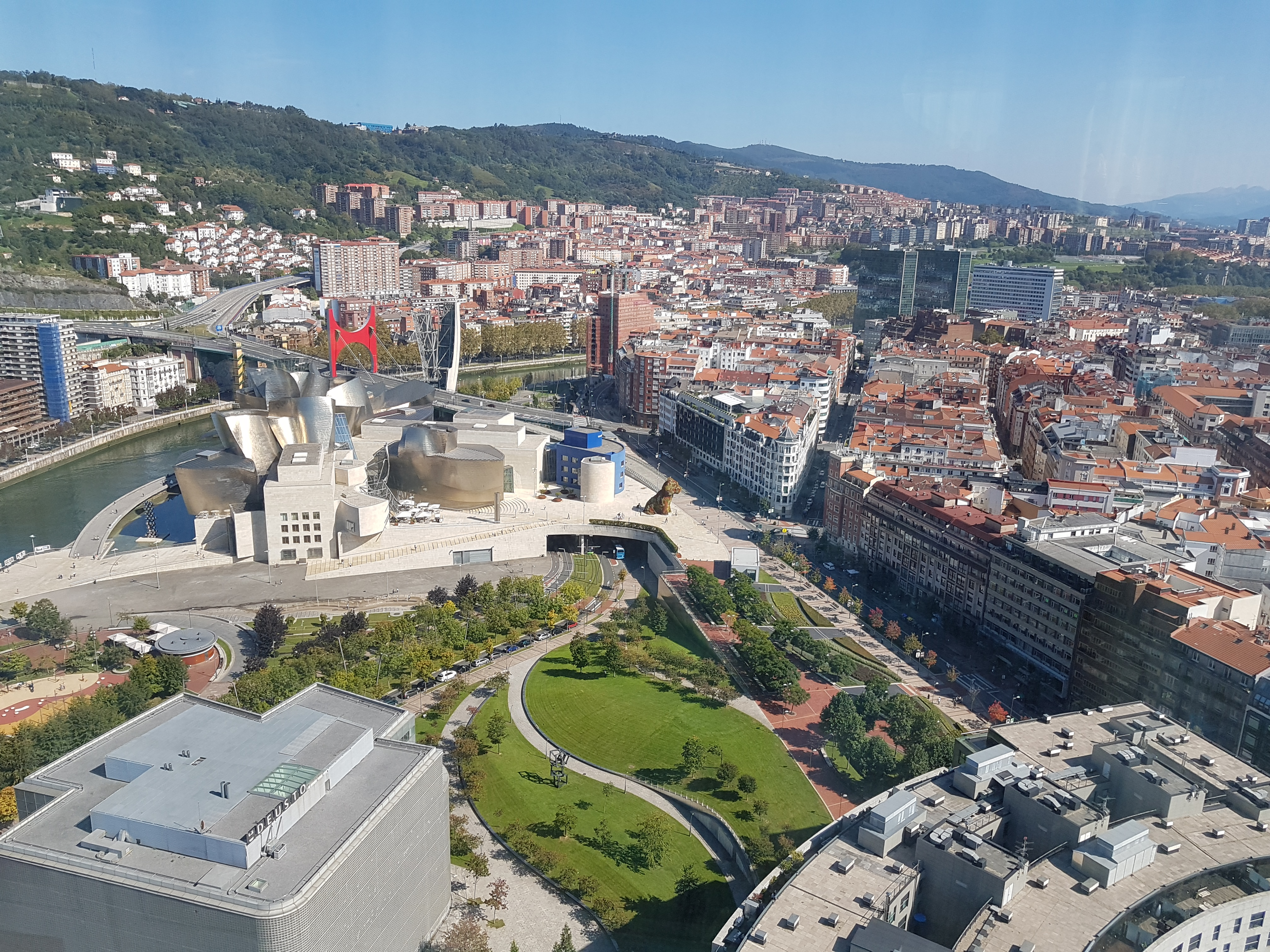
Abandoibarra and the Guggenheim Museum from the Iberdrola Tower

After the end of Francoist Spain and the establishment of a constitutional monarchy, in a process known in Spain as the transition, Bilbao was able to hold democratic elections again. This time Basque nationalists rose to power. With the approval of the Statute of Autonomy of the Basque Country in 1979, Vitoria-Gasteiz was elected the seat of the government and therefore the de facto capital of the Basque Autonomous Community, although Bilbao was larger and more powerful economically. In the 1980s, several factors such as labour demands and the arrival of cheap labour from abroad led to a devastating industrial crisis.

On 26 August 1983 during the celebration of the local festivities known as Aste Nagusia, the estuary overflowed up to five metres in some areas due to the continuous raining, killing two people and causing important destructions in the city's infrastructure, with a total economic cost that reached 60,000 million pesetas (around €360 million)

Since the mid-1990s, Bilbao has been in a process of deindustrialization and transition to a service economy, supported by investment in infrastructure and urban renewal, starting with the opening of the Bilbao Guggenheim Museum (the so-called Guggenheim effect), and continuing with the Euskalduna Conference Centre and Concert Hall, Santiago Calatrava's Zubizuri, the metro network by Norman Foster, the tram, the Iberdrola Tower and the Zorrozaurre development plan, among others. Many officially supported associations such as Bilbao Metrópoli-30 and Bilbao Ría 2000 were created to monitor these projects.

== Geography ==
Bilbao is located near the northern edge of the Iberian Peninsula, about 16 kilometres (10 mi) from the Bay of Biscay. It covers an area of 40.65 square kilometres (15.70 sq mi), of which 17.35 square kilometres (6.70 sq mi) are urban and the remaining 23.30 square kilometres (9.00 sq mi) consist of the surrounding mountains. The official average altitude is 19 metres (62 ft), although there are measurements between 6 metres (20 ft) and 32 metres (105 ft). It is also the core of the comarca of Greater Bilbao. It is surrounded by the municipalities of Derio, Etxebarri, Galdakao, Loiu, Sondika, and Zamudio to the north; Arrigorriaga and Basauri to the west; Alonsotegi to the south; and Barakaldo and Erandio to the east.

Bilbao is located on the Basque threshold, the range between the larger Cantabrian Mountains and the Pyrenees. The soil is predominantly composed of mesozoic materials (limestone, sandstone, and marl) sedimented over a primitive paleozoic base. The relief of the province is dominated by NW-SE and WNW-ESE oriented folds. The main fold is the anticline of Bilbao which runs from the municipality of Elorrio to Galdames. Inside Bilbao there are two secondary folds, one in the northeast, composed of Mounts Artxanda, Avril, Banderas, Pikota, San Bernabé, and Cabras; and other in the south, composed of Mounts Kobetas, Restaleku, Pagasarri and Arraiz. The highest point in the municipality is Mount Ganeta, of 689 metres (2,260 ft), followed by Mount Pagasarri, of 673 metres (2,208 ft), both on the border with Alonsotegi.

=== Hydrology ===
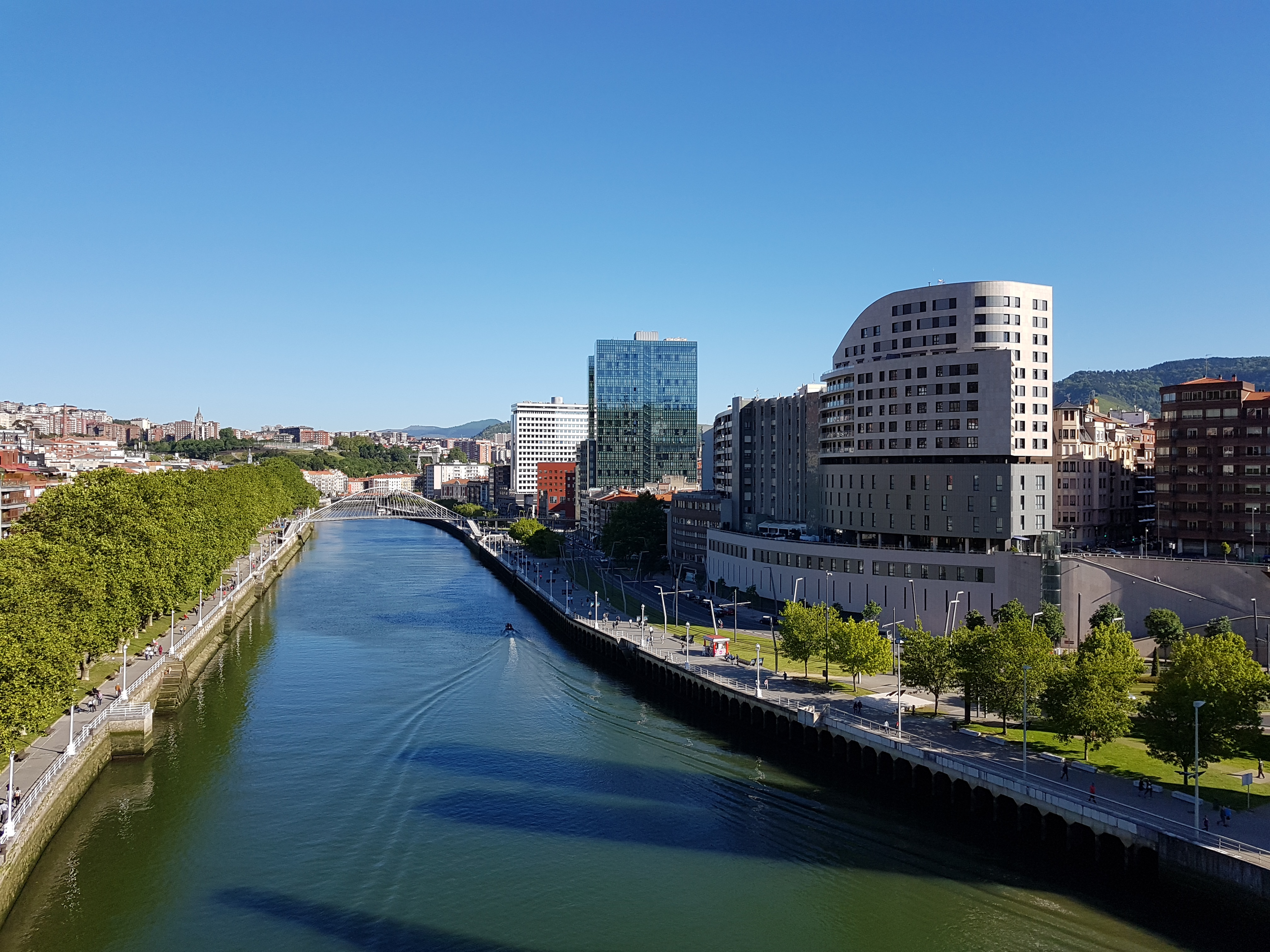
The estuary of Bilbao in the city

The main river system of Bilbao is also the hydrological artery of Biscay. The rivers Nervión and Ibaizabal converge in Basauri and form an estuary named variously "estuary of Bilbao", "of the Nervión", "of the Ibaizabal", or "of the Nervión-Ibaizabal". The estuary runs for 15 kilometres (9.3 mi) and with a low flow (with an average of 25 m^{3} (883 cu ft) per second). Its main tributary is the river Cadagua, which rises in the Mena valley and has a basin of 642 square kilometres (248 sq mi), mostly lying in the neighbouring province of Burgos. This river is also the natural border between Bilbao and Barakaldo.

The river has frequently suffered from human intervention, as seen in the dredging of its bottom, the building of docks on both banks and especially in the Deusto canal, an artificial waterway dug between 1950 and 1968 in the district of Deusto as a lateral canal, with the aim of facilitating navigation, sparing ships from the natural curves of the estuary. The project was stopped with 400 metres (1,300 ft) left to complete, and it was decided to leave it as a dock. However, in 2007, a plan was approved to continue the canal and form the island of Zorrozaurre. This human intervention has also brought negative results in the quality of the water, after decades of toxic waste dumping causing a situation of anoxia (lack of oxygen), which almost eliminated the entire fauna and flora. However, in recent years this situation is being reversed, thanks to a dumping ban and natural regeneration. Now it is possible to observe algae, tonguefishes, crabs, and seabirds, as well as occasional bathers in the summer months.

The estuary is also a natural border for several neighbourhoods and districts within the borough. Entering the municipality from the west it separates the districts of Begoña and Ibaiondo, then Abando and Uribarri and lastly Deusto and Basurto-Zorroza.

=== Climate ===
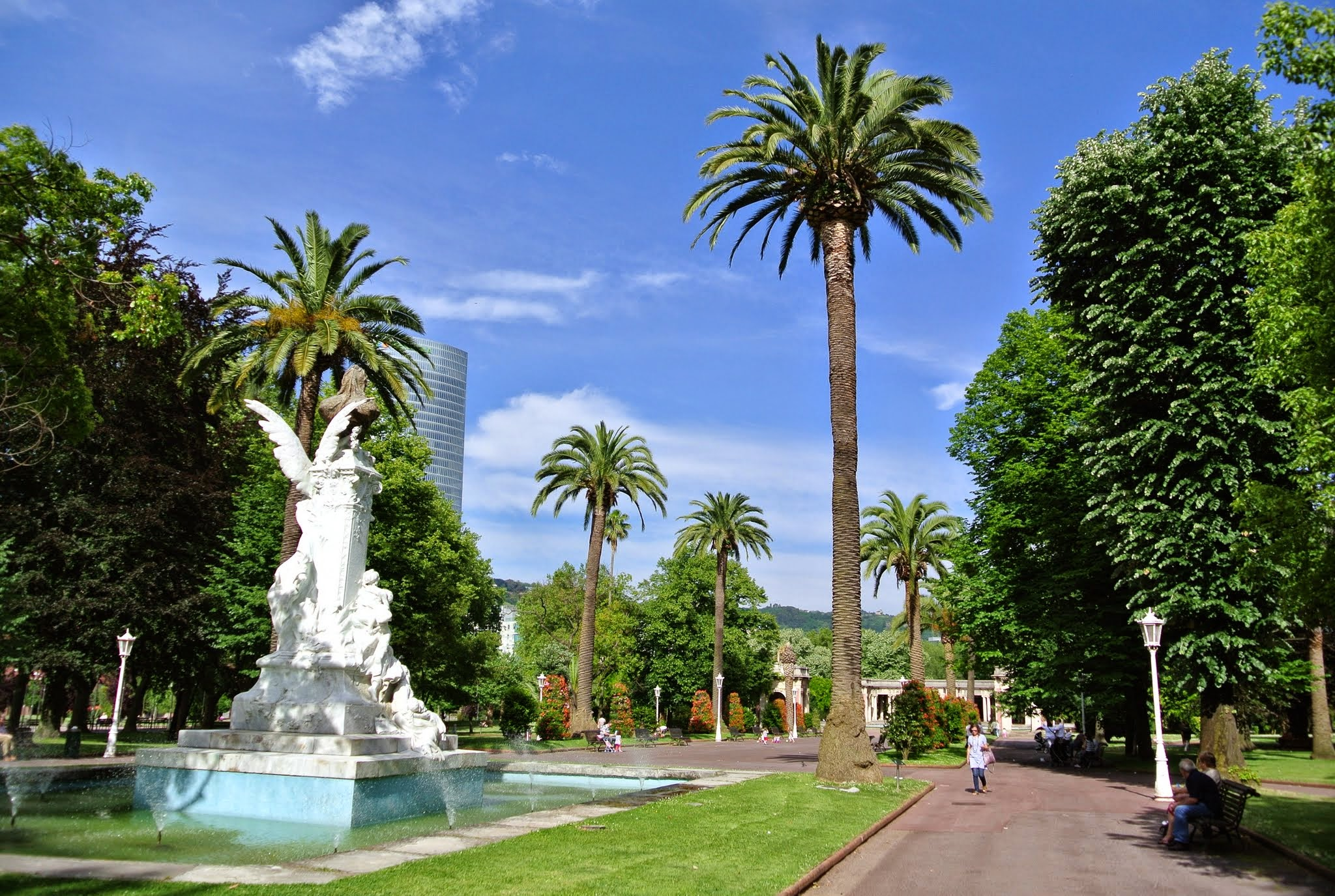
Palm trees during a sunny day in Bilbao

Its proximity to the Bay of Biscay gives Bilbao an oceanic climate (Cfb), with precipitation occurring throughout the year and without a well-defined dry summer. The rainiest season is between October and April, November being the wettest. Snow is not frequent in Bilbao, although it is possible to see snow on the top of the surrounding mountains. Sleet is more frequent, about 10 days per year, mainly in the winter months. Bilbao is nearest to the subtropical boundary of all the Atlantic coastal cities in the country with an August daily mean of 20.9 °C (69.6 °F). There is also a drying trend in summer with only around 50 millimetres (2.0 in) of rainfall in July – but not dry enough to be considered Mediterranean.

The proximity of the ocean also means that the two best defined seasons (summer and winter) remain mild, with low intensity thermal oscillations. Average maximum temperatures vary between 25 and 26 °C (77.0 and 78.8 °F) in the summer months, while the average minimum in winter is between 6 and 7 °C (42.8 and 44.6 °F).

Extreme record observations in Bilbao are 44.0 °C (111.2 °F) maximum (on 23 August 2023) and −8.6 °C (16.5 °F) minimum (on 3 February 1963). The maximum precipitation in a day was 225.6 mm (9 in) on 26 August 1983 when severe flooding was caused by the Nervión river.

Climate data for Bilbao airport (1991–2020 normals, extremes 1947-present)
Month	Jan	Feb	Mar	Apr	May	Jun	Jul	Aug	Sep	Oct	Nov	Dec	Year
Record high °C (°F)	25.1 (77.2)	27.1 (80.8)	30.1 (86.2)	33.1 (91.6)	36.4 (97.5)	41.2 (106.2)	42.0 (107.6)	44.0 (111.2)	41.7 (107.1)	36.7 (98.1)	27.7 (81.9)	25.2 (77.4)	44.0 (111.2)
Mean maximum °C (°F)	19.3 (66.7)	21.0 (69.8)	24.8 (76.6)	26.9 (80.4)	29.8 (85.6)	34.2 (93.6)	35.8 (96.4)	36.6 (97.9)	34.1 (93.4)	29.3 (84.7)	23.3 (73.9)	20.1 (68.2)	38.2 (100.8)
Mean daily maximum °C (°F)	13.5 (56.3)	14.2 (57.6)	16.6 (61.9)	18.1 (64.6)	21.0 (69.8)	23.5 (74.3)	25.4 (77.7)	26.3 (79.3)	24.5 (76.1)	21.5 (70.7)	16.6 (61.9)	14.1 (57.4)	19.6 (67.3)
Daily mean °C (°F)	9.5 (49.1)	9.7 (49.5)	11.6 (52.9)	13.1 (55.6)	16.0 (60.8)	18.7 (65.7)	20.6 (69.1)	21.2 (70.2)	19.2 (66.6)	16.6 (61.9)	12.5 (54.5)	10.1 (50.2)	14.9 (58.8)
Mean daily minimum °C (°F)	5.3 (41.5)	5.1 (41.2)	6.7 (44.1)	8.1 (46.6)	11.0 (51.8)	13.8 (56.8)	15.8 (60.4)	16.1 (61.0)	13.9 (57.0)	11.6 (52.9)	8.3 (46.9)	6.1 (43.0)	10.2 (50.3)
Mean minimum °C (°F)	−1.6 (29.1)	−1.4 (29.5)	0.4 (32.7)	2.1 (35.8)	5.4 (41.7)	9.1 (48.4)	11.4 (52.5)	11.6 (52.9)	8.9 (48.0)	5.2 (41.4)	1.1 (34.0)	−0.8 (30.6)	−3.2 (26.2)
Record low °C (°F)	−7.6 (18.3)	−8.6 (16.5)	−5.0 (23.0)	−1.2 (29.8)	0.4 (32.7)	3.6 (38.5)	6.6 (43.9)	6.8 (44.2)	3.8 (38.8)	0.6 (33.1)	−6.2 (20.8)	−7.4 (18.7)	−8.6 (16.5)
Average precipitation mm (inches)	130 (5.1)	109 (4.3)	98 (3.9)	97 (3.8)	76 (3.0)	58 (2.3)	52 (2.0)	53 (2.1)	75 (3.0)	112 (4.4)	171 (6.7)	127 (5.0)	1,158 (45.6)
Average precipitation days	12.8	11.1	10.5	12.0	10.3	7.2	7.4	7.4	8.9	10.7	13.7	12.4	124.4
Average snowy days	0.3	0.7	0.3	0	0	0	0	0	0	0	0.1	0.3	1.7
Average relative humidity (%)	73	70	68	69	69	71	72	71	72	71	74	73	71
Mean monthly sunshine hours	81	96	136	144	177	180	186	183	162	130	84	81	1,640
Percentage possible sunshine	28	32	36	36	38	39	40	43	43	38	29	28	36
Source 1: Agencia Estatal de Meteorología (AEMET)
Source 2: Agencia Estatal de Meteorología

== Demographics ==
Historical population
Year	Pop.	±%
1842	15,963	—
1857	29,056	+82.0%
1877	42,899	+47.6%
1887	61,912	+44.3%
1900	92,284	+49.1%
1910	106,302	+15.2%
1920	135,625	+27.6%
1930	158,597	+16.9%
1940	194,194	+22.4%
1950	218,519	+12.5%
1960	296,664	+35.8%
1970	405,908	+36.8%
1981	433,115	+6.7%
1991	369,839	−14.6%
2001	349,972	−5.4%
2011	351,356	+0.4%
2021	345,749	−1.6%
Source: INE

According to INE, the population of Bilbao is 347,342 people as of 2024, distributed on a land area of 40.59 km^{2} (16 sq mi), making Bilbao the largest city by population of the Basque Autonomous Community and of the Basque Country as a whole. Bilbao makes the main component of the Bilbao metropolitan area, with a population of 1,037,847 people.

The first credible data on the population of Bilbao are post-1550. It is known that in 1530 Biscay had approximately 65,000 inhabitants, a number that could have been reduced by plagues that struck the city in 1517, 1530, 1564–68, and 1597–1601, the last being especially devastating. This trend for periodic reverses in population growth was maintained until the nineteenth century. Since then, Bilbao has experienced an exponential growth in population thanks to industrialisation. After a peak of 433,115 inhabitants in 1982, the municipalities of the Txorierri valley were removed from Bilbao, with the corresponding loss of their population.

Spanish is the most spoken language in the city, followed by the Basque language. According to the city government of Bilbao, at least 51% of the population can speak "some Basque", while 29% consider themselves to be fluent.

=== Migration ===
Foreign population by country of birth (2024)
Nationality	Population
Colombia	9,743
Morocco	5,196
Bolivia	4,309
Venezuela	4,244
Nicaragua	3,645
Paraguay	2,657
Ecuador	1,939
Romania	1,797
China	1,791
Peru	1,679
Brazil	1,321
Argentina	1,316
Algeria	1,235
Honduras	1,020
Senegal	946

Out of the 355,731 people residing in Bilbao in 2009, only 114,220 (32.1%) were born inside the municipality. Of the remainder, 114,908 were born in other Biscayan towns, while 9,545 were born in the other two Basque provinces, and 85,789 came from the rest of Spain (mainly Castile-León and Galicia).

As of 2024, the foreign-born population of the city is 56,629, equal to 16.3% of the total population. As of 2007, there are 127 different nationalities registered in Bilbao, although 60 of them represent fewer than 10 people each. As of 2024, the largest foreign communities are Colombians and Moroccans, with 9,743 and 5,196 respectively. Other nationalities with more than 1,000 inhabitants are Bolivians (4,309), Venezuelans (4,244), Nicaraguans (3,645), Paraguayans (2,657), Ecuadorians (1,939) and Romanians (1,797).

== Government ==
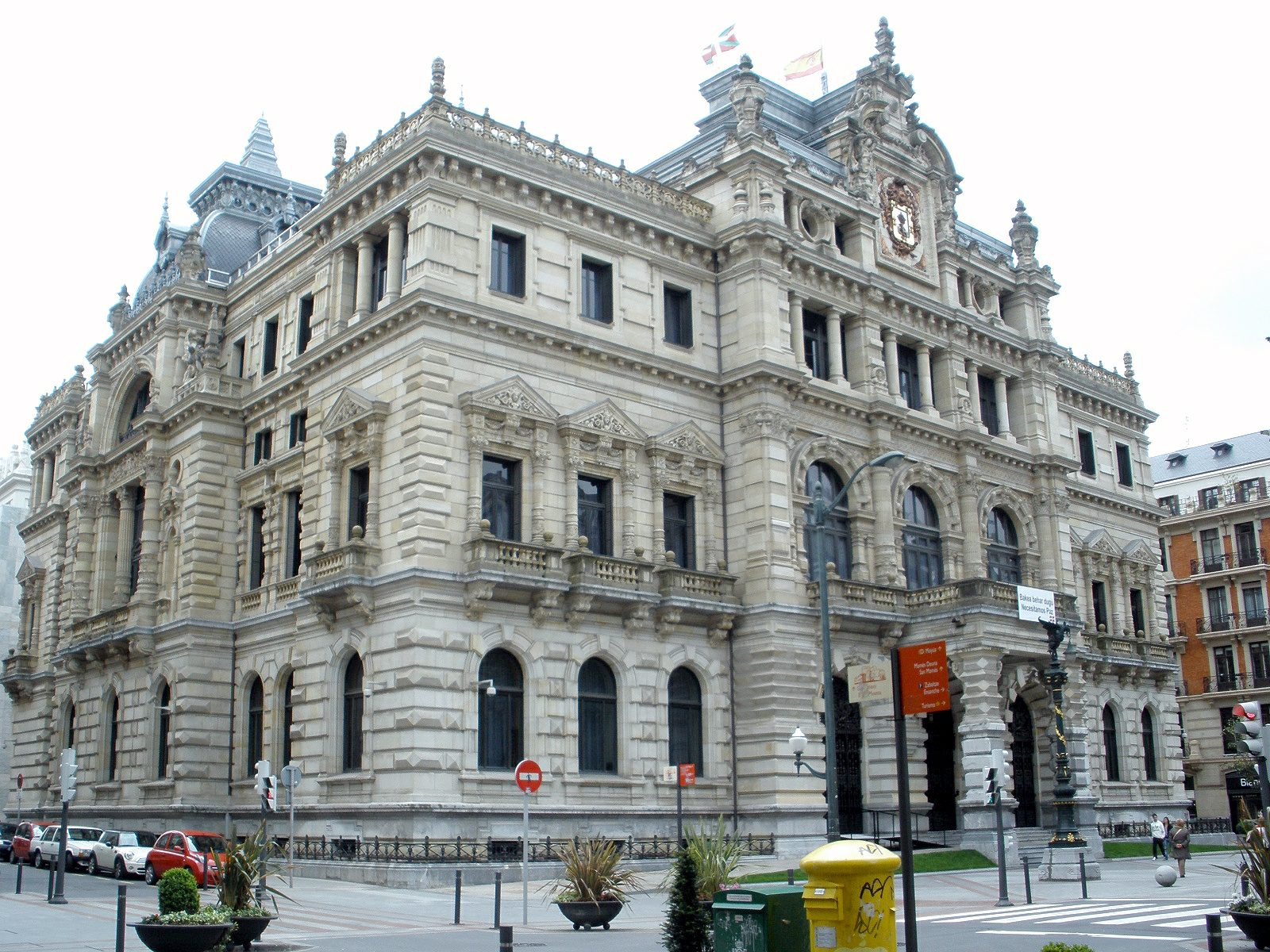
Building of the provincial government of Biscay

The city of Bilbao is the capital of the province of Biscay and as such it is home of the administrative entities that pertain to the provincial administration, both from the autonomous and central governments. Settled in the city are the provincial delegations of the different departments of the Basque autonomous government, each coordinated by a representative. In addition, the Government of Spain has the official Government Subdelegation in the city.

=== Municipal government ===
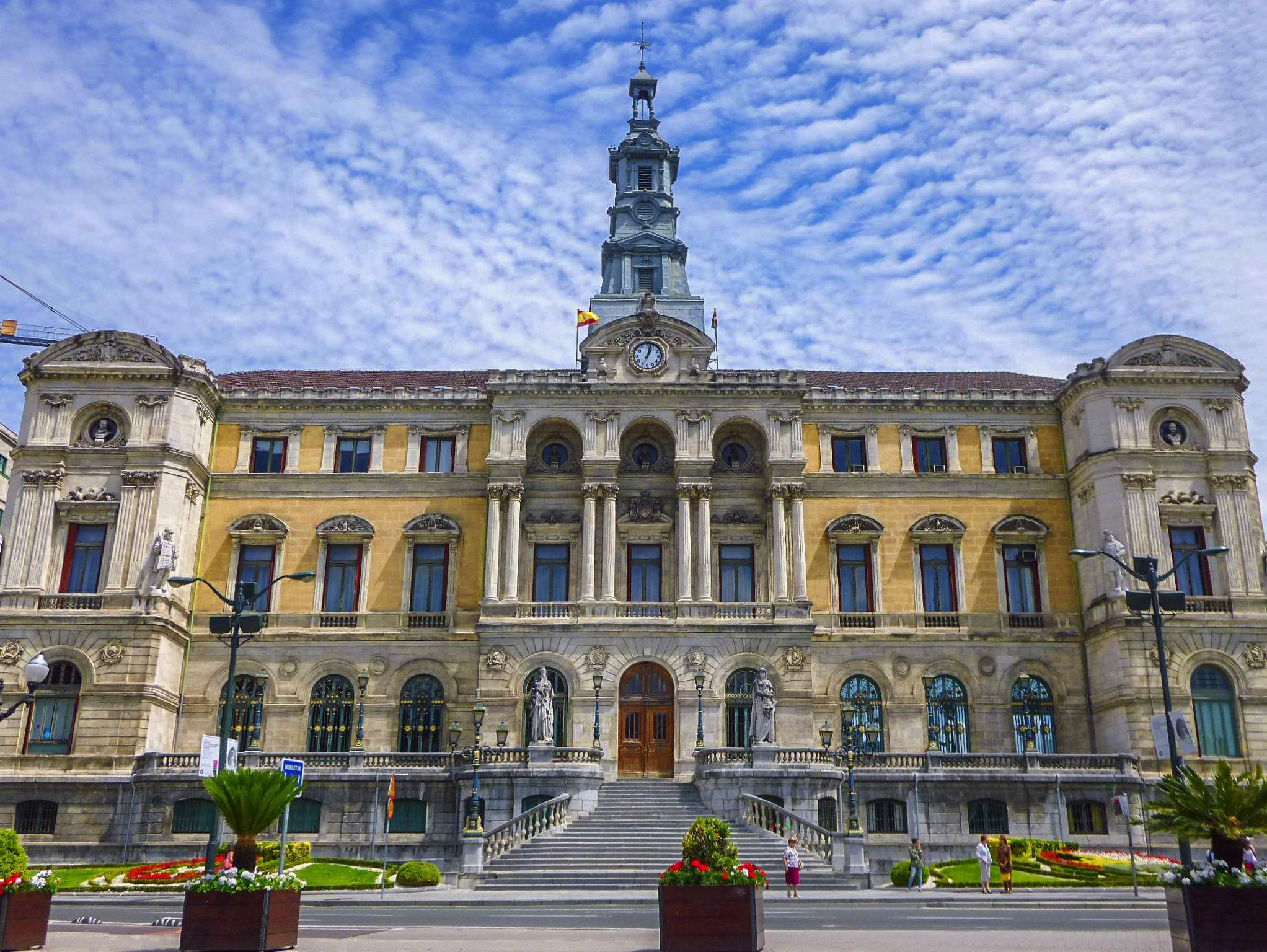
The Bilbao City Hall

Bilbao is a municipality and has a mayor-council government system. The municipal government is elected for four-year terms by universal suffrage and it is divided into two branches, executive and legislative. The legislative side consists of a municipal plenum composed of 29 councillors. These councillors represent the different political parties elected in the local elections, for which can vote all residents registered in the city who are citizens of Spain or of any member state of the European Union. The executive branch is composed of the mayor and a board of governors. The number of members of the board cannot be more than a third the number of members of the legislative plenum and the mayor can appoint them at his or her own discretion.

Since 1892 the seat of the government has been the Bilbao City Hall, located on the centric Ernesto Erkoreka Plaza and by the Estuary of Bilbao. It is the fourth city hall building to have been used since the year 1300. The first three city halls were located by the San Antón Church but were destroyed due to floodings. The current building was designed by the Spanish architect Joaquín Rucoba in Baroque style and was built in the former site of the San Agustín Monastery, which was destroyed during the First Carlist War. Since the Spanish transition to democracy, the city has been governed by the Basque Nationalist Party, often with support of the Socialist Party of the Basque Country. Iñaki Azkuna served as mayor from 1999 until his passing in 2014, when he was replaced by Ibon Areso. Azkuna was awarded the World Mayor prize in 2012. Since the 2019 municipal election, the councillors of the plenum have the following political distribution: 14 seats for the Basque Nationalist Party, 5 seats for the Socialist Party of the Basque Country, 4 seats for the EH Bildu coalition, 3 seats for Udalberri and 3 seats for the People's Party. The mayor is Juan Mari Aburto, chosen with 19 votes from the Basque Nationalist Party and the Socialist party.

In 2008 and 2010, Bilbao won the Municipal Transparency Prize, awarded by the Spanish division of Transparency International. In 2009 it came second, after Sant Cugat del Vallés.

=== Districts ===
The municipality is divided into eight districts (Basque: barrutia) which are further subdivided into 34 neighbourhoods (Basque: auzoa). Most of the districts and neighbourhoods were former independent municipalities and elizates that were eventually annexed into the city. Originally, the city of Bilbao comprised the Old Town and some houses on the left side of the estuary, today known as Bilbao la Vieja. The first expansion included the annexation of the elizate of Begoña and the river side of Uribarri. In the 19th century the merge of Abando into the city brought along small neighbourhoods of farm houses and hamlets that were clustered close to the former municipality's town hall and the Mount Cobetas, such as Errekalde and Basurto. Starting in the 20th century it started annexing the elizates on the right bank of the river, including Begoña and Deusto. In the decade of 1960 as an effort to stop the increasing problem of slums, new neighbourhoods were created from the ground up, among them Otxarkoaga and Txurdinaga, which were joined together as a new district, Otxarkoaga-Txurdinaga in the decade of 1990.

#	District	Neighbourhoods	Population (2009)	Area (km^{2})	Density	Location
1	Deusto	Arangoiti, Ibarrekolanda, San Ignacio-Elorrieta, and San Pedro de Deusto-La Rivera.	51,656	4.95	10,436	
2	Uribarri	Castaños, Matiko-Ciudad Jardín, Uribarri, and Zurbaran-Arabella.	38,335	4.19	9,149	
3	Otxarkoaga-Txurdinaga	Otxarkoaga and Txurdinaga.	28,518	3.90	7,312	
4	Begoña	Begoña, Bolueta, and Santutxu.	43,030	1.77	24,311	
5	Ibaiondo	Atxuri, Bilbao La Vieja, Casco Viejo, Iturralde, La Peña, Miribilla, San Adrián, San Francisco, Solokoetxe, and Zabala.	61,029	9.65	6,324	
6	Abando	Abando and Indautxu.	51,718	2.14	24,167	
7	Errekalde	Amezola, Iralabarri, Iturrigorri-Peñascal, Errekaldeberri-Larraskitu, and Uretamendi.	47,787	6.96	6,866	
8	Basurto-Zorroza	Altamira, Basurto, Olabeaga, Masustegi-Monte Caramelo, and Zorrotza.	33,658	7.09	4,747	

== Economy ==
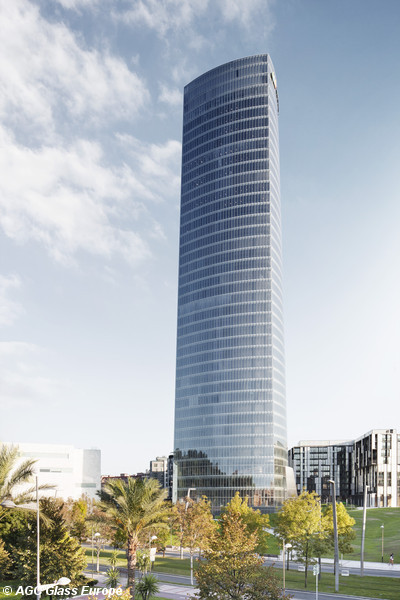
Headquarters of Iberdrola

The Bilbao metropolitan area comprises about 47% of the total population of the Basque autonomous community, out of which a 15% is registered in the municipality of Bilbao. The comarca of Greater Bilbao, in which the city occupies a central position, has a GDP per capita of €30,860, higher than the Spanish and European Union averages. The Bilbao metropolitan area has a nominal GDP amounting to $36,9 billion. Bilbao has been the economic centre of the Basque autonomous community since the original establishment of the Consulate of the Sea in the city in the 16th century, mostly thanks to the commerce in Castilian products on the town's port. It was in the 19th century when the city experienced its biggest economic development, mainly based on the exploitation of the nearby iron mines and siderurgy, both of which promoted maritime traffic and port activity and eventually the development of a very important shipbuilding industry.

=== Banking ===
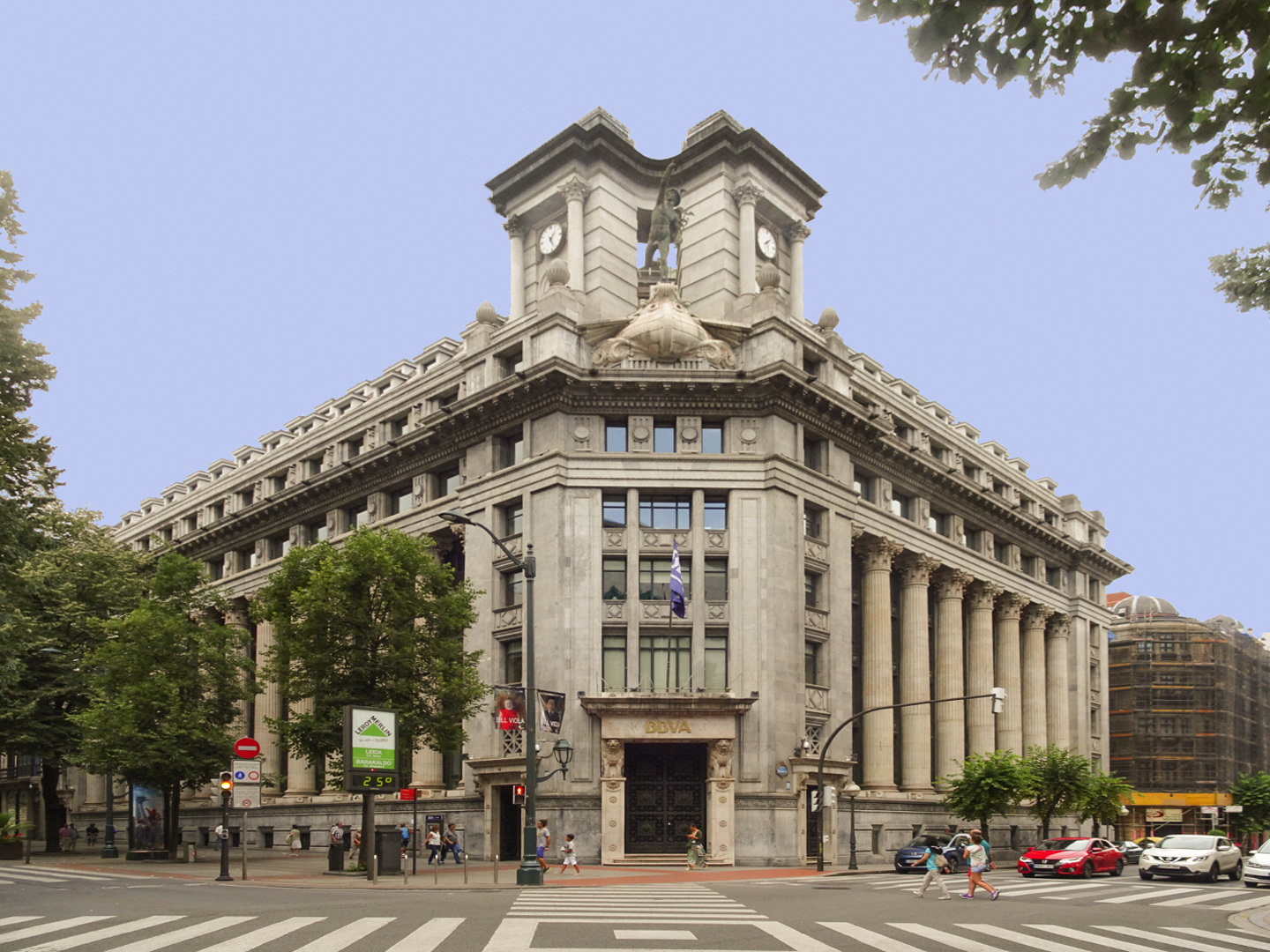
Headquarters of BBVA

Banking became an important sector with the establishment of the Bank of Bilbao (Spanish: Banco de Bilbao) in 1857 and the Bank of Biscay (Spanish: Banco de Vizcaya) in 1901. These two entities merged in 1988 creating the BBV, which finally merged with Argentaria bank in 1999, creating the current multinational corporation, the BBVA. The savings banks that were established locally, the Municipal Savings Bank of Bilbao (Spanish: Caja de Ahorros Municipal de Bilbao) in 1907 and the Provincial Savings Bank of Biscay (Spanish: Caja de Ahorros Provincial de Vizcaya) in 1921, would merge in 1990 to form the Bilbao Bizkaia Kutxa (BBK), which would merge again in 2012 with other Basque financial entities (Kutxa and Caja Vital Kutxa) to form Kutxabank. There is also the Chamber of Commerce, Industry and Navigation of Bilbao and the Stock Exchange Market of Bilbao, founded in 1890.

=== Port ===
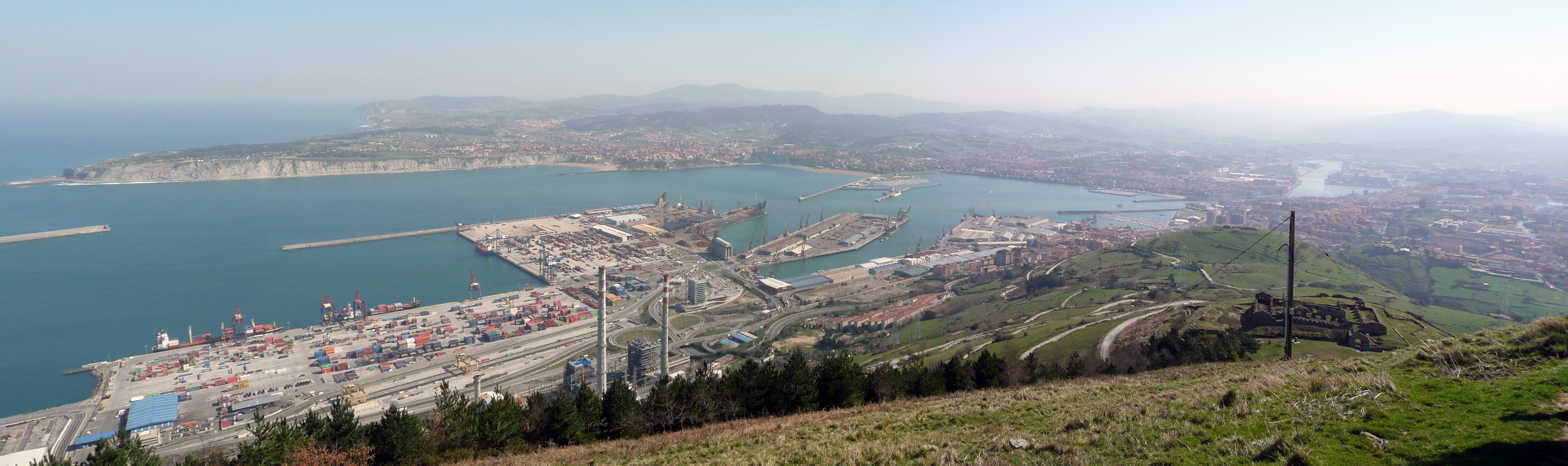
Panoramic view of the outer port, as seen from Mount Serantes

The historical port was located in what is today an area called the Arenal, a few steps from the old city, until the late 19th century. In 1902, an exterior port was built at the mouth of the estuary, in the coastal municipality of Santurtzi. Further extensions to the outer port, which became called "the super-port", led to the final move of the city portuary facilities in the 1970s, finally replacing the docks in the centre of the city, with the exception of those located in the neighbourhood of Zorrotza, still active.

The port of Bilbao is a first-class commercial port and is among the top five of Spain. Over 200 regular maritime services link Bilbao with 500 ports worldwide. At the close of 2009 cargo movements amounted to 31.6 million tonnes, Russia, the United Kingdom, the Netherlands and the Nordic countries being the main markets. In the first semester of 2008, it received over 67,000 passengers and 2,770 ships. This activity contributed €419 million to the Basque GDP and maintains almost 10,000 jobs.

=== Mining and ironworks ===
Iron is the main and most abundant raw material found in Biscay, and its extraction has been legally regulated since 1526. Mining was the main primary activity in Bilbao and the minerals, of great quality, were exported to all over Europe. It was not until the second half of the nineteenth century that an ironworks industry was developed, benefiting from the resources and the city's good communication links. In the 20th century, both Spanish and European capitals imported around 90% of the iron from Biscay. Although World War I made Bilbao one of the main ironworks powers, a subsequent crisis prompted a decline in the activity.

=== Tourism ===
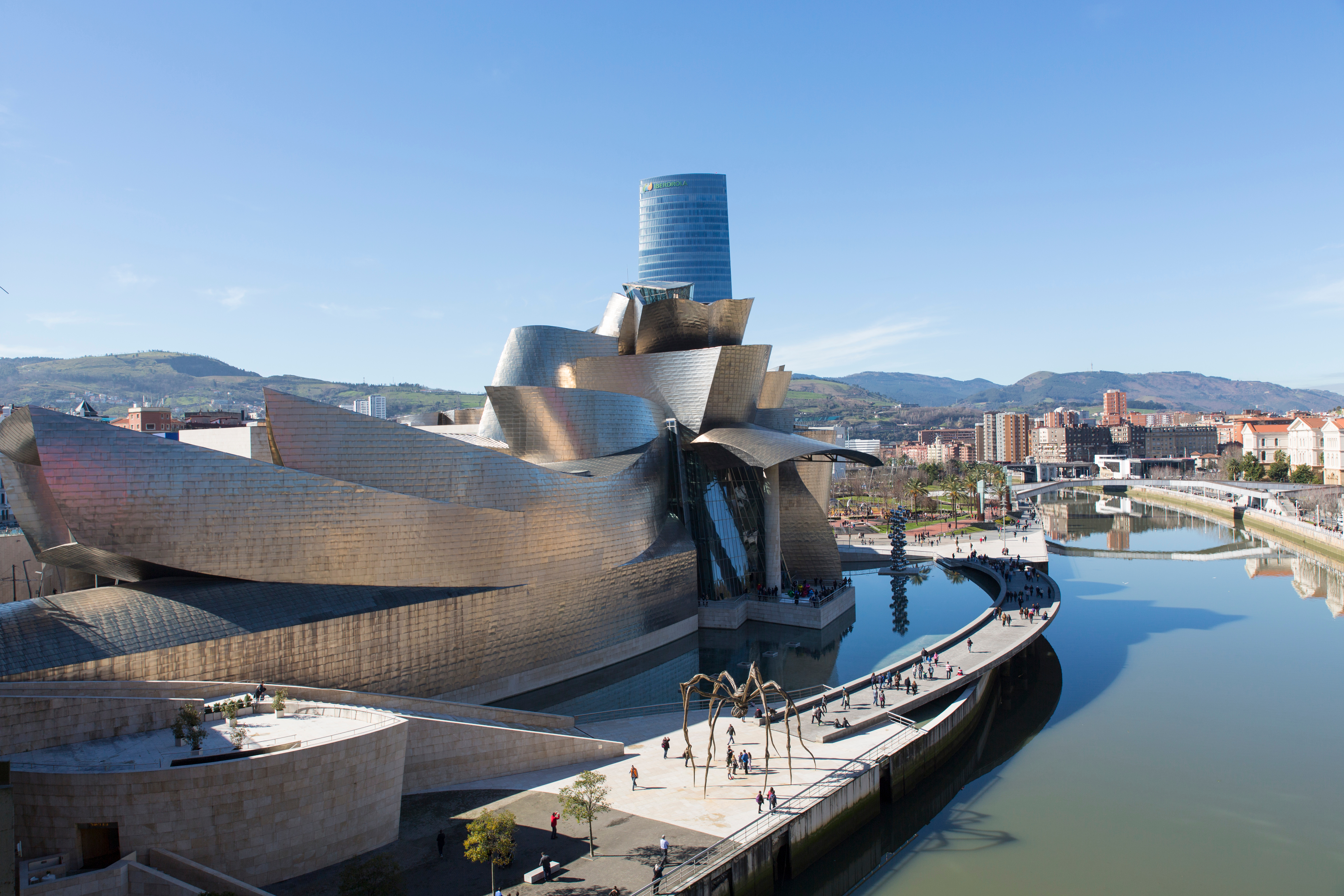
Guggenheim Museum Bilbao

The first notion of Bilbao as a tourist destination came with the inauguration of the railway between Bilbao and the coastal neighbourhood of Las Arenas, in the municipality of Getxo in 1872. The connection made Bilbao a minor beach destination.

The real tourist surge though would come much later with the inauguration of the Guggenheim Museum Bilbao in 1997. Thereafter tourist arrivals registered a continued upward trend, reaching over 932,000 visitors in 2018. The trend was exponential considering that in 1995, Bilbao only counted 25,000 tourists. Bilbao also hosts 31% of the total Basque Country visitors, being the top destination of this autonomous community, outranking San Sebastián. The majority of tourists are domestic visitors, coming from Madrid and Catalonia. International travellers are predominantly French, crossing the border just to the east. The others arrive from the United Kingdom, Germany, and Italy. Tourism generates about €300 million yearly for the Biscayan GDP. Bilbao also draws business tourism, having been equipped with facilities like the Euskalduna Conference Centre and Concert Hall, and the Bilbao Exhibition Centre, in nearby Barakaldo.

=== Stock exchange ===
Plans to create a stock exchange market in Bilbao began in the early 19th century, even though it would not be realized until 21 July 1890. Bilbao's institution is one of the country's four regional stock exchanges, joining Barcelona, Madrid, and Valencia as Spain's commercial centres. It is owned by Bolsas y Mercados Españoles.

== Cityscape ==
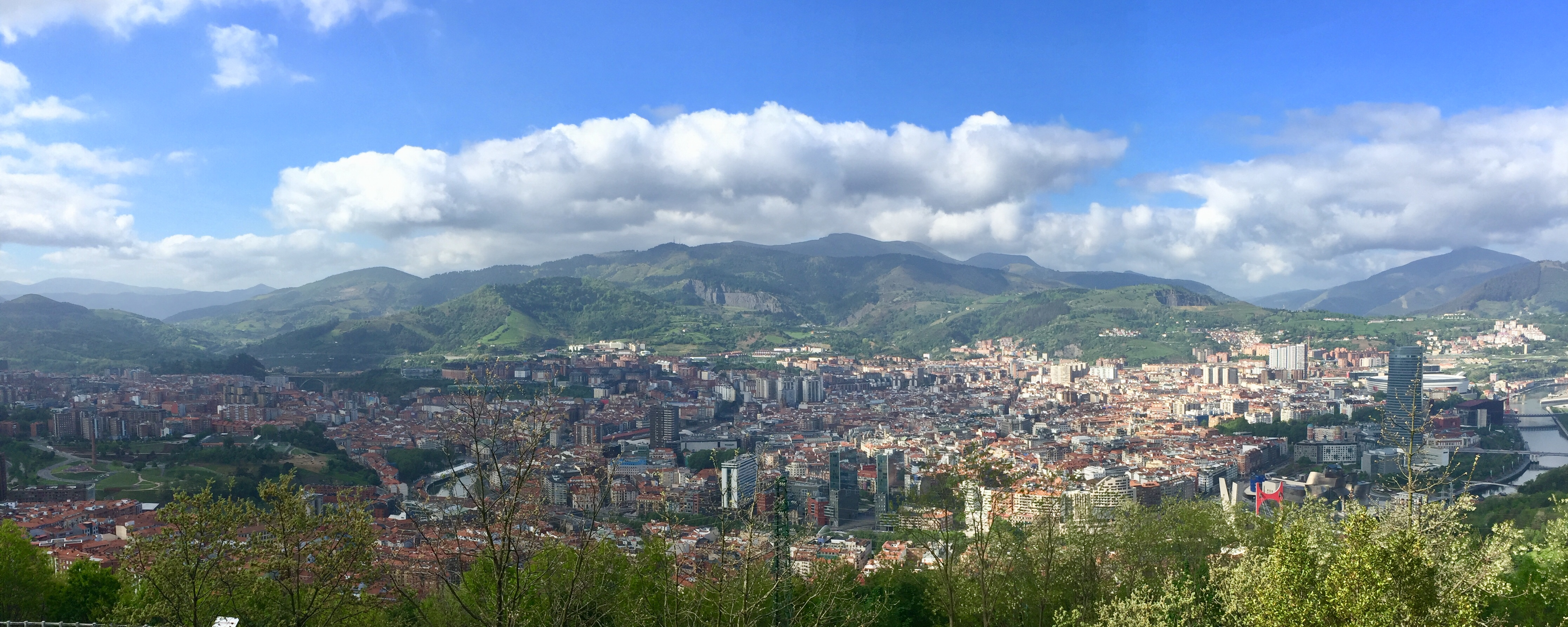
A panoramic view of Bilbao taken from Mount Artxanda

=== Urban planning ===
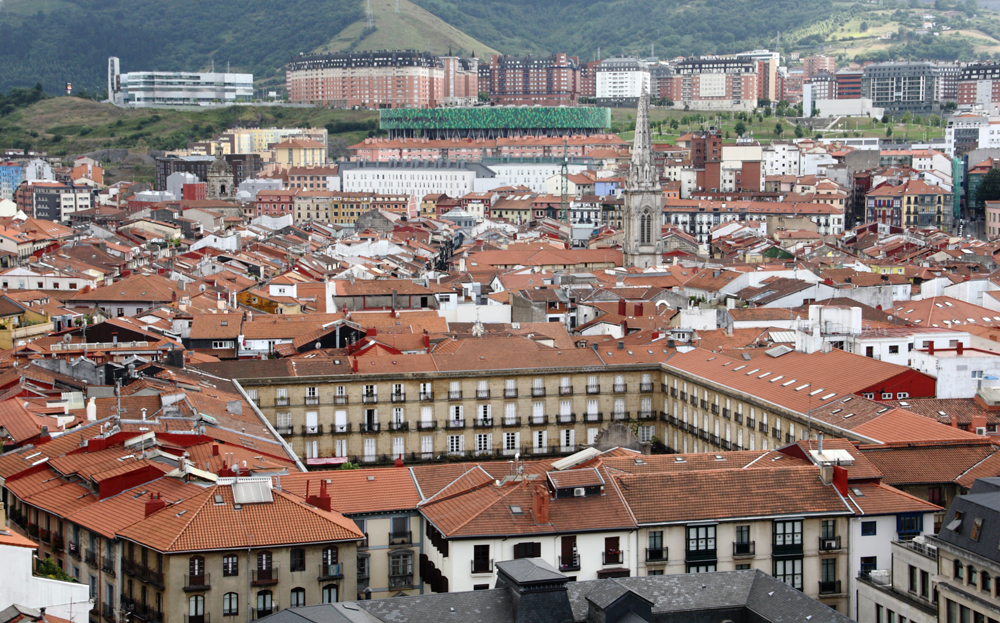
The Old Town

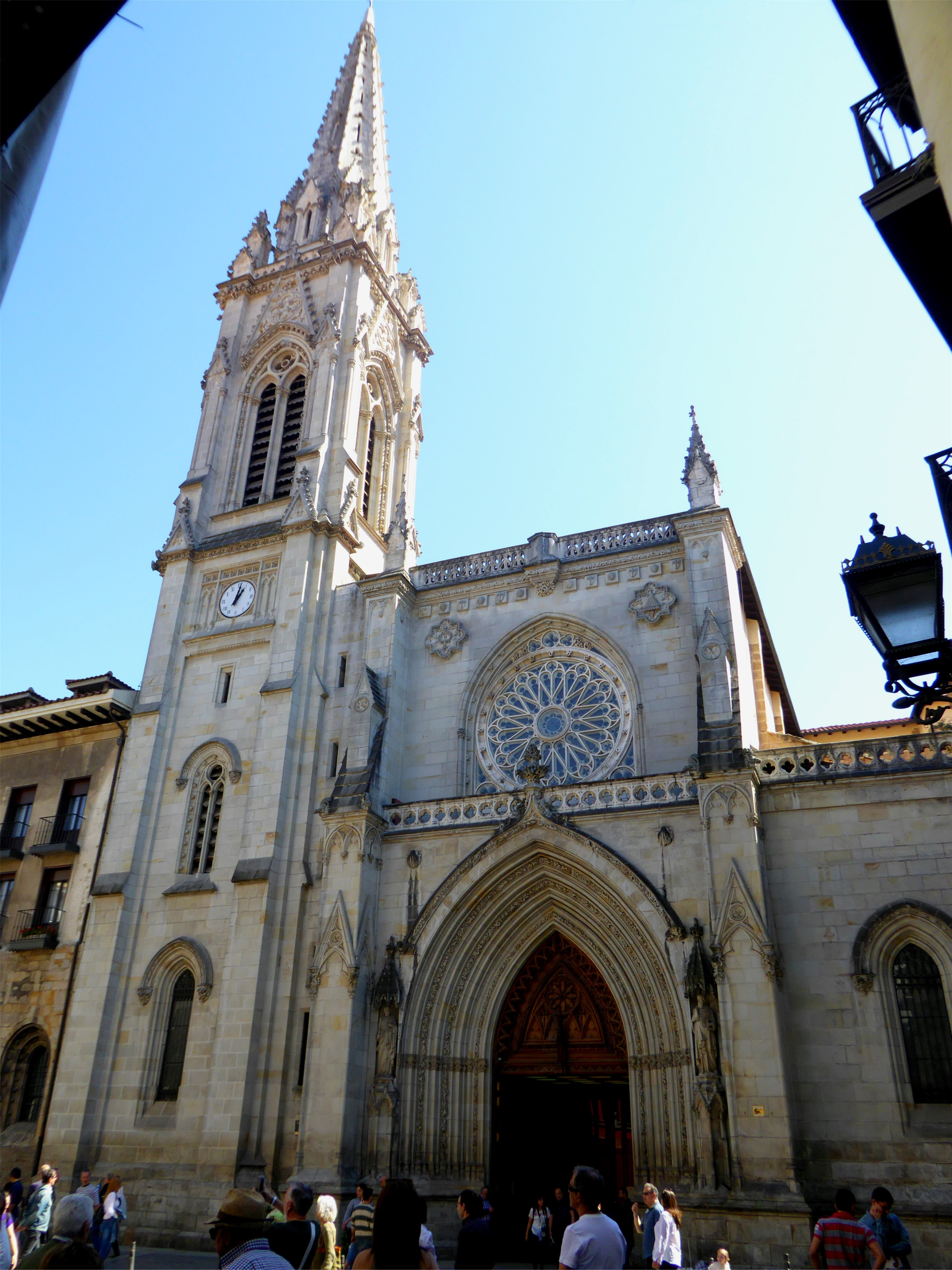
The Gothic St. James Cathedral

In its beginnings, Bilbao only had three streets (Somera, Artecalle, and Tendería) surrounded by walls located where Ronda street now stands. Inside this enclosure, there was a small hermitage dedicated to the Apostle Saint James (the current St. James' Cathedral), which pilgrims visited on their way to Santiago de Compostela. In the fifteenth century, four more streets were built, forming the original Zazpikaleak or "Seven Streets". In 1571, after several floods and a major fire in 1569, the walls were demolished in order to allow the expansion of the town.

In 1861, engineer Amado Lázaro projected an ensanche inside the then-municipality of Abando with wide avenues and regular buildings, that took into account the hygienic ideas of the time. The project was mostly based on Barcelona's Eixample, designed by Ildefons Cerdà. However, the project was dropped by the Bilbao City Council after considering it "utopian and excessive" because of its high cost, though of great quality. Furthermore, Lázaro had calculated the demographic growth of the town was based on the previous three centuries, a provision that eventually would not conform to reality.

The next large urban change in Bilbao would come in 1876, when the capital annexed (in several stages) the neighbouring municipality of Abando. The new ensanche project was planned by a team made of architect Severino de Achúcarro and engineers Pablo de Alzola (elected Mayor that same year), and Ernesto de Hoffmeyer. Unlike Lázaro's, this project was significantly smaller, compassing 1.58 km^{2} (0.61 sq mi) against the original 2.54 km^{2} (0.98 sq mi). It also featured a not so strict grid pattern, a park to separate the industrial and residential areas and the Gran Vía de Don Diego López de Haro, the main thoroughfare, where many relevant buildings were located, such as the Biscay provincial government hall or the BBVA Tower. By the end of the 1890s, this widening was half completed and already filled, so a new extension was planned by Federico Ugalde.

By 1925, the municipalities of Deusto and Begoña, as well as part of Erandio were annexed, and in 1940, the remaining part of Erandio became part of Bilbao. The last annexation took place in 1966, with the municipalities of Loiu, Sondika, Derio, and Zamudio. This made Bilbao larger than ever, with 107 km^{2} (41 sq mi). However, all these municipalities, with the exception of Deusto and Begoña regained their independence on 1 January 1983.

On 18 May 2010, the government of Singapore awarded Bilbao the Lee Kuan Yew World City Prize, at the World Cities Summit 2010. It is considered the Pritzker of urbanism.

=== Architecture ===
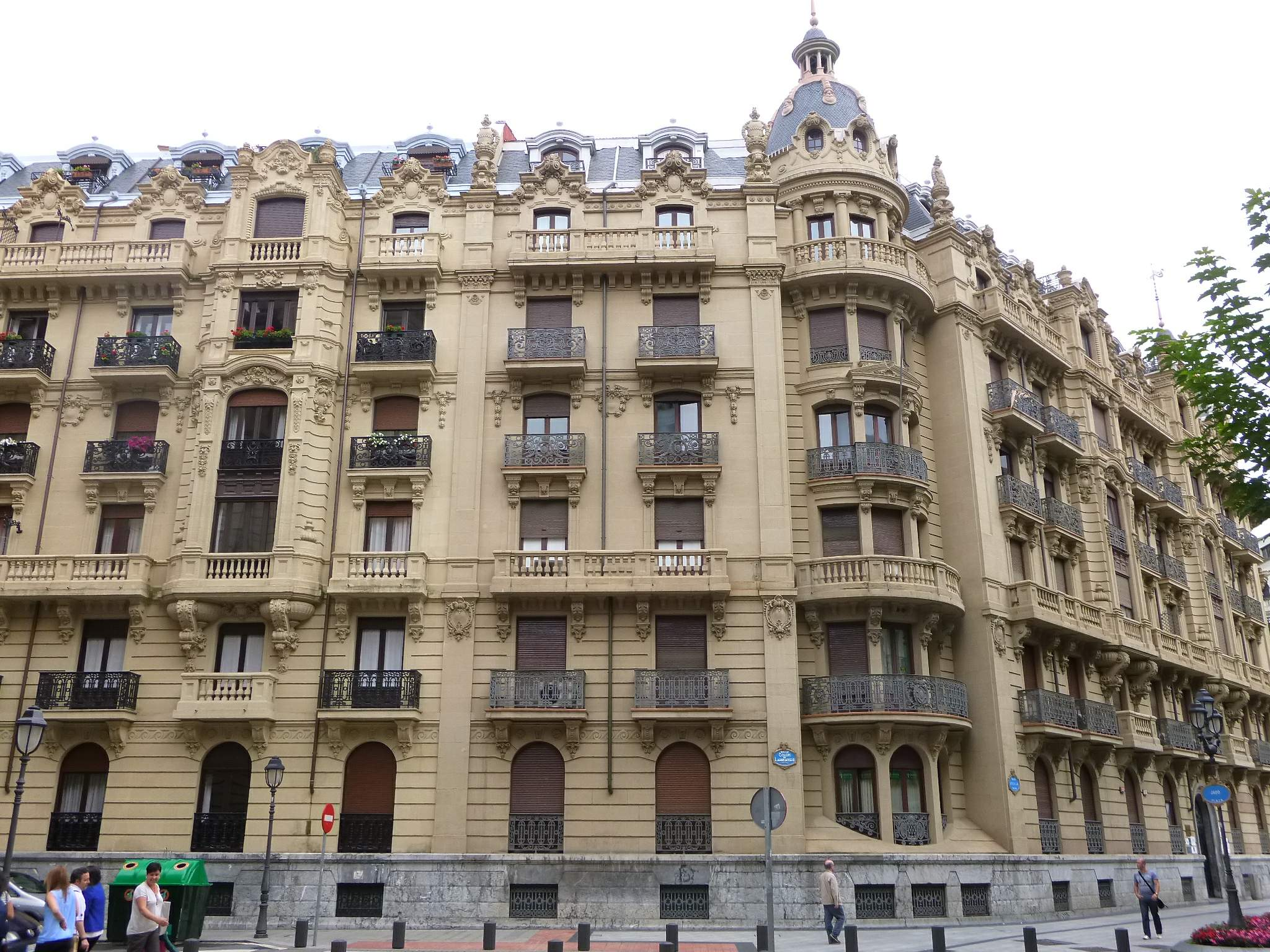
Typical late-19th-century architecture of Bilbao

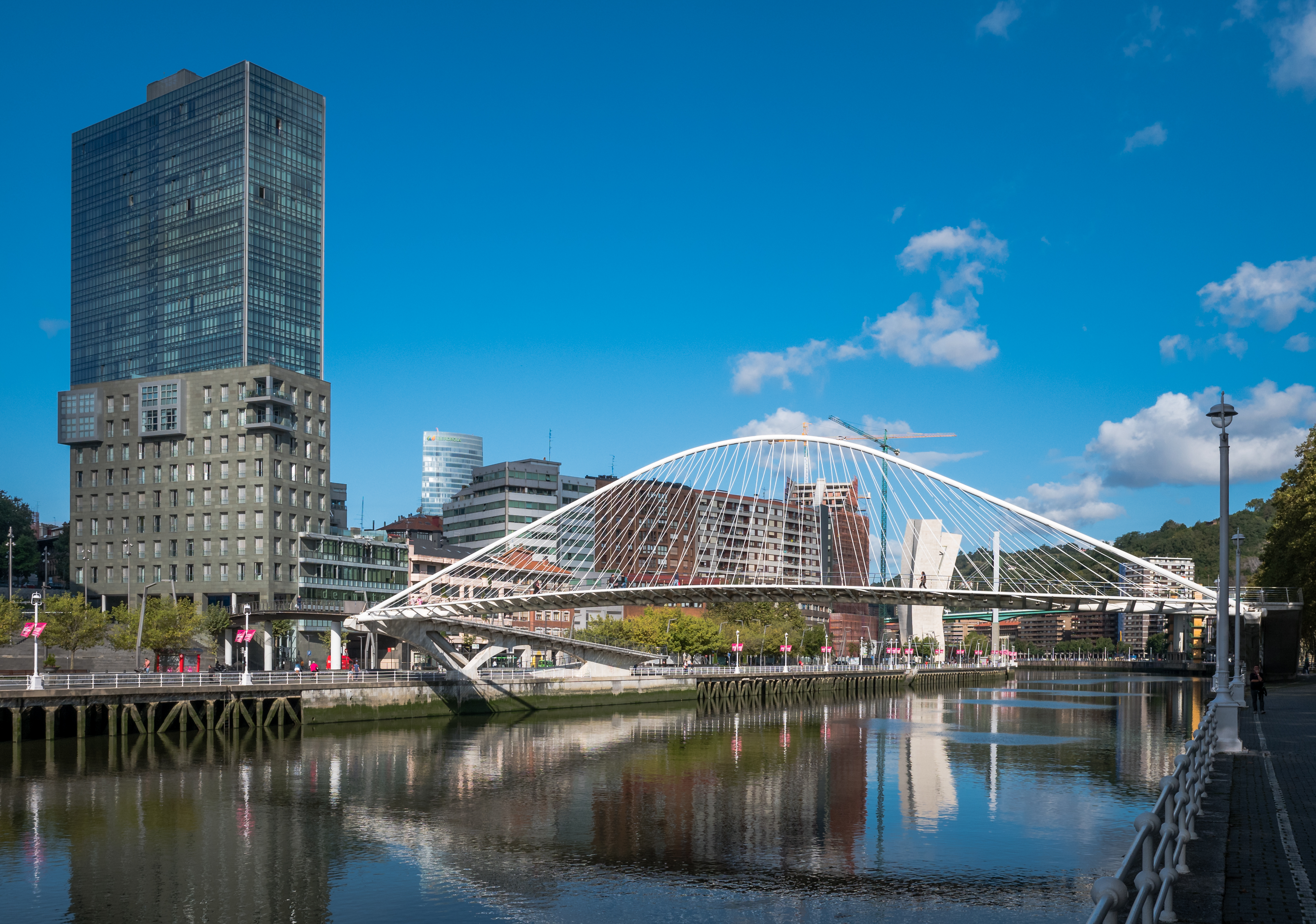
Isozaki Atea and the Zubizuri footbridge, symbols of the city's transformation

Bilbao's built environment includes a range of architectural styles, among them Gothic, Art Deco, Art Nouveau, Neo-Gothic and contemporary architecture. The Old Town contains many of the city's oldest buildings, including St. James' Cathedral and the Church of San Antón, which appears on the borough's coat of arms. Much of the Old Town functions as a pedestrian zone during the day. Nearby stands the Basilica of Begoña, one of Biscay's principal religious buildings, dedicated to the province's patron saint, Our Lady of Begoña.

Seventeen bridges cross the estuary within the city's boundaries. Among them are the Zubizuri, Basque for "white bridge", a pedestrian footbridge designed by Santiago Calatrava and opened in 1997, and the Princes of Spain Bridge, commonly known as La Salve, a suspension bridge opened in 1972 and redesigned by the French conceptual artist Daniel Buren in 2007. The Deusto Bridge, a bascule bridge opened in 1936, was modelled on the Michigan Avenue Bridge in Chicago. Between 1890 and 1893, the Puente Colgante, the world's first transporter bridge, was built over the Nervion between Portugalete and Getxo by Alberto Palacio together with his brother Silvestre.

Since the deindustrialisation process that began in the 1990s, many former industrial areas have been converted into public and private spaces designed by internationally known architects and artists. The main example is the Guggenheim Museum Bilbao, located on the site of former docks and a timber warehouse. Designed by Frank Gehry and inaugurated in October 1997, the building has been described by architecture specialists as one of the most significant structures of the previous three decades and as a major work of contemporary architecture. The museum houses part of the Solomon R. Guggenheim Foundation's modern art collection.

Another redevelopment project is the Azkuna Zentroa, a former wine warehouse built in 1909 and redesigned in 2010 by French designer Philippe Starck as a multi-purpose cultural and leisure venue. It includes a cinema multiplex, a fitness centre, a library and a restaurant, among other spaces.

The Abandoibarra area has also been extensively renewed. In addition to the Guggenheim Museum, it includes Arata Isozaki's tower complex, the Euskalduna Conference Centre and Concert Hall and the Iberdrola Tower, designed by Argentine architect César Pelli. Completed in 2011, the tower is 165 metres (541 ft) high and became the tallest skyscraper in the Basque Country.

Zorrozaurre is another major redevelopment area, following a 2007 master plan by Iraqi architect Zaha Hadid. The former peninsula was converted into a 500,000 m^{2} (5,400,000 sq ft) island and planned to include residential and commercial buildings, as well as the new BBK headquarters.

=== Parks and gardens ===
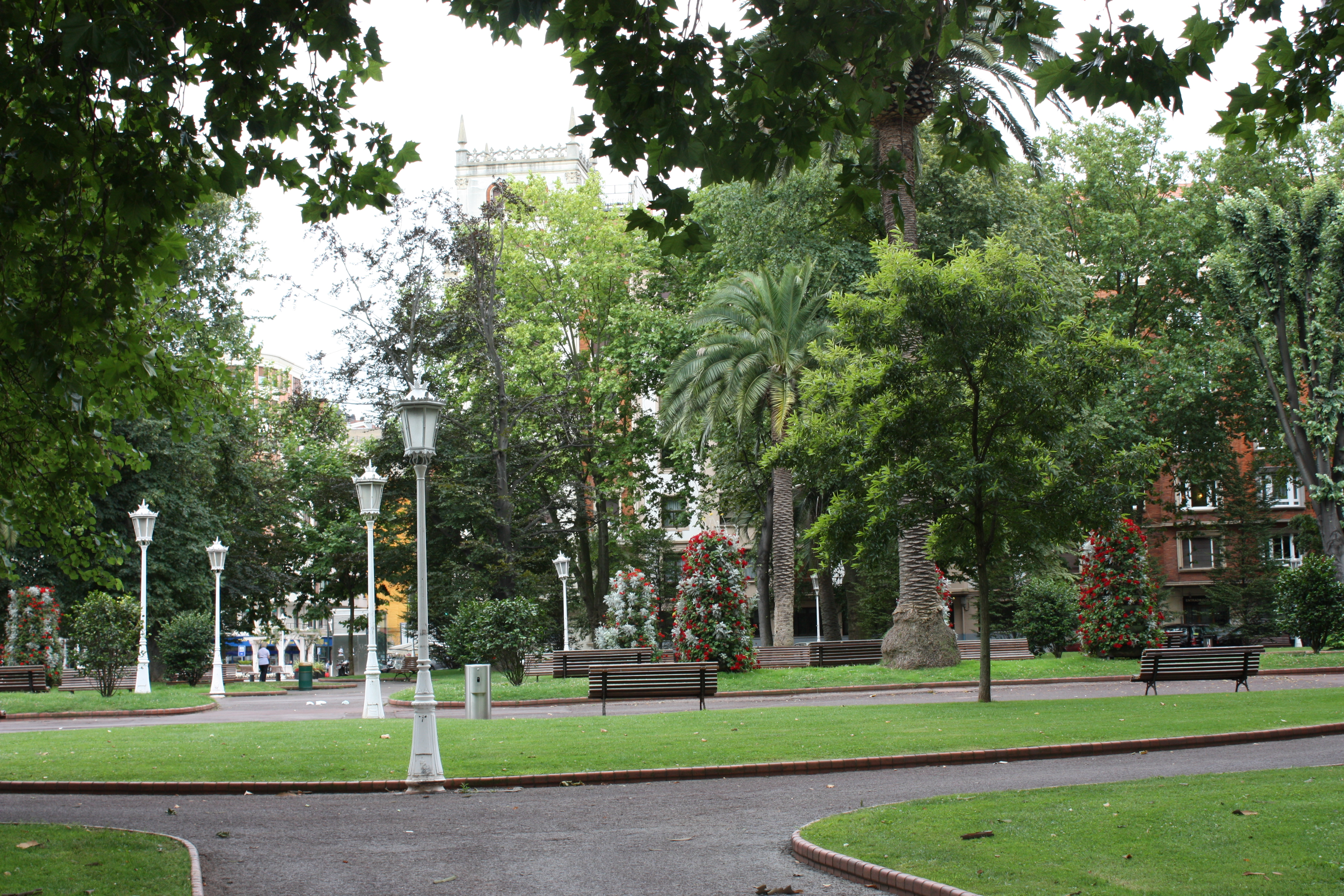
Doña Casilda Iturrizar Park

As of 2010, Bilbao has 18 public parks inside its limits, totalling 200 ha (490 acres) of green spaces. Furthermore its green belt has a total area of 1,025 ha (2,530 acres), of which 119 ha (290 acres) are urbanized. The largest parks are Mount Cobetas, of 18.5 ha (46 acres), and Larreagaburu, of 12 ha (30 acres), both located on the outskirts.

The Doña Casilda Iturrizar Park is located in the district of Abando, near the town centre and covers an area of 8.5 ha (21 acres). It is named after a local benefactress who donated the grounds to the borough. It is an English-style garden designed by Ricardo Bastida and opened to the public in 1907. It features a dancing water fountain surrounded by a pergola, and a pond with many species of ducks, geese and swans, which gives the park the alternate name of "Ducks' Park", as known locally. In recent years, it was expanded to be connected with the Abandoibarra area. In Ibaiondo, the Etxeberria Park was built in the 1980s in the place where a steel mill previously stood. The original chimney was maintained as a homage of its industrial past. It covers an area of 18.9 ha (47 acres), on a sloped terrain that overlooks the Old Town. Other relevant public spaces inside the city include the Europa Park, the Miribilla Park, or the Memorial Walkway, a 3 km (1.9 mi) long walkway, with 12 m (39 ft) high lamps, located in the left bank of the estuary and that connects the main sights.

Mount Artxanda is easily accessible from the town centre by a funicular. There is a recreational area at the summit, with restaurants, a sports complex and a balcony with panoramic views. In the south, Mount Pagasarri receives hundreds of hikers every weekend since the 1870s, who seek its natural wonders. Its environment is officially protected since 2007.

== Culture ==
Bilbao was appointed a "City of Design" by UNESCO in 2014 and has been part of the Creative Cities Network since then.

=== Theatres ===
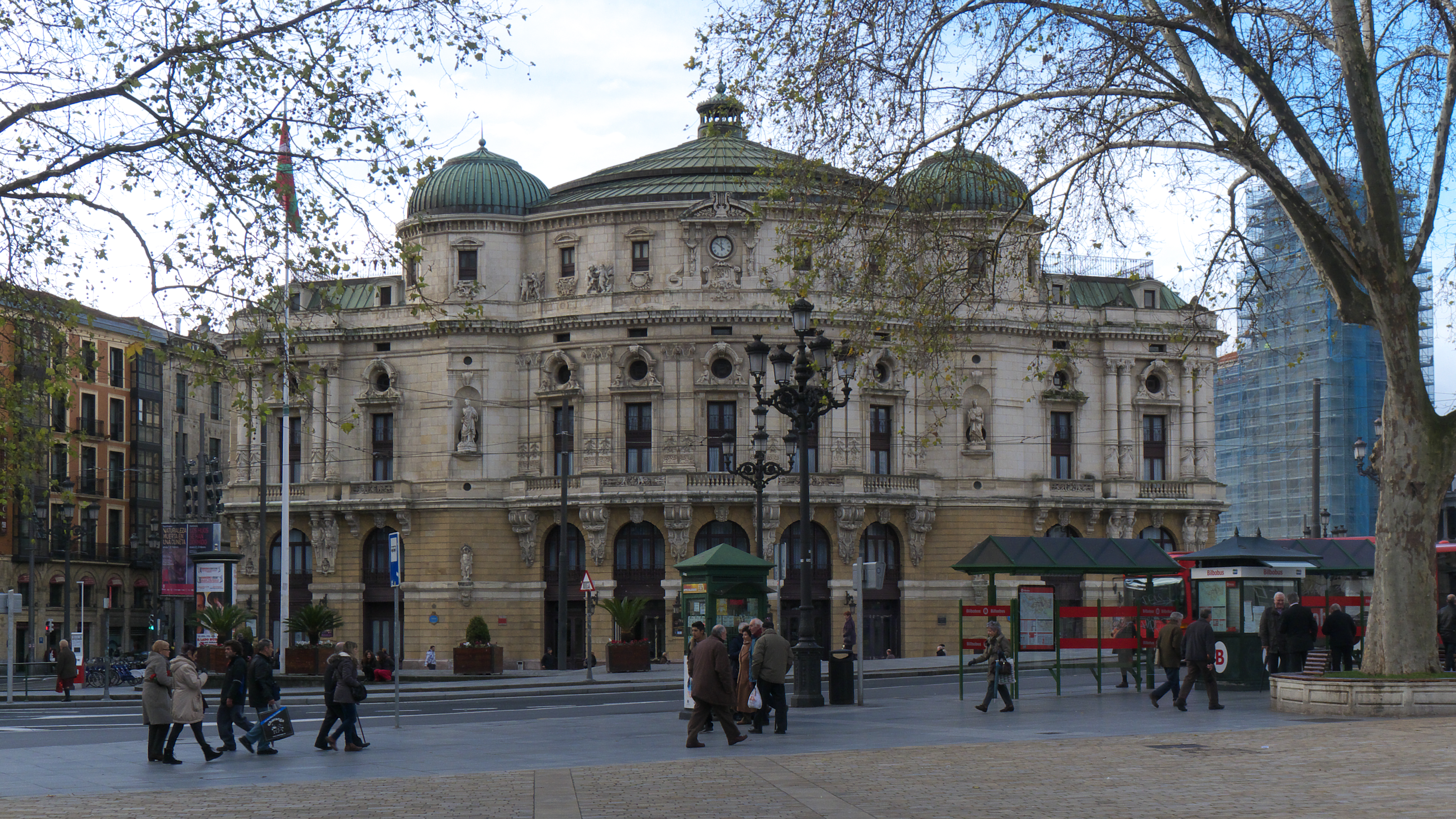
The Arriaga Theatre, located by the river in the Old Town

The main hall of the city is the Arriaga Theatre, reopened in 1985 as a municipal venue with a varied repertoire that includes dancing, opera, live music and theatre. Also very active are the Campos Elíseos Theatre and the Euskalduna Concert Hall. Other important venues include La Fundición, dedicated to contemporary dances and theatre; the Pabellón 6, the Sala BBK and the Azkuna Zentroa.

=== Museums ===
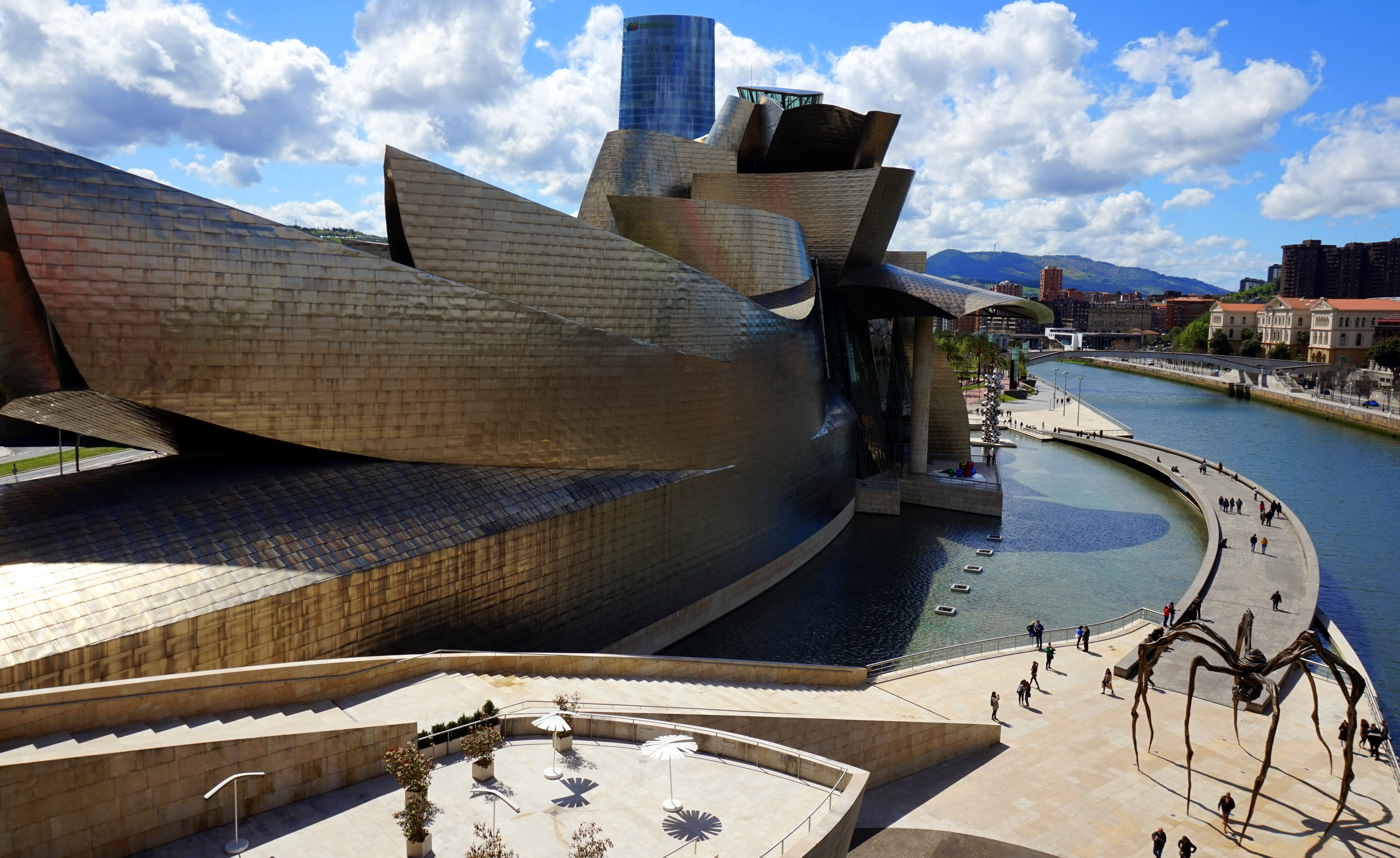
The Guggenheim Museum Bilbao

Bilbao has more than a dozen museums covering a range of fields including art, science, and sport, which have played a central role in Bilbao being named one of the most creative cities in the world.

The Guggenheim Museum Bilbao, part of the Solomon R. Guggenheim Foundation, was inaugurated on 19 October 1997 and is work of the Canadian architect Frank Gehry. The museum's permanent collection is centred in the visual arts of the second half of the 20th century and the present, with relevant artworks from Richard Serra and Jeff Koons, although including as well temporary exhibitions with a more varied nature, like Russian art or engravings from Albrecht Dürer.

Another important museum is the Bilbao Fine Arts Museum, first established in 1908 and housing a notable collection of Spanish and European work from the 12th century to present times. The collection from before the 20th century is centred mainly around Spanish and Flemish artists such as El Greco, Francisco de Zurbarán, Bartolomé Esteban Murillo, Francisco Goya and Anthony van Dyck. The museum also holds one of the best collections of Basque art, with works from the 19th century to present times. It has an eye-catching collection of avant-garde art, from the Post-Impressionism of Paul Gauguin to pop art and the expressionism of Francis Bacon.

The Basque Museum showcases Basque archaeology and ethnography, and holds frequent exhibitions on Basque history. The museum building itself is part of the heritage listing Conjunto histórico. The city also has several specialised museums, like the Maritime Museum Estuary of Bilbao (Bilboko Itsasadarra Itsas Museoa), located next to the Estuary of Bilbao, which holds ships and other collection related to the region's fishing and shipbuilding culture, being particularly relevant the Carola crane, last remaining element of the Euskalduna shipyard that existed where the museum now stands.

Other relevant museums are the Biscayan Archeological Museum (Arkeologi Museoa) which holds important collections related to the region's prehistory, and the Diocesan Museum of Religious Art (Eleiz Museoa), both located in the Casco Viejo quarter.

=== Music ===
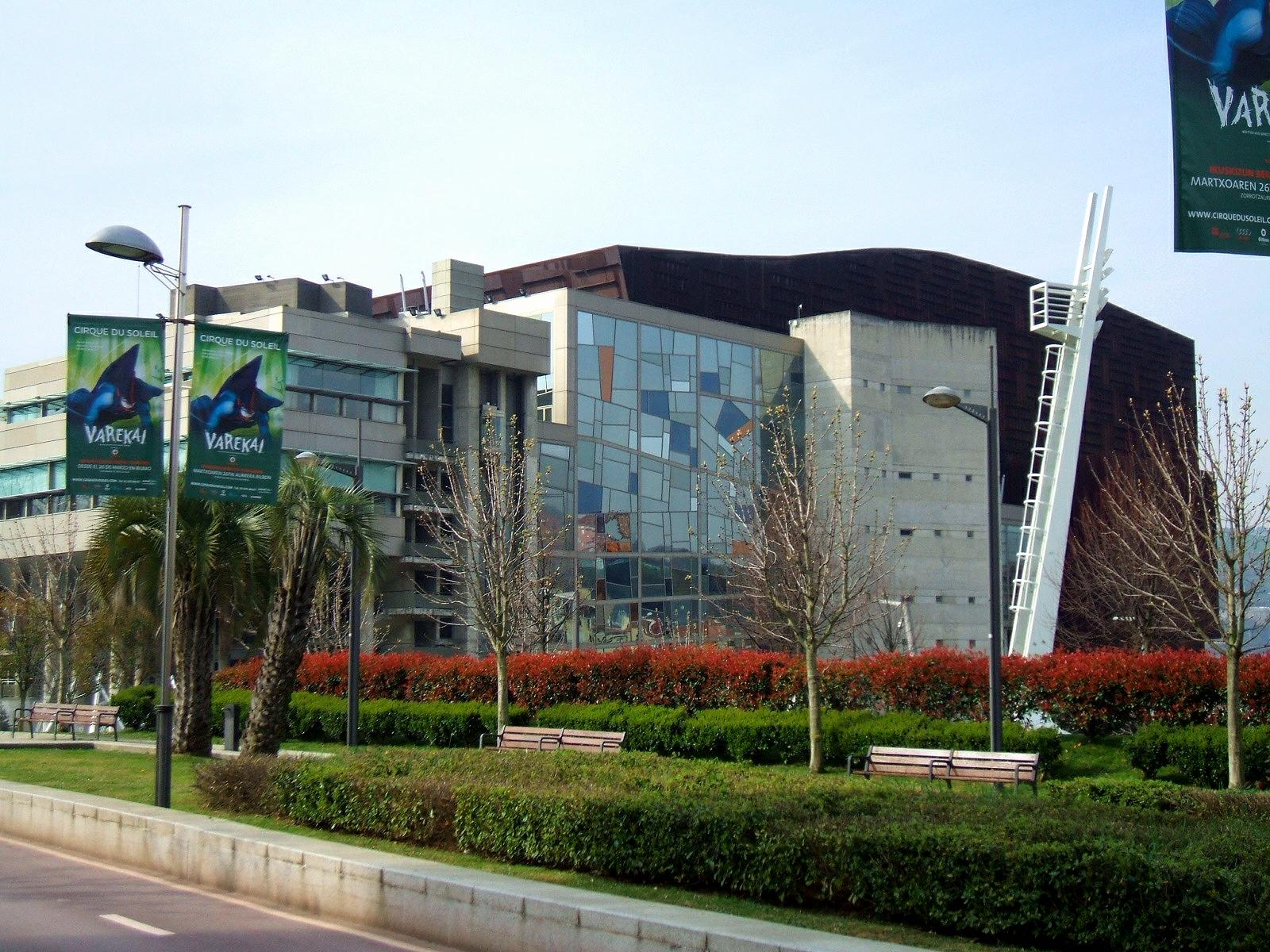
The Euskalduna Concert Hall

The Euskalduna Concert Hall is home to frequent musical performances and it is home of the Bilbao Symphony Orchestra (Bilbao Orkestra Sinfonikoa) and the opera season programmed by the ABAO (Bilbao Association of Friends of the Opera). The Arriaga Theatre is frequently the host of numerous musical events, other notable stages include the Philharmonic Society of Bilbao (chamber music) and Bilborock (pop and rock music). The city hosts many different musical festivities, often funded by the city hall. Due to its scope, it is especially relevant the Bilbao BBK Live festival, which has been celebrated every year since 2006 and focuses on Basque, Spanish and international pop and rock music. Since the opening of the new San Mamés Stadium in 2013, it has been often used as an open-air concert venue, the first ever concert being one from the American band Guns N' Roses in 2017. Other relevant music festivals include the Bilbao Distrito Jazz and the Bilbao Ars Sacrum, the latter dedicated to religious music.

Bilbao is the birthplace of famous composer Juan Crisóstomo Arriaga, who lived his formative years in the city before moving to Paris at age 15. Also native from Bilbao were the soprano singer Josefa Cruz de Gassier and Natividad Álvarez, nicknamed Nati, la bilbainita (Spanish for "Nati, the little one from Bilbao") a dancer and castanets player who achieved national fame in the early 20th century. Also relevant is the Bilbao Choir Society (Bilboko Koral Elkartea), established in 1866. Important musical bands coming from the city include rock band Fito & Fitipaldis, Basque folk band Oskorri and folk-pop band Mocedades.

Bilbao hosted the 2018 MTV Europe Music Awards.

=== Festivals and events ===
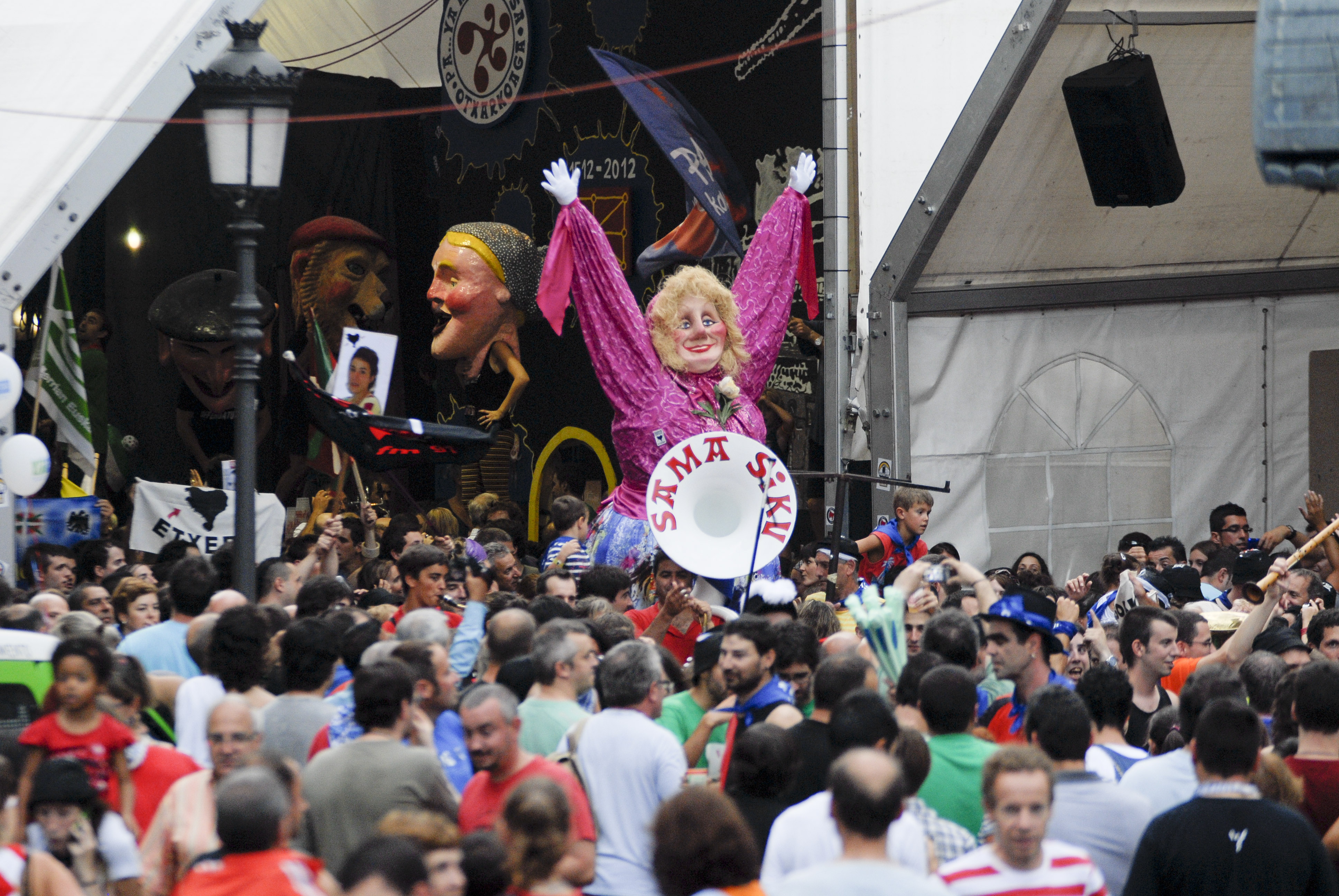
Marijaia and the konpartsak during the Aste Nagusia, with Gigantes y cabezudos in the background

Bilbao hosts several regular festivals and events. The most relevant is the Big Week of the city (Aste Nagusia), celebrated annually since 1978 and lasting nine days. It is the city's main festival, attracting over 1,500,000 people every year. The festivities begin on the first Saturday before 22 August, and during those nine days the city hall organises a series of cultural events of diverse kind, including concerts, stage plays, Basque rural sports and bullfighting, as well as nightly firework displays. The festivities begin with the chupinazo or txupinazo, which is the launch of a small rocket, and the reading of a proclamation by the festivities' herald. The central point of the festivities is the place around the txosnas, where the different konpartsak are reunited, organised by neighbourhood associations as well as cultural, social and political groups. The symbol of the festivities is Marijaia, a large doll which is burned during the last day of celebrations.

Beyond the main festivities of the Aste Nagusia, the city also celebrates some minor festivities, many of them religious in nature, such as Saint Agatha on 5 February, the celebrations of Our Lady of Begoña on 11 October, the Day of Thomas the Apostle on 21 December and the Christmas festivities, centred around the figure of Olentzero. There are also festivities in the different neighbourhoods and districts which are celebrated locally, such as the Fiestas del Carmen in Santutxu and Indautxu, Fiestas Santiago in Bilbao la Vieja, Fiestas San Ignacio in San Inazio and Fiestas San Roque in Arxtanda and Larraskitu.

The city also hosts the International Festival of Documentary and Short Film under the commercial name of Zinebi. It was first held in 1959 under the name International Festival of Ibero-American and Filipino Documentary Film of Bilbao, with the goal of being complementary to the San Sebastián International Film Festival. Since 1981 it is organised by the city hall and takes place in the Arriaga Theatre. Bilbao is also the host of the SAIL in Festival, a yearly event centred exclusively around sailing, which brings together international representatives of this sport.

=== Cuisine ===
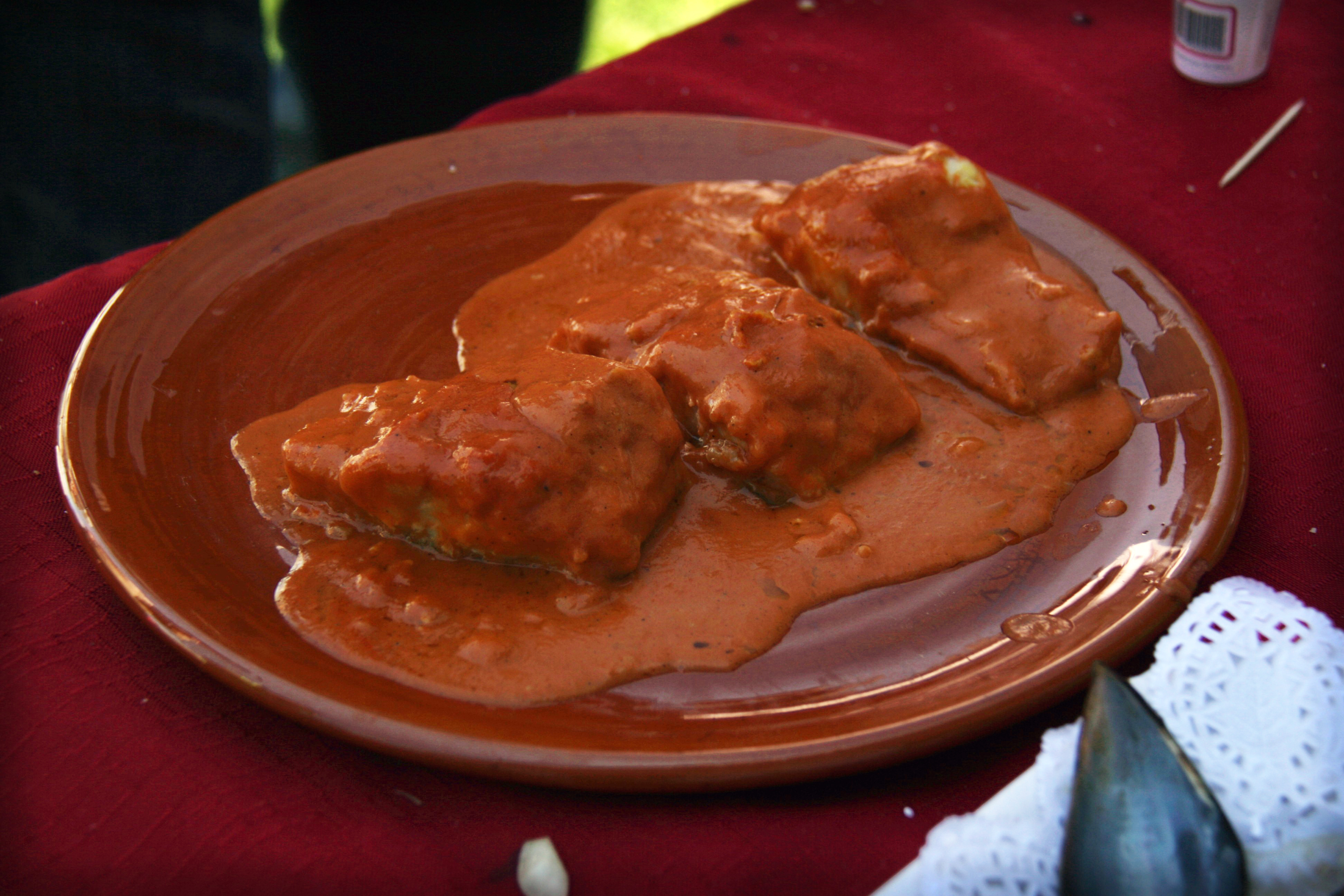
Biscayan-style cod

Traditional Bilbao dishes are centred around products from the sea and the estuary, such as eels and cod. For the most part Bilbao shares its original gastronomy with that of the province of Biscay, including dishes such as bacalao al pil pil (cod fish cooked with olive oil, garlic and guindilla peppers), bacalao a la vizcaína (salted cod with Biscayan sauce, mostly made of choricero peppers and onions), merluza en salsa verde (hake fish with green sauce), chipirones en su tinta (squid served with its own ink), morros a la vizcaína (beef snouts with Biscayan sauce), revuelto de perretxikos (scrambled eggs with mushrooms) and desserts such as canutillos de Bilbao (puff pastries filled with custard or chocolate), Pantxineta (puff pastries filled with custard and almonds), rice cakes and bollos de mantequilla (butter buns).

Bilbao, as other Basque cities, is known for a variety of appetizers and snacks, being prominent among them the pintxos, which are typically eaten in bars and that consist of small slices of bread on top of which is placed an ingredient or mixture of ingredients, generally of many different types and usually including elements typical of Basque cuisine. Other snacks include rabas (fried or battered calamari rings, usually served with lemon slices), Spanish omelette (omelette made with eggs and potatoes, sometimes including onions and peppers), txampis (stuffed mushrooms), triángulos (Bilbao-style sandwiches), gildas (one or more olives, a guindilla pepper and an anchovy joined together with a toothpick).

As for beverages, typical from the region is the txakoli, a white wine usually drunk as an apéritif. Biscayan txakoli (Bizkaiko Txakolina) is a protected Denominación de origen for the white wine produced in the province of Biscay and it is usually served in Bilbao. Also typical are cider, patxaran (sloe-flavoured liqueur) and Rioja wine.

There are many restaurants and bars who serve these dishes and beverages, especially around the Casco Viejo quarter. Txokos are also a very popular institution in Bilbao, as in other Basque cities and towns. Bilbao, and the province of Biscay as a whole, is one of the spanish cities with a greater number of recognized restaurants by the gastronomic guides, among them several Michelin-starred restaurants.

=== Language ===
Spanish is the most used language of the city, followed by Basque, which is local to the region. The presence of Basque in the city is less prominent than in other municipalities of the region, such as Bermeo or Lekeitio. In 1986, the bilingual Basque-speaking population represented about 28% of the total. However, the number of Basque speakers has experienced a continuous increase since, reaching a figure of 37% in 2001. More than half of the Basque speakers were younger than 30 and lived in the districts of Deusto, Begoña and Abando.

According to the data from the 2016 census, the population older than 2 years old registered in the municipality of Bilbao who speaks Basque fluently represents 29% of the total population, while those who can speak it with difficulty represent around 19.95% of the total. Finally, those who cannot speak or understand the language represent the remaining 51.06% of the census.

Evolution of the Basque-speaking population
Group	1981	1986	1991	1996	2001	2006	2011	2016
Bilinguals: Able to understand and speak both Basque and Spanish	23,430	33,181	34,429	49,519	51,302	80,903	78,727	97,287
Passive bilinguals: Able to understand Basque but cannot speak it, while able to understand and speak Spanish	47,288	63,598	65,925	66,797	71,189	63,404	96,774	67,004
Spanish monolinguals: Unable to understand or speak Basque, only Spanish	296,703	266,045	255,210	229,336	212,485	190,483	166,869	171,441
Population	367,421	362,824	355,564	345,652	334,976	334,790	342,370	335,732

== Transport ==
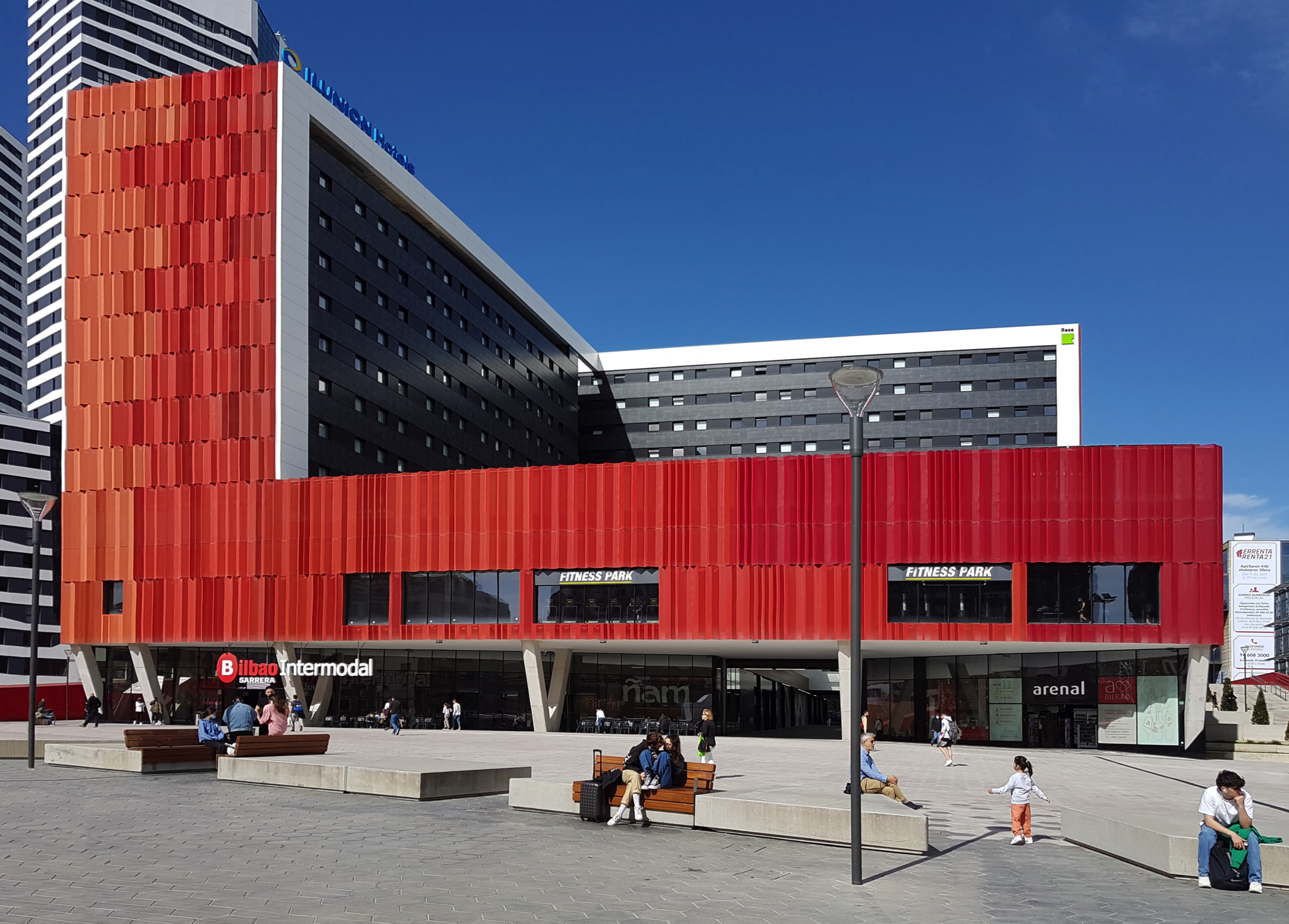
Bilbao Intermodal is the main bus station of Bilbao.

=== Roads and highways ===
Bilbao is a relevant transport hub for northern Spain. Bilbao is connected to three major motorways and a series of minor roads of national and provincial level. The city lies on two international roads, the European route E70 that follows the coast of the Bay of Biscay and the cities of Santander and Gijón to the west and with Eibar, San Sebastián and Bordeaux to the east. The European route E80 connects the city with inner Spain to the south, including Burgos and Salamanca and continuing to Lisbon, and Toulouse to the north. The AP-68 motorway (European road E-804) starts in the city, joining with Vitoria-Gasteiz, Logroño and ending in Zaragoza.

The city is connected with the regions of Cantabria, Asturias and Galicia via the A-8 motorway and with Durango, Eibar, San Sebastián and the French border via the AP-8 motorway, which is a toll road. The AP-68 toll motorway to the south is the main road connecting Bilbao with southern Spain and the Mediterranean coast, connecting in Miranda de Ebro with the A-1 to Madrid and in Zaragoza with the AP-2 to Barcelona.

Minor roads passing through Bilbao or starting in the city itself include the national road N-634 which connects San Sebastián with Santiago de Compostela and runs parallel to the A-8 and AP-8 motorways. The regional road BI-631 connects Bilbao with Bermeo, while the BI-626 joins the city with Balmaseda. The city is circled by the BI-625 and N-637 roads, which form a half-ring to the east, and the N-634 and A-8 to the west.

The city's main arteries the Gran Vía de Don Diego López de Haro, which crosses the financial and business district of Abando and connecting it with the Casco Viejo to the east and the San Mamés area to the west. The Sabino Arana Avenue and Juan Antonio Zunzunegui Avenue provide a direct route between the central districts and the motorways while Autonomía Street joins the southern districts on an east-west direction. The city has 14 bridges connecting opposite sides of the Estuary of Bilbao and the Kadagua river, including the La Salve and Euskalduna bridges, as well a series of tunnels under the Mount Artxanda.

=== Airports ===
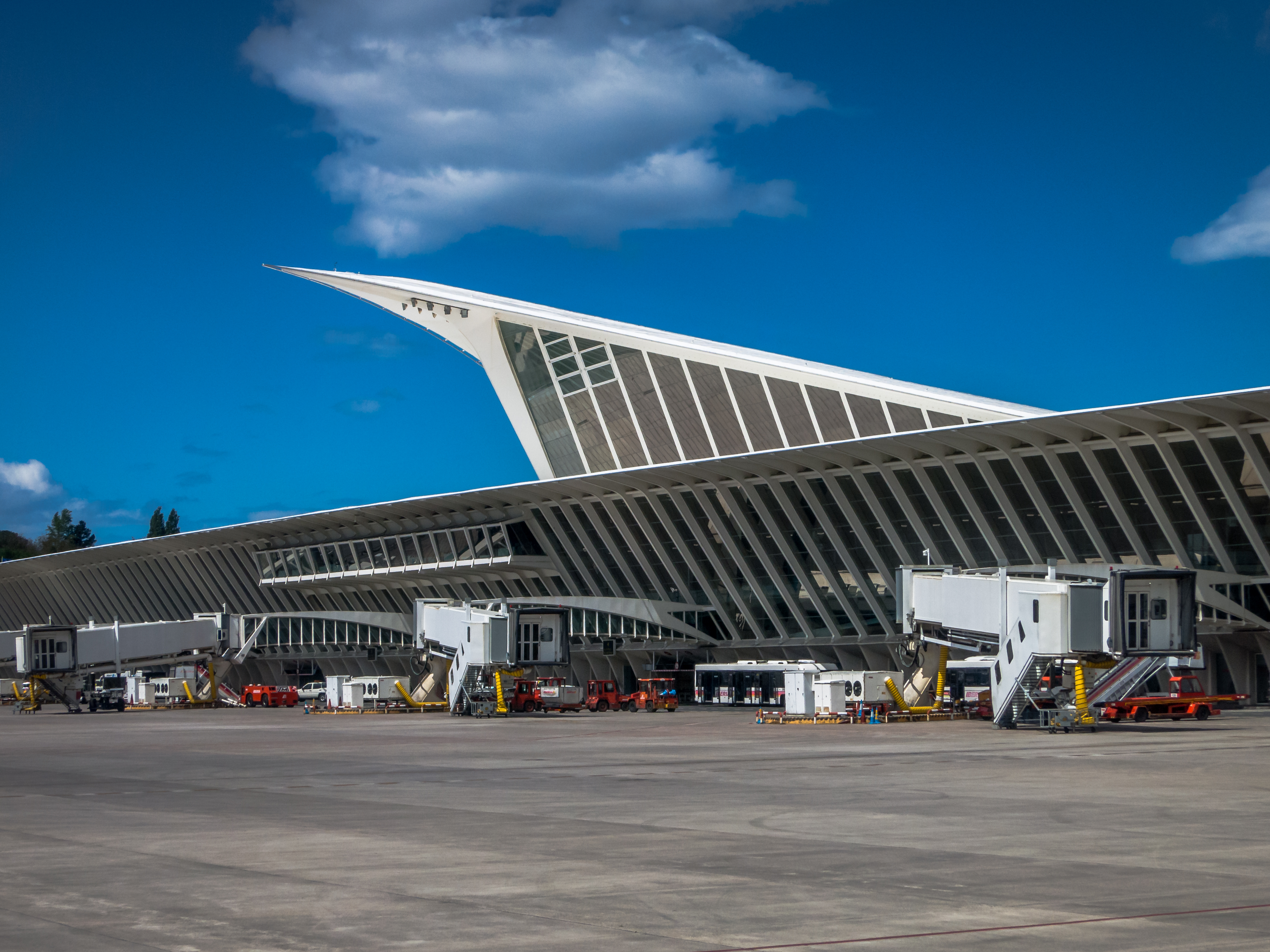
Bilbao Airport

Bilbao is served by the Bilbao Airport (BIO), the busiest terminal in the Basque Country and in the entire Northern coast, with more than 5.4 million passengers in 2018. It is located 12 km (7.46 mi) north of the borough, between the municipalities of Loiu and Sondika. 20 airlines operate in the terminal, including Iberia, Lufthansa, and TAP Portugal. Top destinations include London, Frankfurt, Munich, Madrid, Barcelona, Málaga, Paris, Brussels, and Amsterdam. It opened to the public in September 1948, with a regular flight to Madrid. On 19 November 2000, a new terminal building was opened, designed by Valencian architect Santiago Calatrava. In February 2009, a project was approved to expand the current building to double its capacity. Although originally expected to be completed by 2014, the 2008 financial crisis and the decrease of passenger traffic delayed it to at least 2019. No work has begun as of 2018.

Some low-cost airlines, such as Ryanair, also use the Vitoria Airport (VIT) located in Foronda located 59 km (37 mi) south of the city.

=== Railways ===
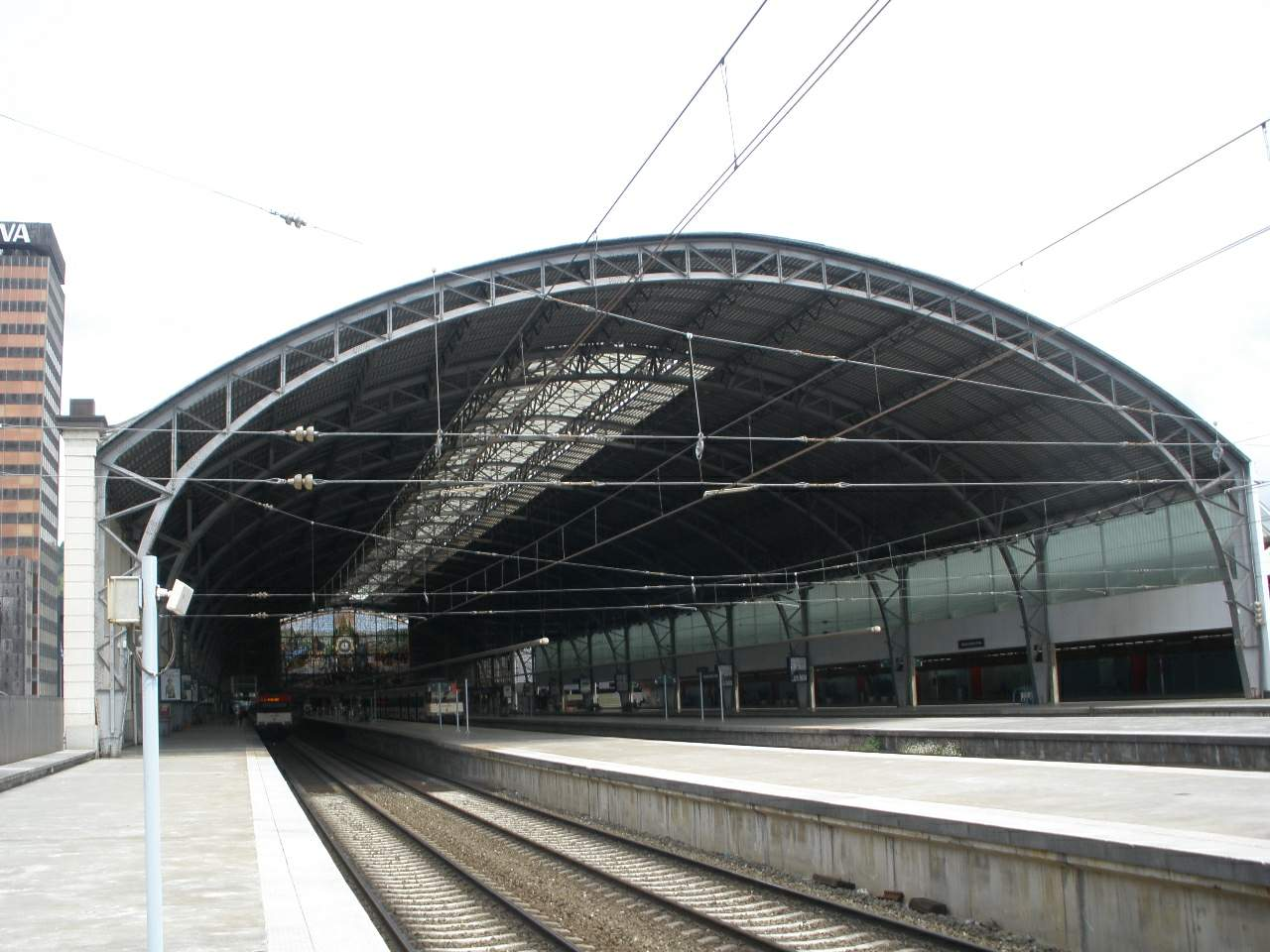
Bilbao-Abando railway station

Long-distance rail lines connect Bilbao with Madrid, Barcelona and other destinations in northern Spain. The city has three main railway stations: the Bilbao-Abando and Bilbao-Concordia railway stations are owned by Adif and operated by the Spanish railways Renfe, whereas the Zazpikaleak/Casco Viejo station is owned by the Basque railway network ETS and operated by Euskotren and Metro Bilbao, S.A., serving short-distance local destinations.

The Bilbao-Abando station is the main railway station of the city, with Renfe running Iberian-gauge long-distance Alvia trains to Madrid and Barcelona, as well as Intercity services to Miranda de Ebro with connections possible to A Coruña and Hendaye. During the summer there are special trains to Málaga. The station will be connected to the Basque Y high-speed train network around 2038, allowing for high speed AVE trains to operate between the Basque capitals and also to Madrid and other Spanish cities in the future. The arrival of the new high speed services will involve the creation of a completely new underground station that will replace the current infrastructure and merge Abando and Concordia into one single station. The construction is expected to begin in 2027.

Bilbao-Concordia station is located in close vicinity to Bilbao-Abando, and hosts the narrow-gauge railway services ran by Renfe. Renfe runs some regional trains to the cities of Santander and León. Euskotren Trena runs regular commuter and regional services from the Zazpikaleak/Casco Viejo station to Durango, Bermeo, Eibar and San Sebastián.

=== Public transport ===
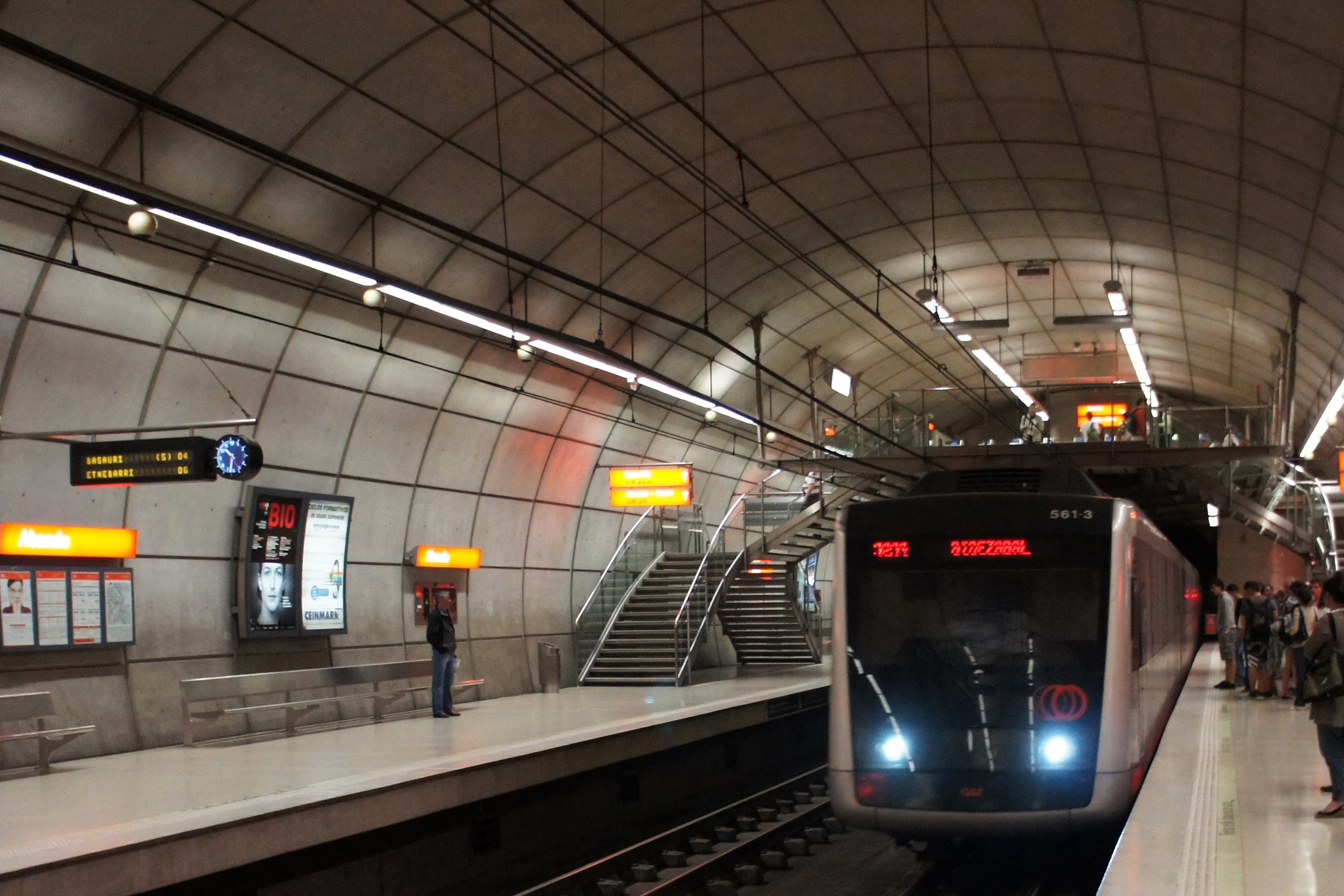
Abando station of the Bilbao Metro

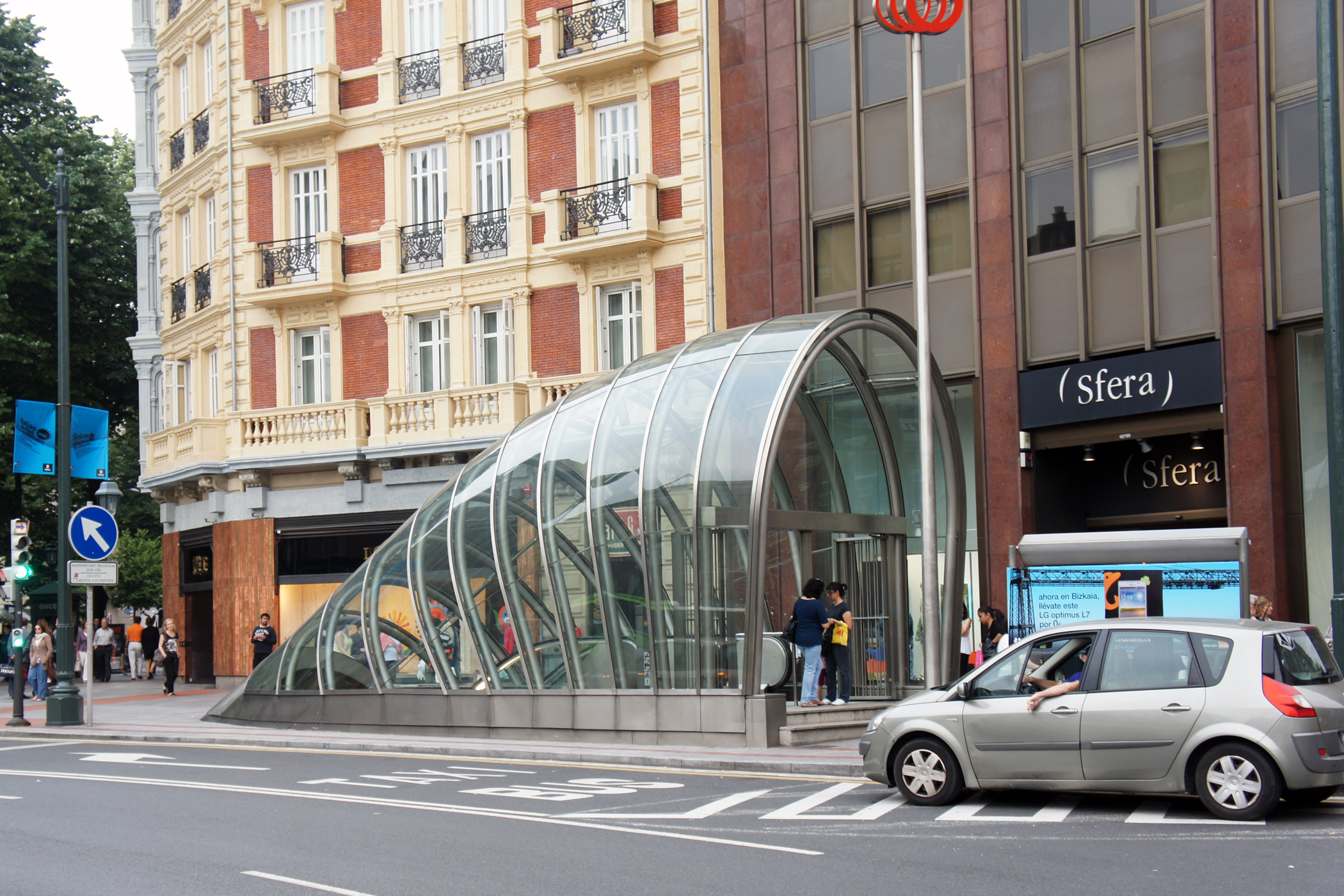
Metro entrance in the Plaza Elíptica, called "fosteritos" after designer Norman Foster

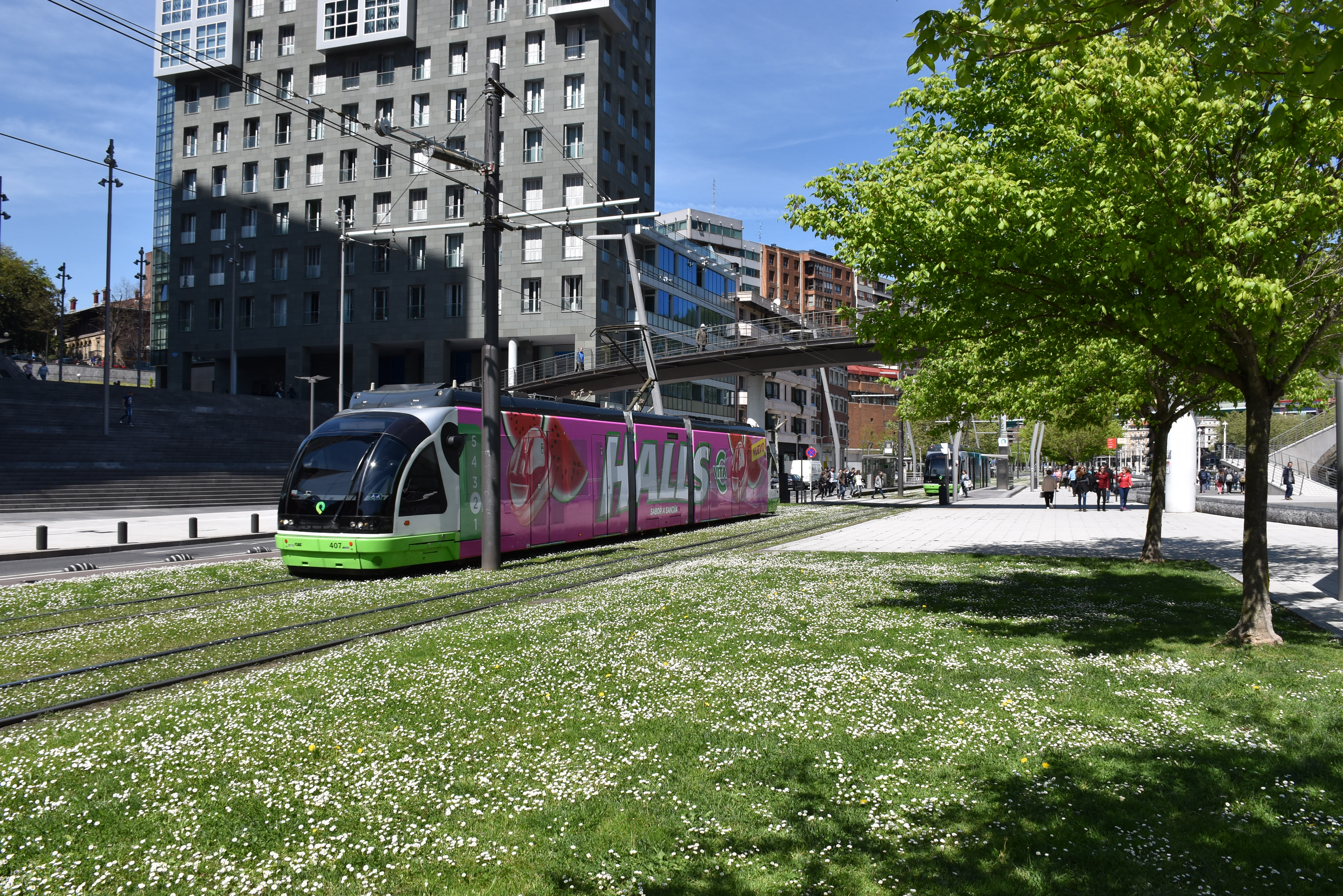
Tram unit leaving the Uribitare stop

Public transport by rail and bus is organised by the Bizkaiko Garraio Partzuergoa (Consortium of the Biscayan Transport). The consortium manages the Barik card, a form of electronic ticket valid across almost all public transport systems of the Bilbao metropolitan area and Biscay province, as well as some other selected services in other provinces of the Basque autonomous community.

The mass transit rail system is divided into different networks managed by separate operators. The Bilbao Metro, established in 1995, operates two underground lines with some overground sections (Line 1 and Line 2). These two lines connect the metropolitan area following the estuary on both sides, starting in Etxebarri in the south all the way to Plentzia and Santurtzi by the coast. Line 1 was built following largely the same route as the Bilbao-Las Arenas railway, which was still active by the time the Metro system opened in 1995 and has since been replaced by it. The metro system stations were designed by Norman Foster. Line 3 of the metro is operated by Euskotren Trena, which also operates the regional services to Durango and Eibar as well as a commuter rail line that connects the centre of Bilbao with Lezama and the Txorierri valley. This third line of metro was inaugurated on 8 April 2017 and is expected to be extended to the airport in the near future. Projects for a fourth and fifth line exist and are currently being studied.

Renfe operates four commuter-rail lines in a system separate from the metro under the Cercanías brand and are collectively known as Cercanías Bilbao. The four lines operated under the Cercanías name operate largely overground and travel larger distances than the metro system, reaching municipalities outside of the metropolitan area such as Muskiz or even outside of the Biscay province, like Amurrio. The four lines start in either the Bilbao-Abando or the Bilbao-Concordia railway stations.

Euskotren also operates a tramway line under the brand Euskotren Tranbia. The line follows the estuary of Bilbao across the central districts of the city, starting in the Bilbao-Atxuri Station and connecting important areas like the Guggenheim museum and the San Mamés football stadium. The original tram network started operations in 1876 and gradually expanded across the city to finally shut down in the 1960s due to being largely replaced by urban buses. The new tram system was opened on 18 December 2002, almost forty years after the closing of the original system.

The gaps in the railway service are covered by an extensive bus network. The urban bus system is operated under the brand Bilbobus and has 28 regular bus lines, 8 microbus lines and 8 night buses collectively known as Gautxori (night owl). The Bilbaobus network is limited to the city limits, and only a few lines extend beyond it. The BizkaiBus network fills this gap, with more than 100 lines, connecting the city with all other municipalities in the metropolitan area, as well as with most towns in Biscay and some in Álava.

A Brittany Ferries ferry service links Santurtzi, near Bilbao, to Portsmouth (UK). MV Cap Finistère ferry departs from the port of Bilbao, 15 km (9 mi) north west of the town centre. A service operated by Acciona Trasmediterranea served the same route from 16 May 2006 until April 2007. P&O Ferries operated this route until its withdrawal on 28 September 2010 with a ship called the Pride of Bilbao.

=== Public transportation statistics ===
The average amount of time people spend commuting with public transit in Bilbao, for example to and from work, on a weekday is 35 minutes. Three percent of public transit passengers ride for more than 2 hours every day. The average amount of time people wait at a stop or station for public transit is 7 minutes, while 4% of riders wait for over 20 minutes on average every day. The average distance people usually ride in a single trip with public transit is 6.9 km (4.3 mi), while 10% travel more than 12 km (7.5 mi) in a single direction.

== Infrastructure ==
=== Healthcare ===
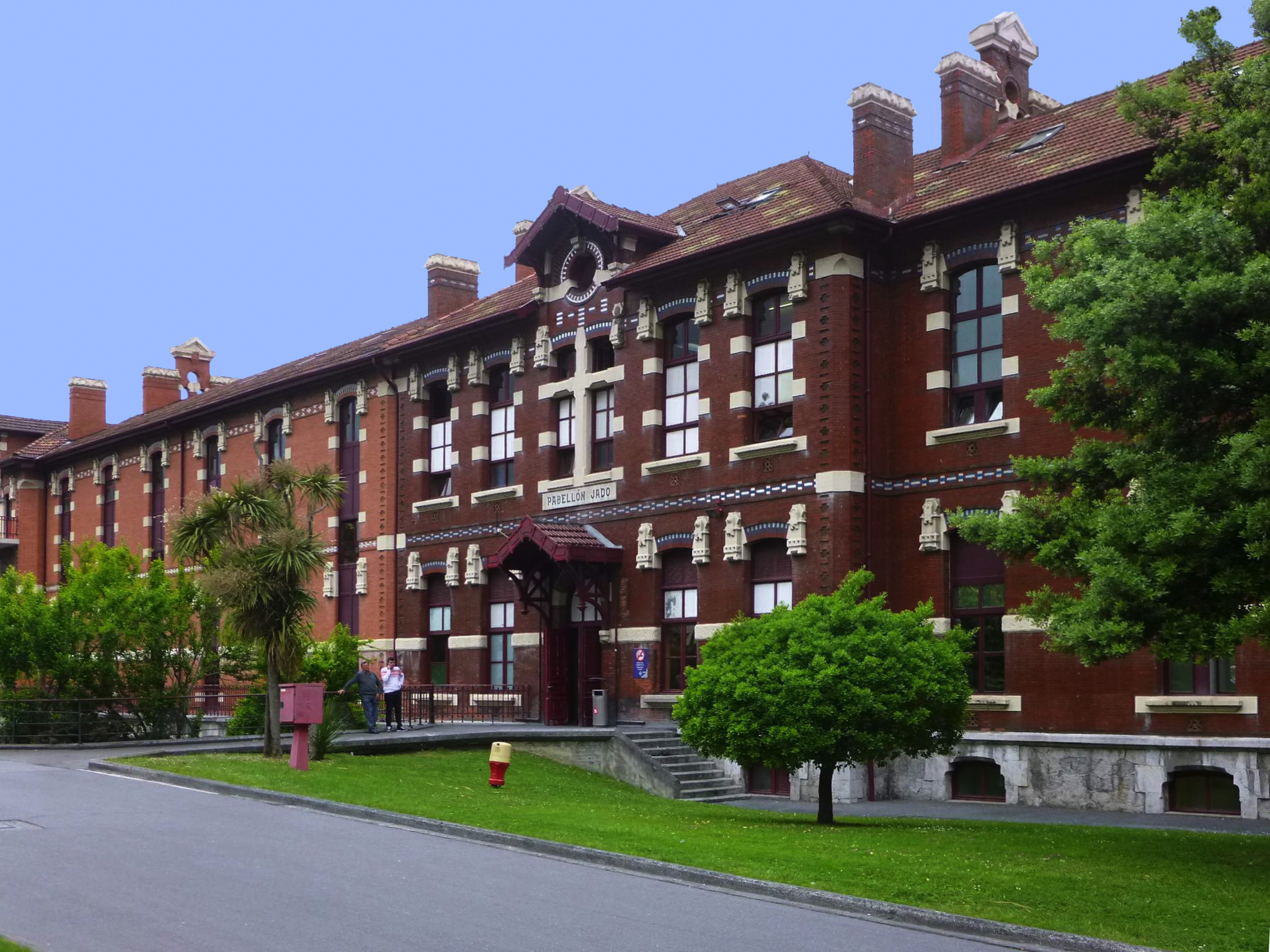
University Hospital of Basurto

The public healthcare system is served and managed by the Basque healthcare system (Osakidetza), which has a network of medical centres established across the city. The most relevant hospital of the city is the Basurto Hospital, located in the Basurto-Zorroza district. It was opened in 1908 after ten years of construction, and it was built due to the fast increase of population in the late 19th century. Its design was based on the Eppendorf Hospital of Hamburg, in (Germany), one of the most modern at the time. In 2008 the hospital was named the best hospital in customer support in Spain.

However, the two largest hospitals that provide healthcare services to the inhabitants of the city are located outside of the city limits: the University Hospital of Gurutzeta/Cruces in neighbouring Barakaldo and the Galdakao-Usansolo Hospital in Galdakao. Other minor public hospitals located in the city include the Santa Marina Hospital and the Hospital of Urduliz, located in the metropolitan area.

=== Utilities ===
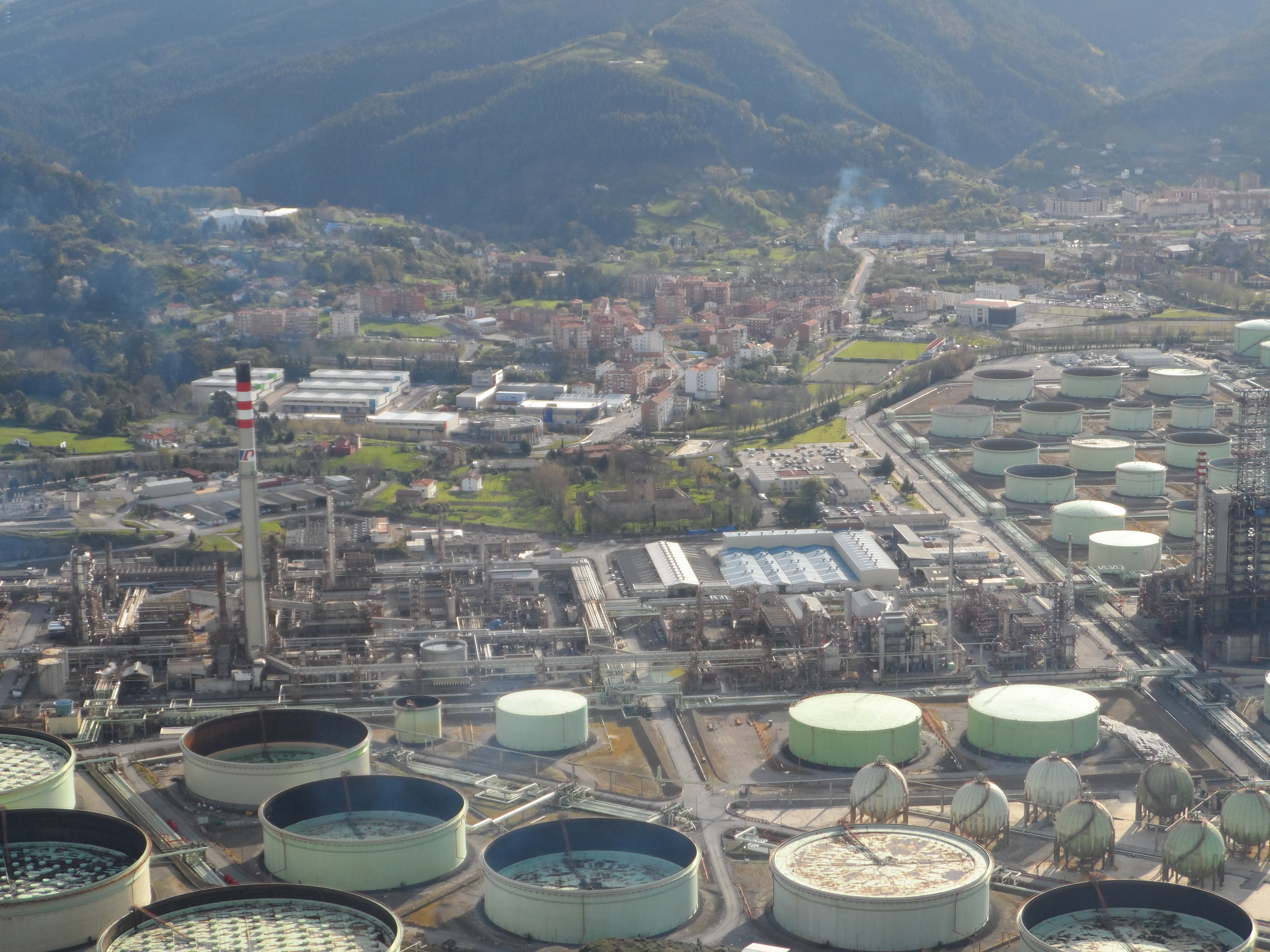
Oil refinery in Muskiz

The headquarters of Iberdrola, a multinational electric utility company are located in Bilbao. The company was created in 1992 after the merging of Iberduero and Hidroeléctrica Española and it is in charge of production and distribution of electricity. There are two thermal power stations located in the city's surroundings, one in Santurtzi and the other in Zierbena. The electricity produced in both these stations is then transferred to the electrical substation of Güeñes by the company Red Eléctrica de España, which is the company responsible of moving electricity from the production stations to the final consumers. There is a combined cycle power station in the municipality of Amorebieta called Bizkaia Energia, whose energy is transferred to the substation of Gatika.

The supply of all oil-based fuels distributed in the whole metropolitan area (gasoline, diesel fuel and butane) are produced in the oil refinery owned by Petronor in the municipalities of Muskiz and Abanto Zierbena. Petronor is a large oil company founded in Bilbao in 1968 and it currently comprises two partners, Repsol (85.98%) and Kutxabank (14.02%).

Supply of drinking water is managed by the Consorcio de Aguas Bilbao Bizkaia (Bilbao Bizkaia Water Consortium), a public entity with the responsibility of managing the water infrastructure and distribution to many Biscayan municipalities, Bilbao and its metropolitan area included. The supply of drinking water for the city comes from the Uribarri-Ganboa and Urrunaga reservoirs, which are fed by the river Zadorra.

== Education ==
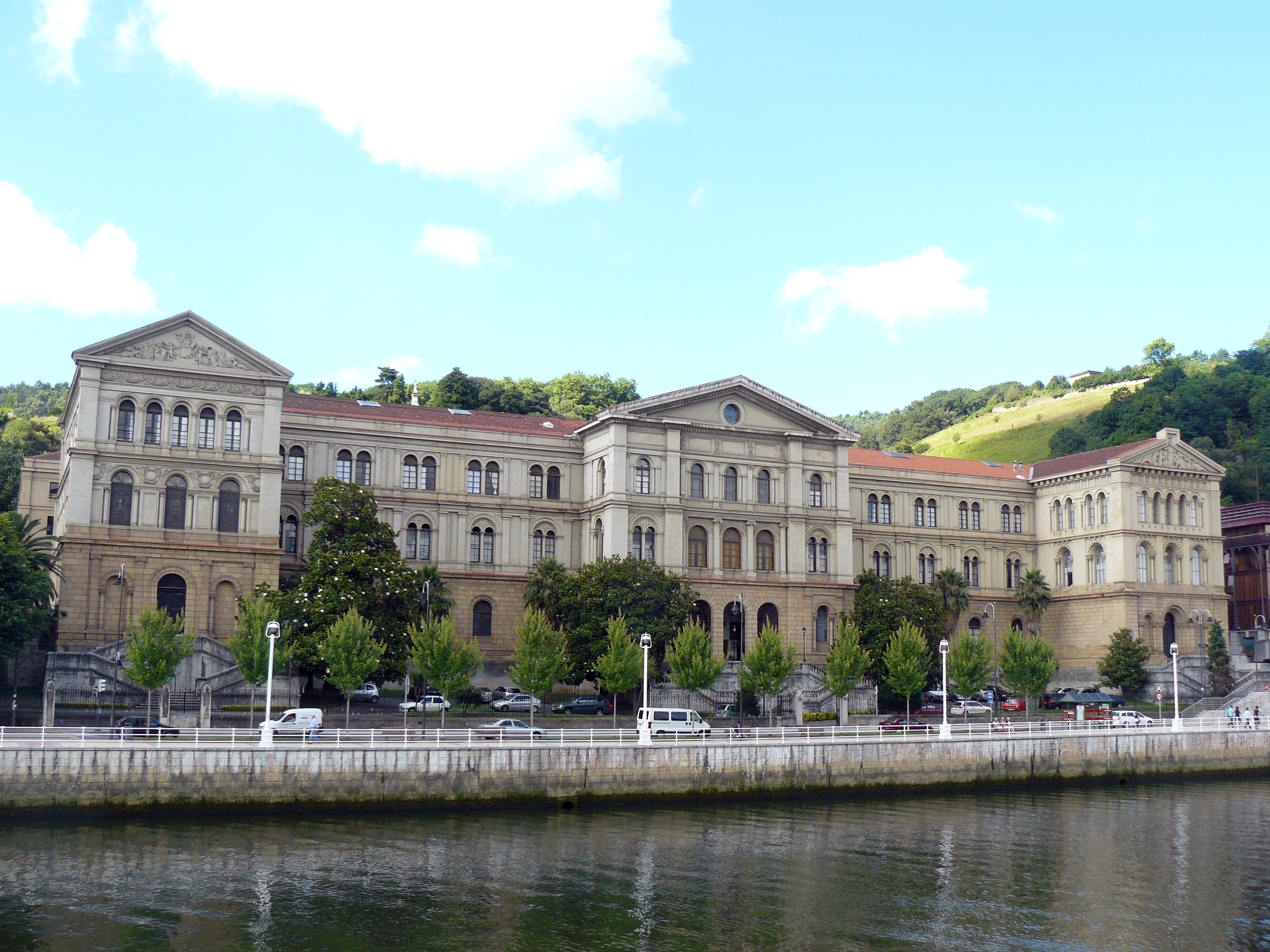
The main building of the University of Deusto

The Basque Country has a bilingual education system, with students able to choose between four linguistic models: A, B, D, and X, which differ in the prevalence of Basque or Spanish as the spoken and written language used in classes. In Bilbao, there is a prevalence of model D (where Basque is the vehicle language and Spanish is taught as a subject) in Primary School, while Compulsory Secondary Education students favour model B (where some subjects are in Basque and other in Spanish). Finally, 67% of Baccalaureate students choose model A (in which Spanish is the vehicle language and Basque is a subject). English is the most widespread foreign language taught, being the option for 97% of pre-university students.

=== Higher education ===
Two universities are seated in Bilbao. The older is the University of Deusto, founded by the Society of Jesus in 1886. It took its name from the then independent municipality of Deusto, annexed to Bilbao in 1925. It was the only higher education institute in the borough until the establishment in 1968 of the University of Bilbao, later to become the University of the Basque Country in 1980. This public university, which has a presence in the three provinces of the autonomous community, has its main Biscayan campus in the municipality of Leioa, although the Technical and Business faculties are based in Bilbao. Since 2014, Mondragon University has also a presence in the city through the innovation and entrepreneurial centre Bilbao Innovation Factory. In 2015, the offer of higher education in the city was expanded with the foundation of Dantzerti, the Higher School of Dramatic Arts and Dance of the Basque Country.

== Sport ==
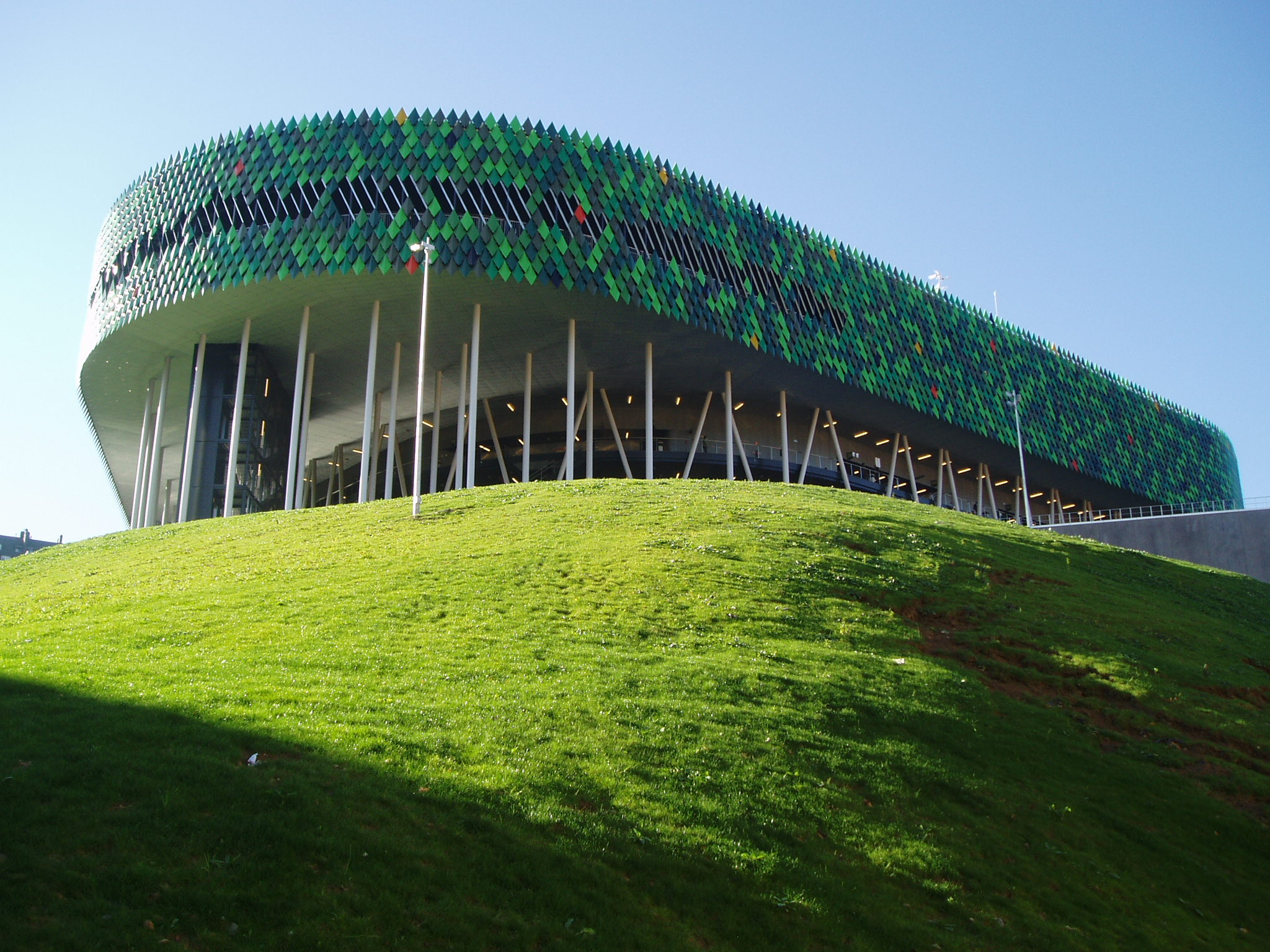
The Bilbao Arena, home venue of Bilbao Basket

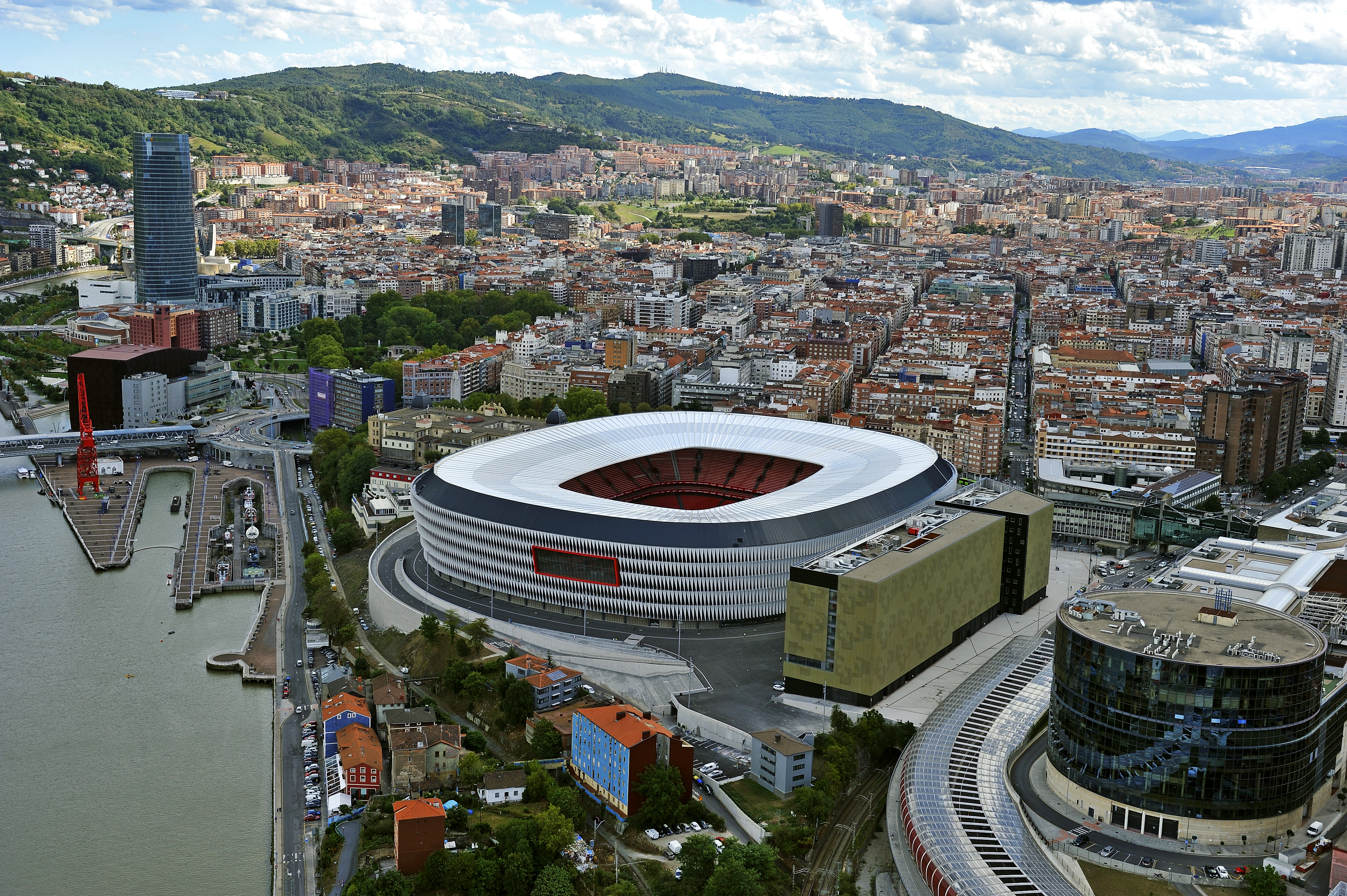
The San Mamés stadium, home venue of Athletic Bilbao

As in the rest of Spain, football is the most popular competitive sport, followed by basketball. Some people are interested in basque sports, one of the oldest sports in Spain. One could enjoy a Basque pelota match in Bizkaia Frontoia, Bilbao. In addition, Bilbao offers many outdoor activities owing to its location by the sea amid the hilly countryside. Hiking and rock climbing in the nearby mountains are very popular. Watersports, especially surfing, are practised on the beaches of nearby Sopelana and Mundaka.

=== Clubs ===
Football

The main football club is Athletic Club, commonly known as Athletic Bilbao in English. It plays at the new San Mamés stadium, which opened in 2013 and seats 53,332 spectators. Athletic Bilbao was one of the founding members of the Spanish football league, La Liga, and has played in the Primera División (First Division) ever since – winning it on eight occasions. Its red and white striped flag can be seen throughout the city. Athletic is noted for its Basque policy, in place since 1911, with only players born in or having a clear connection to the Basque region being allowed to represent the club.

Basketball

The main basketball club is Bilbao Basket, which plays in the Spanish top division Liga ACB and their home venue is the Bilbao Arena. The main achievements of the clubs were being the runner-up of the Liga ACB during the 2010–2011 season, losing the final series 3–0 against FC Barcelona Bàsquet; as well as the runner-up of the EuroCup Basketball in the 2012–2013 edition, where they lost to the Russian team Lokomotiv Kuban.

== Main sights ==
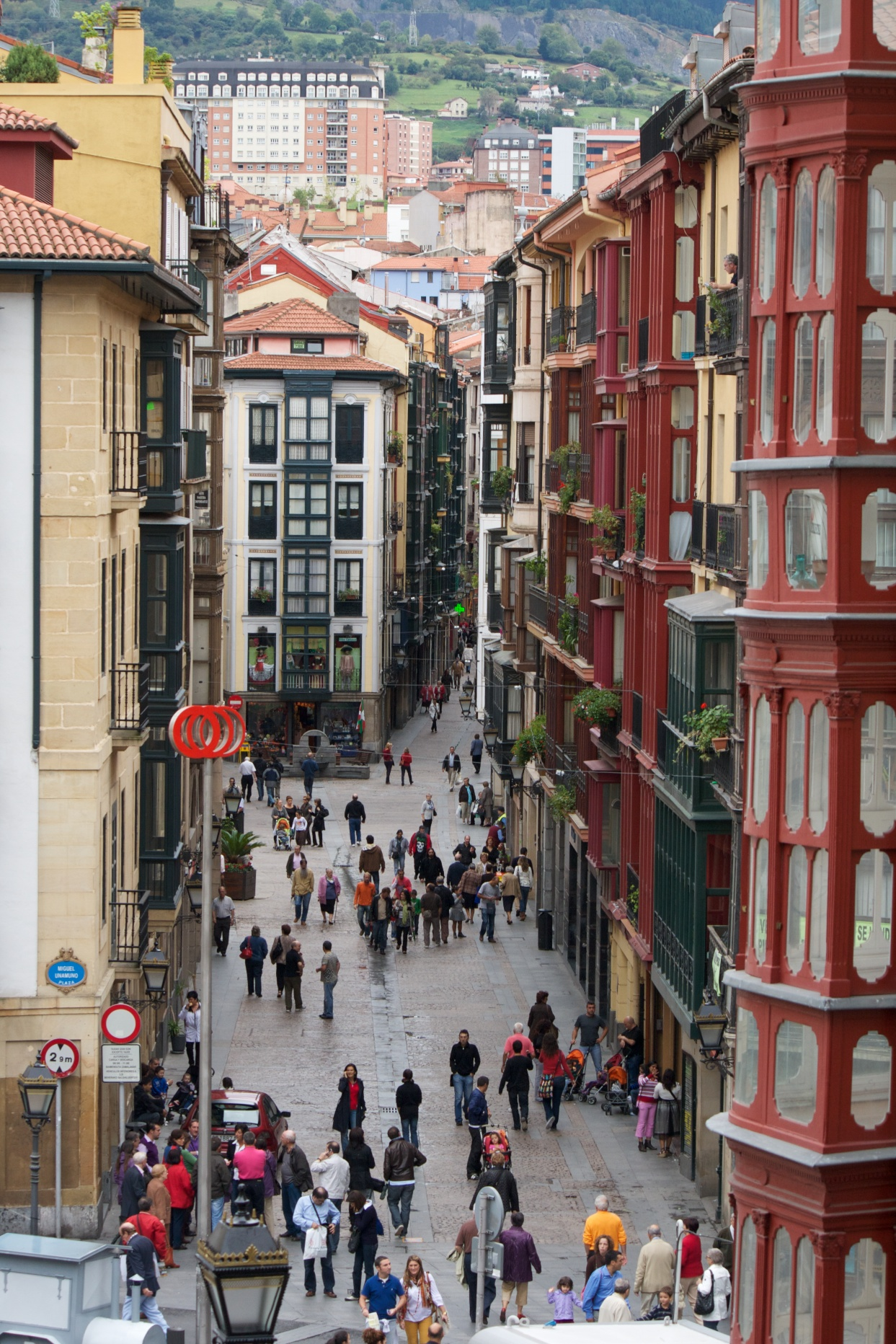
Casco Viejo

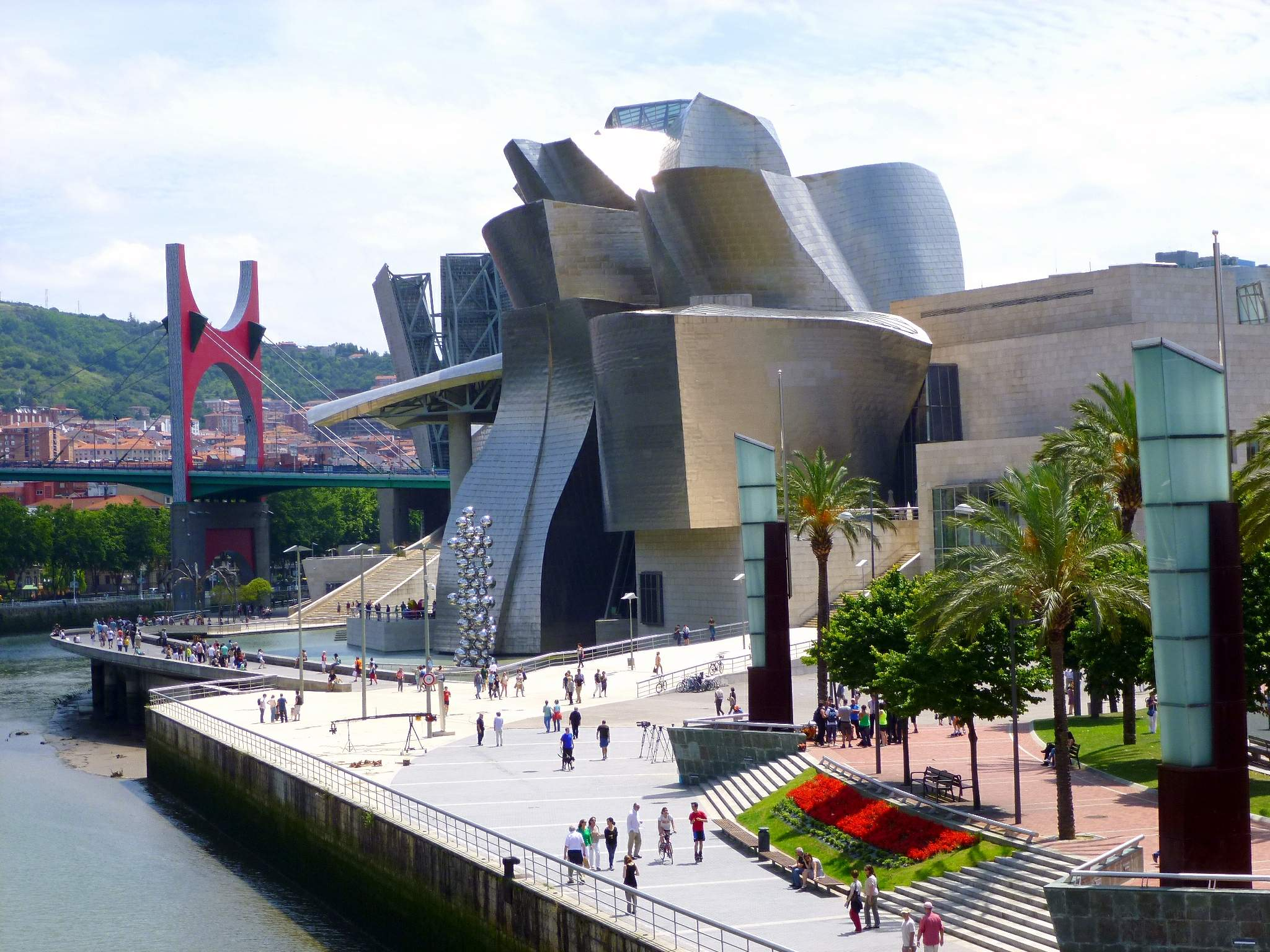
Guggenheim Museum Bilbao

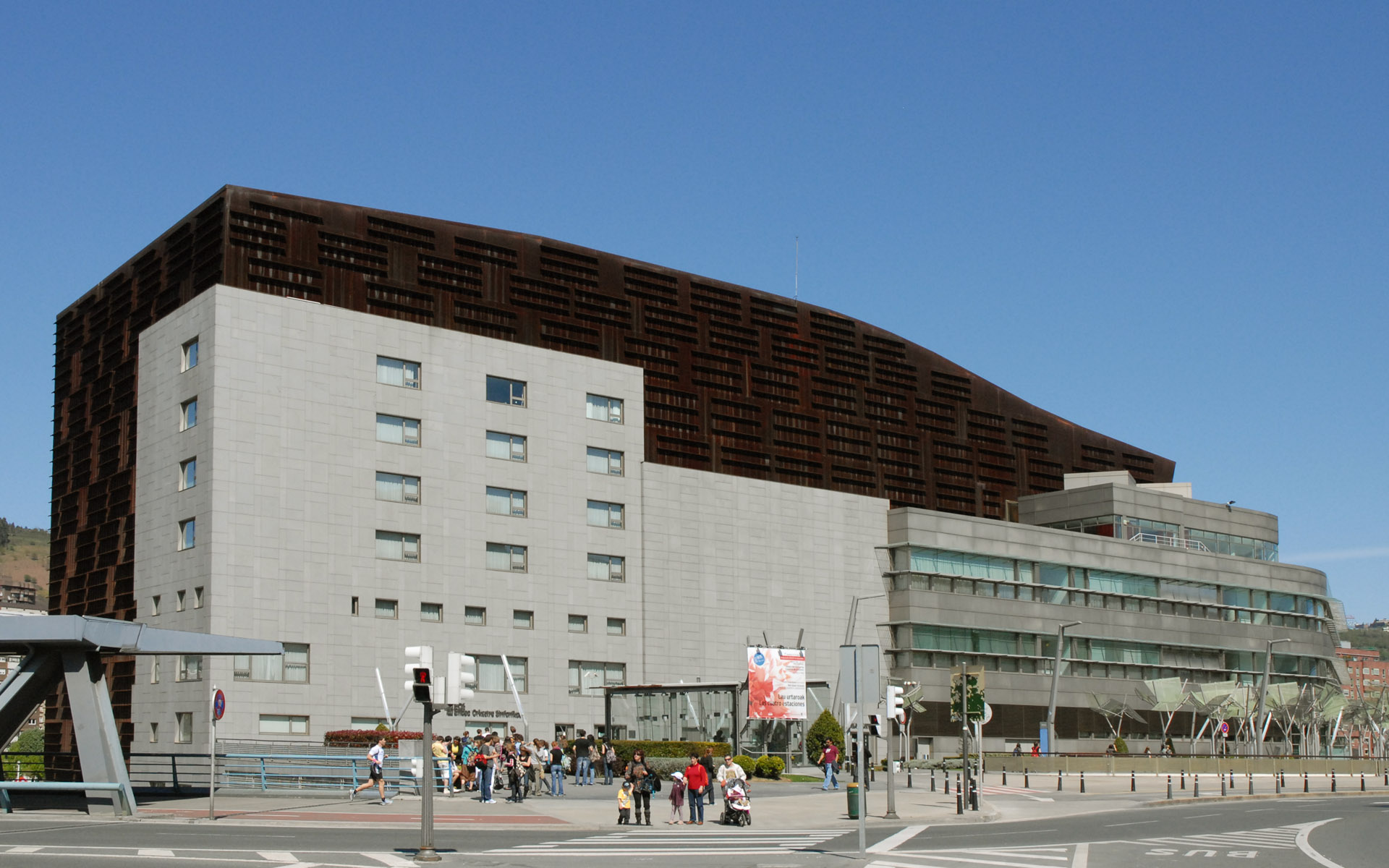
Euskalduna Conference Centre and Concert Hall

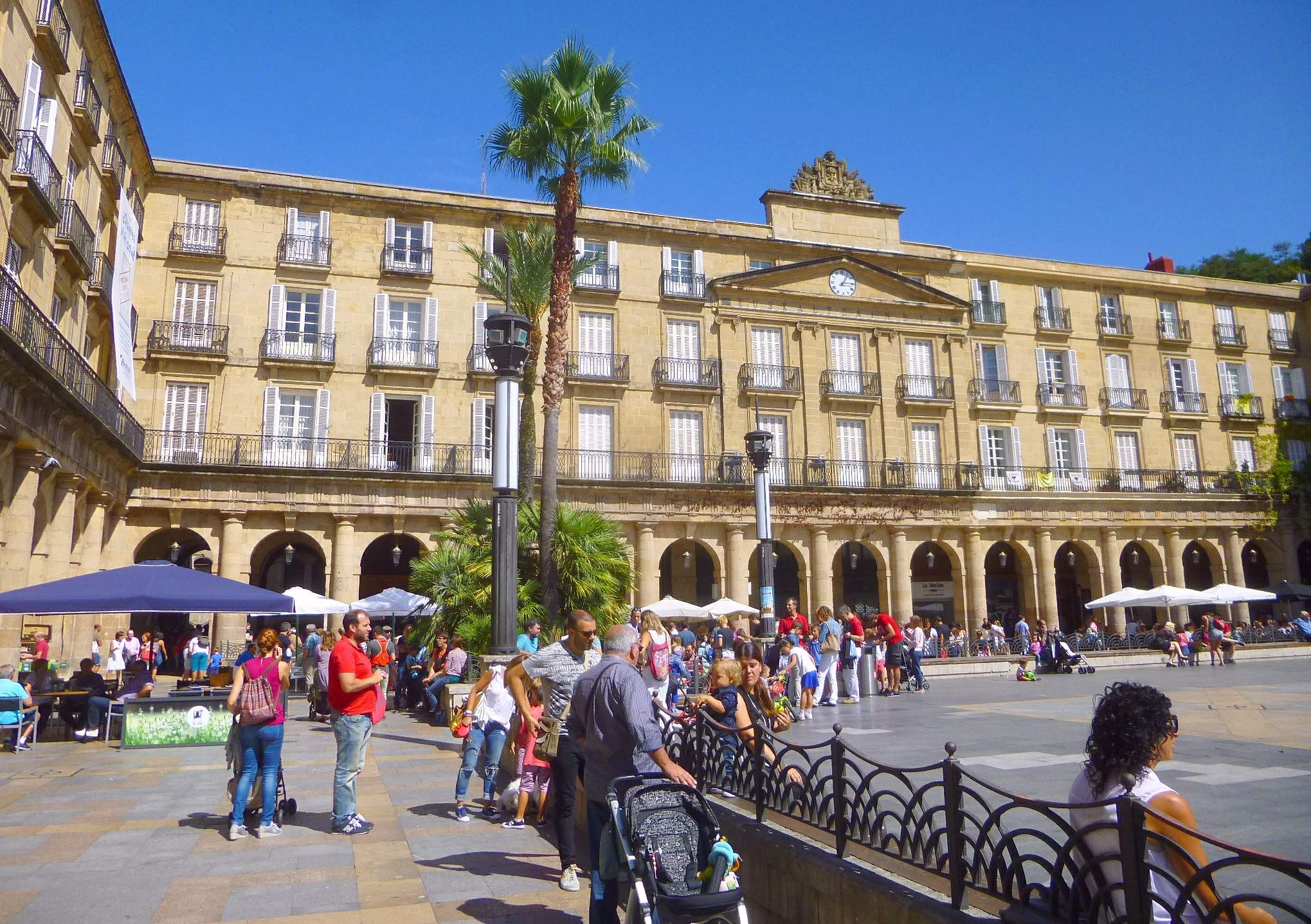
Plaza Nueva

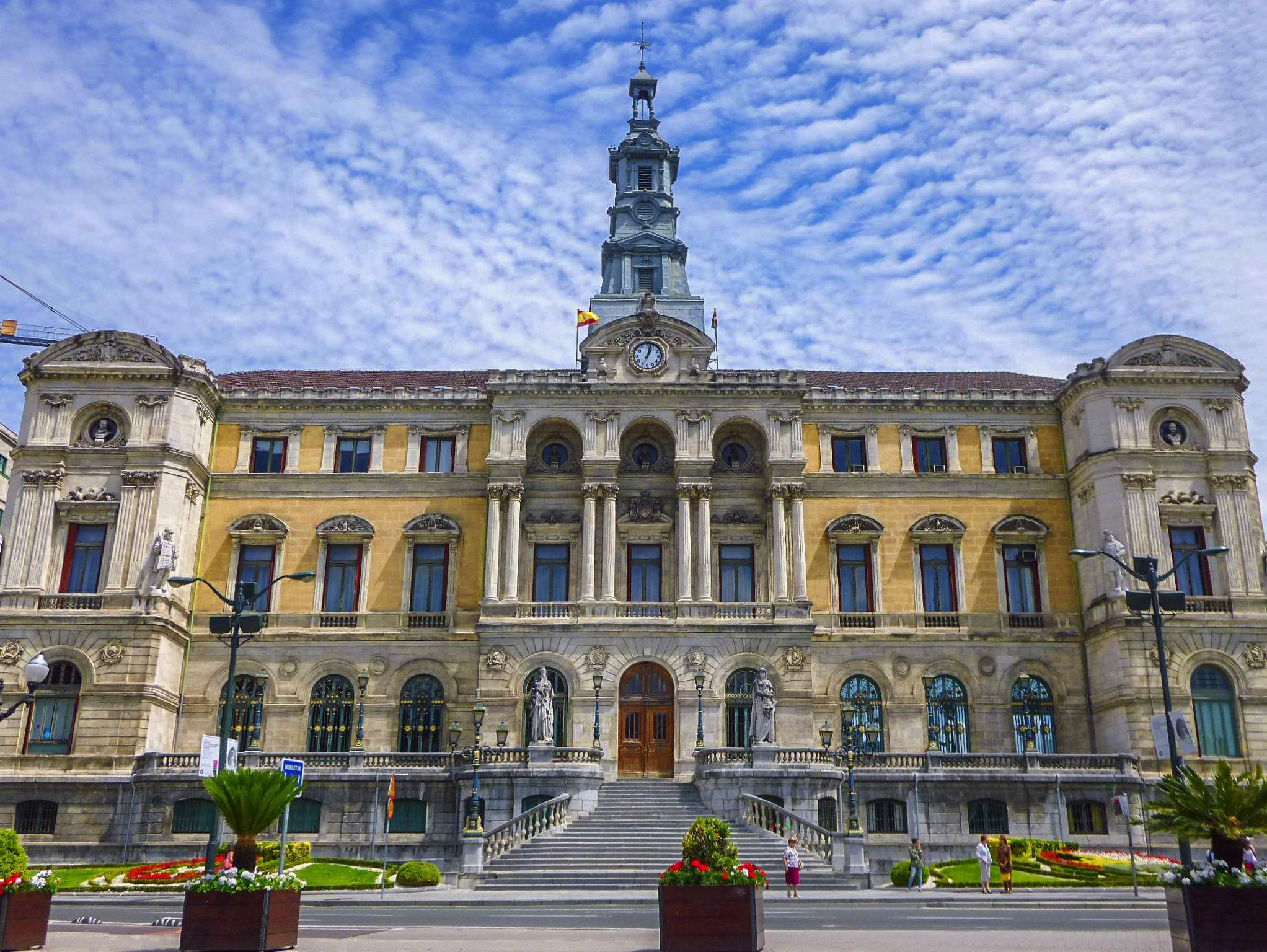
Bilbao City Hall

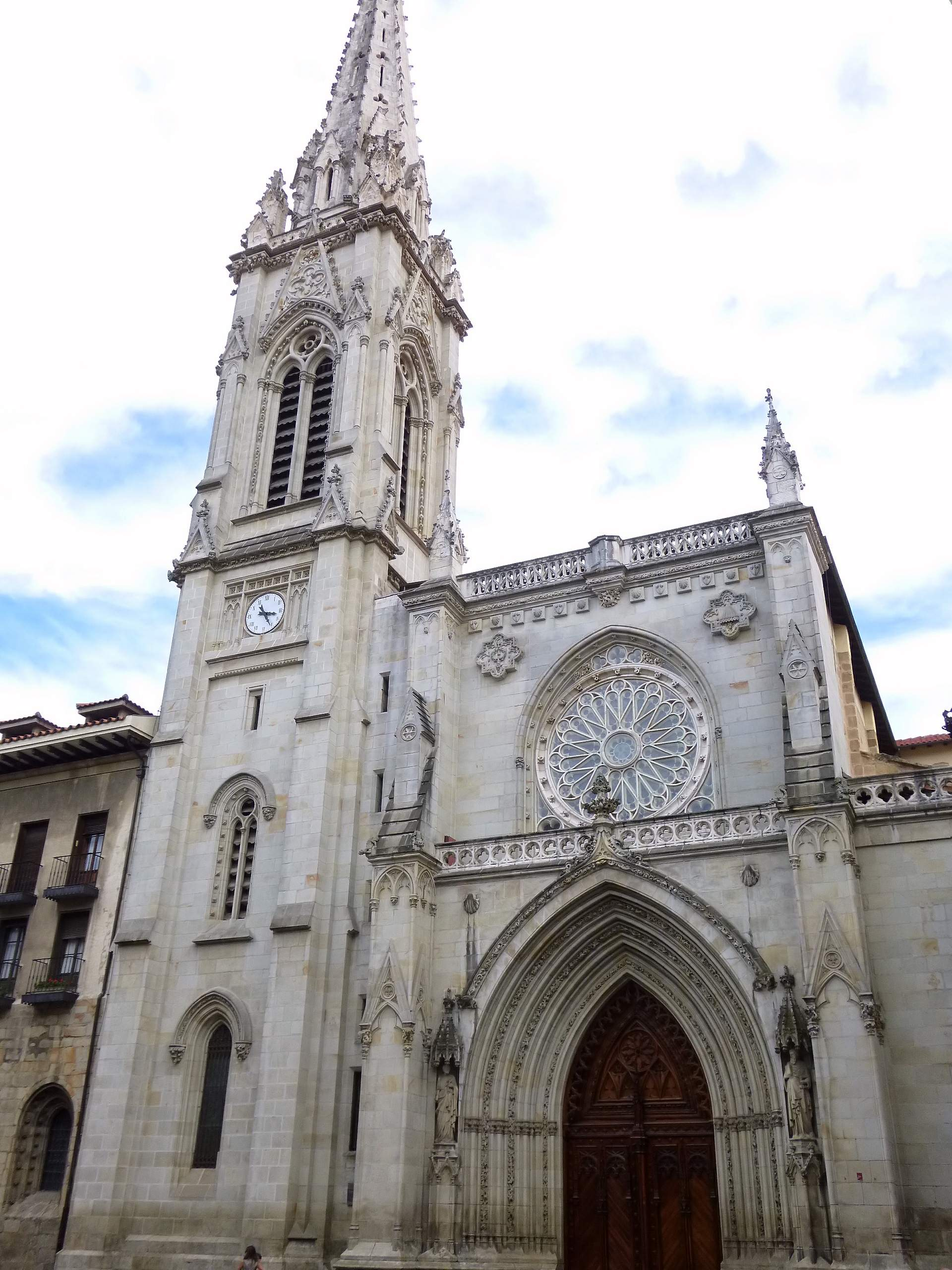
Bilbao Cathedral

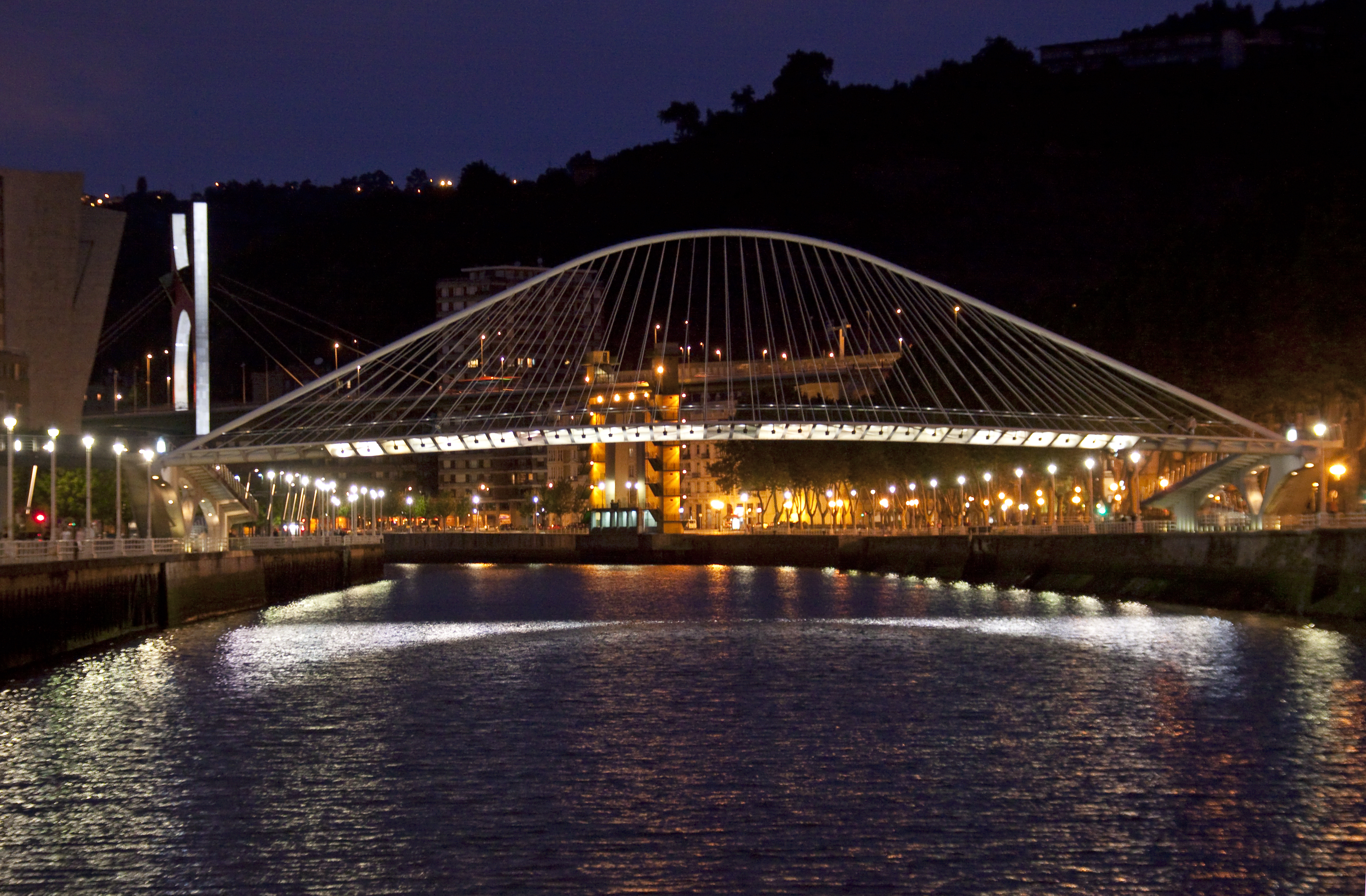
Zubizuri bridge

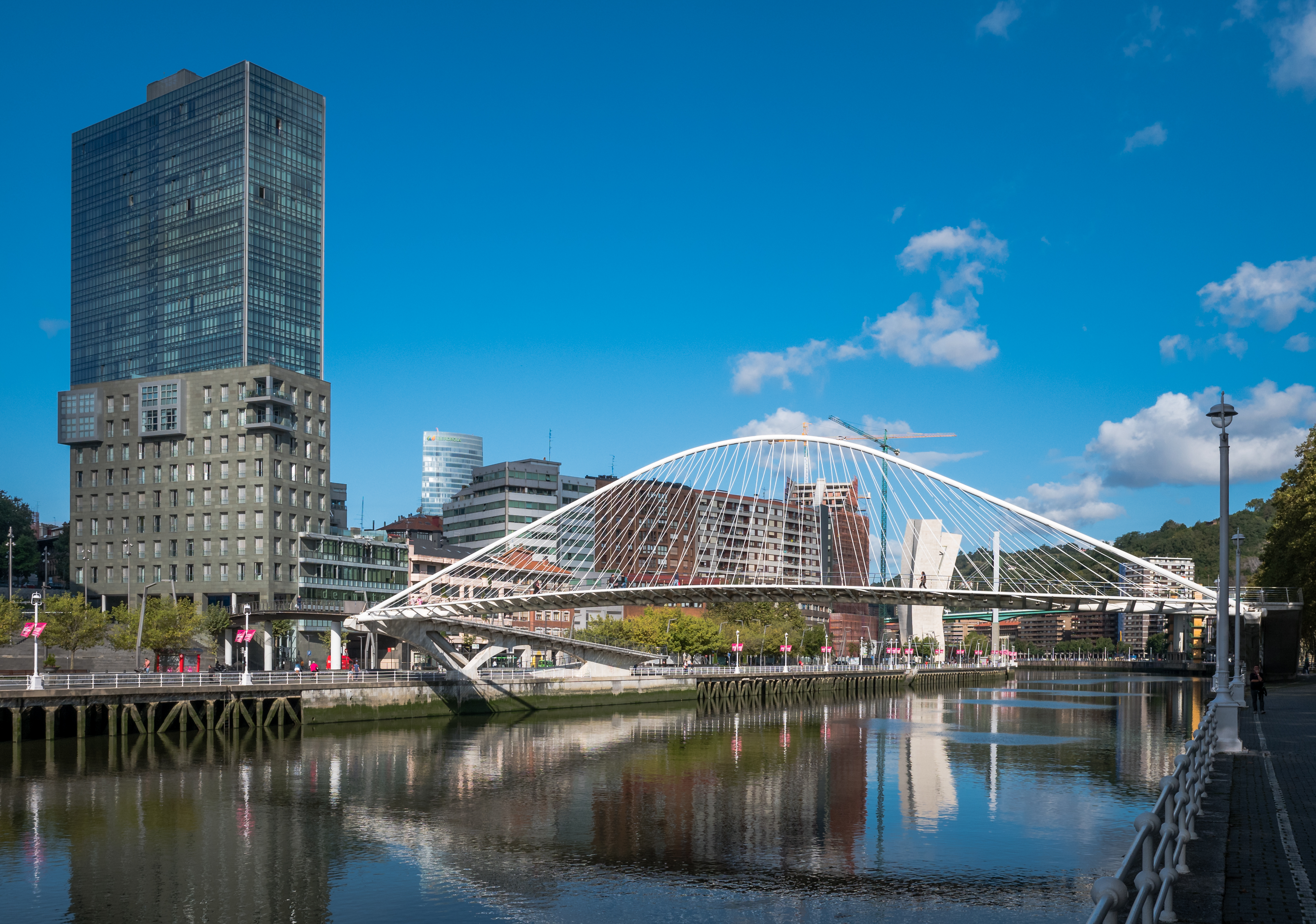
Zubizuri from the other side

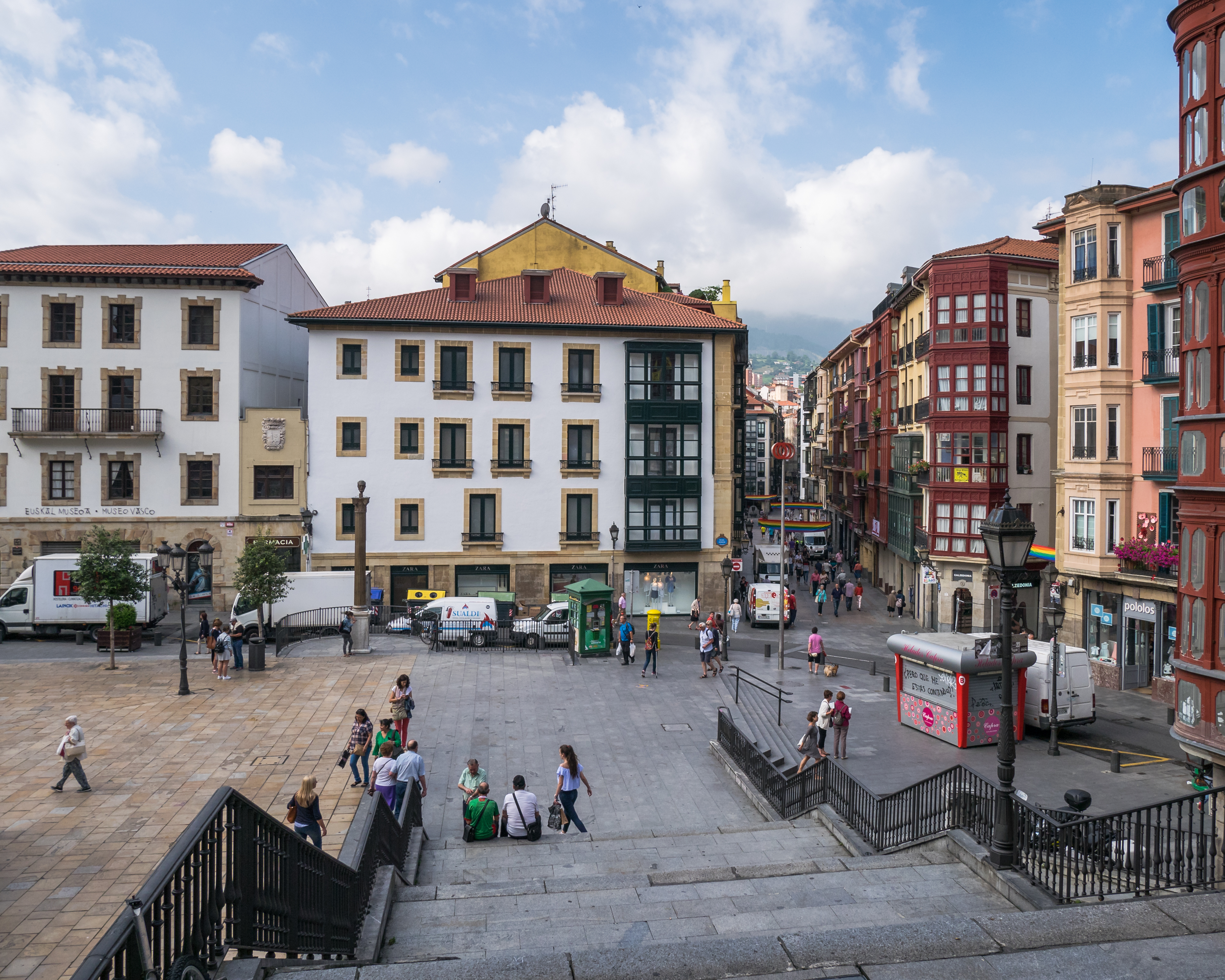
Basque Museum and Unamuno Plaza

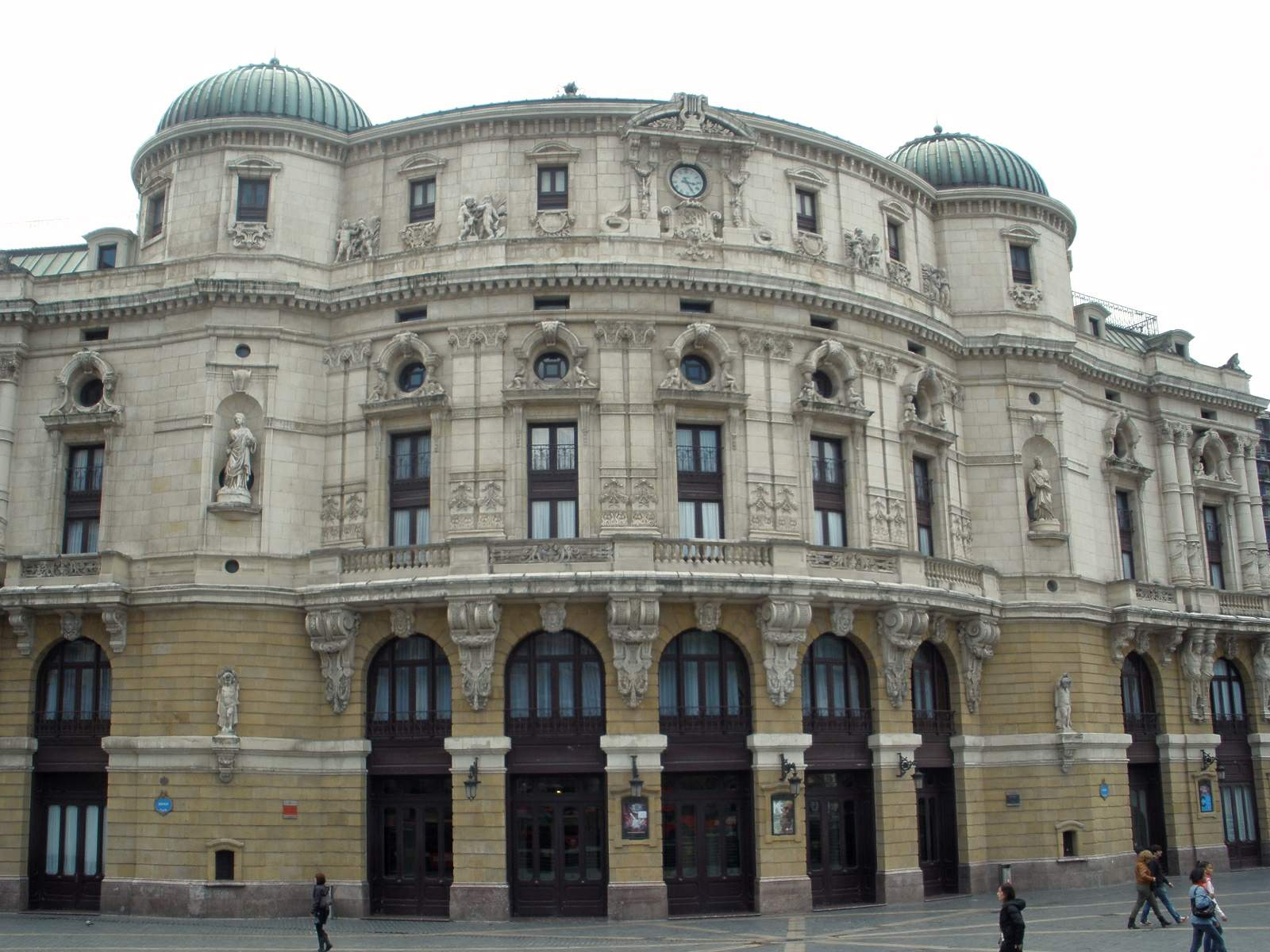
Arriaga Theatre

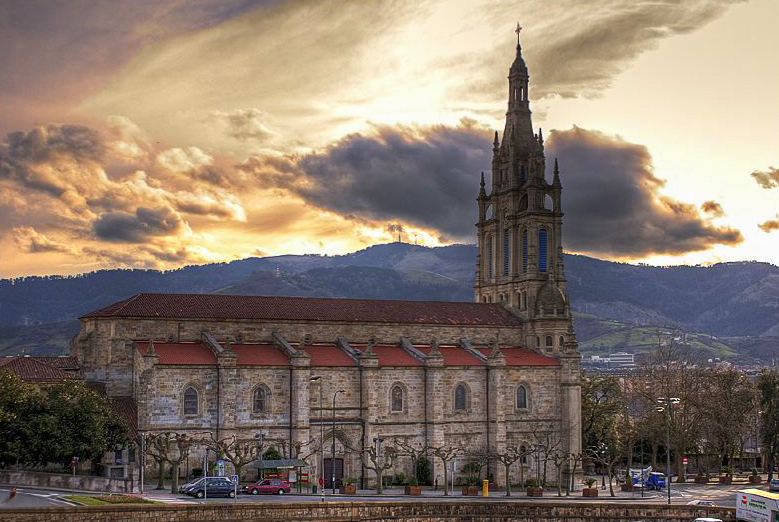
Basilica of Begoña

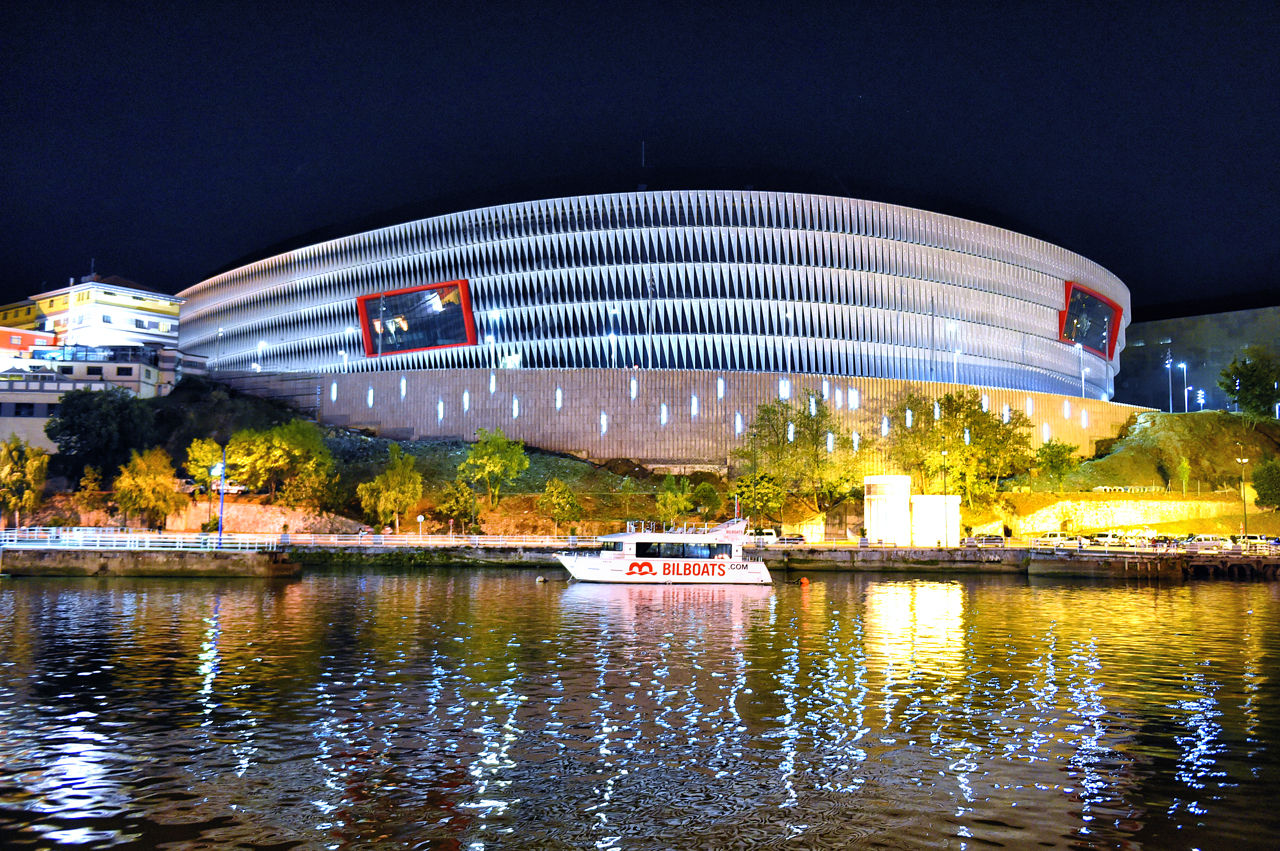
San Mamés Stadium

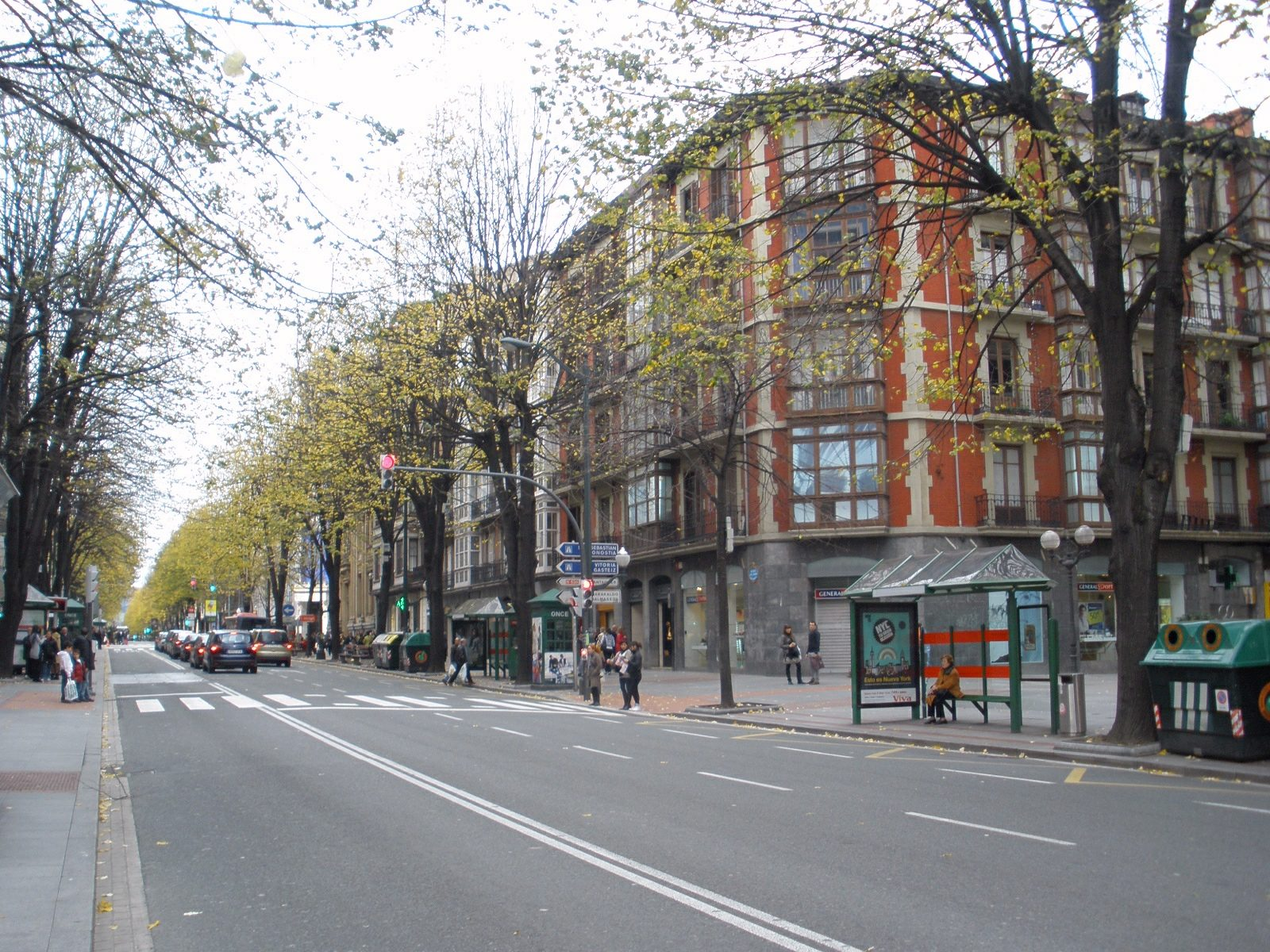
Gran Vía de Don Diego López de Haro

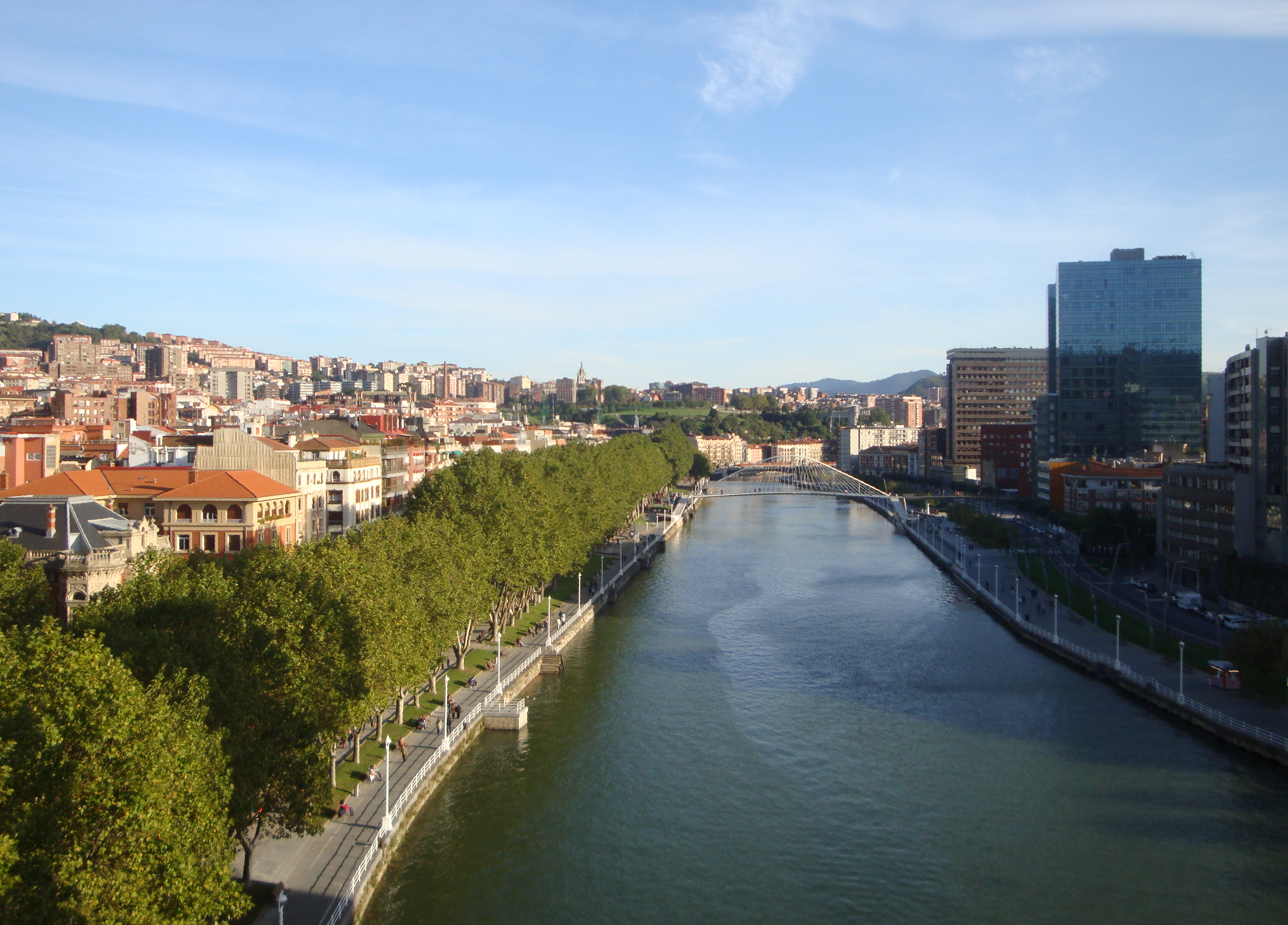
Estuary of Bilbao

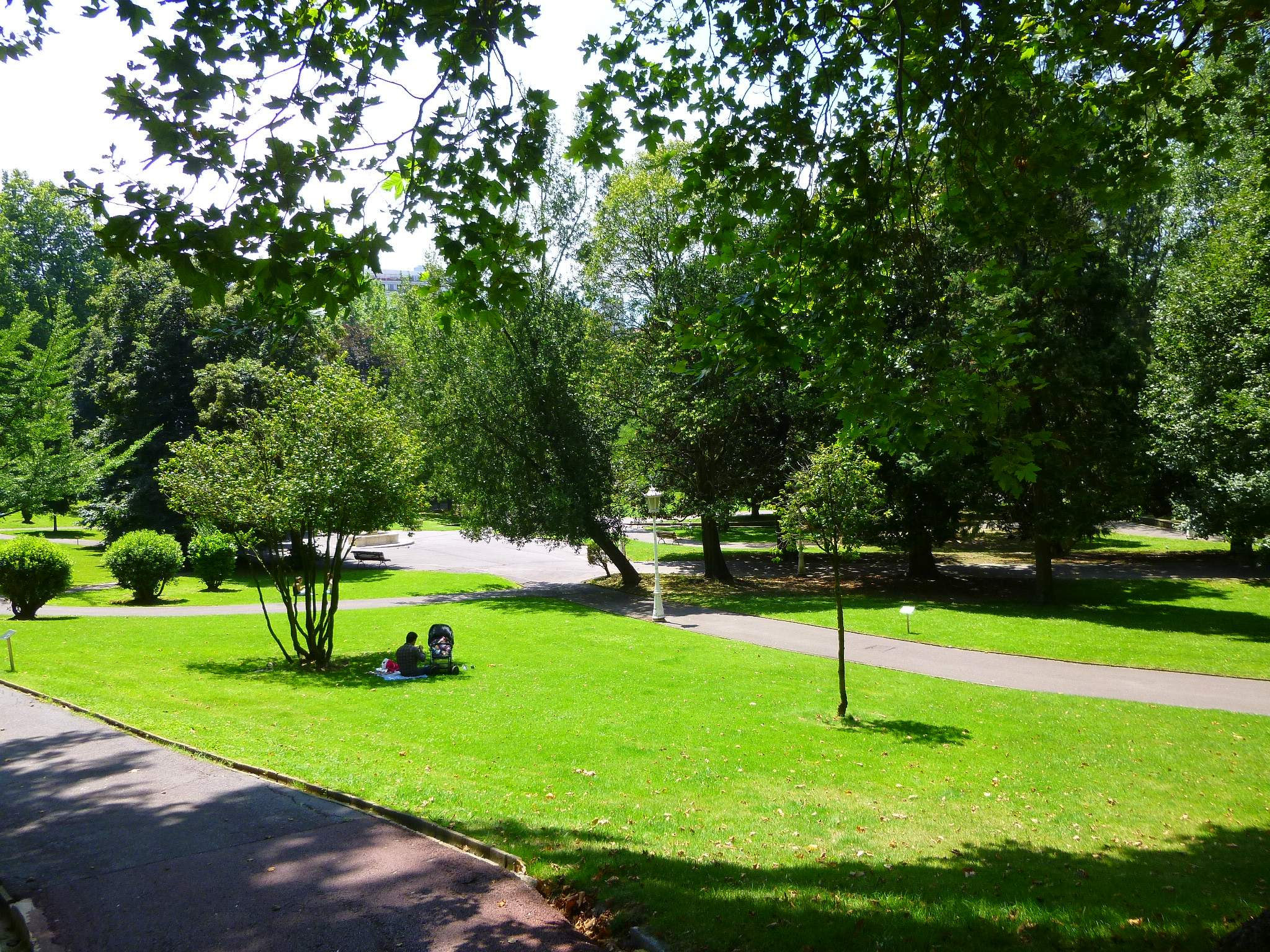
Doña Casilda Iturrizar park

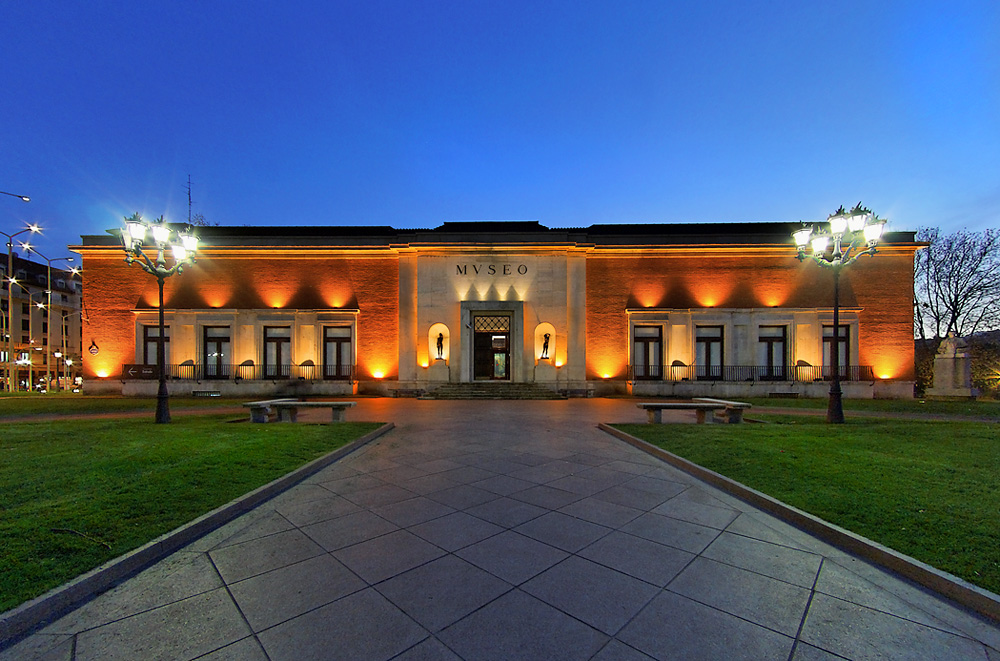
Bilbao Fine Arts Museum

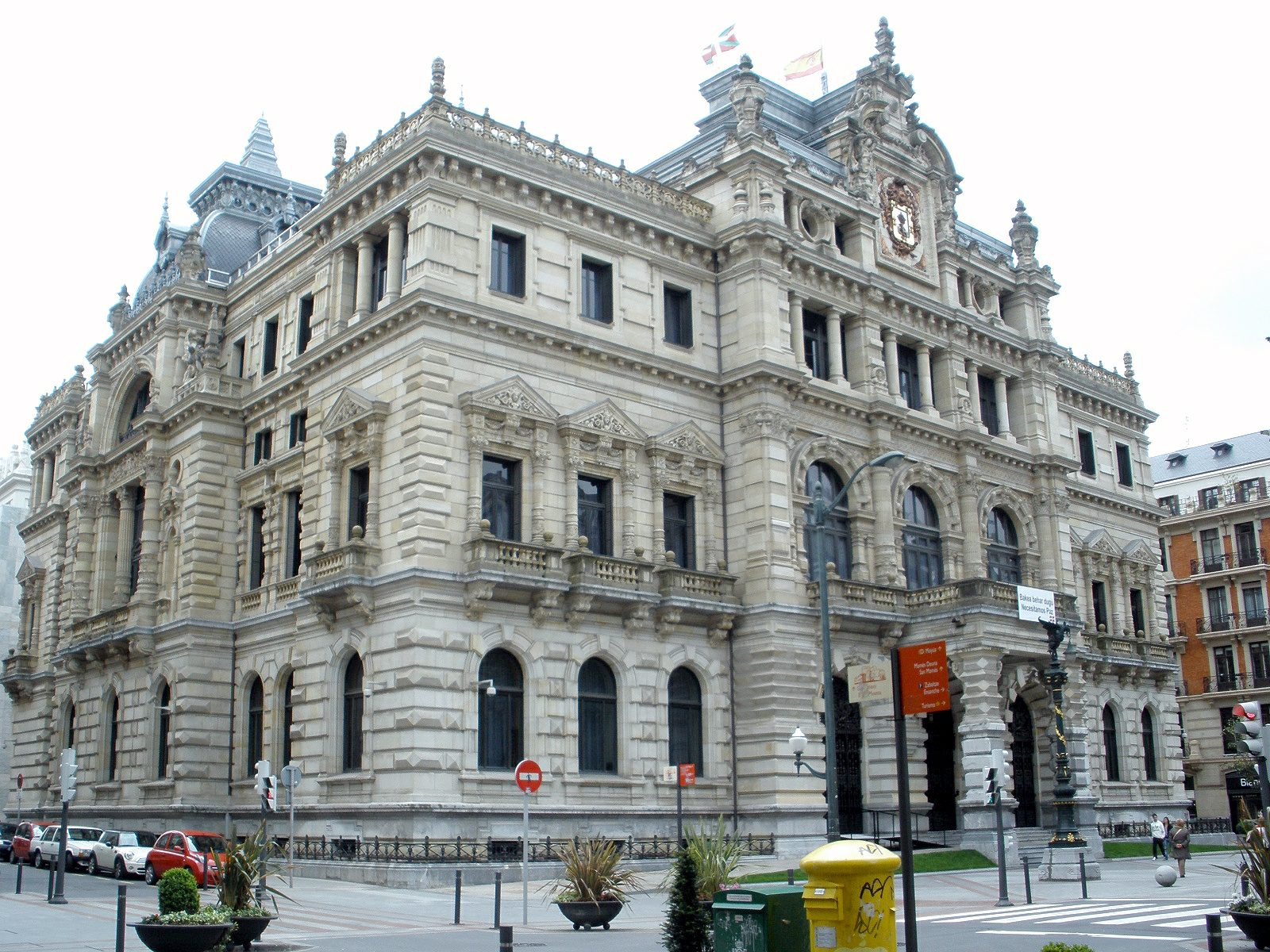
Provincial Government Palace

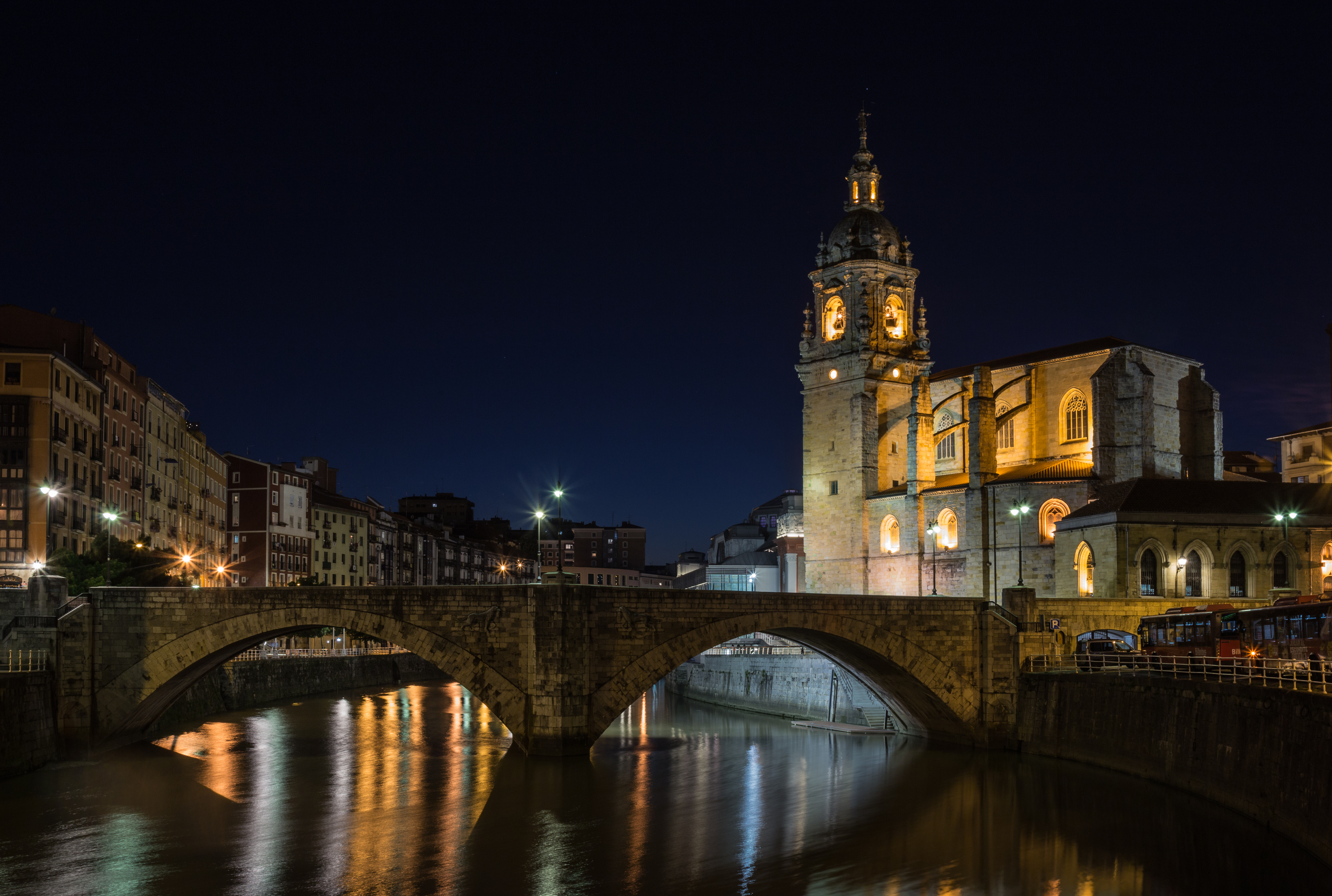
Church of San Antón and San Antón Bridge

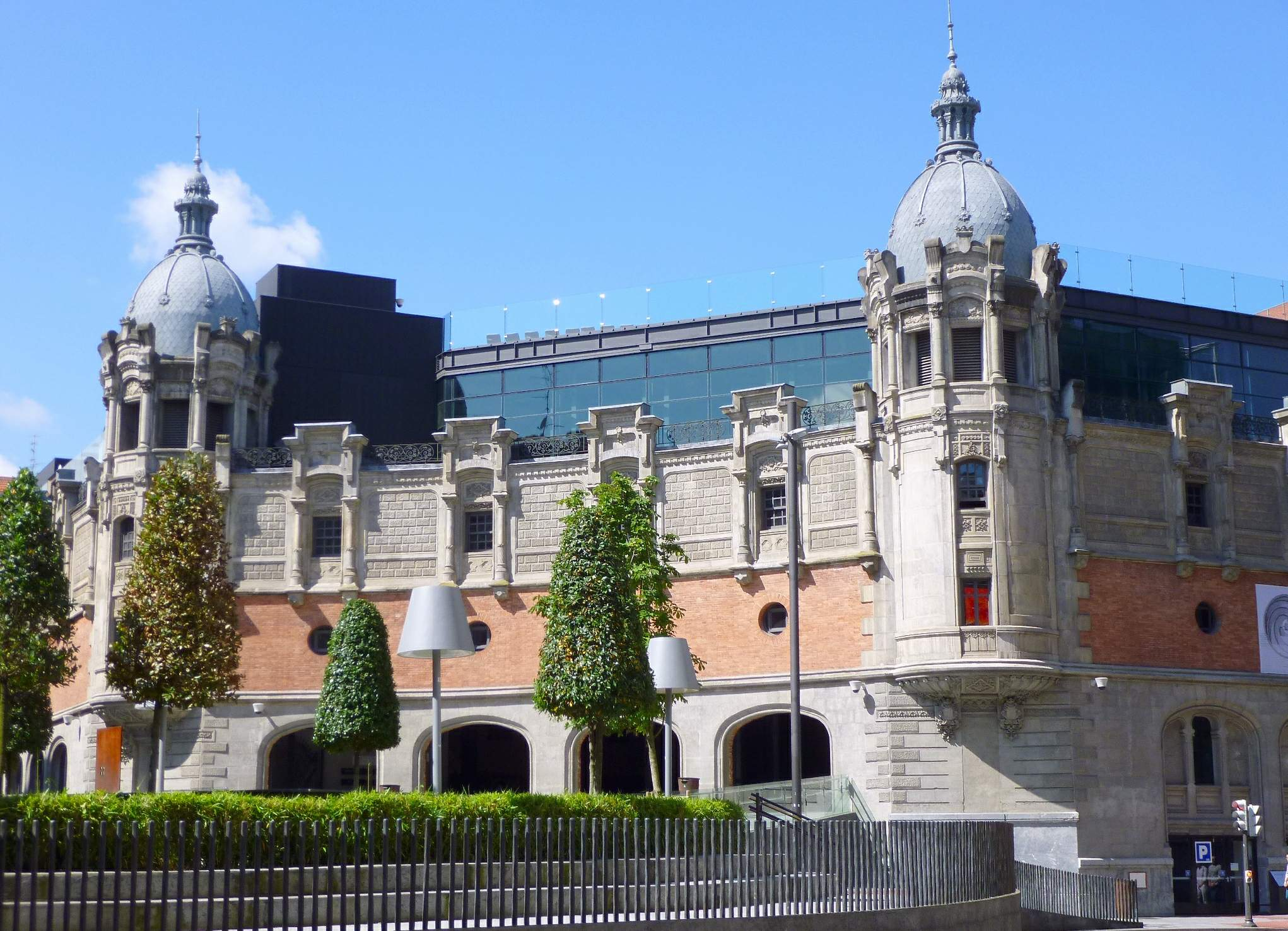
Azkuna Zentroa

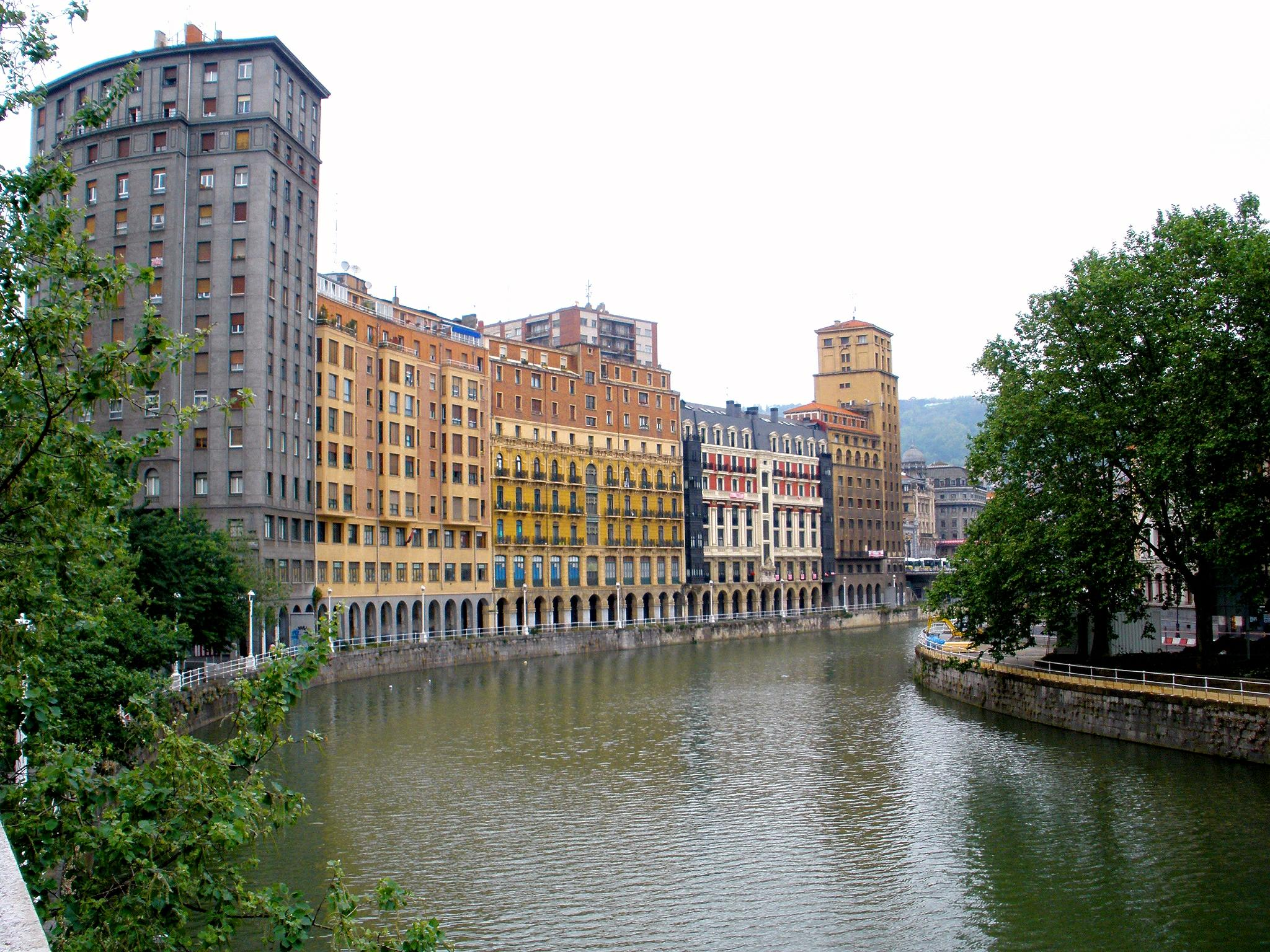
Ria de Bilbao

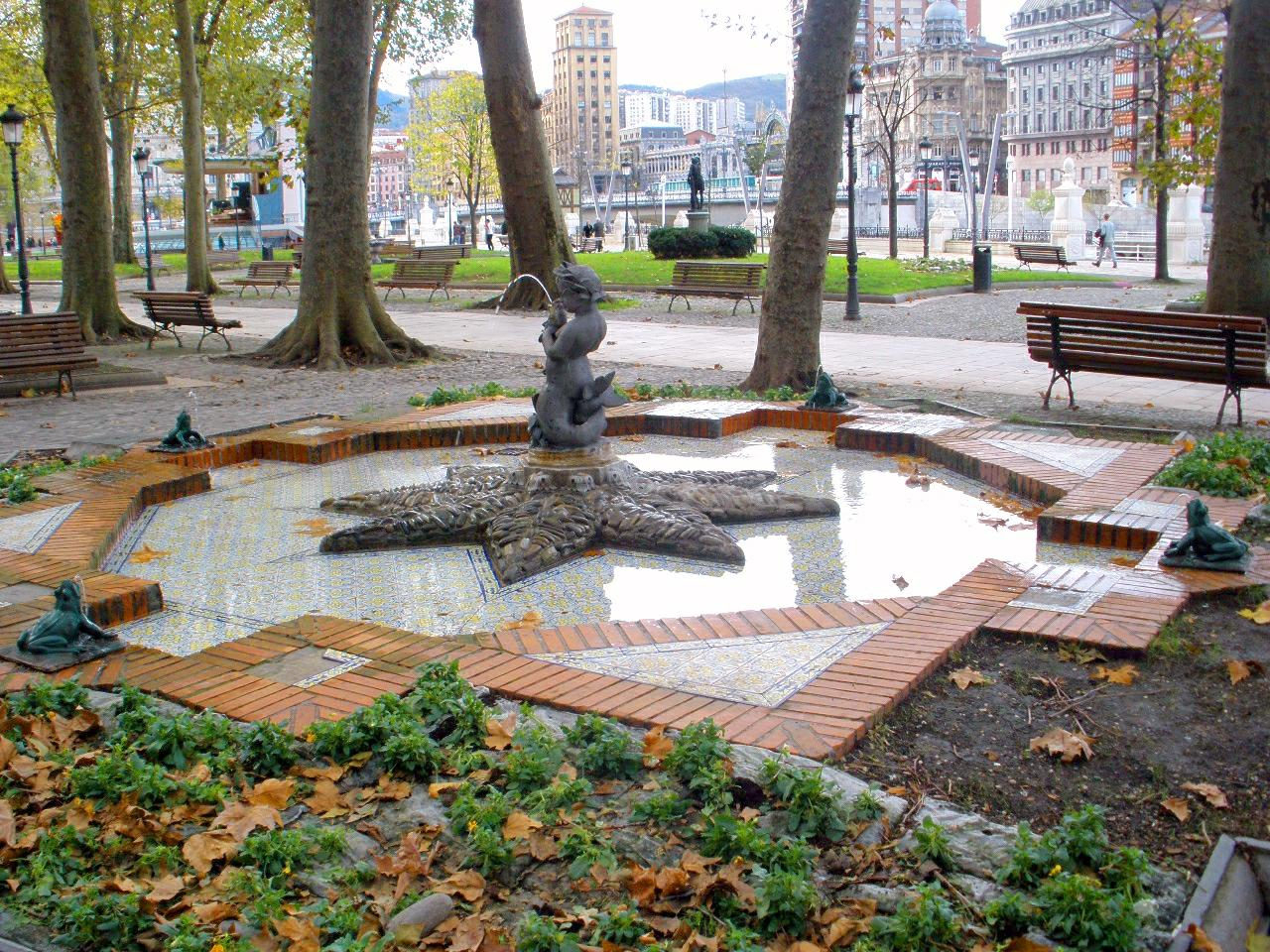
El Arenal Park

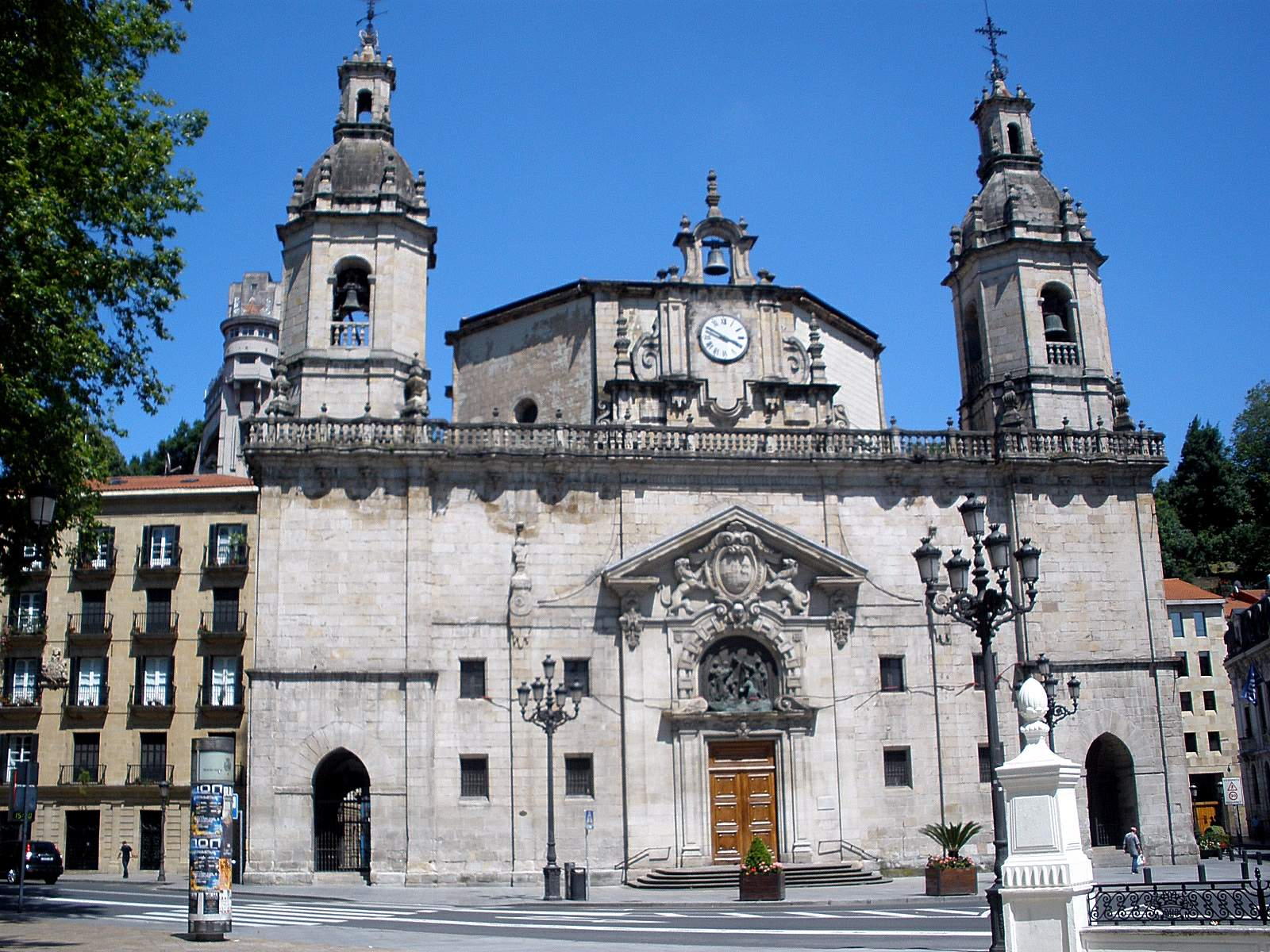
Church of San Nicolás

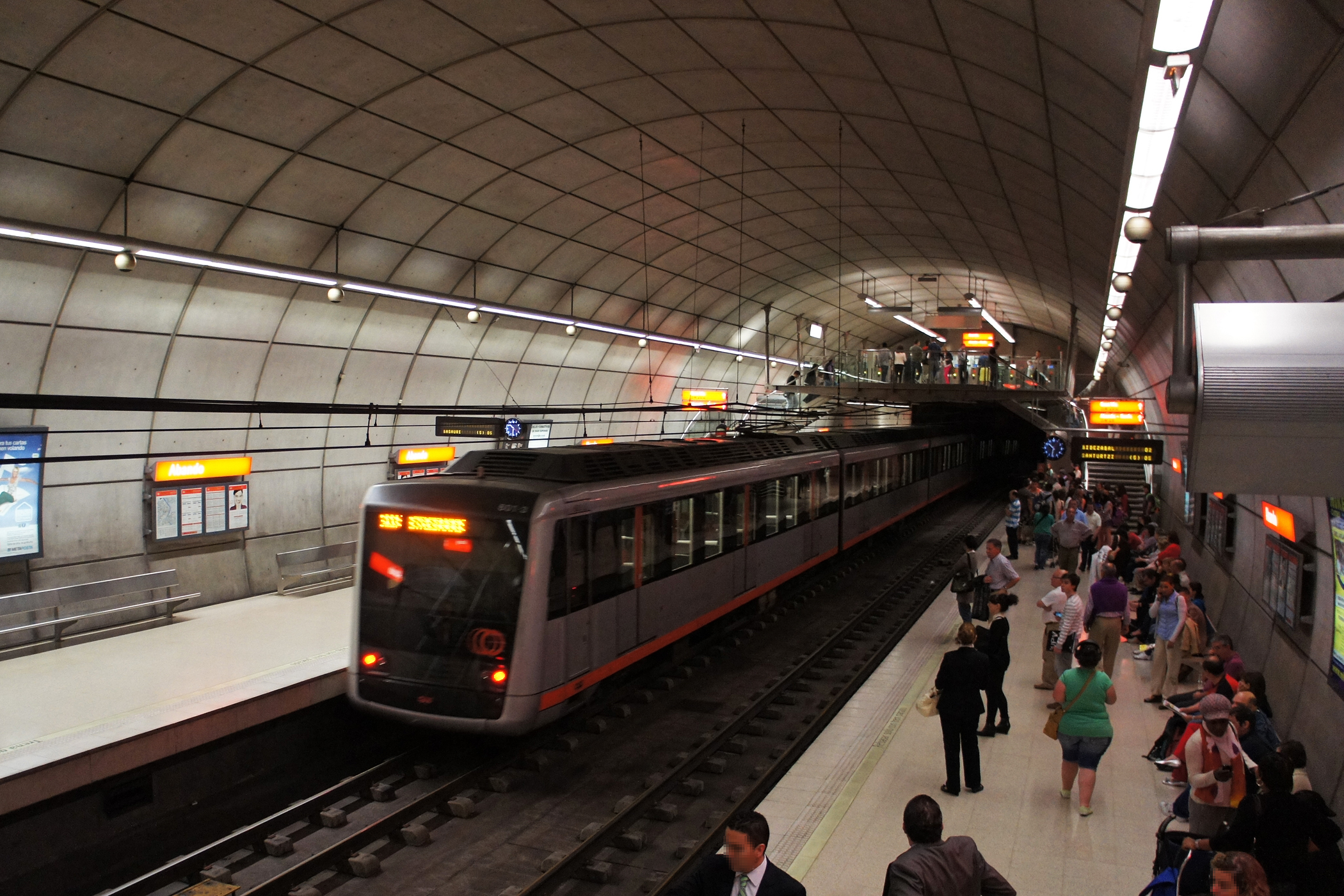
Bilbao Metro, a work of Norman Foster

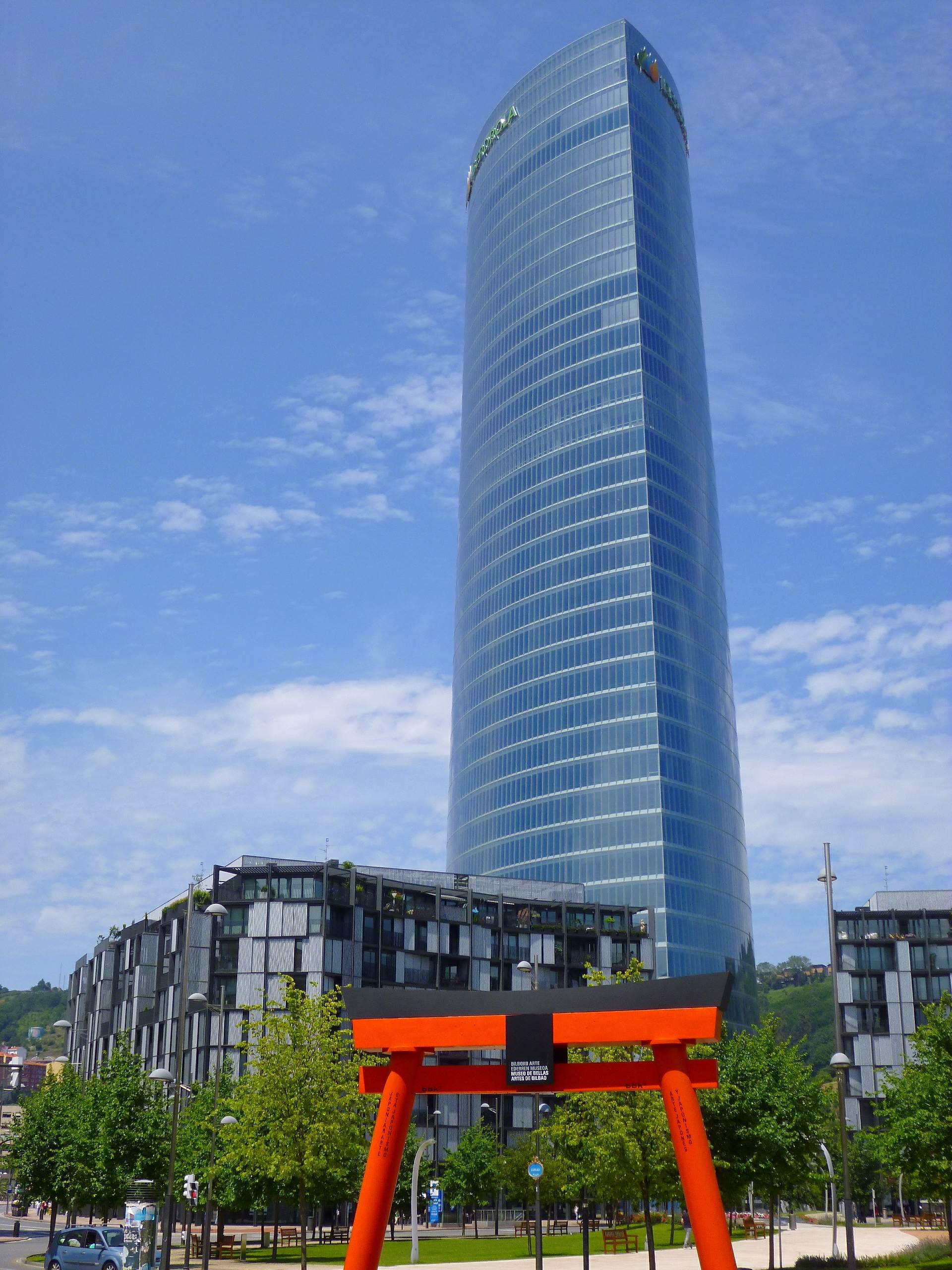
Iberdrola Tower

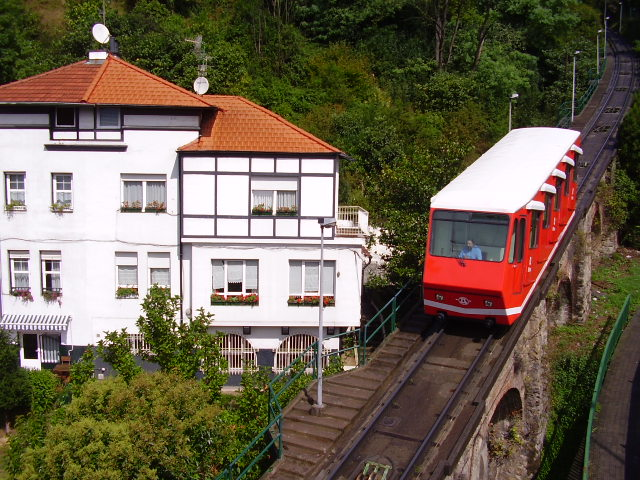
Funicular to Mount Artxanda

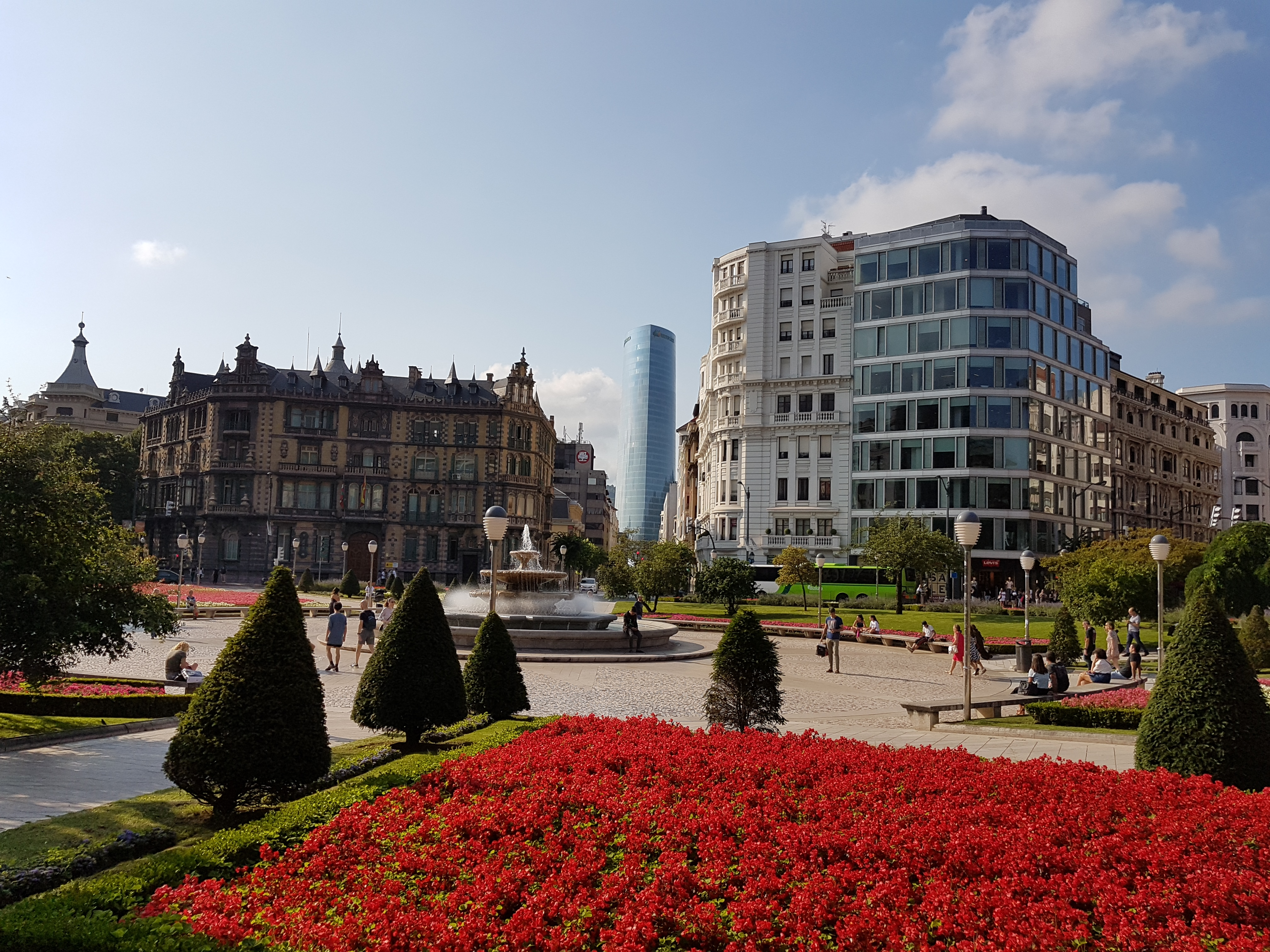
Plaza Elíptica

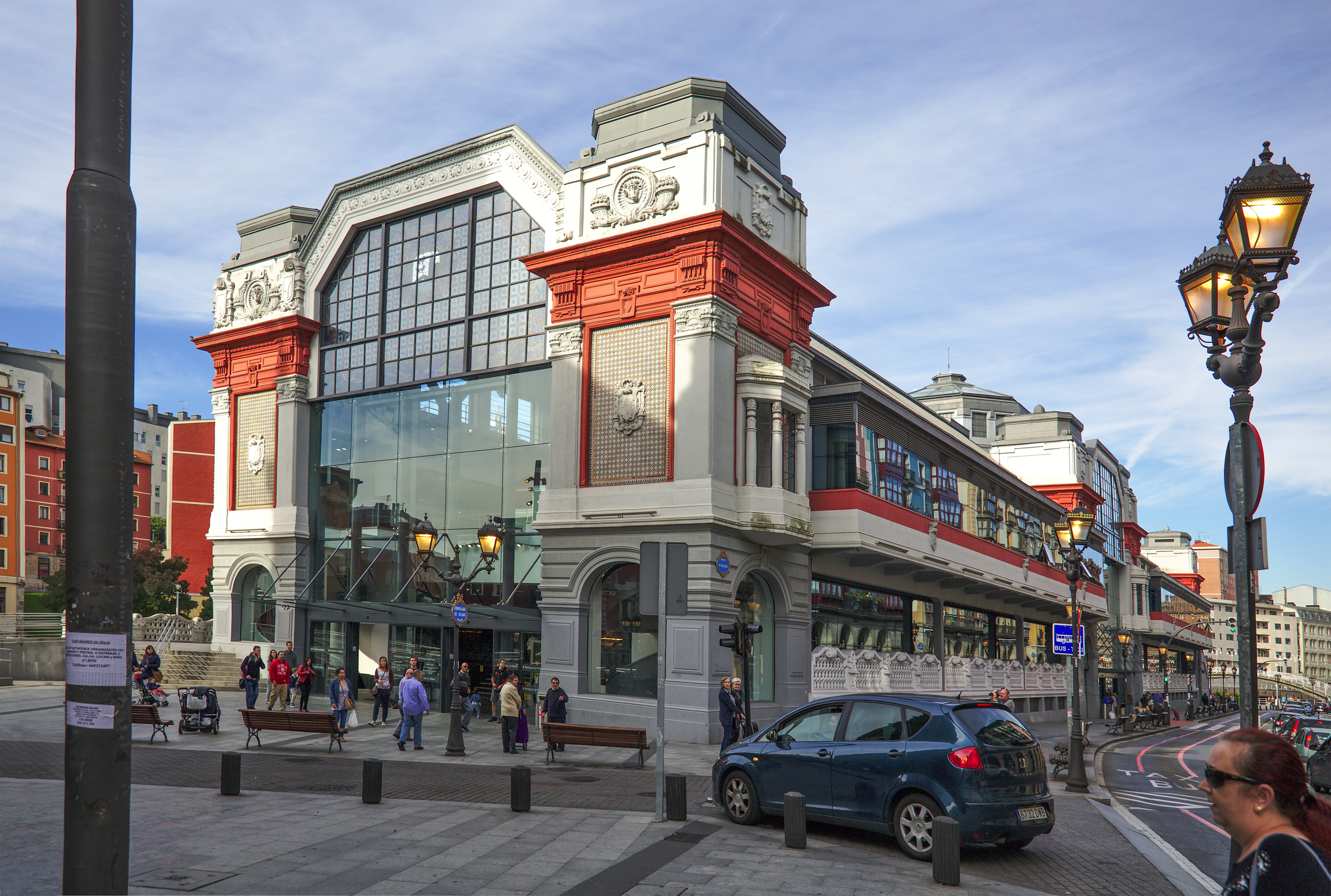
Mercado de la Ribera

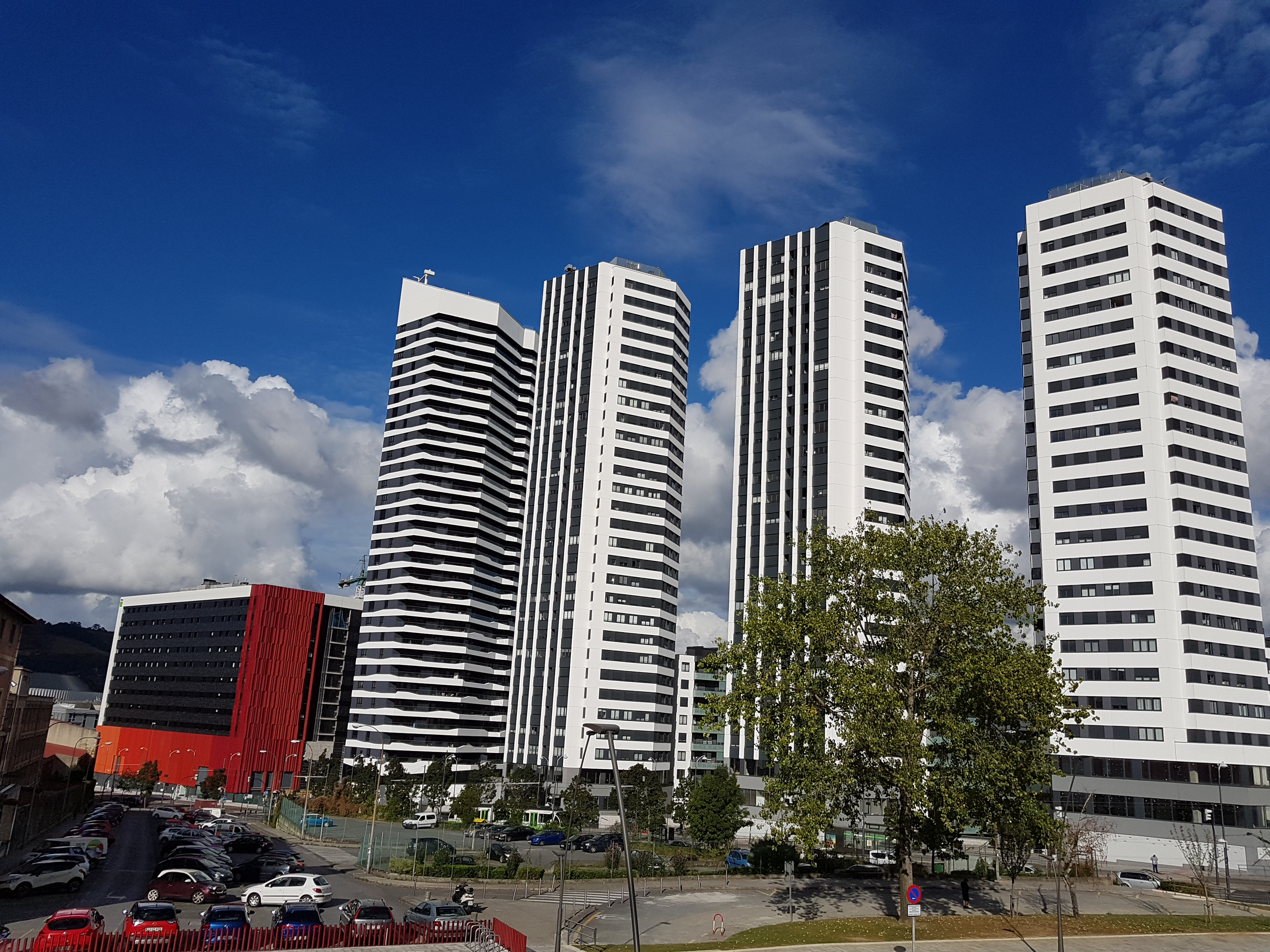
Garellano

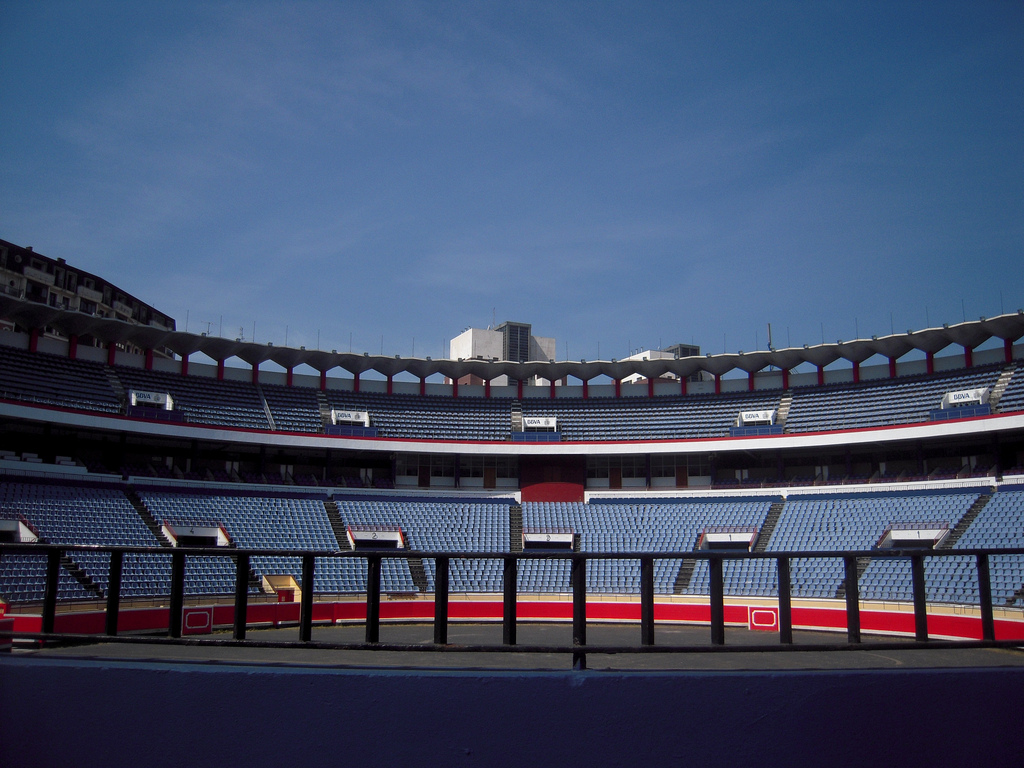
Plaza de Toros de Vista Alegre

== Notable people ==
- Amaya Uranga (1947), singer
- Joaquín Achúcarro (1932), pianist
- José Antonio Aguirre (1904–1960), football player, nationalist politician and first lehendakari of Basque Government
- Joaquín Almunia (1948), parliamentarian and minister of Spain and commissioner of the European Union
- Sabino Arana (1865–1903), politician and writer, Fundator of PNV
- Gabriel Aresti (1933–1975), promoter of poetry in euskara
- Juan Crisóstomo de Arriaga (1806–1826), composer, violinist and orchestra conductor
- Pedro Arrupe (1907–1991), Jesuit priest, Superior General of the Jesuits between 1965 and 1983
- Ramón Baglietto (1936–1980), politician
- Mariví Bilbao (1930–2013), actress
- Fito Cabrales (1966), singer, guitarist and composer
- Asier Etxeandia (1975), actor and singer
- Borja Fernández (born 1984), skater
- Diego de Gardoqui (1735–1798), politician and diplomat, first Spanish ambassador to the United States
- Ander Herrera (born 1989), professional footballer
- Álex de la Iglesia (1965), film director and scriptwriter
- Antonio Fernandez Saenz (1947), lawyer and human rights defender
- Asier Polo (1971), cellist
- Jon Kortajarena (1985), actor and international model
- Iñigo Lekue (born 1993), professional footballer
- Juan Martínez de Recalde (c. 1526–1588), admiral
- Rafael (Pichichi) Moreno (1892–1922), football player
- Anabel Ochoa (1955–2008), psychiatrist, communicologist, writer and actress of Los monólogos de la vagina
- Pedro Olea (1938), director, producer and film scriptwriter
- José Luis de Oriol (1877–1972), businessman, architect and Carlist politician
- Txus di Fellatio, Jesús María Hernández Gil (1970), lyricist, poet and Mägo de Oz folk metal drummer
- Miguel de Unamuno (1864–1936), writer and philosopher
- Izaskun Uranga (1950), singer
- Iñaki Williams (born 1994), professional footballer
- Secundino Zuazo (1887–1970), architect and urbanist
- Gorka Márquez (born 1990), Strictly Come Dancing professional dancer

== International relations ==
Bilbao is twinned with:

- Bordeaux, France
- Buenos Aires, Argentina
- Medellín, Colombia
- Monterrey, Mexico
- Pittsburgh, United States
- Qingdao, China
- Rosario, Argentina
- Sant Adrià de Besòs, Spain
- (Georgia (country)) Tbilisi, Georgia

== See also ==
- Abandoibarra
- Bilbao metropolitan area
- Greater Bilbao
- Lan Ekintza Bilbao
- Zorrotzaurre
- Neinor Homes

== Bibliography ==
- Beascoechea Madina, José María (1999). Bilbao en el espejo. La Bilbao más antigua 1300/1700. Bilbao. p. 194. ISBN 84-605-7844-5.
- Gómez Piñeiro, Francisco Javier; et al. (1979). Geografía de Euskal Herria: Vizcaya. San Sebastián. p. 291. ISBN 84-7407-068-6.
- Montero, Manuel (2000). Construcción histórica de la villa de Bilbao. San Sebastián. p. 142. ISBN 84-7148-384-X.
- Olaizola Elordi, Juanjo (2002). Bilboko tranbiak-Los tranvías de Bilbao (PDF). Bilbao. p. 177. ISBN 84-920629-8-3. Archived from the original (PDF) on 22 July 2009.
- Pérez Pérez, José Antonio (2001). Bilbao y sus barrios: una mirada desde la historia. Bilbao. ISBN 978-84-88714-94-7.
- Quiroga, Ramón; Marrodán, Miguel Ángel (2001). Bilbao: 700 años de historia. Abanto y Ciérvana. p. 115. ISBN 84-931494-3-8.
- Sánchez-Beaskoetxea, Javier (2006). La vuelta a Bilbao a través de sus montes y de su historia. Bilbao. p. 94. ISBN 978-84-88714-93-0.
- Tusell Gómez, Javier (2004). Bilbao a través de su Historia. Bilbao. p. 212. ISBN 84-95163-91-8.
- V.A. (October–December 1998). La Ría, una razón de ser. Bilbao. p. 147.
- V.A. (2000). El karst de Pagasarri. Bizkaiko Foru Aldundia = Diputación Foral de Bizkaia. ISBN 84-7752-319-3.
- García de la Torre; Francisco Javier (2009). Bilbao : arquitectura. GarcíadelaTorre, Arquitectos. ISBN 9788461328703.
