= San Francisco (Bilbao) =

Coordinates: 43°15′22″N 2°55′45″W

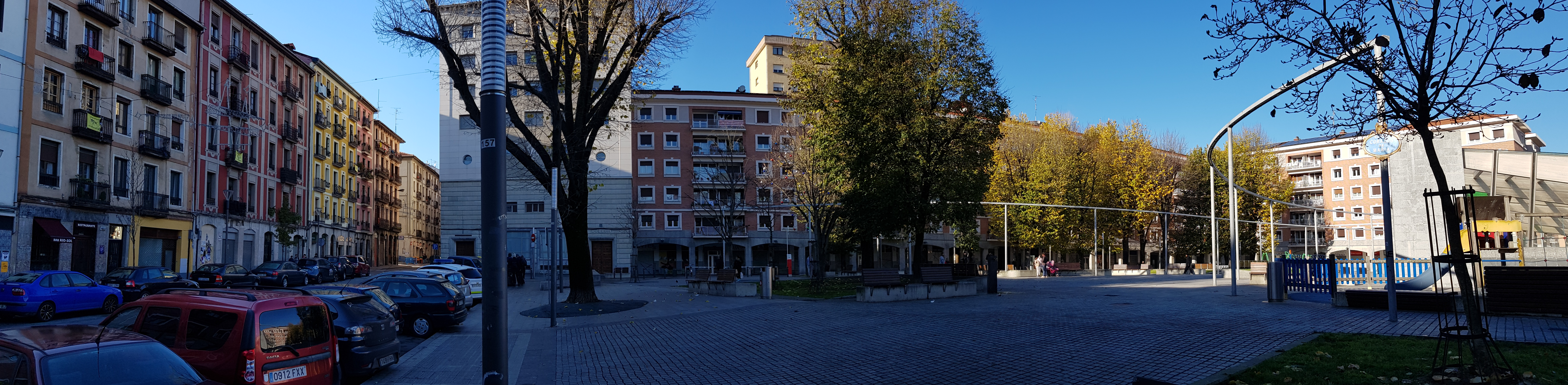
Corazón de María Square, San Francisco, Bilbao

San Francisco is a neighbourhood of Bilbao, in Biscay, Spain, and also one of the most run down areas. In the last decades, it has absorbed much of the immigration received by the city and has been integrated into the Ibaiondo district.

It is crossed by the San Francisco street, among other less important ones, and borders the following other neighbourhoods: Casco Viejo, Bilbao La Vieja, Zabala, Miribilla, Irala and Abando. The railway line and station separate San Francisco and Zabala from Abando, which is the centre of the city, and Irala, while the neighbourhood is separated from Casco Viejo by the estuary.

Two bridges cross the estuary San Francisco and Casco Viejo: La Merced bridge, in one direction only for vehicles, and El Perro Chico pedestrian bridge. The former church of La Merced has been converted into a public concert space known as Bilborrock. The neighbourhood also holds a museum of artistic reproductions.
