= Calle Urazurrutia =

Street in Bilbao, Spain

Urazurrutia Street
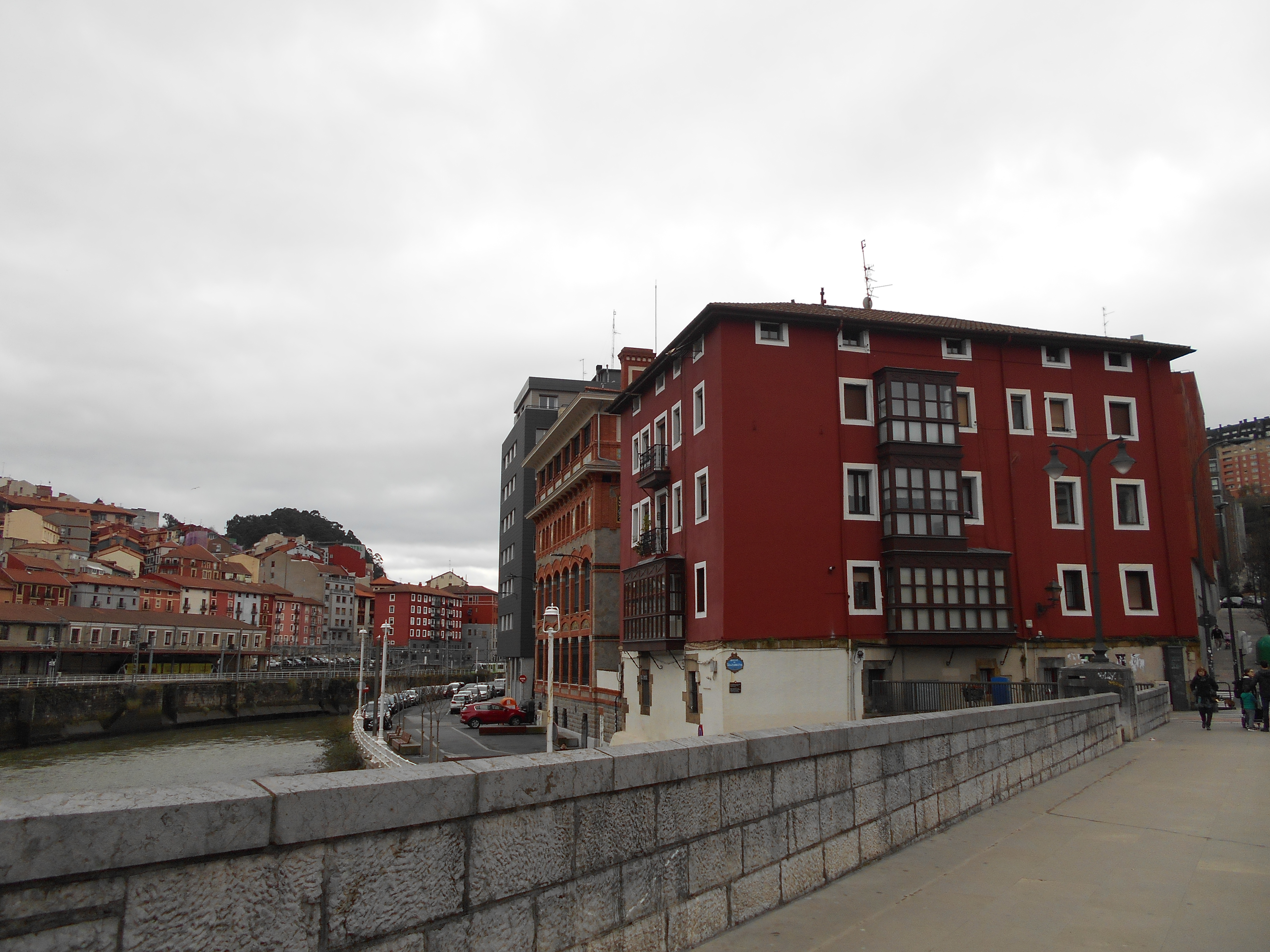
- Native name: Calle Urazurrutia (Spanish)
- Former name(s): Allende el Agua, Allende el Puente
- Namesake: Across the Sea in Basque

Calle Urazurrutia is a major street located in the barrio of Bilbao La Vieja, in Bilbao, Vizcaya.

== Extension ==
It starts at San Antón bridge, and finishes at Calle Zamácola, due to a decision the 4 October 1933. Calle Urazurrutia is part of the Ibaiondo district, district number 5. A dock with the same name also exists.

== Name origin ==
The name Urazurrutia is a name that can be roughly translated to: Across the Sea (Spanish: Allende el Agua), which defines the meaning, being that it is far away from the other part of Bilbao. It also was known as Allende la Puente, meaning Across the Bridge, referencing the previous meaning.

The names Urazurrutia and Allende la Puente were used for the streets until the 19th century, when the name Bilbao la Vieja predominated.

== History ==
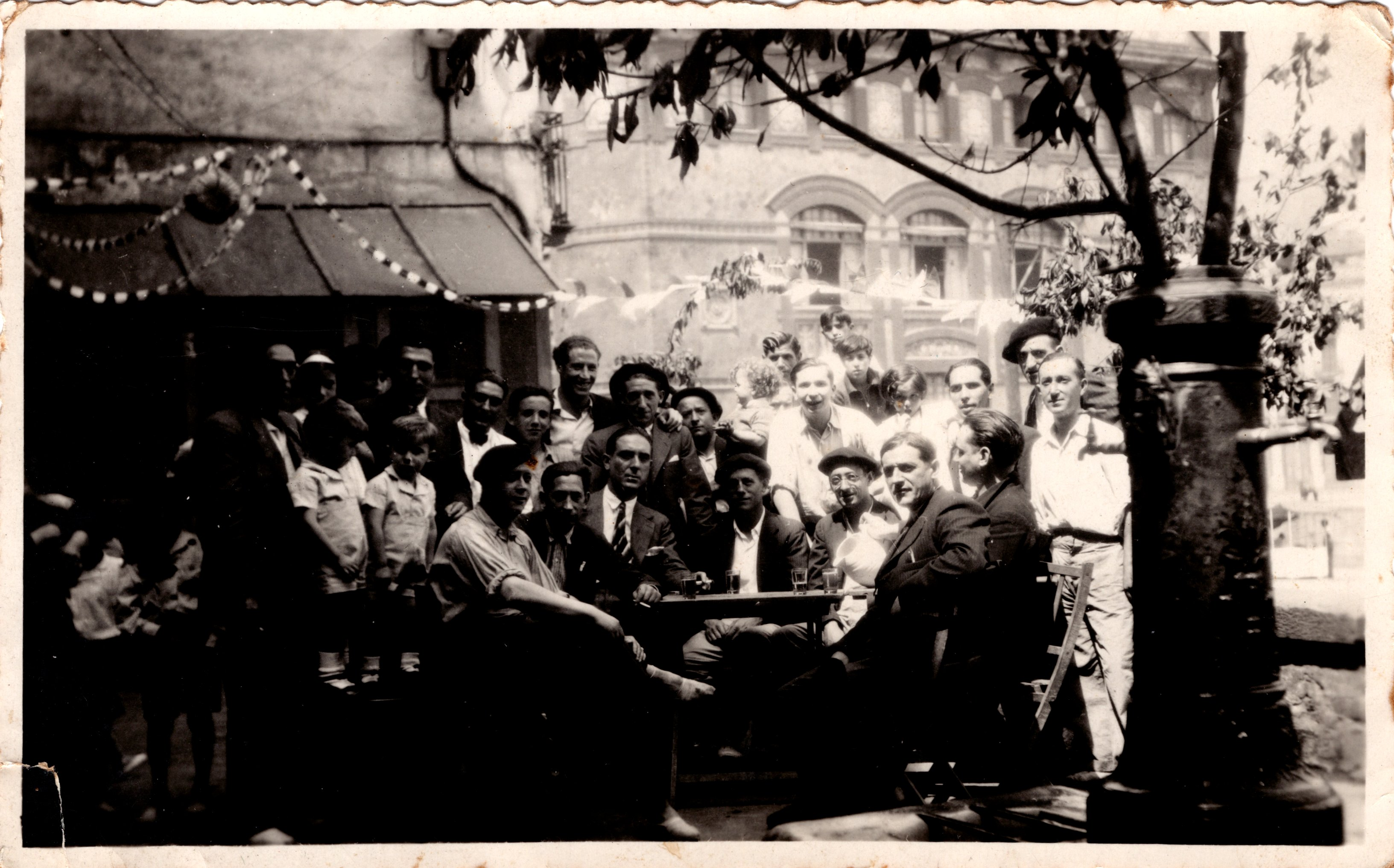
Urazurrutia Square at the start of the 20th century

Calle Urazurrutia stands in a vital point, where Bilbao was started.

Allende la Puente was a barrio of fishermen that historically had the treatment of a suburb where factories were placed due to their consideration as annoying and dangerous, prompting them to put them outside the walls of Bilbao. The Señorío prison, a building to store gunpowder, the Casa Galera, a limekiln, the cattle market and a landfill were all built in the barrio. In 1884 an important upgrade to the sewers was conducted.

The history of Calle Bilbao la Vieja, constructed in 1858, is very intertwined which Urazurrutia's.

== Notable buildings ==
=== Señorío prison ===
Between the years 1669 and 1671, the Lordship of Biscay built its prison in Urazurrutia, in loaned land from the Ayuntamiento of Bilbao. It was known as "Cárcel de la Señoría" and was in service until 1868, when the General Direction of Prisons ordered its demolition. It was substituted by the Zabalbide prison, later named Larrínaga.

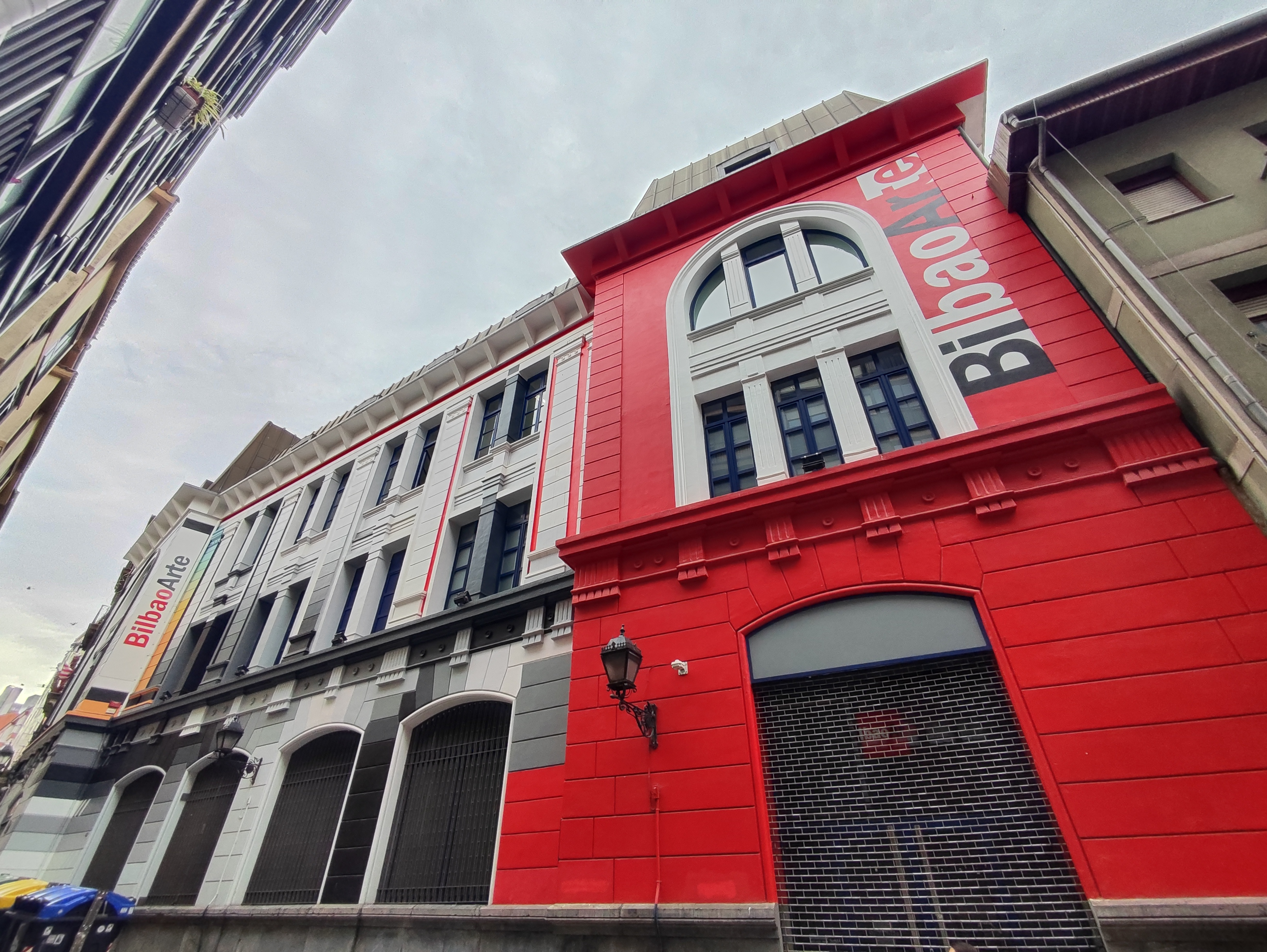
BilbaoArte

=== La Casa de la pólvora ===
32 Calle Urazurrutia, has been used for multiple purposes over time, having housed the gunpowder reserve, the women's prison, the school, and finally, the art gallery of BilbaoArt

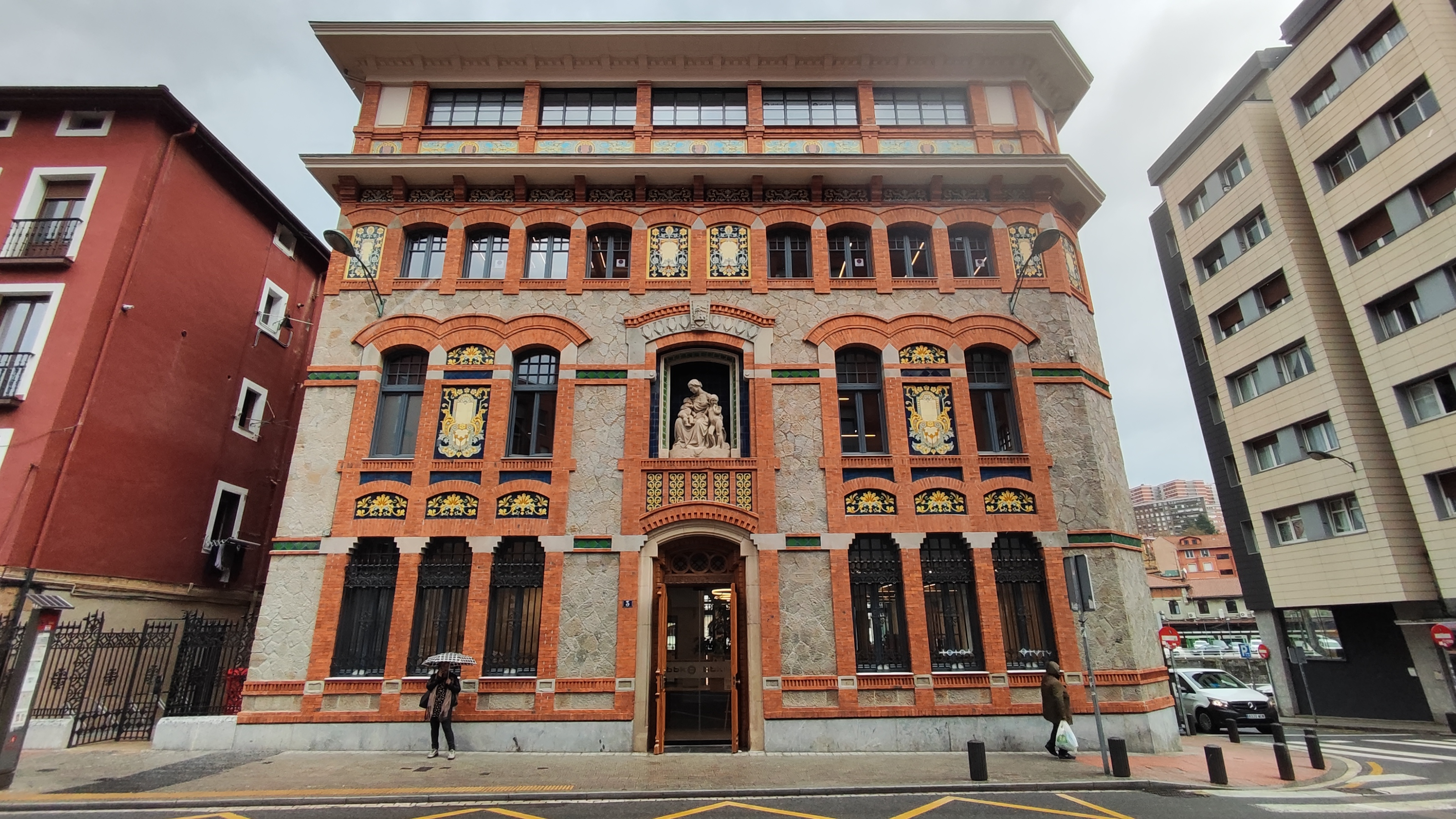
Casa Cuna de San Antonio

=== Casa cuna de San Antonio ===
The Ayuntamiento built on the street the Casa Cuna de San Antonio, which worked as a day care for children less than three. It was inaugurated the 7 January 1884, after Joaquín Rucoba reformed the building and gestored the Hijas de la Caridad de San Vicente de Paúl. Later, a new building was constructed, work of Ricardo Bastida, that was inaugurated the 25 July 1916. In 1929 the Caja de Ahorros Municipal de Bilbao bought the building.

In 2018, BBK, successor to the Caja de Ahorros and owner of the Casa Cuna, announced that it will cease to be daycare, which happened in 2021.

== Gallery ==
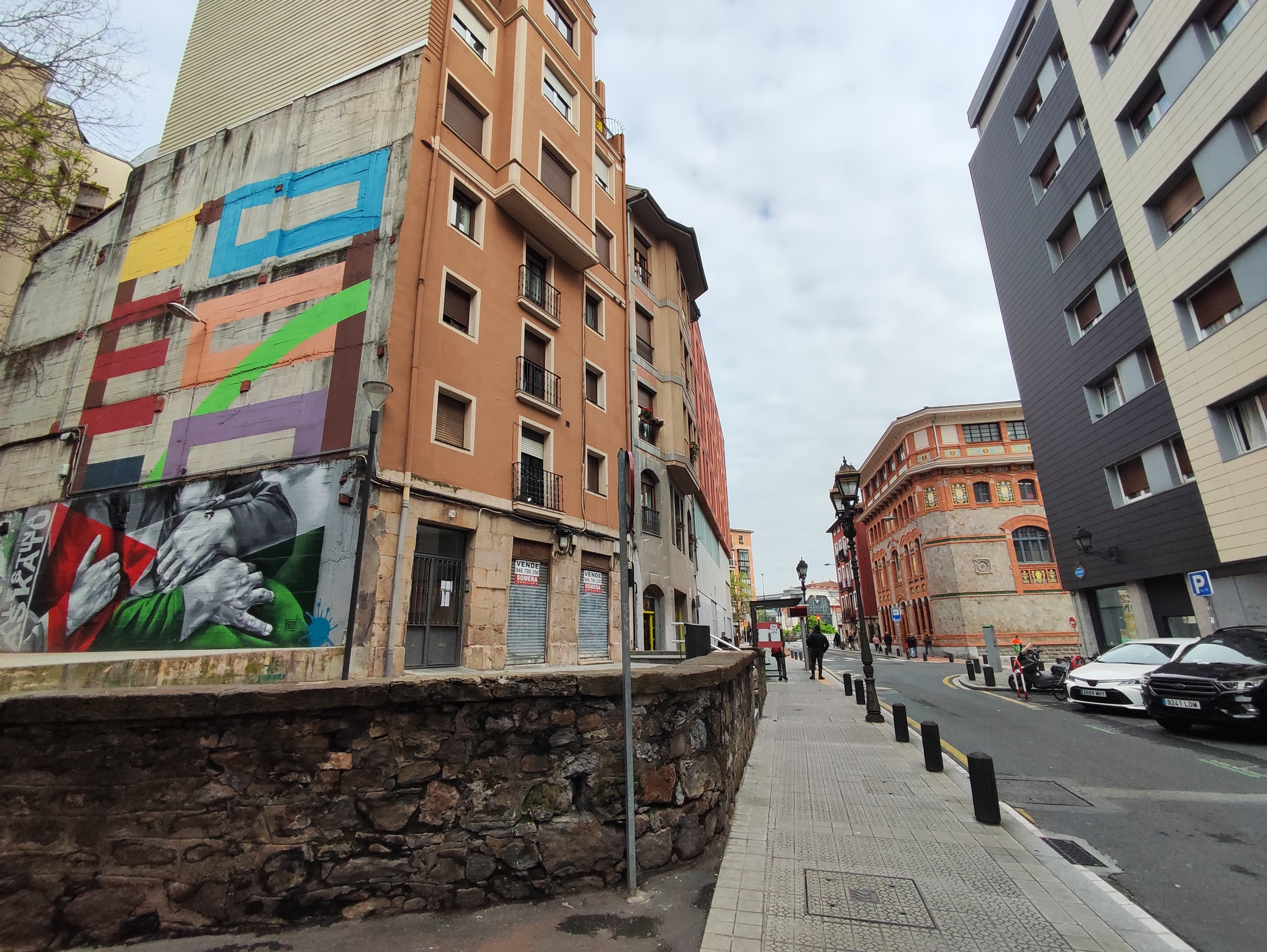
Murals

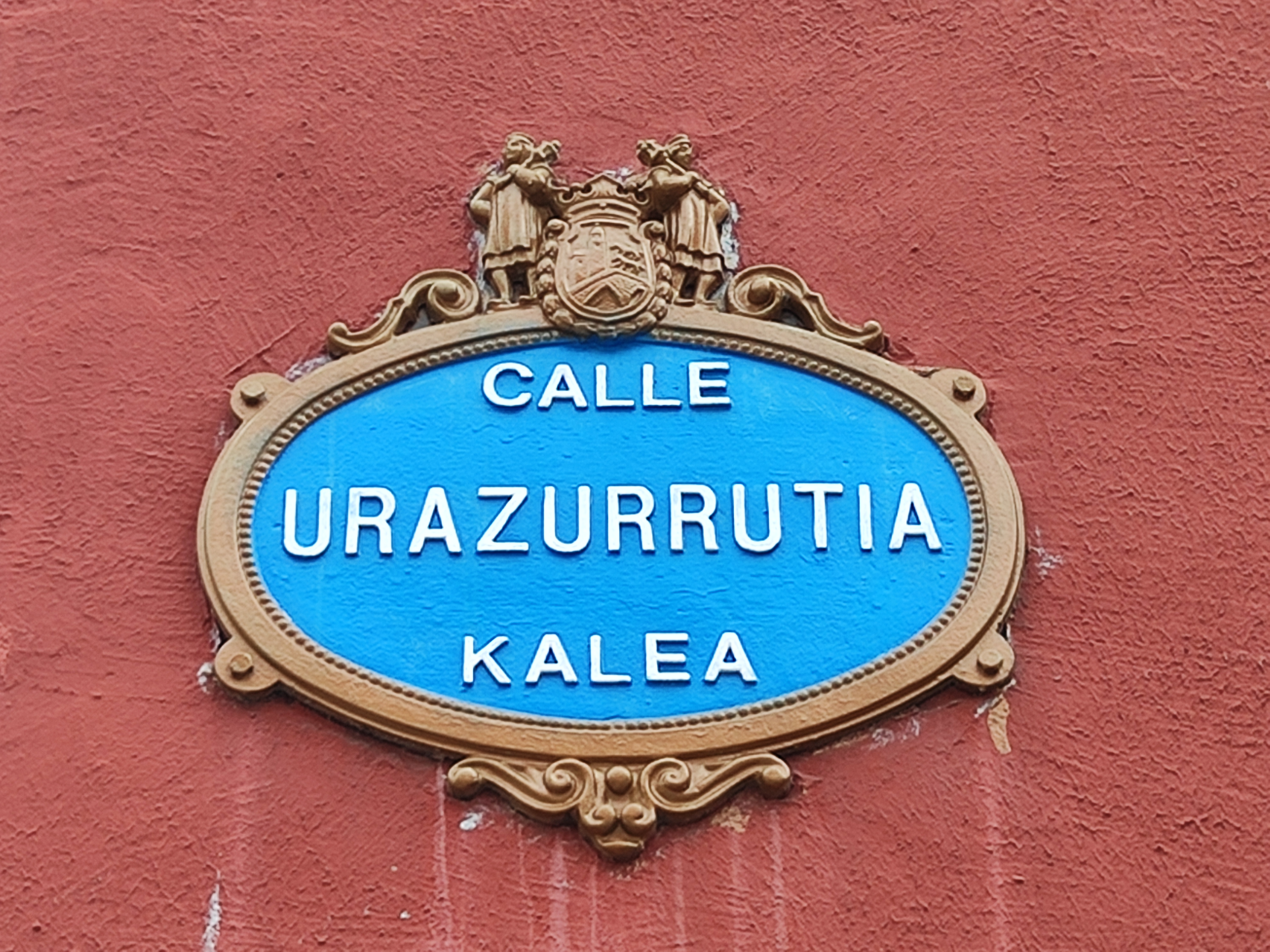
Sign

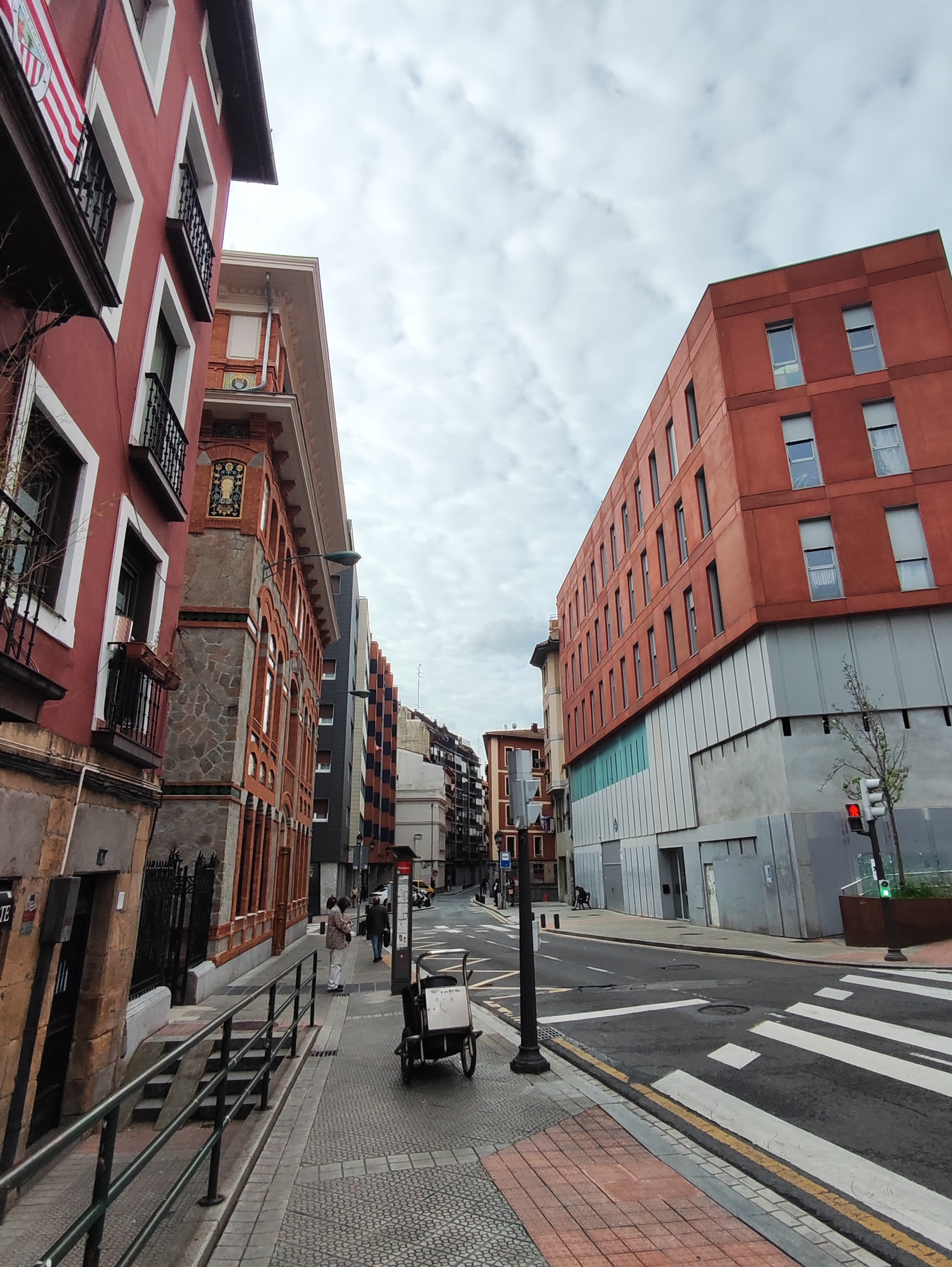

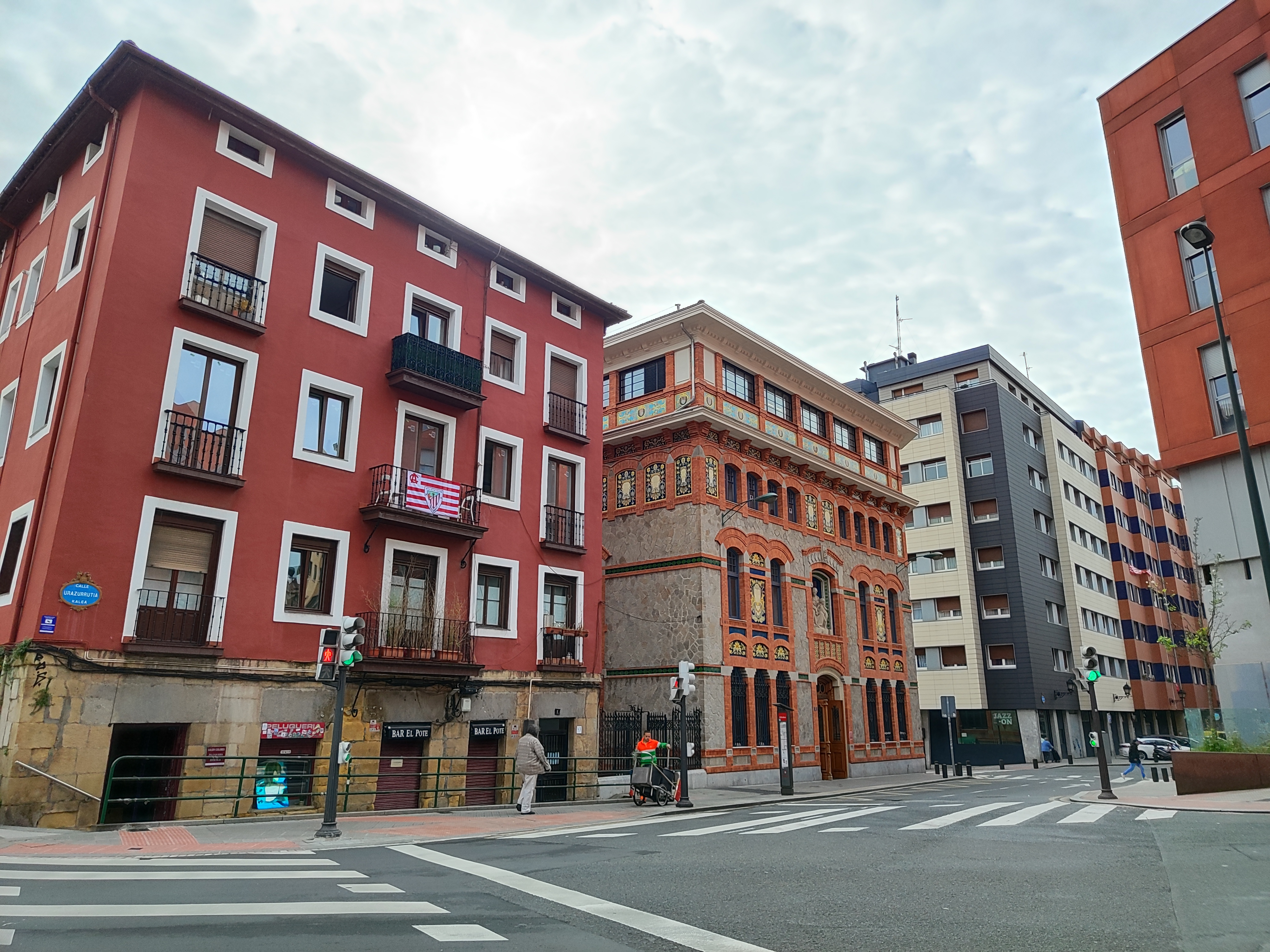

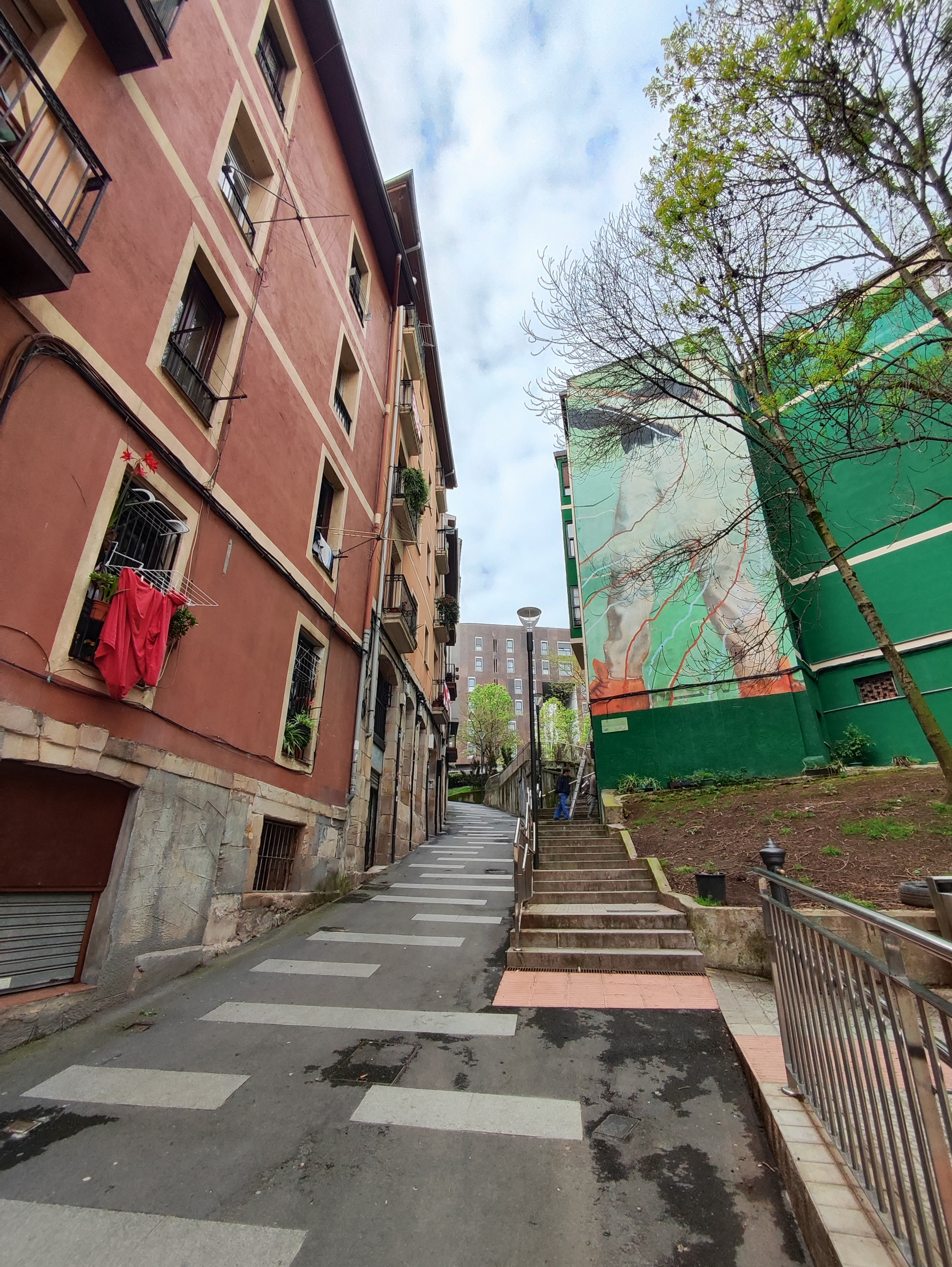
A different mural

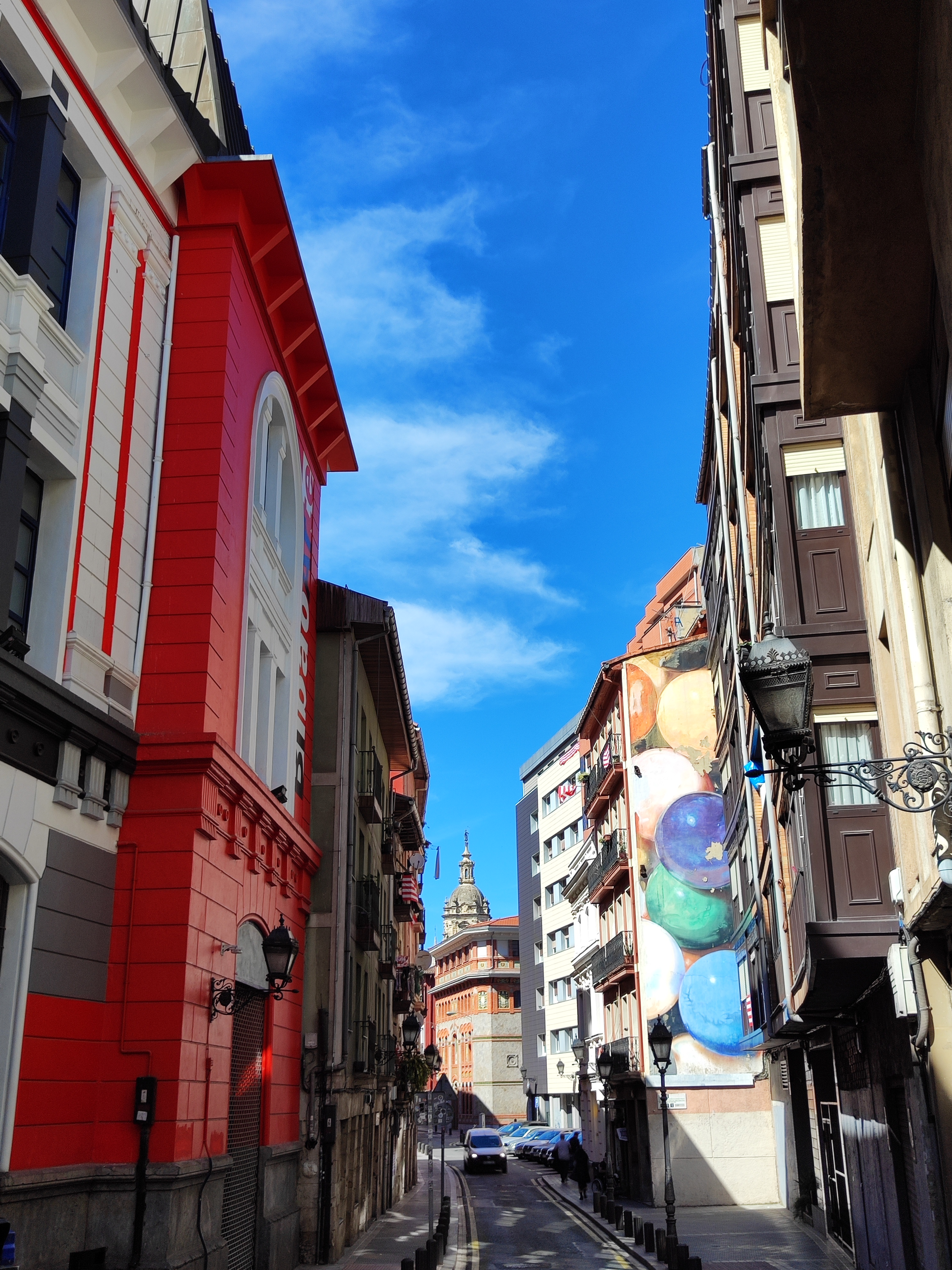
Street art

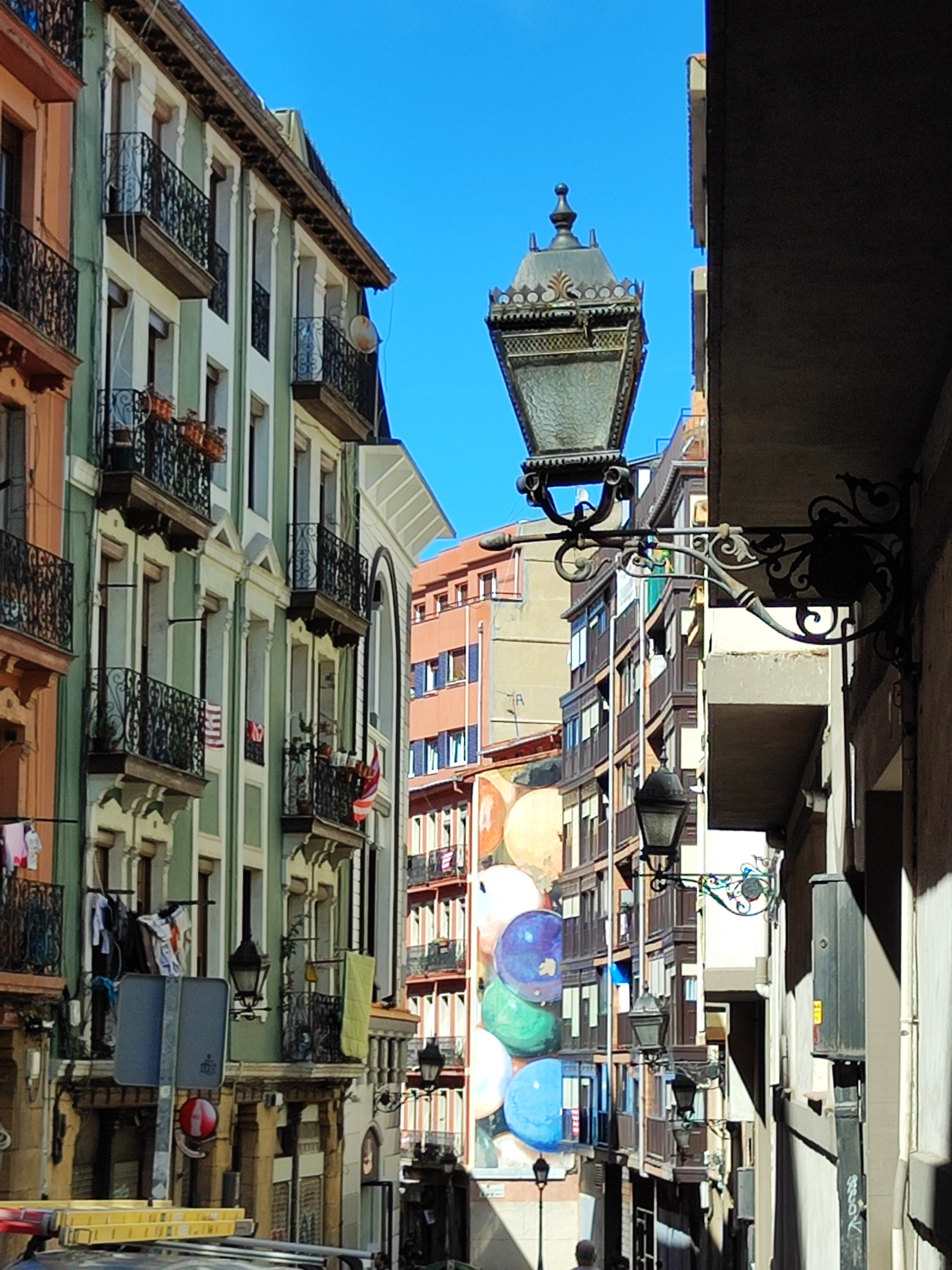
Same street art from another point of view

== Sources ==
- Salazar Arechalde, José Ignacio (2006). La otra orilla. Formación del barrio de San Francisco (1870-1900). Bilbao: Surbisa.
