= San Antón Bridge =

San Anton Bridge
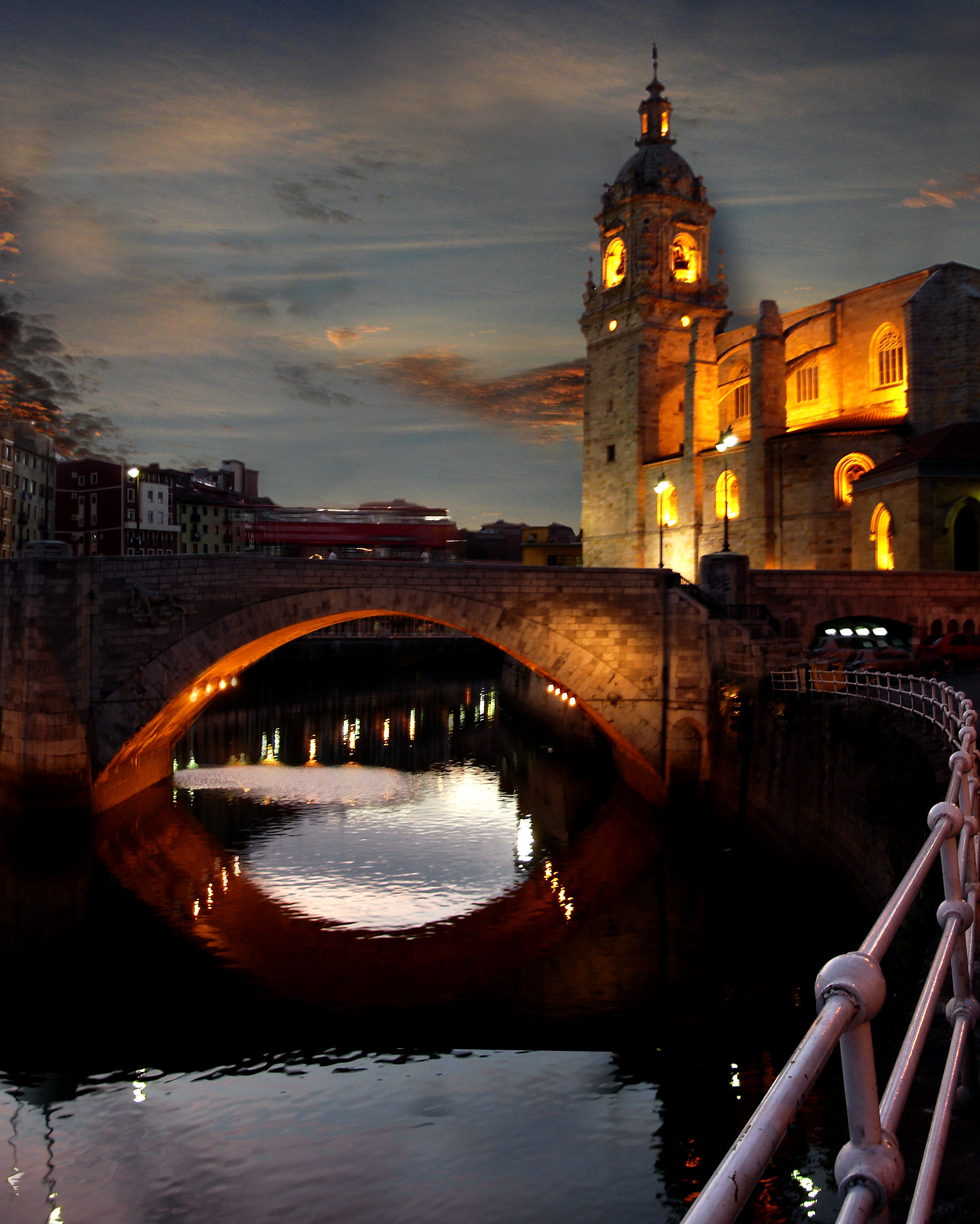
- Church of San Anton and bridge at night
- Coordinates: 43°15′17″N 2°55′23″W
- Carries: Motor vehicles Pedestrians and bicycles
- Crosses: Nervion River
- Locale: Bilbao
- Official name: Spanish: Puente de San Antón; Basque: San Antongo zubia
- Maintained by: Bilbao City Hall

Characteristics
- Design: Arch bridge
- No. of spans: Two

History
- Architect: Hoffmeyer
- Construction start: 1871
- Construction end: 1877

Location
- Interactive map of San Anton Bridge

The San Antón Bridge (Spanish: Puente de San Antón, Basque: San Antongo zubia) is an arch bridge in Bilbao, Spain. It spans the Estuary of Bilbao, linking the neighborhoods of Bilbao La Vieja and Casco Viejo. It is the oldest bridge in the city, with the original bridge being opened before 1318. At the time of its opening, and during centuries, it was the only bridge that crossed the river. It is located next to the Church of San Antón.

The San Antón Bridge is one of Bilbao's emblems and it is depicted on the city's coat of arms (as well as the crest of the local football club, Athletic Bilbao). Its origin is medieval. This bridge has a great historical importance, as the merchants were forced to use it to carry their products from Biscay to Castile as it was the only bridge that crossed the river.

Several floods have pulled down the bridge several times; to solve the problem the city hall decided to build a completely new one by the end of the 19th century. The new bridge was finished in 1880; the opening was delayed after it suffered damage on the Carlist Wars. It had to be reconstructed once more in 1937 after it was demolished on the Spanish Civil War. The 1937 reconstruction was the last one and the current bridge is from that time.
