= Ispizua =

Ispizua is a Spanish surname. Notable people with the surname include:

- Pedro Ispizua (1895–1976), Spanish architect
- José Luis Ispizua (1908–1996), Spanish footballer
- Rubén Oarbeascoa Ispizua (born 1975), Spanish professional cyclist
