= Church of Saint Anthony the Great =

Catholic church located in Bilbao, Spain

Coordinates: 43°15′18″N 2°55′24″W

Church of San Antón San Anton eliza
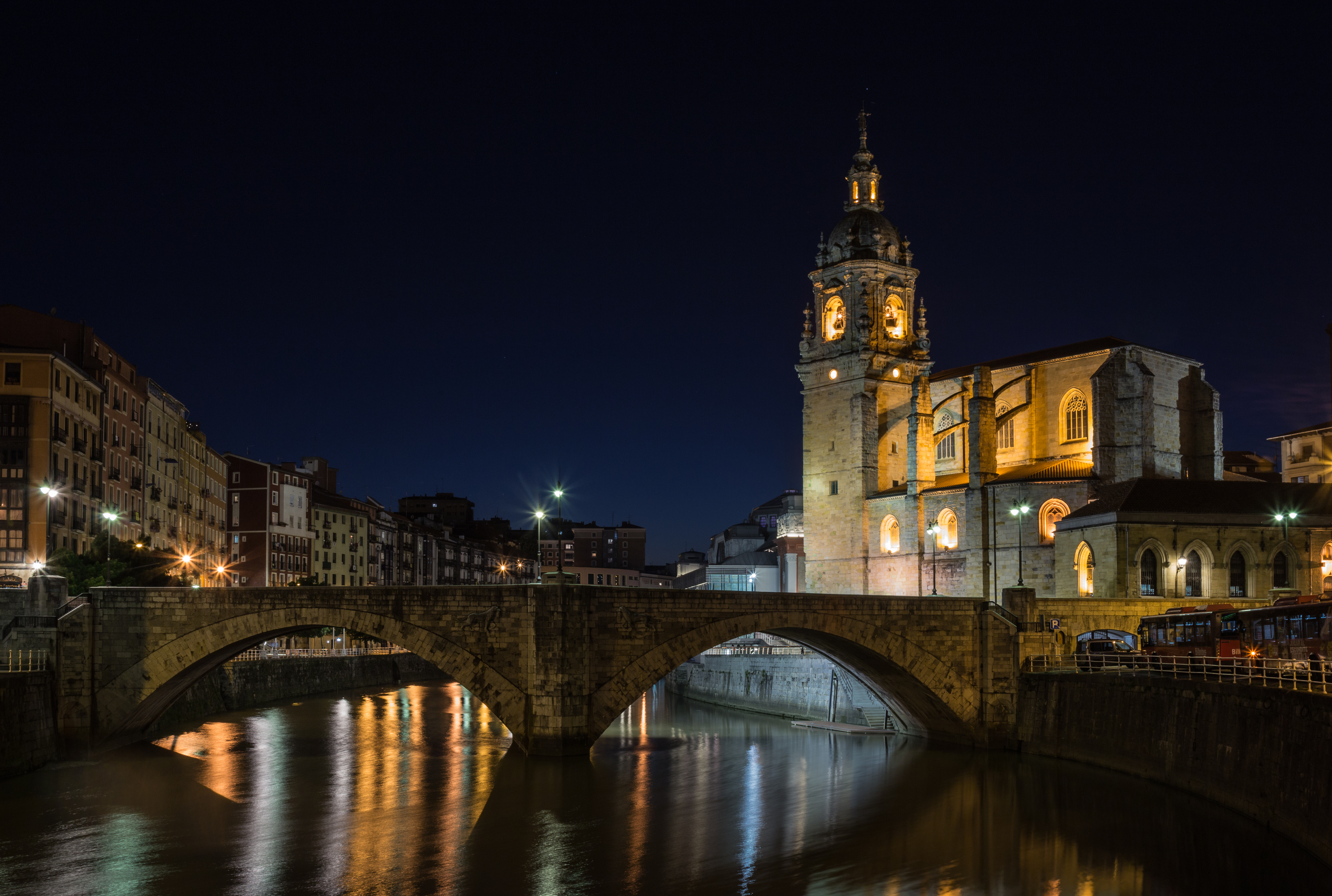

Religion
- Affiliation: Roman Catholic
- Province: Biscay

Location
- Location: Bilbao, Basque Country, Spain
- Interactive map of Church of San Antón; San Anton eliza

Architecture
- Type: Church
- Style: Gothic, Renaissance, Baroque
- Groundbreaking: 15th century
- Completed: 1510

The Church of San Antón is a Catholic church located in the Old Town neighbourhood of Bilbao, Spain. It is dedicated to Anthony the Great, known as San Antón in Spanish. It is featured, along with the San Antón Bridge, in the city's coat of arms. The estuary of Bilbao flows next to it.

== Introduction ==
Saint Anthony's church is an example of the Gothic style of church architecture, popular in the 15th and 16th centuries. Despite reconstruction it remains possible to observe some Gothic features as the rib vaults and the pointed arches.

== History ==
The church was built at the end of the 15th century on a plot where there had been a warehouse for three hundred years. It is considered an asset of cultural interest since 17 July 1984, in the category "National Historic-Artistic Monument".

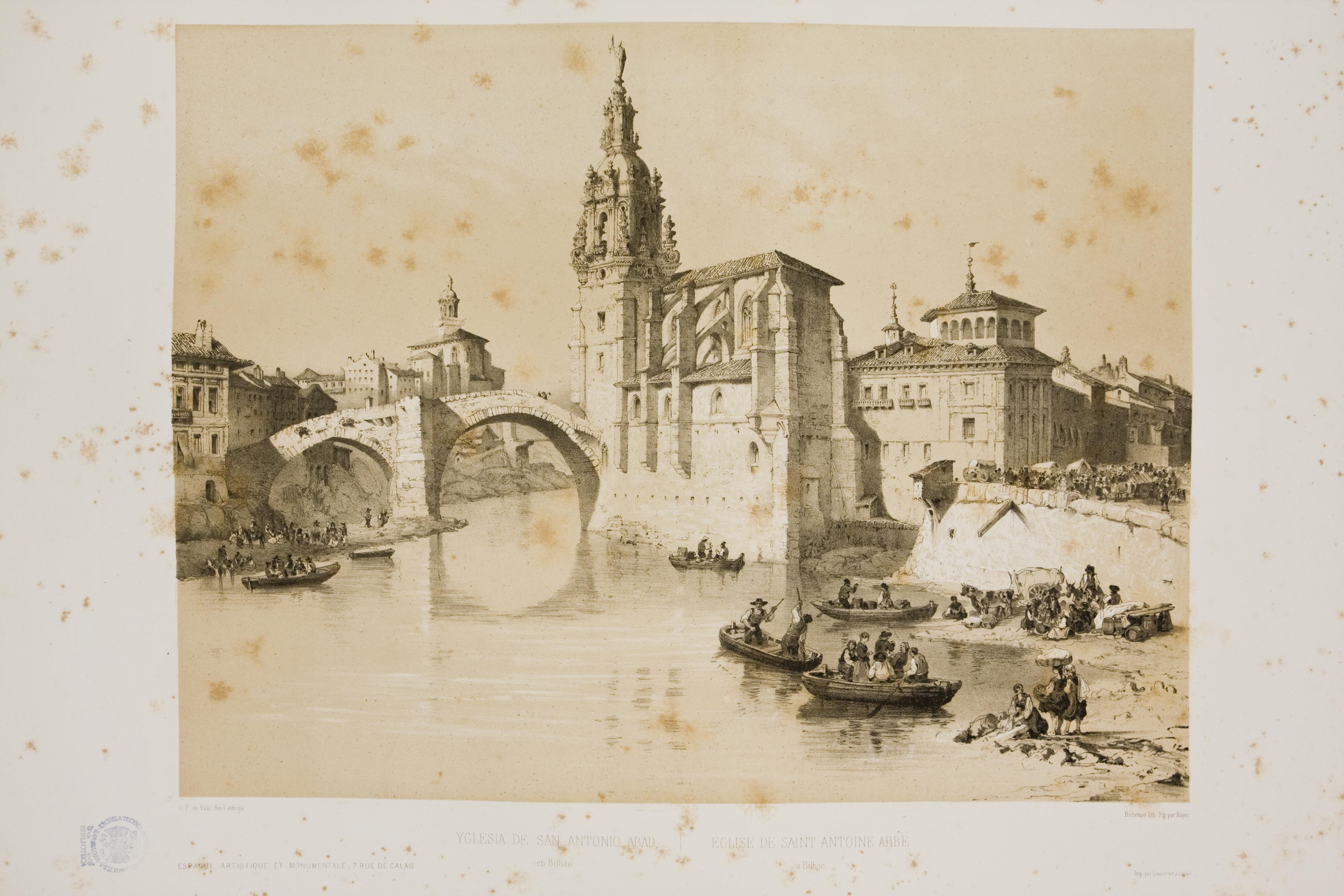
Church of San Anton by painters Jenaro Pérez Villaamil and Bichebois in 1850, published in the work España artística y monumental.

In 1300 Diego López de Haro gave the municipal charter. The river and the plot were incorporated to the new village called Bilbao. Some claim that in 1334 Alfonso XI of Castile ordered to build a fortress and wall that were used like a dike against the flood. A wall was discovered in 2002 by an archaeological excavation but the claim is still inconclusive.

Some time later this two buildings were replaced by one church dedicated to Saint Anthony the Great. The church was consecrated in 1433, at that point the church had only the single nave with a rectangular floor and a vaulted roof. Now. the old foundations of that church can be seen near the old wall of Bilbao.

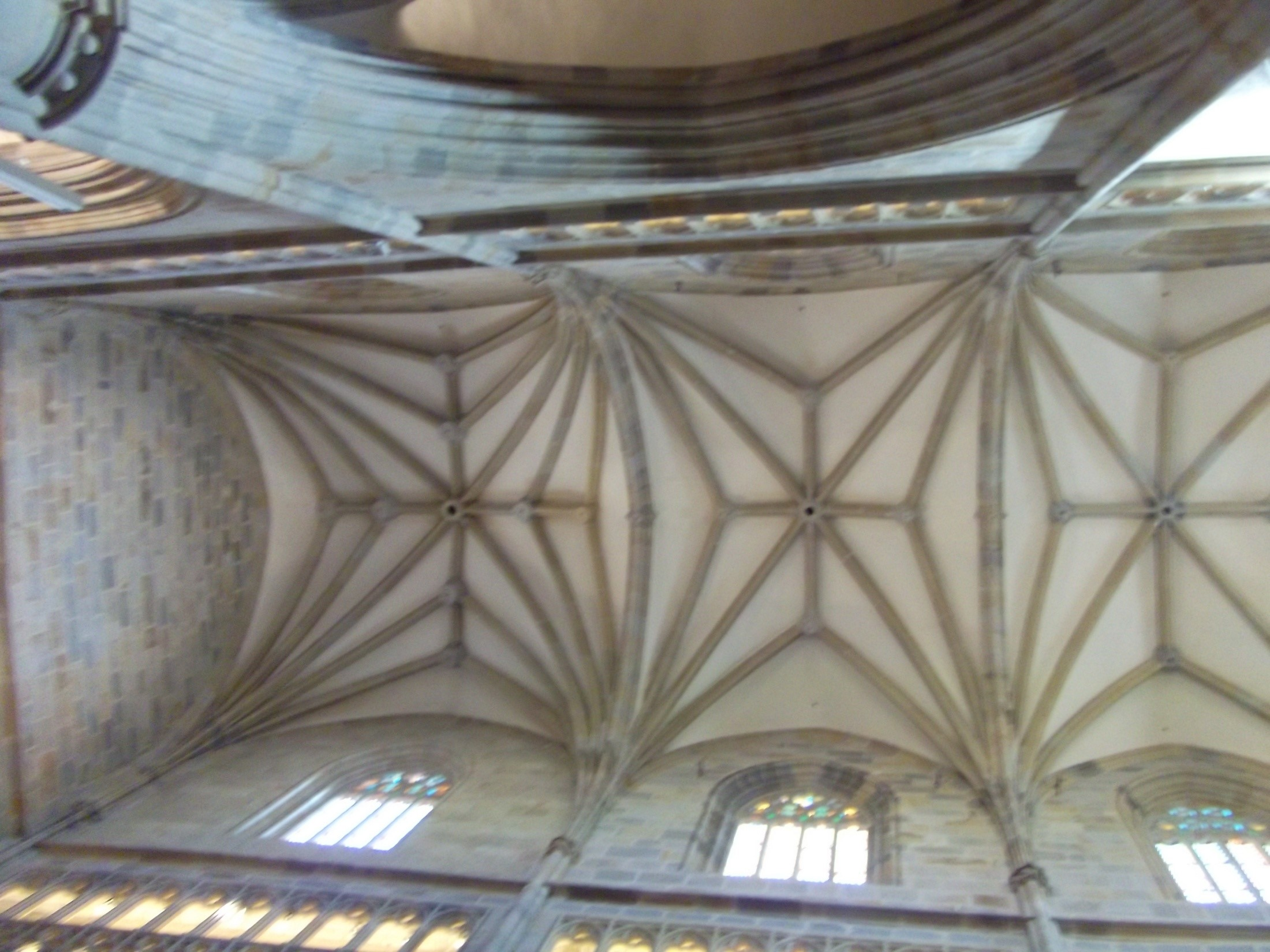
Vaults of Church of San Anton

In 1478, a new construction project began to enlarge the church, as the congregation was growing. This enlargement, in Gothic style, was finished in the first part of the 16th century.

Throughout history this church has suffered damage and was closed twice. The main source of damage was flooding from the Nervión river. The last flood was in 1983 and resulted in furniture, drag doors and railings inside the church being destroyed.

The church has also suffered damage through bombing and fire during war, especially during the Carlist war. During this war, the church was forced to close as it was used for military logistics. The church was forced to close for a second time in 1881, owing to the tumbledown state of the church. Restoration work undertaken by Sabino Goikoetxea changed much of the original design of the church.

== Gothic art in Biscay ==
Gothic art was created in France during the 13th century, but it wasn't until the 14th century when it was introduced in Biscay, due to the region's poverty. In the 14th century the population and the economy grew, carrying Gothic art and architecture into Biscay. Throughout Spain, Gothic architecture became common half century later than in France. As the French influence entered by Navarre, it avoided the Basque Country, meaning that the Gothic style was common in Biscay even later than much of Spain. Even then, there are few large Gothic projects in the region, with Santiago's cathedral in Bilbao or Andra Mari of Lekeitio as notable exceptions.

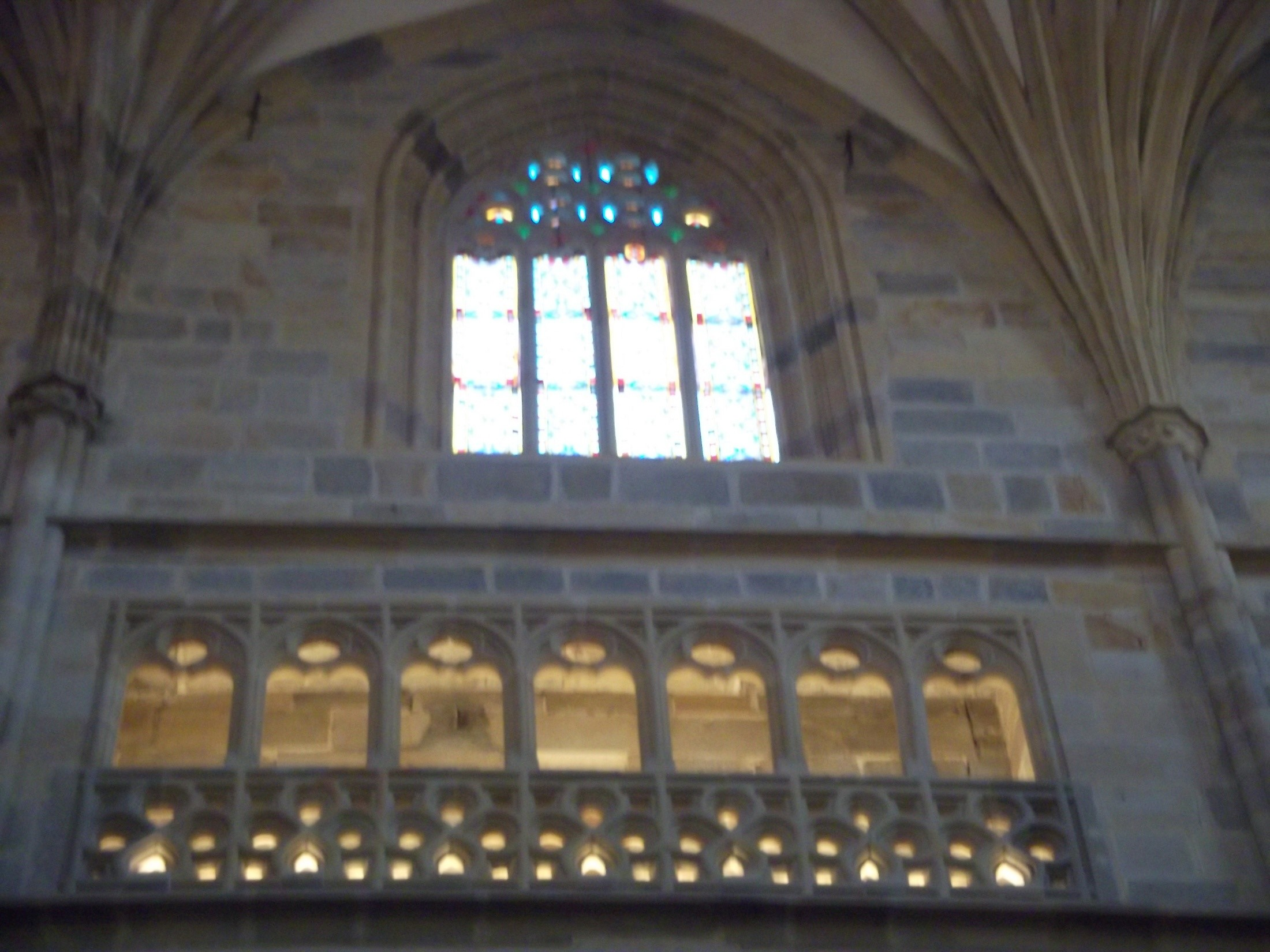
Windows of San Anton

Most of the buildings in the Gothic style were begun in the 14th century, but only Santiago's cathedral was ended then. The rest were consecrated between the 15th and 16th centuries.

Buildings in 'Biscay Gothic' lost the spirit of the International Gothic: they were not monumental buildings with large windows creating striking visual displays, but smaller buildings, becoming a characteristic of the local Gothic style.

Andra Mari of Guernica, Getxo, Orduña, Gueñes, Erandio, Galdakao, Portugalete and Lekeitio, Santa Eufemia of Bermeo, Santiago's Cathedral, Basilica of Begoña, San Vicente and San Anton of Bilbao and San Severino of Balmaseda have to be named as important buildings of the Gothic of Biscay.

== Chapels of San Antón ==
The Church of San Antón contains three chapels:

=== Chapel of Provost ===
This is the first and widest chapels that the church. Built in 1530 this chapel is an example of the late Gothic style which can be seen in other nearby construction like Begoña, La encarnación, San Vicente of Abando and San Pedro of Deusto. There is a large ogival arch at the entrance of the chapel. This arch is closed by a grille that was forged in Bilbao. At the top of the entrance the coat of arms of the chapel's founders (the Lezama-Leguizamón family) are displayed. Historically, was a passageway that linked this chapel and Lezama-Leguizamón family's tower house. There is a stained glass window located in the front wall.

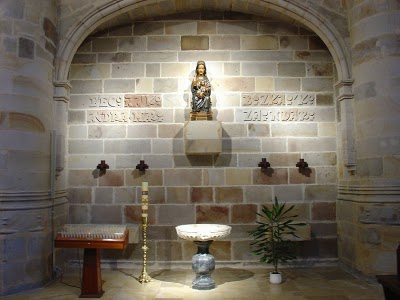
Chapel of the church of San Antón, Bilbao.

The chapel held two altarpieces. One of the altarpieces is dedicated to Santa Ana and the other is dedicated to Virgen de la Consolación. At present the chapel contains an altar that contains a wood carved sculpture of Inmaculada and some paintings.

There is also a silver lamp with the following inscription carved on it: "Esta lámpara dieron a su capilla de Santa Ana, Doña María de Leguizamón y Don Domingo de Isasi-Leguizamón. 1621".

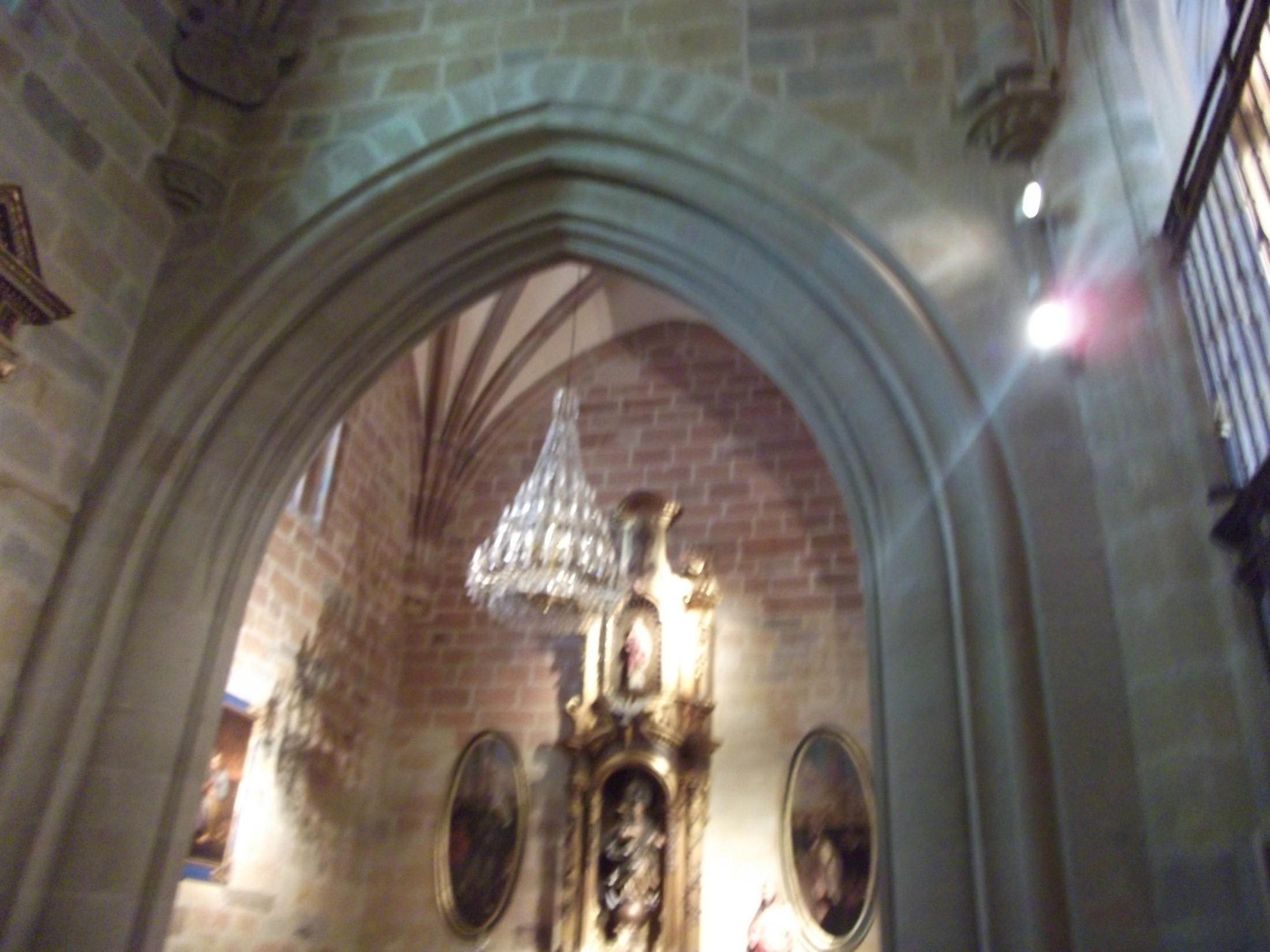
Arch that unites two chapels of San Antón's church, Bilbao.

=== Chapel of Piety ===
The Chapel of Piety is smaller than the Chapel of Provost but bigger than the Chapel of San Roque. It possesses similar attributes of those present in the Chapel of Provost, having a Gothic structure in the entrance arch, rib vault on the ceilings and stained glass windows.

The grille closing this chapel is older than the grille closing the Chapel of Provost. The top part of this grille includes the coat of arms of the Recalde family along with details of the Passion.

The intermediate frieze contains the following inscription written in Latin: "O Mater Dei, memento mei Iesu". It could be translated as "Oh mother of god, remember us before Jesus".

In 1919 the Chapel of Provost and the Chapel of Piety were united with a Gothic arch to enlarge the communion rail.

=== Chapel of San Roque ===
This is the smallest chapel out of the three that the church of San Anton possess. This chapel is composed by a rib vault and a small blinded Gothic arch in the right wall. This was the original entrance to the church.

When the new main front was built the Ibiceta family, which had their family sepulchre in the chapel, decided to transform it to an artistic mausoleum with pious sculptures and decorative elements. The chapel contains a round-headed arch sustained by Corinthians columns. The chapel contains a sculpture of San Roque above the sepulchre and the sculptures of Saint Lucy and Saint Sebastian flanking it.

== Façade of Renaissance ==
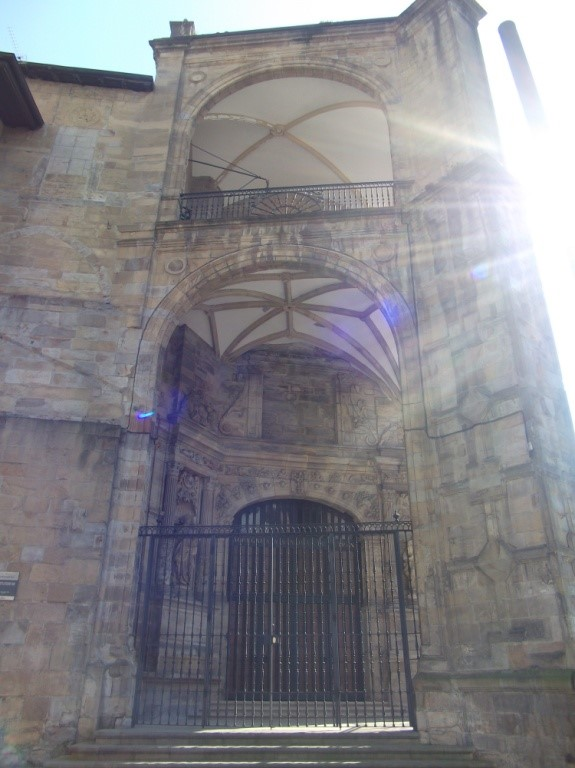
Façade of Renaissance in San Anton of Bilbao.

The church contains a façade in the 16th-century Renaissance style, not of Gothic style of the rest of the building. This is owing to the repeated reconstructions to the church, with each reconstruction contributing new features characteristic of that epoch.

The earliest identifiable style is neither Renaissance nor Gothic - the entry arches are round arches and are typical of the Romanesque style; and at the door consists of another type of arch used at the end of the 15th century. The most visible Gothic element are the rib vaults throughout the ceiling of the nave.

The Renaissance façade was built in the year 1548 to generous proportions and with rich decoration characteristic of the Renaissance. Around the arches there are small sculptures of low relief, with the form of heads, symbol of the anthropocentrism that dominated the Renaissance. The great majority of the heads contain wings of angels behind them; and middle these, in the central keystone, there is a larger sculpture in the form of a shield with the year 1548 recorded in it, as a signature of the builder.

On either side of the door there are Corinthian columns, typical of the Renaissance style. These are smaller in comparison with other buildings, but they contain all the essence of the syle: a Corinthian capital with its rectangular annulet and abacus and its acanthus' leaves, some coiled forming "caulículos". The shaft is in a grooved style and at the end of the shaft and the foot there are sculptural drawings of plants and human representations.

The façade also contains two niches, one to each side of the door, which until 1892 were empty. In reconstruction in that year, the sculptures of Saint Peter and Saint Paul were erected. The niches contain scallops, which are the space of the niche itself, with representations that venerate what is inside the niche. In this case we also find in the scallop two little angels holding a medallion with the head of another human being. All these elements (niches, angels, scallops, medallions, and Corinthian columns) are representative elements of the Renaissance style of the 15th and 16th centuries.

== Belfry Tower ==
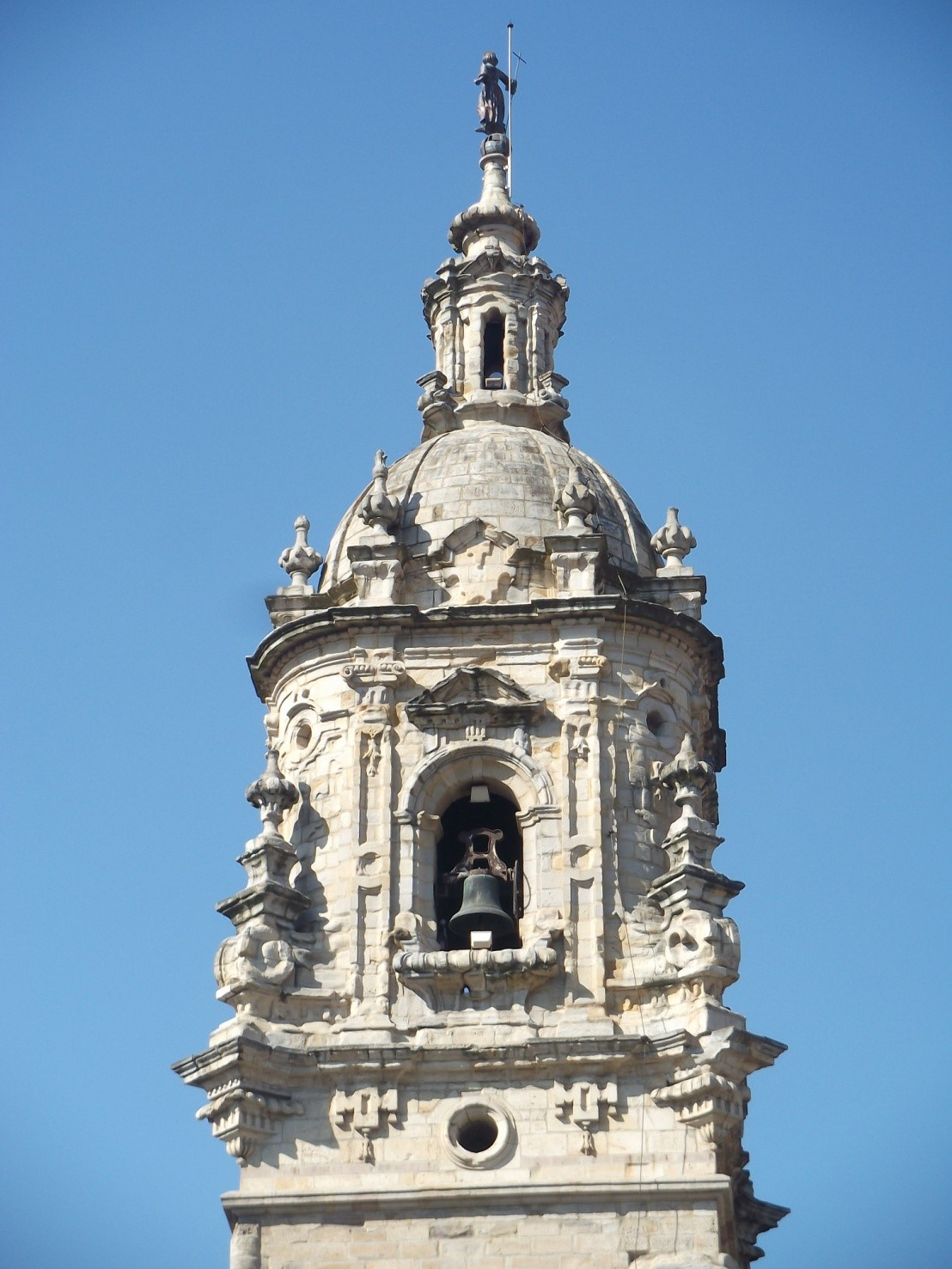
Belfry Tower

In 1774 the construction of the present Belfry Tower was begun by Gabriel de Capelastegui, replacing an earlier structure. The tower has a quadrangular body that rises near the central roof. Above it is the belfry crowned by a dome and a lantern, and with auctions in the weathercock. It has a shining Baroque dieciochesco style, being one of the best examples of the whole Basque Country. The weathercock dates back to 1775, specifically it was made on 7 December 1775.

The belfry can be reached via 106 limestone stairs and its banister, which has a notable geometric precision. From the base to the lantern there are 32 wooden steps, which remain in need of repair. The outside watch was located in this lantern, with bronze sphere and golden numbers, it was situated between the two coats of arms made of bronze in the consulate balcony, in front of the Mercado de la Ribera.

The bell, substituted the one before, The Circumcision of the Lord, which fell on 29 June 1779. The actual one has the following inscription: "IHS. San Antonio Abad. Ora pro nobis, Antonio de la Hoza me Hizo. 1829."

The last contributions date from 1902: the new portico in front of the Ronda street, the new sacristy and the large parroquial dependences. The construction of the portico and the frontages which run to the bridge were designed by the architect Enrique Epalza, in the Isabelline Gothic style, mirroring other styles already present in the church.
