= Plaza Nueva, Bilbao =

Square in Bilbao

Coordinates: 43.2591°N 2.9227°W

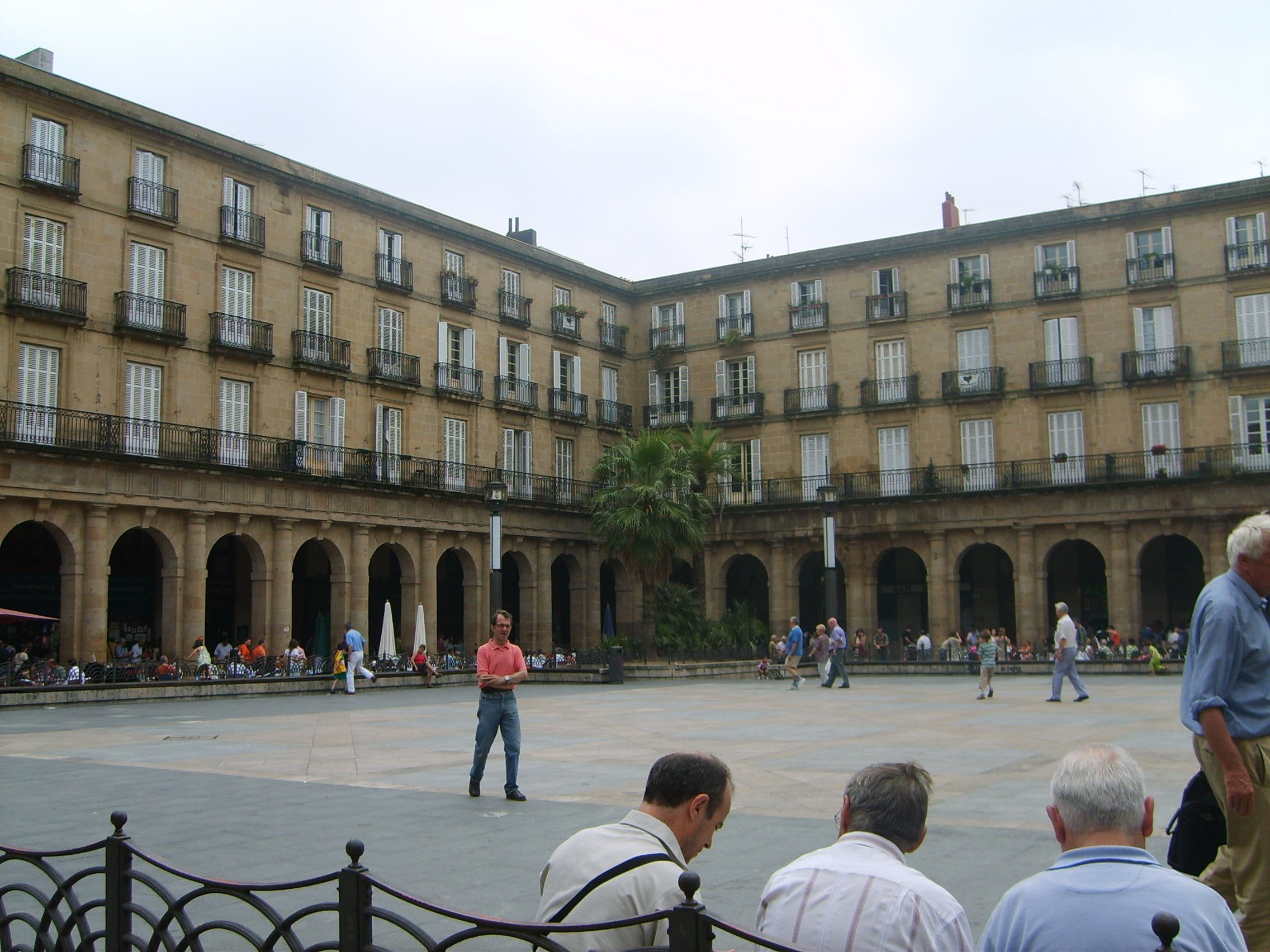
Plaza Nueva of Bilbao

The Plaza Nueva or Plaza Barria ('New Square') of Bilbao is a monumental square of neoclassical style, designed in 1821 and inaugurated in 1851. Its name comes from the previously existing Plaza Vieja or Old Square in the place where the Ribera Market was built. The square is enclosed by arcaded buildings and accessed by arches known as cuevas (caves).

The main building was the site of the Biscay government, until a new palace was built in 1890. The place is now the site of Euskaltzaindia, the Royal Academy of the Basque Language.

The arches host many traditional taverns and restaurants, some of the most ancient and typical of the city, and some gift and souvenir shops.

Each Sunday, the square provides space for a traditional flea market where ancient books, coins, stamps, birds and flowers are sold.

The square is used often for folk demonstrations, festivals and concerts. The Grand Slam Masters Final, one of the strongest chess tournaments in the world, was held in a glass structure on Plaza Nueva in 2008 and 2009.

Since 2008, the Bilbao City Council acts as a free ISP providing free Internet access via Wi-Fi in the square.
