= Pedro Ispizua =

Spanish architect (1895–1976)

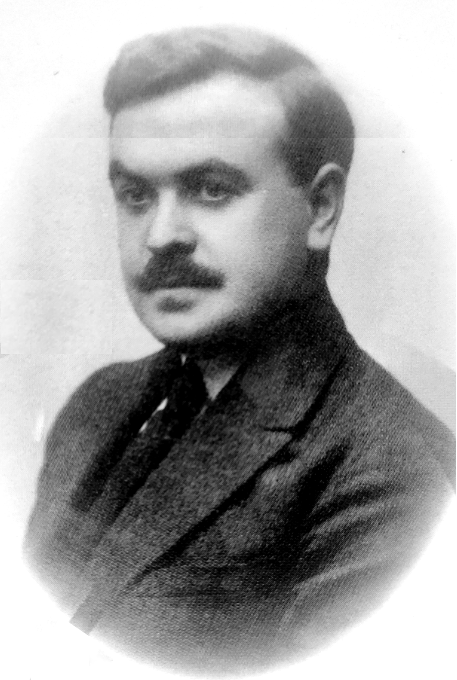
- Born: Pedro Ispizua Susunaga; 29 April 1895; Bermeo, Biscay, Spain
- Died: 10 January 1976 (aged 80); Bilbao, Spain
- Citizenship: Spanish
- Occupation: Architect
- Known for: Work at Mercado de la Ribera and Colegio de Santiago Apóstol

Pedro Ispizua Susunaga (29 April 1895 – 10 January 1976) was a Spanish architect who worked as the municipal architect of Bilbao from 1920 until the outbreak of the Spanish Civil War, after which he worked exclusively as a liberal professional. Throughout his career, he designed several emblematic buildings in Bilbao and Biscay, most notably Mercado de la Ribera, Club Deportivo de Bilbao, and the Colegio de Santiago Apóstol.

== Works ==
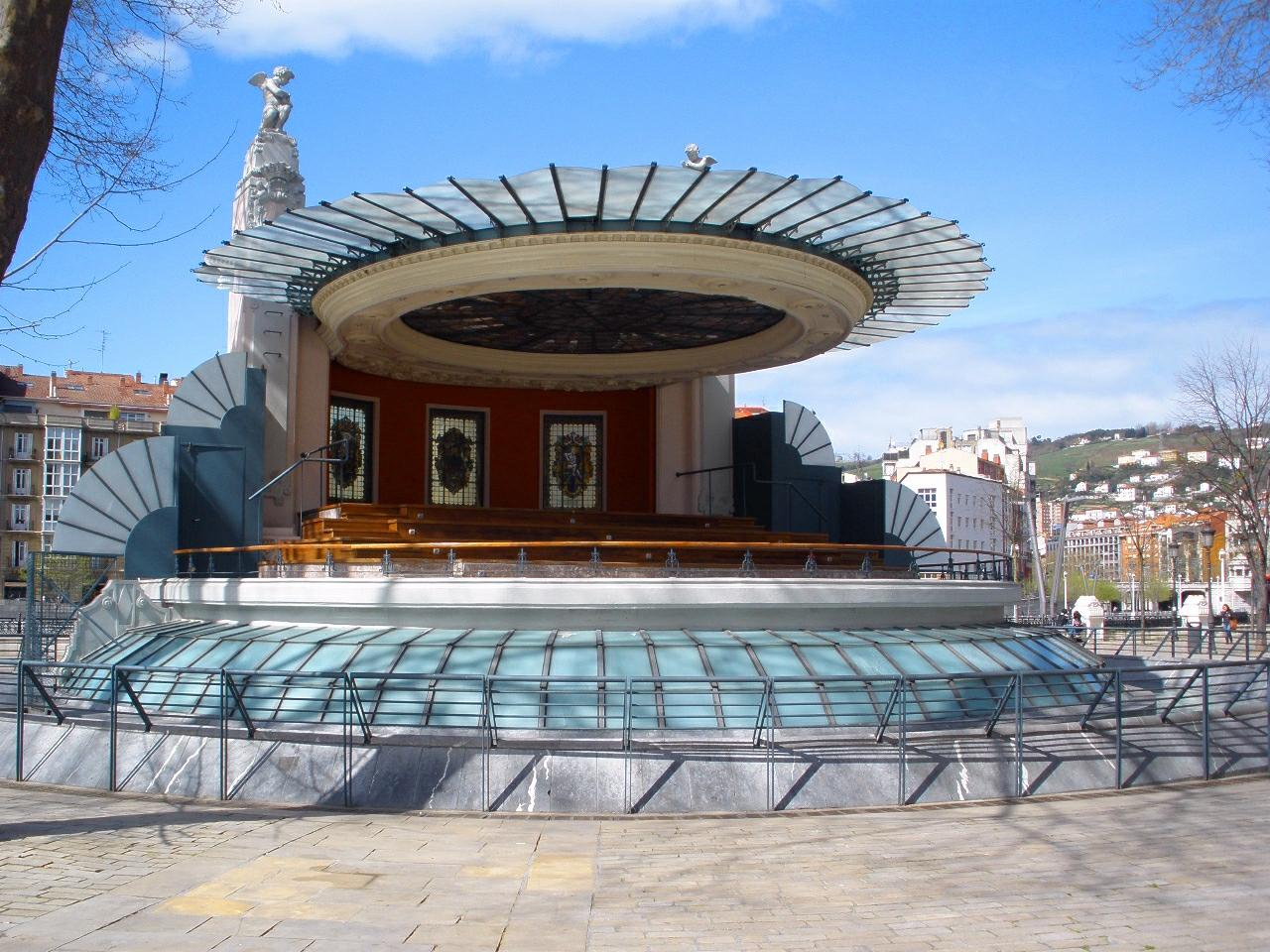
Arenal Kiosk in Bilbao.

Works by Pedro Ispizua in Bilbao
- Casa Garategui, Bermeo (1921)
- Casa Muñoa, Bermeo (1921)
- Hygienic houses for fishermen, Bermeo (1921)
- Casa Astorquiza, Bermeo (1921)
- Ciudad Jardín Bilbaína, Bilbao (1922)
- Ollerías school group, Bilbao (1922 project, 1931 realization)
- Tomás Camacho school group, Bilbao (1922)
- Maestro García Rivero school group in the Atxuri neighborhood, Bilbao (1923 project, 1926–28 realization)
- Casa de Julián Abando, Henao 38-42, Bilbao (1923–25)
- Casa Cartaeta, Bermeo (1924)
- Palomar del Arenal, Bilbao (1924, knocked down in the 1940s)
- Casa Abans-Azurmendi, Recalde 57, Bilbao (1925)
- Casa Salgado, General Concha 24-26, Bilbao (1925)
- Bitz-Gane Residential Group, Bakio (1925)
- Pergola of the Doña Casilda Iturrizar Park, Bilbao (1925)
- Casa Garay, Bakio (1926)
- Casa Serrats, Bermeo (1926)
- Casa Sociedad Tonelera del Norte, Goya 6 and Gordoniz 54, Bilbao (1926)
- Casa Errekakoetxe 6-10, Bilbao (1926)
- Casa Urquijo 37-43, Bilbao (1926)
- Cinema Ideal, Bilbo (1926, missing)
- Kiosco de música in Arenal (Bilbao) (1923–28)
- Mercado de la Ribera, Bilbao (1927–30)
- Monument-fountain to Bolívar, Ziortza-Bolibar (1927)
- Infectious Diseases Hospital near the BBK Children's House, Bermeo (1928)
- Casa S.A. Elejabarri, Gordoniz 50-52 and Goya 1-9, Bilbao (1928)
- Casa Ispizua y Vega Vivero, Dr Carmelo Gil 9, Bilbao (1929)
- S.A. Iparraguirre Group Houses, Iparraguirre 56 and Egaña 23-27, Bilbao (1928–29)
- Club Deportivo de Bilbao (1929–31, demolished in the 1967)
- Casa Barañano, Bilbao (1930)
- Casa Fernández Gamboa, Iparraguirre 45-47, Bilbao (1930–31)
- Casa Guerrero-García-Ispizua, Labayru 19-23, Bilbao (1930)
- School Church of the Carmelite Sisters of Charity, Bermeo (1930)
- Auxiliary Office Building of the Bilbao City Hall (1931)
- Batzoki of Bermeo (1932)
- Luis Briñas School Group, Bilbao (1933)
- Vivienda Ispizua, Avenida de las Universidades 8, Bilbao (1933, demolished in the 1970s)
- Casa Azurmendi, Recalde 55, Bilbao (1933)
- Casa Abando, Iparraguire 9-11 and Juan Ajuriaguerra 21, Bilbao (1933–34)
- Casa Hermanos Zárate, calle Santa María, Bilbao (1934)
- Edificio Gutiérrez, Licenciado Poza, Bilbao (1934)
- Casa Arenaza, María Díaz de Haro 20, Bilbao (1935)
- Casa Martínez, Iparraguirre 41-43, Bilbao (1935)
- Casa Panera, Licenciado Poza 31-33 and Ercilla 36, Bilbao (1935)
- Casa Hernaiz, en Dr. Areilza 2, Bilbao (1935–36)
- Casa Gurtubay, Urquijo 52 and Plaza Indautxu, Bilbao (1936–39)
- Casa Panera, Rodríguez Arias 10-12 and Ercilla, Bilbao (1936)
- Casa Echeverría, Gordoniz 20, Bilbao (1938)
- Casa Panera, Gran Vía 48 and Máximo Aguirre 11, Bilbao (1938–39)
- Casa San Martín, Rodríguez Arias 19-21, Bilbao (1938)
- Casa Bruno, Urquijo 44-48, Bilbao (1939)
- Casa Fernández Gamboa, Bilbao and Andrés Isasi, Guecho (1939)
- Casa Panera, Colón de Larreategui 33, Bilbao (1939)
- Casa Olabarría, Plaza Zabalburu 1 and Alda. San Mamés, Bilbao (1938–40)
- Casa Panera, Gran Vía 70-72, Bilbao (1940)
- Edificio de Viviendas, Gran Vía 79, Bilbao (1940)
- Casa Unceta, Guernika (1940)
- Colegio La Salle, Palencia (1940)
- Casa Medina, General Eguía 37, Bilbao (1941)
- Teatro Ayala, in Manuel Allende 18, Bilbao (1941–43 missing)
- Casa Panera, en Gran Vía 55 esquina con Gregorio de la Revilla 1, Bilbao (1941–46)
- Casa Lachiondo, Getxo (1942)
- Edificio El Tigre, Deusto (1942–47)
- Ormaza Factory, Bermeo (1942)
- Tejada Building, Núñez de Balboa 83 and Juan Bravo, Madrid (1942)
- Bilbao Real Estate, Gran Vía 68, Bilbao (1943)
- Edificio Aviación y Comercio, Bilbao (1944)
- Jardines de Albia, Bilbao (urbanismo, 1944)
- Casa Abaitua-Bayo, Dr Areilza 38, Bilbao (1945)
- Grupo Residencial Larrazábal, Zurbaran (1945)
- Casa Ispizua Uribarri, Recalde 8-10, Bilbao (1946)
- Colegio La Salle, Santander (1946)
- Church of the College of Santiago Apóstol La Salle, Bilbao (1946–50, demolished in 1976 due to the closure of the College)
- Casa Ispizua, Recalde 12-14, Bilbao (1946–51)
- Casa Besga, currently Archivo Histórico de Euskadi, María Días de Haro 3, Bilbao (1947, remodeled facade)
- Colegio Santa María, Portugalete (1948)
- Colegio La Salle, Valladolid (1950)
- Astra-Unceta Factory, Gernika (1950)
- Aroe Housing Workshops, Enrique Eguren 5 y Labayru 6, Bilbao (1951)
- Colegio La Salle, Santiago de Compostela (1952)
- Club Arizona, currently Hotel Catalonia Gran Vía Bilbao, Gran Vía 71, Bilbao (1953, demolished 2017)
- Colegio Lourdes La Salle, Valladolid (1953)
- Casa Ispizua, Algorta (1954)
- Casa Abando Bengoa, Guecho (1956)
- Ordination La Salle Center, Seminary and Church, Salamanca (1956)
- Reconstruction of the Santuario de Santa María de la Estrella of the De La Salle Brothers, San Asensio (La Rioja) (1951–58)
- Iglesia de San Felicísimo, Bilbao (1958–60)
- Church of Nuestra Señora Reina de la Paz of the Minor Capuchin of Valladolid (1961–63)
- Casa Ugalde, Mungia (1962)
- Colegio Hermanas Carmelitas de la Caridad, Vitoria (1963)
