= Bilbao la Vieja =

Neighbourhood of Bilbao, Spain

Coordinates: 43°15′16″N 2°55′27″W

Bilbao La Vieja in Spanish, "Old Bilbao" in English and Bilbo Zaharra in Basque.

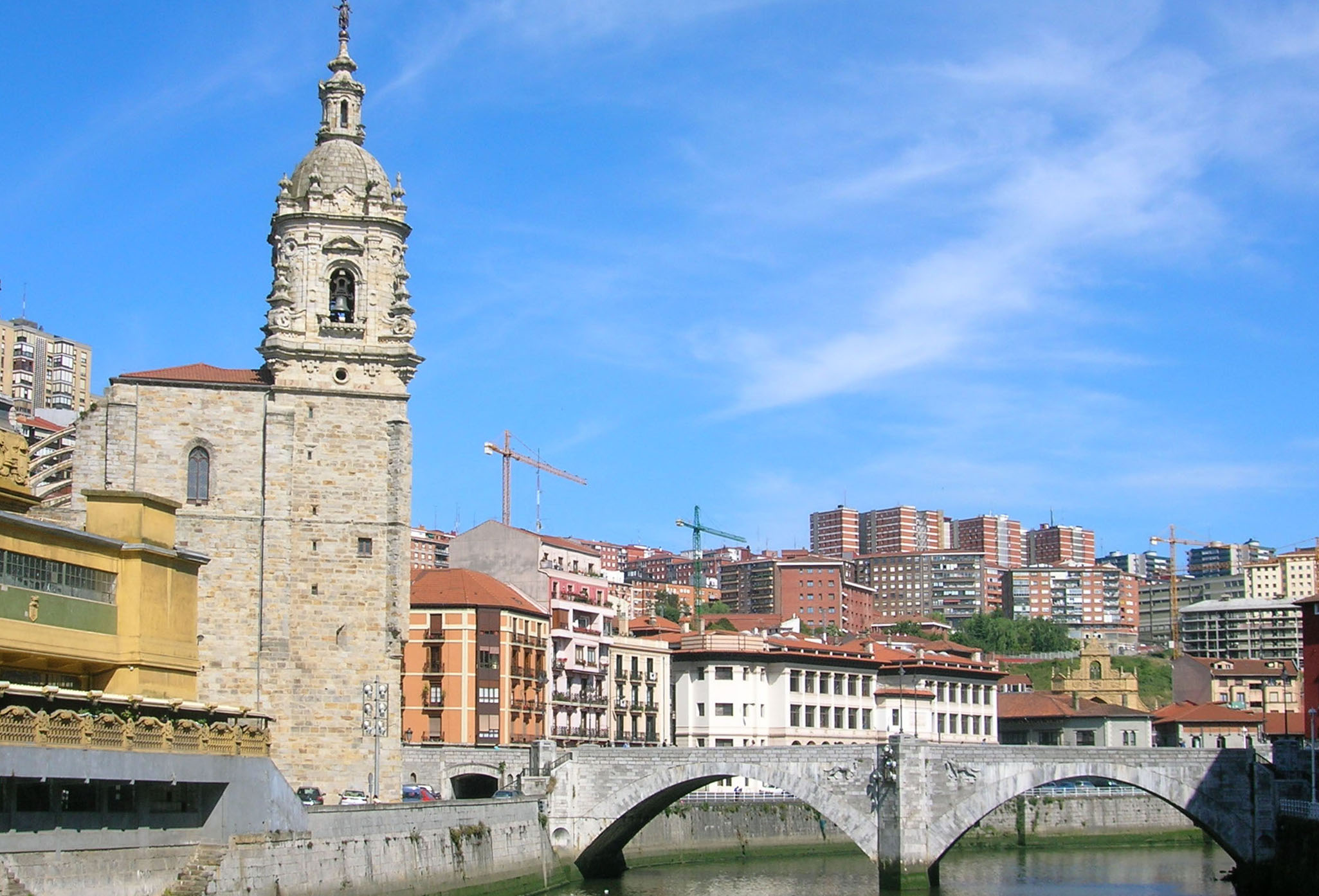
San Antón Bridge with Atxuri in the background

Coat of arms of Bilbao.

It is a neighbourhood of Bilbao and part of the 5th district of the city (Ibaiondo).

== Location ==
In the city center, it lies right across the estuary, on the left bank of the Nervion River, united to the Old Town by the bridge of San Anton pictured above (portrayed in the city's coat of arms).

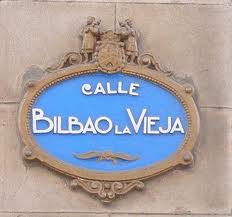
The homonymous street of Bilbao La Vieja

== History ==
=== Past ===
Bilbao La Vieja is the oldest neighbourhood of Bilbao, being older than even the medieval urban district (Casco Viejo), founded in 1300.

The development of Bilbao la Vieja was closely linked to that of the Miribilla mines, on the top of the Miribilla mountain behind the old neighborhood. Recently redeveloped as a newly built neighborhood. Bilbao La Vieja was traditionally where the majority of the miners resided. It was some of the first land used as an expansion of the medieval city was undertaken in the 18th and 19th centuries and became a fashionable neighborhood by the end of the 19th century.

=== Today ===
Due to its strategic location within the city of Bilbao and the end of the minery days years ago, Bilbao la Vieja is getting through a deep gentrification process.

Under the municipal government's new initiatives the neighborhood is redeveloping, with a number of new businesses and subsidies aimed at urban renewal and attracting the young to the area. This initiative has been largely very fruitful thus far. Many new shops and young entrepreneurs are setting up shop.

The neighborhood is also home to a growing immigrant population, making it one of the most vibrant communities in Bilbao.

== Transport ==
=== By foot ===
- Direct from Abando.
- Direct from Casco Viejo through Ribera bridge, el Merced bridge and San Antón bridge.
- 8 minutes (Approx.) from Plaza Elíptica.

=== Metro ===
Bilbao la Vieja has no stations itself. However, a number of them lie right next to it:

- Abando station
- Casco Viejo station

=== Train ===
Bilbao la Vieja has no stations itself. However, a number of them lie right next to it:

- Abando station
- Atxuri station

=== BilboBus ===
Lines and stops:

Línea	Recorrido	Paradas en Bilbao la Vieja
11	Deusto - Atxuri	Cortes 2, Muelle de la Merced 3
22	Sarrikure - Atxuri	Cortes 2, Muelle de la Merced 3
30	Txurdinaga - Miribilla	Dr. Fleming 1, Cruce entre Xenpelar con Zabala, Zabala 22
56	La Peña - Sagrado Corazón	Cortes 2, Muelle de la Merced 3, Urazurrutia 1, Urazurrutia 40, Zamakola 4
58	Mintegitxueta - Atxuri	Cortes 23, Cortes 13, Cortes 2, Urazurrutia 1
75	San Adrián - Atxuri	Cortes 2, Muelle de la Merced 3
77	Peñascal - Mina del Morro	Cortes 2, Muelle de la Merced 3
85	Zazpilanda - Atxuri	Cortes 2, Muelle de la Merced 3
