= Mercado de la Ribera =

Public market in Bilbao, Spain

Coordinates: 43.2555°N 2.9242°W

Market of the Rivera
- Mercado de la Ribera
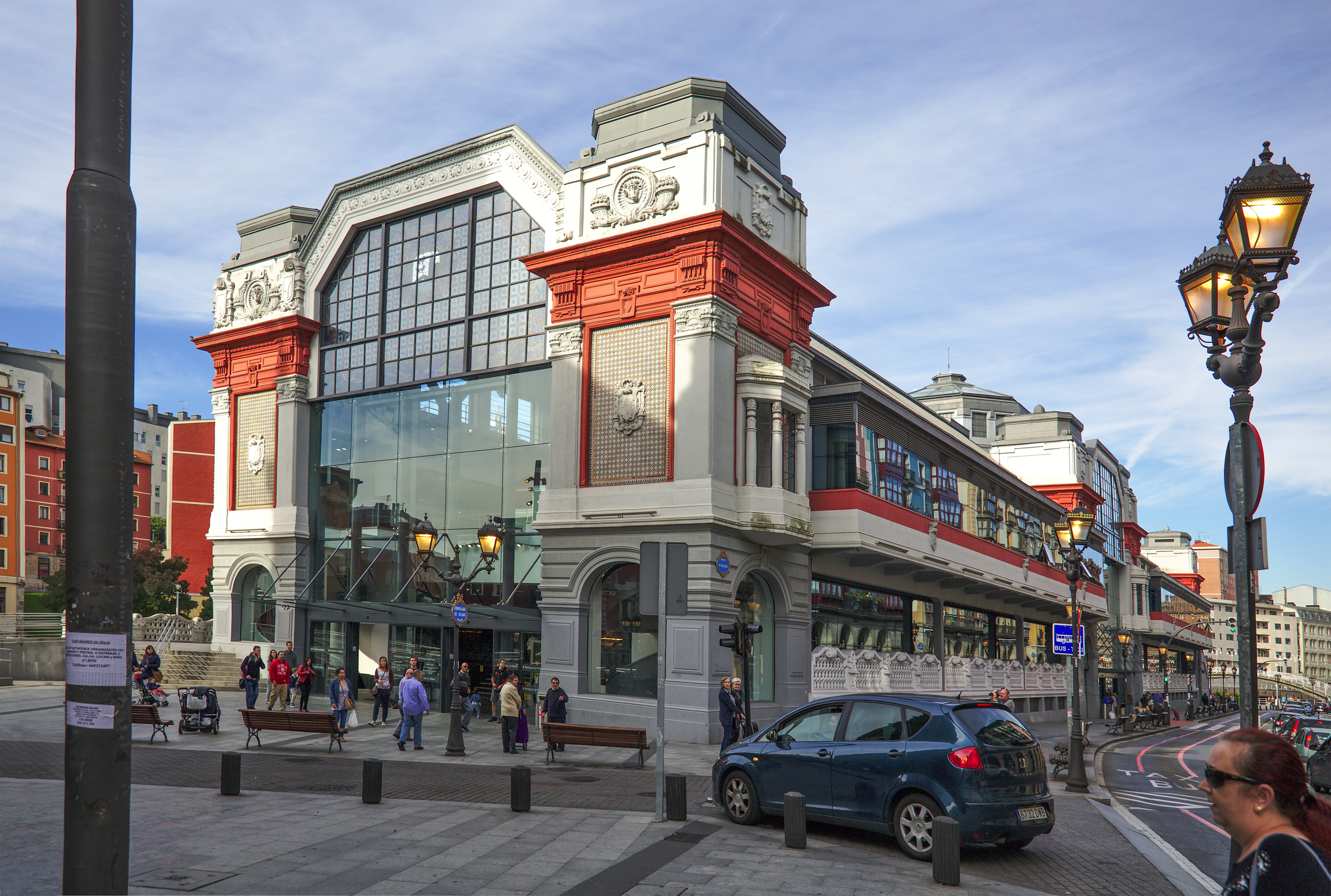

General information
- Type: Public market
- Location: Bilbao, Spain
- Inaugurated: 22 August 1929

Technical details
- Floor area: 10,000 m^{2} (110,000 sq ft)

Design and construction
- Architect: Pedro Ispizua

Other information
- Public transit: Ribera

Website
- Official website

The Mercado de la Ribera (Ribera Market; Basque: Ribera Merkatua) is a market square in Bilbao, the capital of the Basque Province of Viscay in the north of Spain. It is on the right bank of the Nervion River, next to Casco Viejo. Its built area of 10,000 square metres (110,000 sq ft) makes it the biggest covered market in Europe. Inside it, there are stalls that sell different products, mostly fresh produce. There are fish markets, butchers and green grocers. There is also a part of the market for the local farmers' products.

== Location ==
The Ribera Market is on Ribera St., on the bank of the Nervion River. On the site of the old grand square. Next to it is the Church of San Antón. The Ribera St. is between the banks of the river and the buildings of the Old Town, also known as the "Siete Calles" in Spanish or "Zazpi kaleak" in Basque that is the main commercial area of the city. The former narrow gauge Euskotren Trena train station is 3 minutes from the market.

== More information ==
It was recognized in 1990 as the most complete municipal food market by the Guinness Book of Records. It is the largest in terms of traders and stalls and the biggest covered market as regards space in the whole of Europe, with a surface area of 10,000 square metres. Refurbishment work began mid-2009 aimed at renewing its structure, stalls and services to remain a reference for shoppers in the 21st century. More than 60 merchants provide customers with produce: meat, fruit, shellfish, cheeses, cooked meats, frozen food, mushrooms and fungi.
