= Ibaiondo =

Coordinates: 43.2569°N 2.92333°W

- District
- Ibaiondo district is highlighted in blue in this map of the districts of Bilbao.
- Interactive map of Ibaiondo
- Country: Spain
- Autonomous community: Basque Country
- Province: Biscay
- Comarca: Greater Bilbao
- Municipality: Bilbao

Area
  - District: 9.65 km^{2} (3.73 sq mi)
  - Urban: 2.45 km^{2} (0.95 sq mi)

Population (2016)
  - District: 61,184
  - Density: 6,340/km^{2} (16,400/sq mi)

Ibaiondo is the fifth district of the city of Bilbao (Biscay), in the Spanish Basque Country. Ibaiondo is a recently used name that means 'beside the river' in Basque. It is divided into the neighbourhoods of Atxuri, Bilbo Zarra, Casco Viejo, Iturralde, Abusu, San Adrián, San Francisco, Solokoetxe, Miribilla and Zabala.

The original walled city, the Casco Viejo, is located in this district, including the oldest buildings of the city like the Santiago Cathedral and Saint Anton Church, both from the 15th century.

Today the modern district includes both the oldest and the newest neighbourhood, Miribilla, which was started in 1999 and completed two years after.

It is the most extensive district of Bilbao, with an area of 9.65 km² (25% of the municipality) but the urban area has an area of only 2.45 km², the rest of the district is part of mount Pagasarri. It is also the city's most populated district, with 61,184 inhabitants in 2016.

== Sights ==
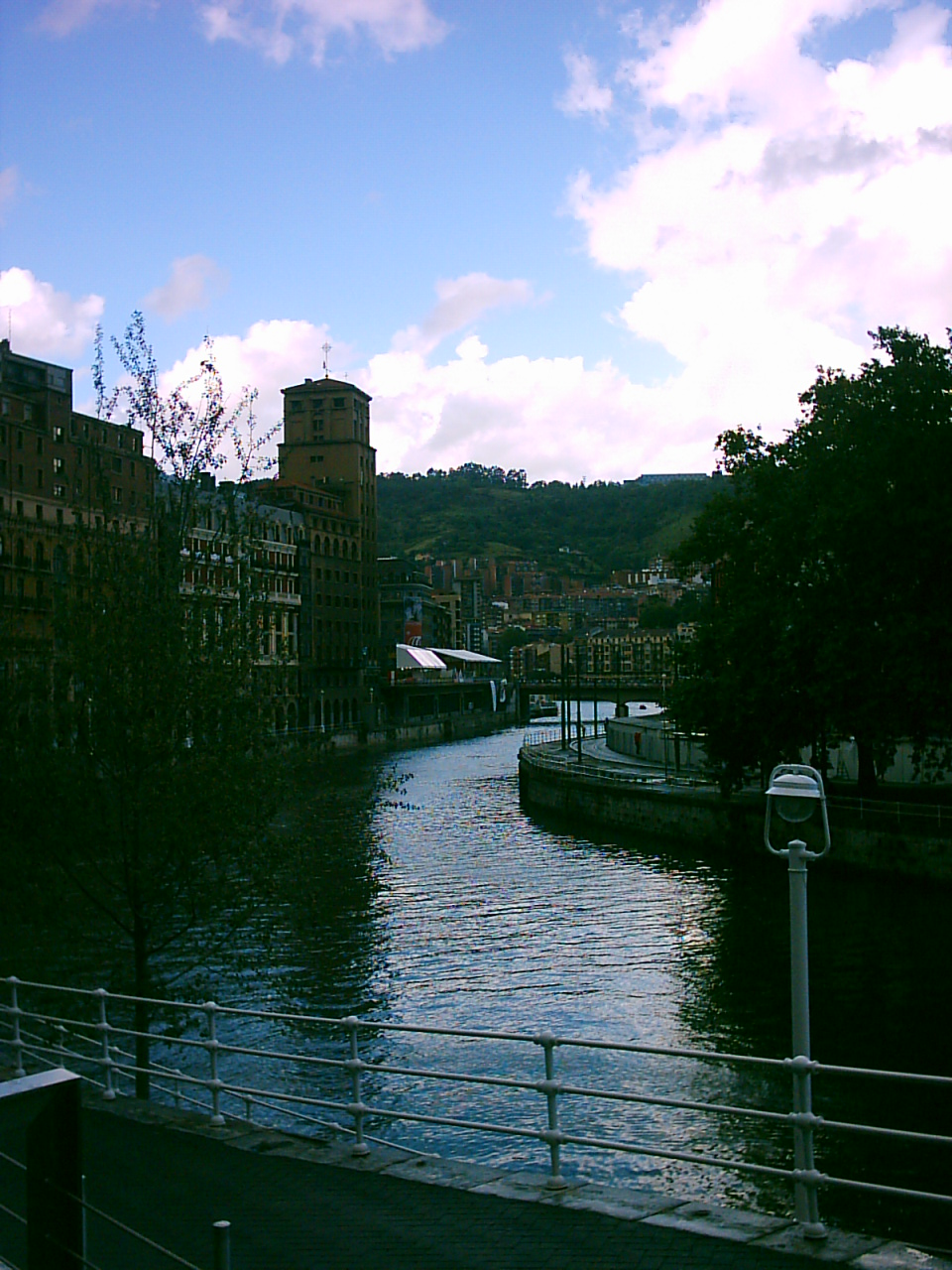
The Estuary of Bilbao in Ibaiondo.
