= Atxuri =

Coordinates: 43°15′13″N 2°55′17″W

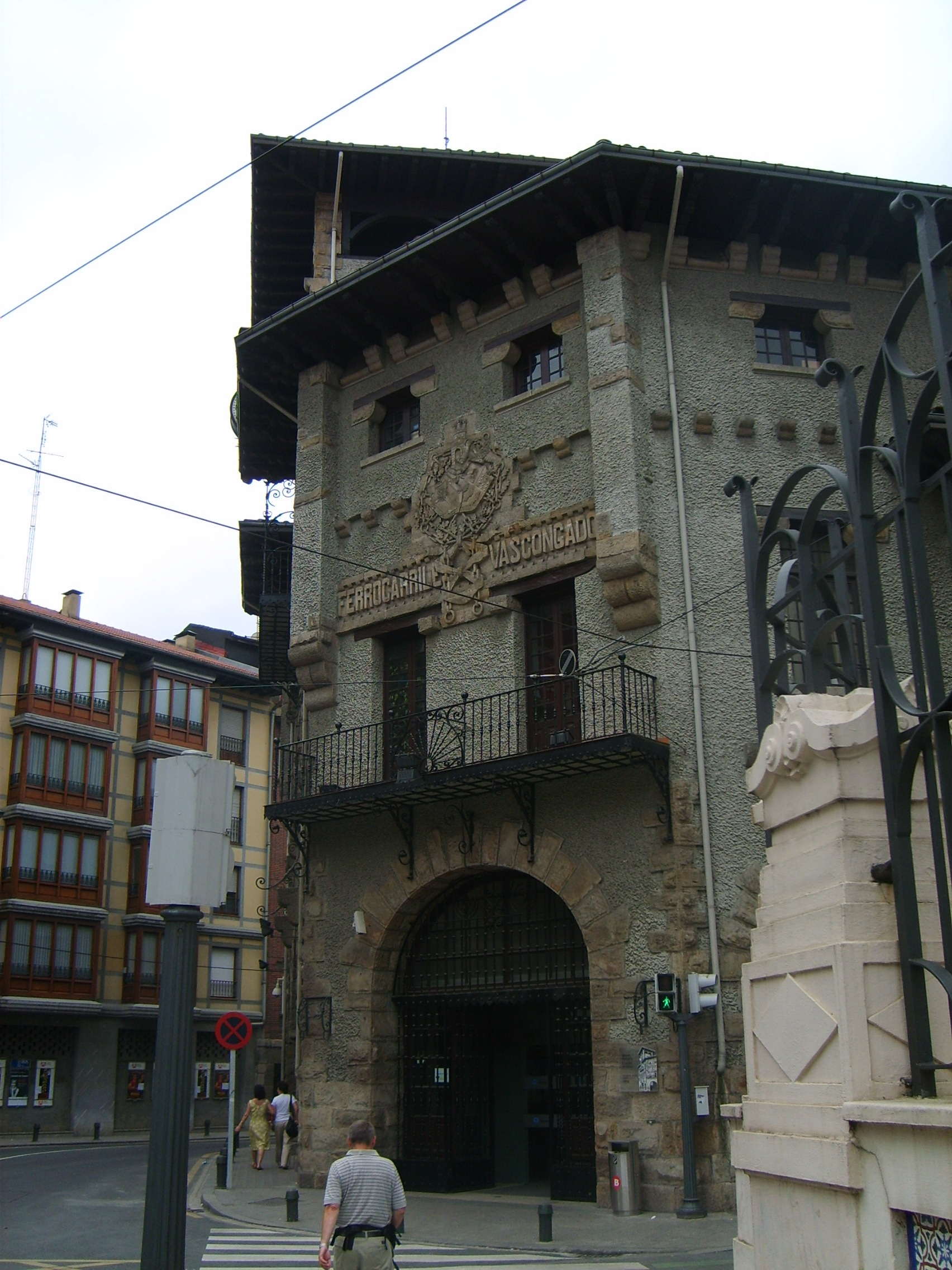
Atxuri station, EuskoTren.

Atxuri is a neighborhood of Bilbao, Basque country, Spain. It was originally a suburb south of the old walled town. Modernly it stands between this neighborhood and those of Solokoetxe, Santutxu and the estuary of Bilbao. Administratively, it belongs to the 5th district of the city. It hosts Bilbao-Atxuri Station, the main EuskoTren railway station, that links Bilbao with San Sebastián and Bermeo.
