= Casco Viejo =

Coordinates: 43°15′26″N 2°55′26″W

Casco Viejo / Siete Calles Alde Zaharra / Zazpikaleak
- Neighbourhood
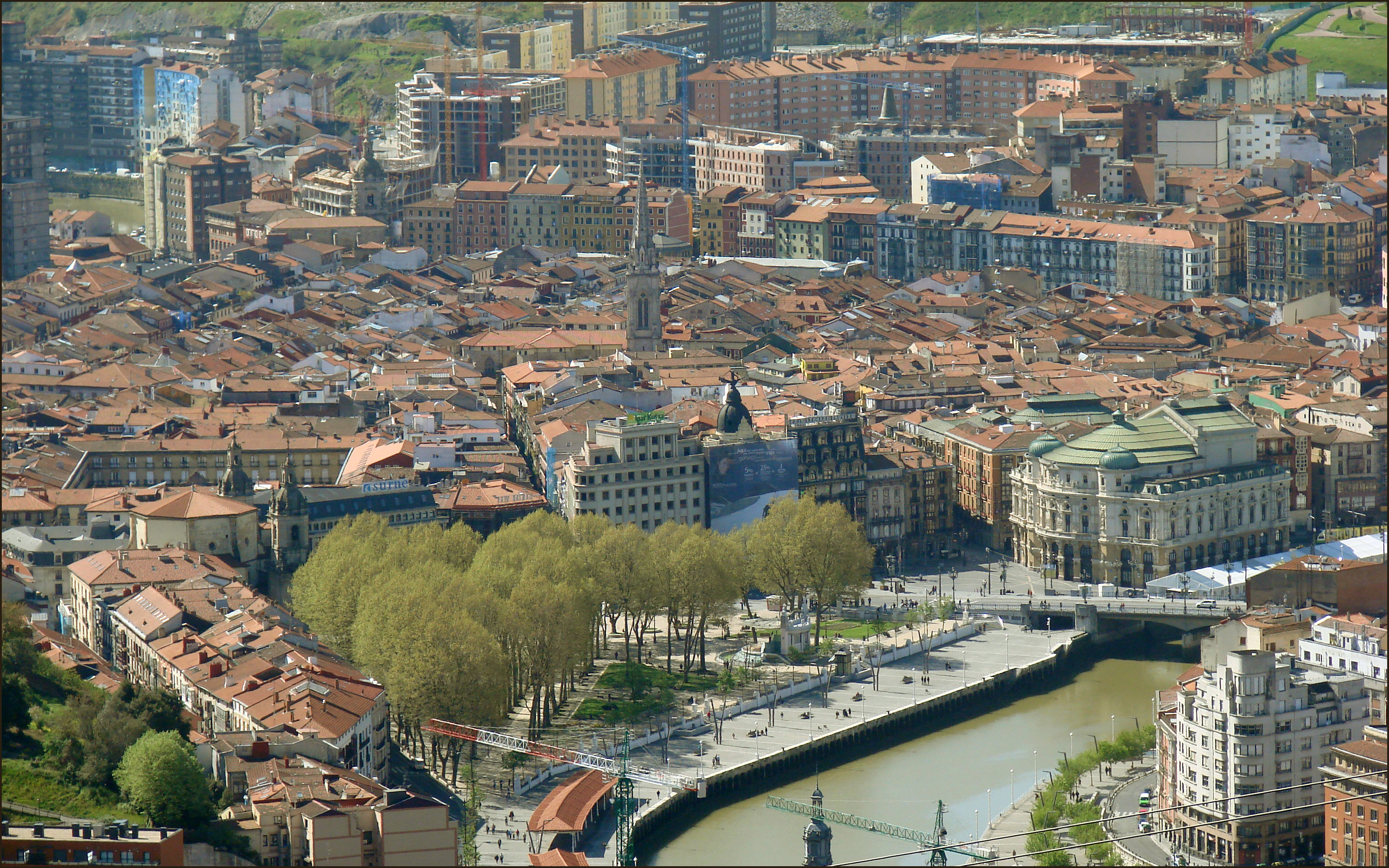
- Interactive map of Casco Viejo / Siete Calles
- Country: Spain
- Autonomous community: Basque Country
- Province: Biscay
- Municipality: Bilbao
- District: Ibaiondo

Spanish Cultural Heritage
- Type: Non-movable
- Criteria: Historic ensemble
- Designated: 9 November 1972
- Reference no.: RI-53-0000144

Las Siete Calles or Casco Viejo in Spanish or Zazpikaleak or Alde Zaharra in Basque are different names for the medieval neighbourhood of Bilbao, part of the Ibaiondo district. The walled section of the town existed until the end of the 19th century and was known by the names Seven Streets or Old Town, respectively.

== The Seven Streets ==
The name Zazpikaleak or Las Siete Calles (The Seven Streets) comes from the oldest part of the neighbourhood which included exactly 7 streets and some much more narrow alleys connecting them, called cantons (kantoi, cantón). The historical seven streets of Bilbao are:

- Somera, "upper"
- Artekale, "middle street"
- Tendería, "shopkeeper's"
- Belostikale, "rapid street"
- Carnicería Vieja, "old butchery"
- Barrenkale, "lower street"
- Barrenkale Barrena, "lower lower street"

The "8th" street is Ronda, which used to be the patrol street outside the walls. Later the town expanded northwards with the construction of the Plaza Berria or Plaza Nueva (new square) and the streets Santa María ("Saint Mary"), Bidebarrieta ("new ways"), Correo ("mail") and Askao. Nowadays the neighbourhood also includes the Ribera ("riverbank") street, the Arenal ("sandy place") Park and Esperanza ("hope") street as well.

The area is served by Casco Viejo station of the Bilbao Metro.

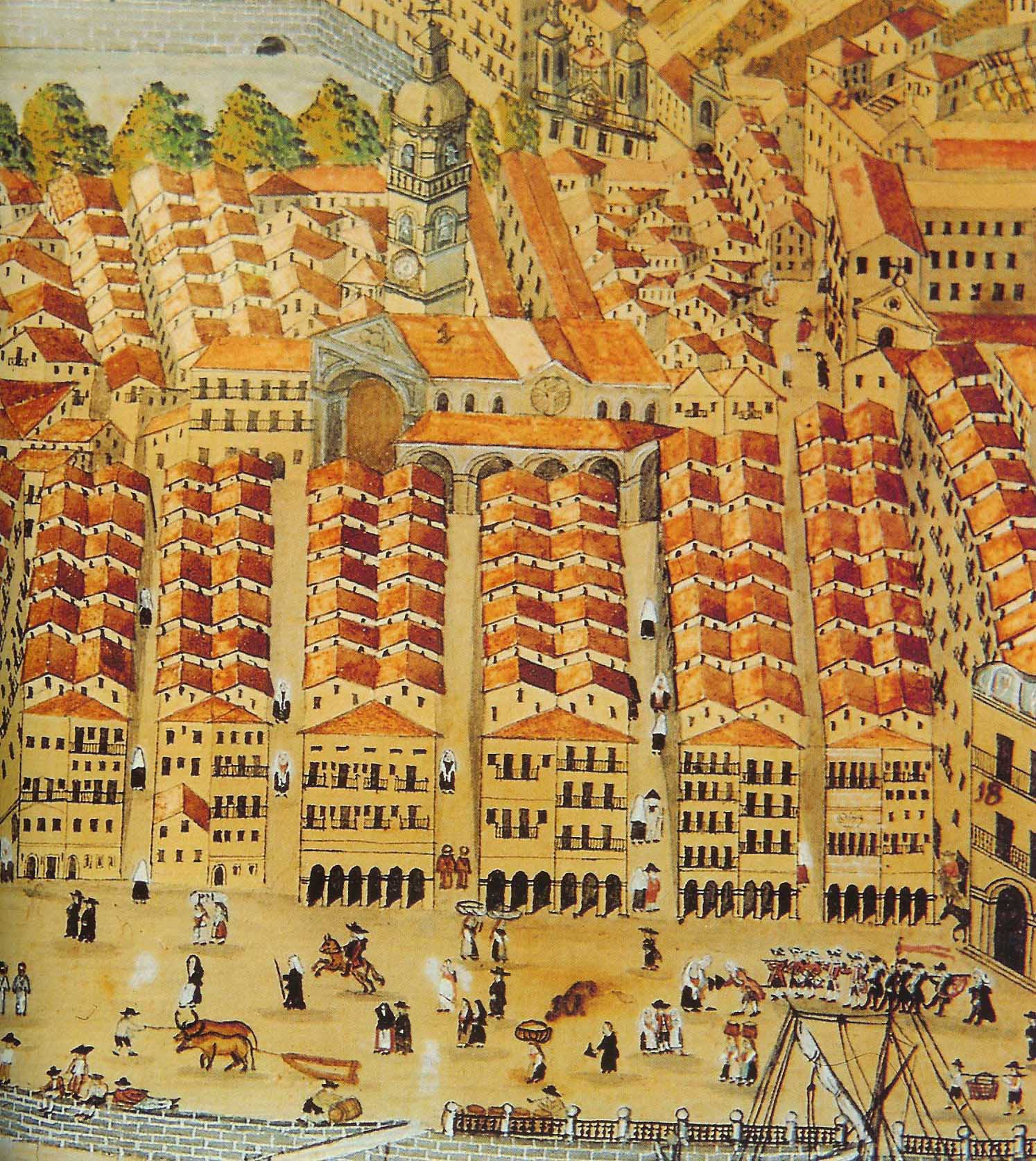
The seven parallel streets are visible in this picture from the 18th century.

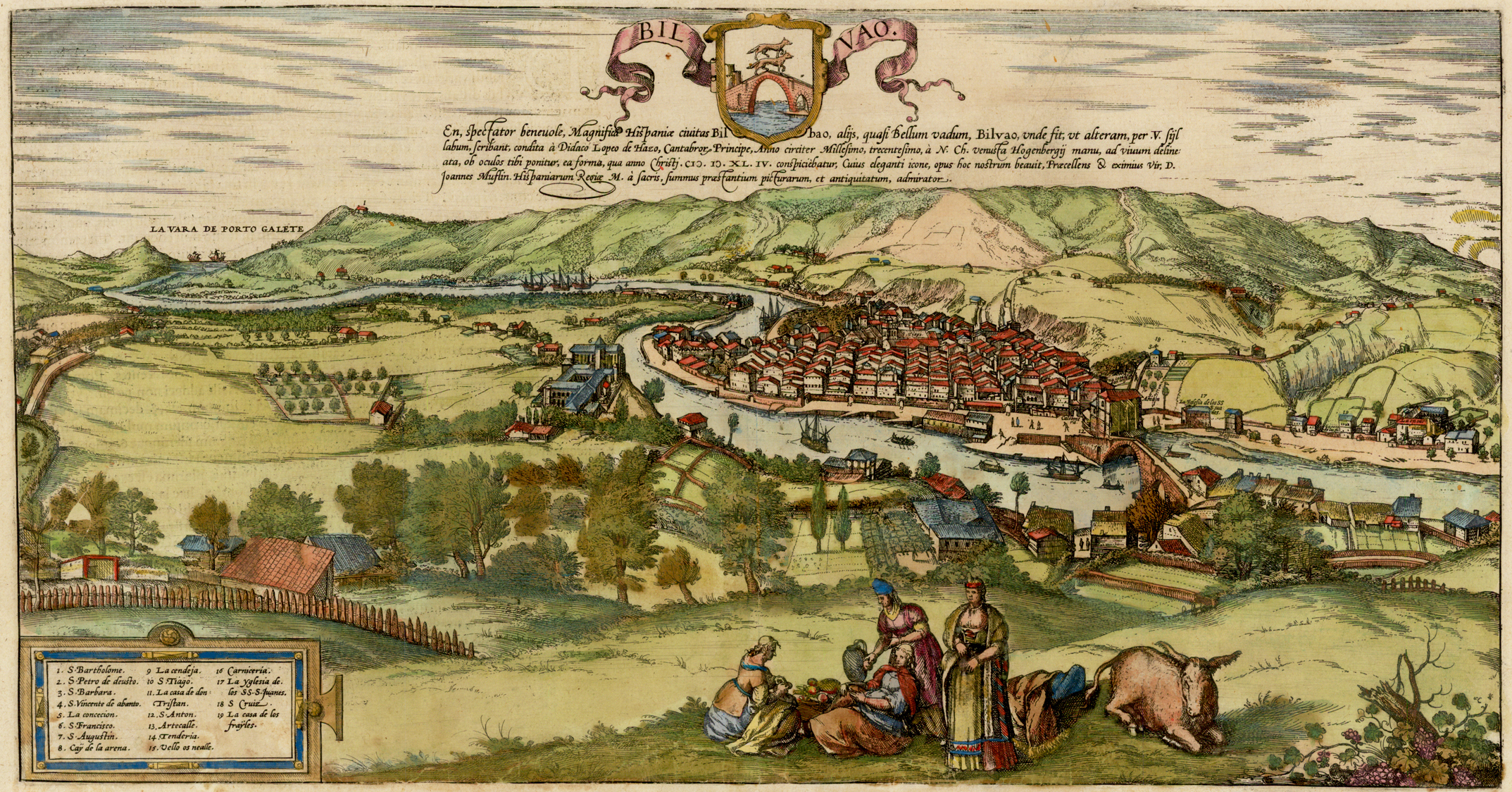
The medieval town, now Casco Viejo, as seen in 1575.

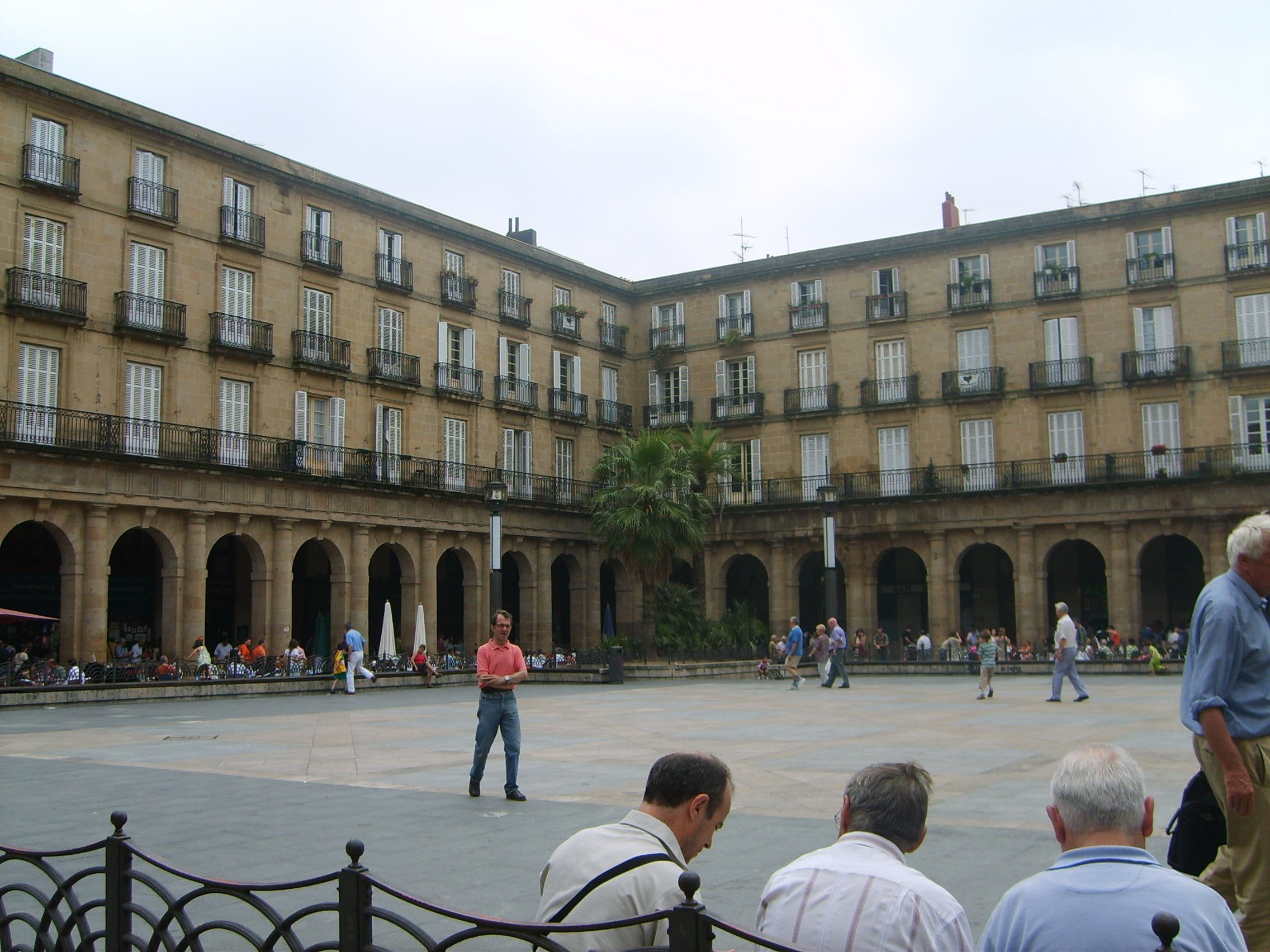
Plaza Nueva

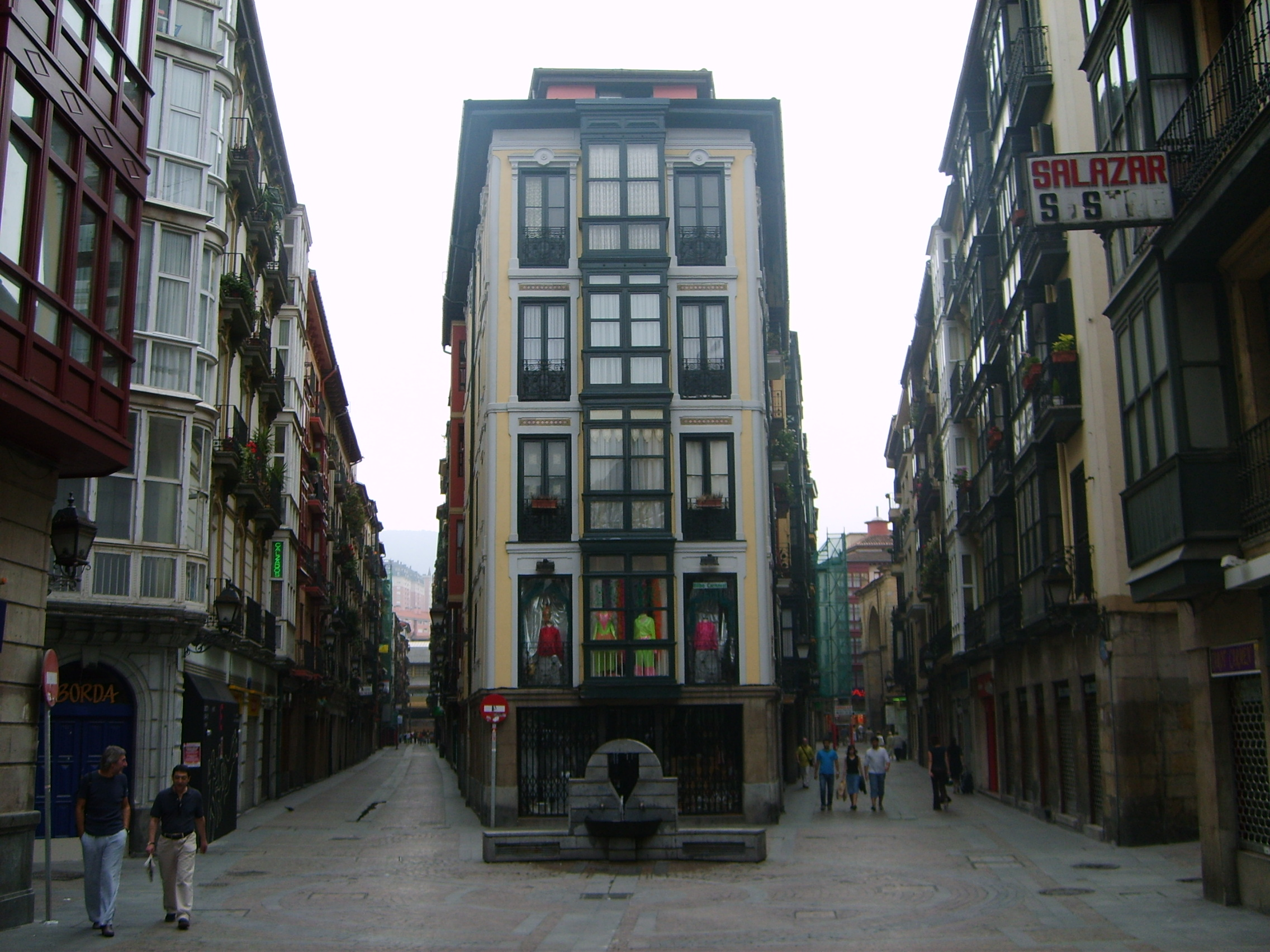
Casco viejo, Portal de Zamudio

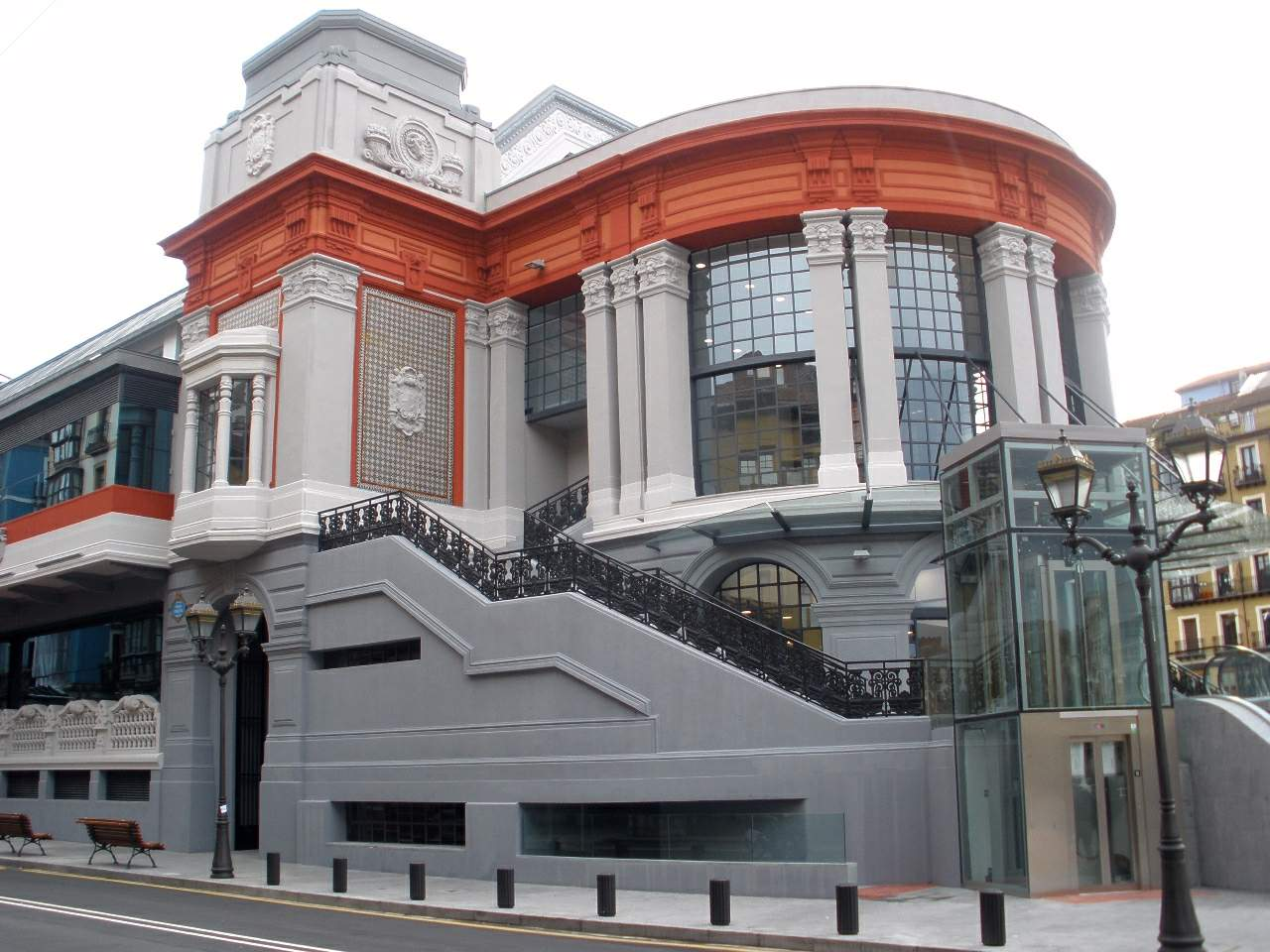
The market Mercado de la Ribera

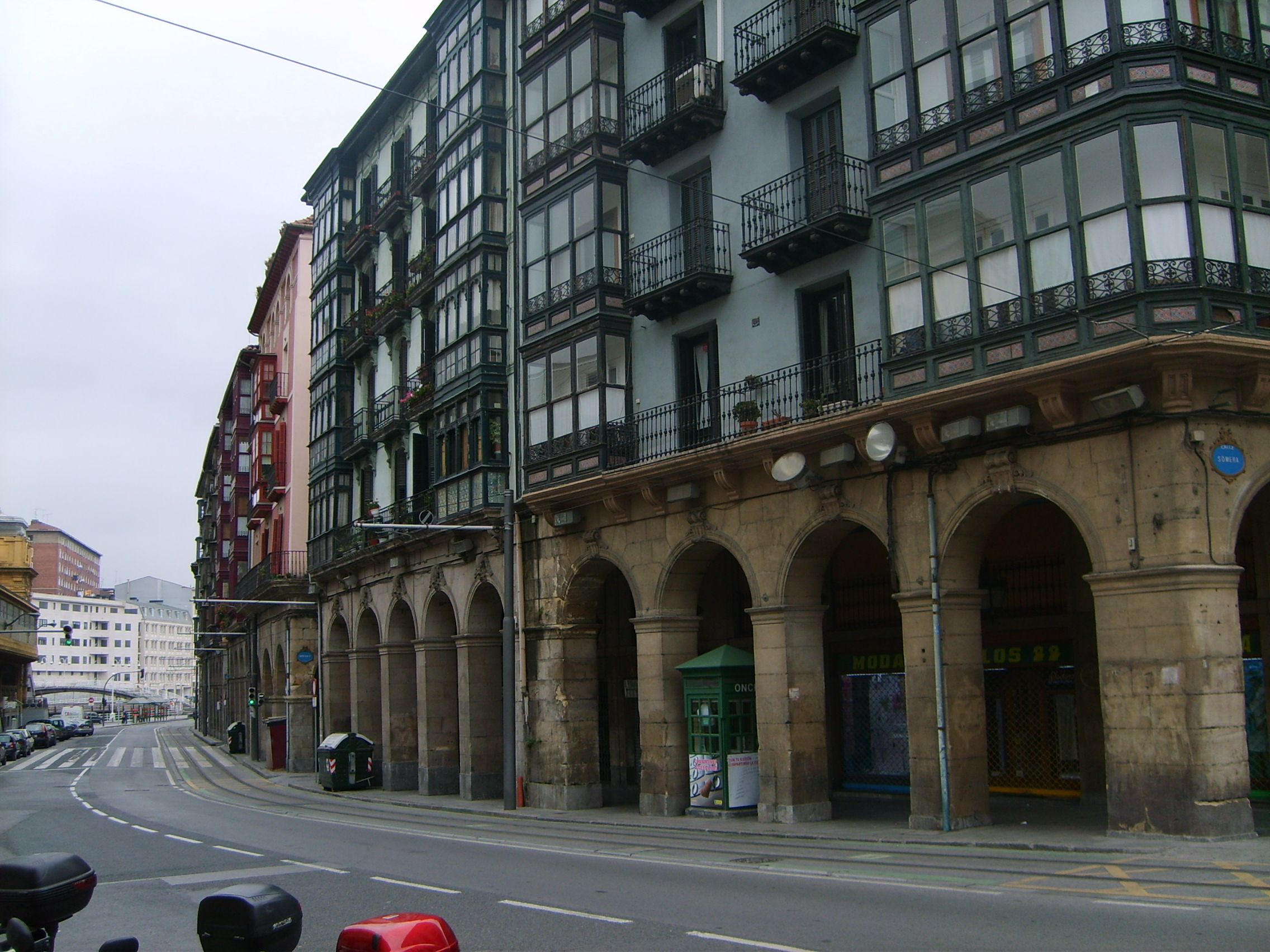
La Ribera

== Tourism ==
The area is probably the most colorful part of Bilbao, including many shops and taverns, several historical churches (San Antón, Santos Juanes, the Cathedral, San Nicolás), a large food retail market (Mercado de la Ribera), the public Arriaga Theatre, the seat of the Academy of the Basque Language (Euskaltzaindia), a ball court, and a public library. It is connected to the rest of the city and conurbation by the metro, tramway and buses. Three public elevators also connect Casco Viejo to the neighbourhoods of Begoña and Solokoetxe, which otherwise demand a rather intense uphill walk.

There is a tradition of middle-age men doing a tavern crawl drinking short glasses (chiquitos) of wine and singing choral songs.
