= Begoña Bombing =

1942 terrorist incident in Spain

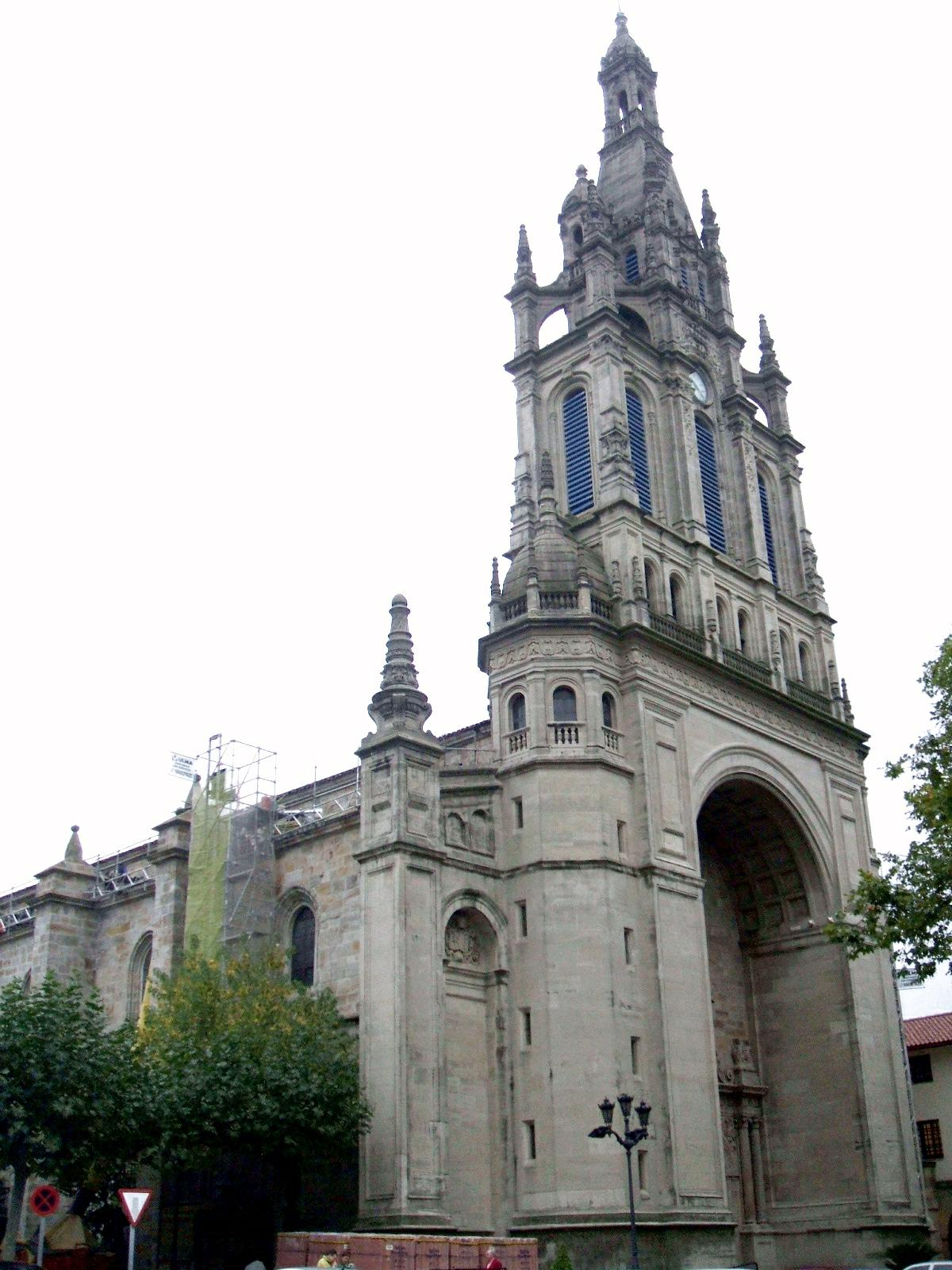
- Basilica of Begoña
- Location: 43.2588°N 2.9142°W; Begoña, Bilbao
- Date: 16 August 1942
- Target: Carlist General José Enrique Varela
- Attack type: Bombing
- Weapon: Hand grenade
- Deaths: 0
- Injuries: 70
- Perpetrators: Juan José Domínguez Muñoz and 7 other Falangists

The Begoña Bombing was an attack in the Basilica of Begoña in the Bilbao neighbourhood in Begoña on 16 August 1942, during the first period of the Francoist Spain (1936–1959), in which a hand grenade, thrown by the Falangist Juan José Domínguez Muñoz, caused seventy minor injuries. The act was interpreted as a failed attempt on the life of Carlist General José Enrique Varela, the Minister of the Army.

== History ==
In early August 1942 at the end of a Requiem Mass for fallen Carlists in the Spanish Civil War celebrated at the church of San Vicente de Abando in Bilbao, shouts were heard against the Falangists. A Falangist "old shirt" from Bilbao considered it a provocation and asked the Deputy Secretary of the Falange Española Tradicionalista y de las Juntas de Ofensiva Nacional Sindicalista (FET y de las JONS), José Luna Meléndez – a Falangist close to "El Cuñadísimo" Ramón Serrano Suñer – to organize a response since on 15 August there was to be a Carlist commemoration of their fallen at the Basilica of Begoña in Bilbao which would be presided over by the Minister of Defense, General Varela.

On the eve of the celebration, the Commander of the Falange Militia of Bilbao informed his Regional Head, based in Burgos, that among the attendees at Begoña would be Basque nationalists disguised in Carlist uniform with weapons ready to provoke an incident. That same day, 14 August, "after having received instructions", Eduardo Berástegui, the Head of the Sindicato Español Universitario (SEU) of Biscay, and an "old shirt" named Hernando Calleja Calleja left Valladolid. In San Sebastián they picked up Juan José Domínguez Muñoz who, like Calleja, had just returned from the Eastern Front where they fought with the Blue Division. They returned to Bilbao during the early morning of 15 August.

The Mass in honour of the fallen Carlists began at 11:30 a.m. at the Basilica of Begoña. At the end of the ceremony, the Falangists began to rebuke the attendees who responded with cries such as "Long live the King!", "Down with State Socialism! and “Death to Franco!" and suddenly Juan José Domínguez threw two bombs which caused a number of injuries and which almost reached General Varela. Domínguez and his accomplices were detained and General Varela immediately informed Franco of the events. He also called Minister of the Interior Valentín Galarza Morante to demand surrender of the detainees to the military courts to be subject to a summary court-martial. At the same time he sent a note to the eight Captaincy General in which he said the attacks were against the army.

The Falangist Ministers Ramón Serrano Suñer and José Luis de Arrese, who were on vacation, returned immediately to Madrid and there, together with José Antonio Girón, also a Falangist Minister, tried to prevent the conviction and execution of the detainees and downplayed the incident. They sent their own representative to Bilbao.

In the meantime, Franco continued his vacation in Galicia as if nothing had happened and did not react until 24 August, nine days after the attack. That day he called General Varela by telephone who told him there had been an attack against him and only luck saved him from death to which Franco responded: "Everything is to be done with great fairness, because in the case of a provocation things will vary". Of the eight Falangists involved in Begoña, Domínguez and Calleja were condemned to death. On 15 July Calleja's sentence was commuted. Domínguez, however, was shot on 1 September 1942.

Francisco Franco used the incident at Begoña to unseat the Falangists from power, including his brother-in-law Ramón Serrano Suñer, Foreign Minister, Valentín Galarza Morante, Minister of the Interior, and General José Enrique Varela, Minister of Defense. He also removed Head of the Falangist militia, José Luna Meléndez, despite having declared his loyalty to Generalísimo. His replacement was Manuel Mora Figueroa.
