= Begoña (name) =

Begoña is a popular girls name in the Basque Country and in Spanish-speaking areas. It is derived from the church dedicated to Our Lady of Begoña, and the name of the neighbourhood in Bilbao where the church is situated.

== As a given name ==
- Begoña Alfaro, Spanish politician
- Begoña Ameztoy, Spanish writer
- Begoña Aranguren, Spanish journalist and writer
- Begoña Blasco, Spanish gymnast
- Begoña Curero Sastre, Spanish Paralympic swimmer
- Begoña Errazti, Spanish politician
- Begoña Fernandez, Spanish handball player
- Begoña Fernández (mathematician), Mexican mathematician and mathematics professor
- Begoña Gómez (judoka), Spanish judoka
- Begoña García Grau, Spanish hockey player
- Begoña Gumucio, Chilean sailor
- Begoña García Piñero, Spanish basketball player
- Begoña Huertas, Spanish writer
- Begoña Larzabal, Spanish hockey player
- Begoña Maestre, Spanish actress
- Begoña Narváez, Mexican actress and model
- Begoña Palacios, Mexican TV actress
- Begoña Reina López, Spanish Paralympic swimmer
- Begoña Román Maestre, Spanish philosopher, university professor, researcher
- Begoña Sánchez, Spanish handball player
- Begoña Vargas, Spanish actress
- Begoña Vila, Spanish astrophysicist
- Begoña Via Dufresne, Spanish Olympic sailor
- Begoña Villacís, Spanish politician
- Begoña Vitoriano, Spanish mathematician and operations researcher

== As a surname ==
- Mary Begoña (1925–2020), Spanish actress & vedette
