= Mabel Cañada Zorrilla =

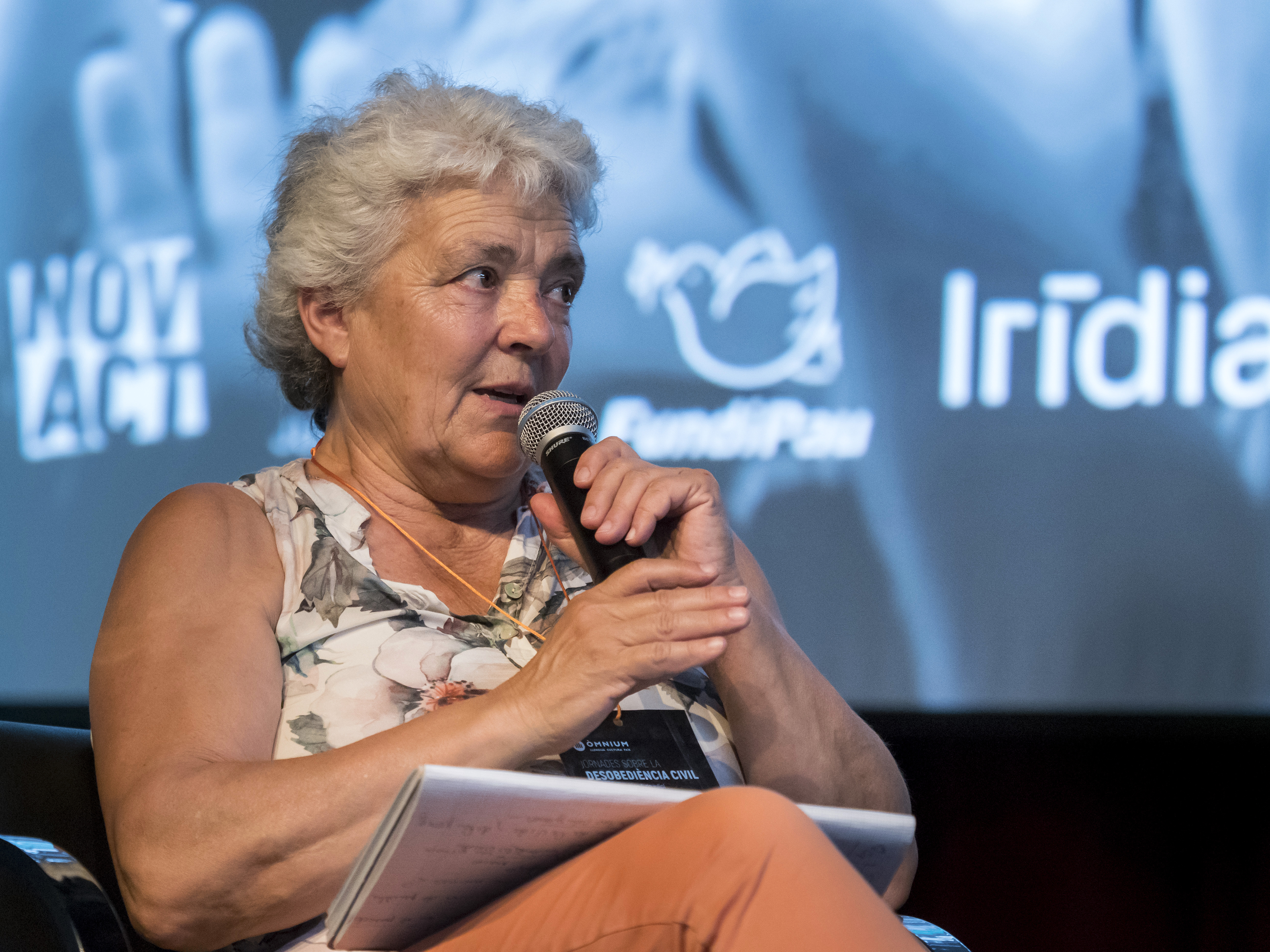
- Born: 1952; Bilbao, Spain
- Known for: Environmentalist

Mabel Cañada Zorrilla (Bilbao, 1952–present) is an antimilitarist and pacifist founder of the ecovillage of Lakabe, a town recovered in Navarra 40 years ago and integrated into the Iberian Ecovillage Network.

== Biography ==
Mabel Cañada was born in the Santutxu neighborhood of Bilbao in 1952. Daughter of Ángel, a Burgos glassmaker and Isabel, a Balmasedana who dropped out of nursing to care for her father, is the second of five sisters and two brothers. Mother of 4 people, active in groups such as the Conscientious Objection Movement (MOC), the feminist movement, and groups against large infrastructures such as nuclear power plants or the Itoiz reservoir in Navarra.

She was one of the founders of the community of Lakabe (Navarra) in 1980, an abandoned town that was squatted and recovered, in which coexistence is based on self-management, self- sufficiency, self-consumption, mutual support, and assembly operation.

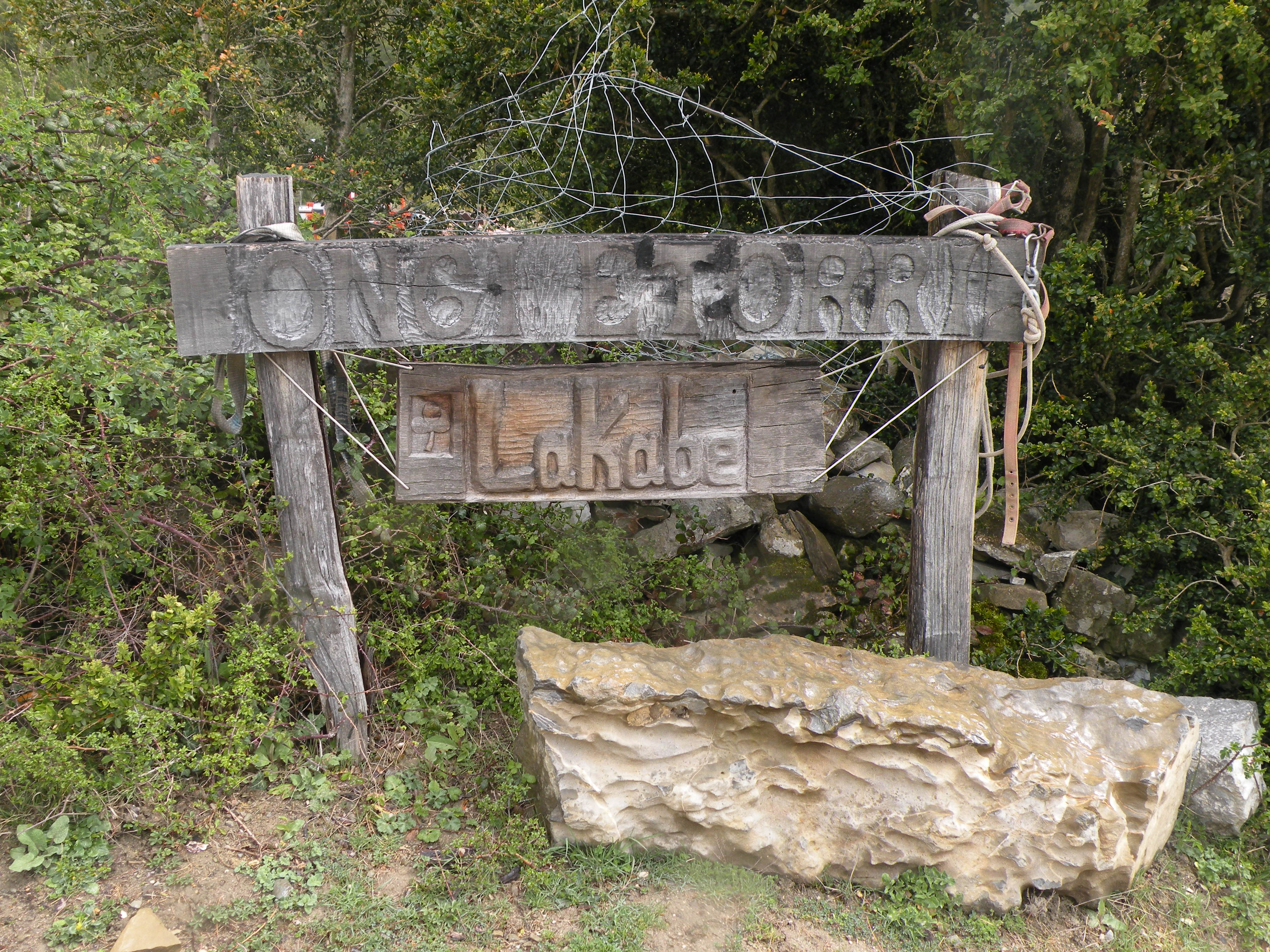
Welcome to Lakabe sign

Cañada has been trained in ways to create collectivity, to express oneself in a group, to live in community, to implement structures that allow horizontal decision-making, in process facilitation, experimental education and non-violent communication. It has also been formed in other communities such as Findhorn.

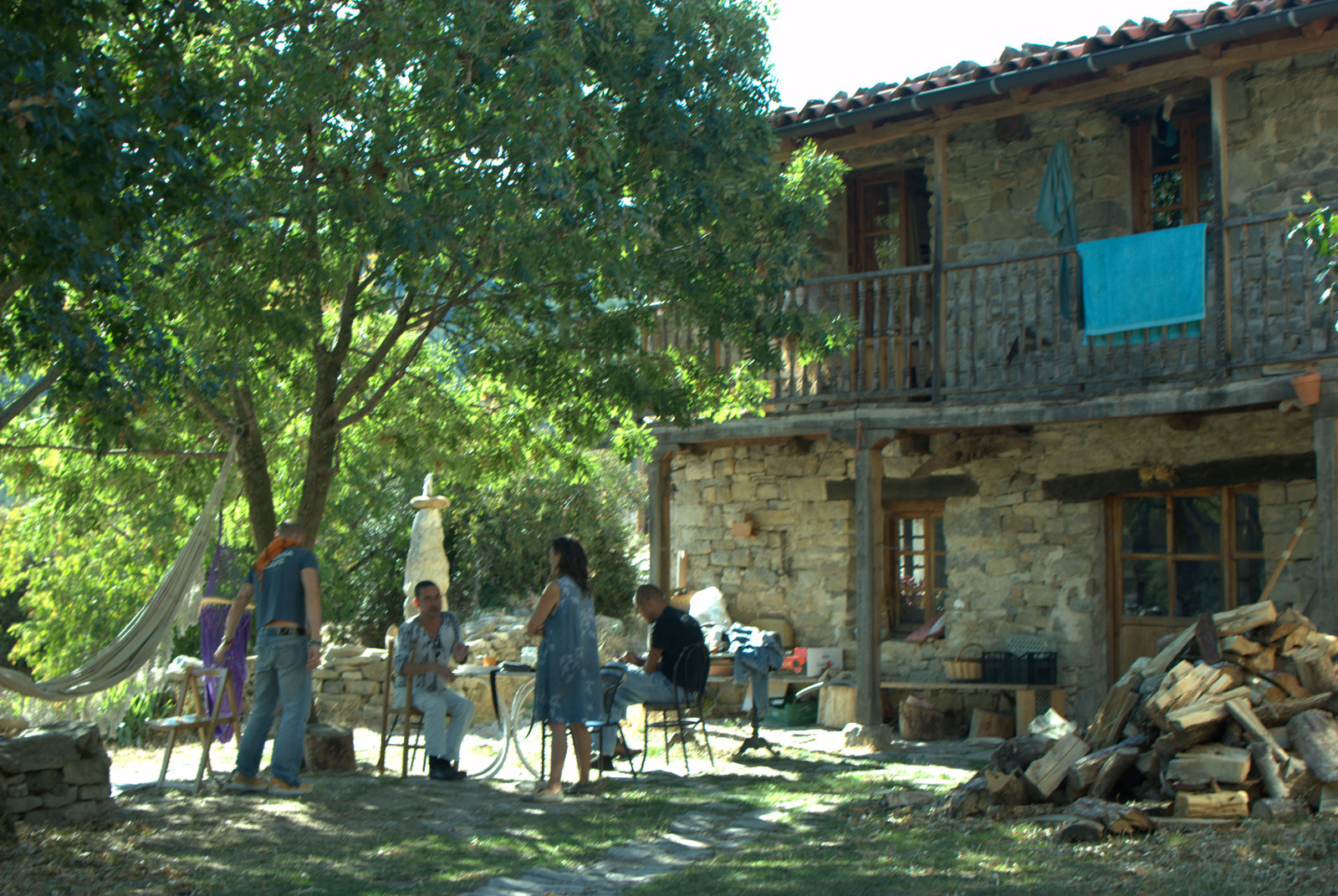
Lakabe, Navarra

Since 2004 she has been a facilitator of change processes, performs situation diagnoses for social groups, accompanies them in their own processes and teaches courses and workshops.
