= Santutxu (Bilbao Metro) =

Rapid transit station in Bilbao, Basque Country, Spain

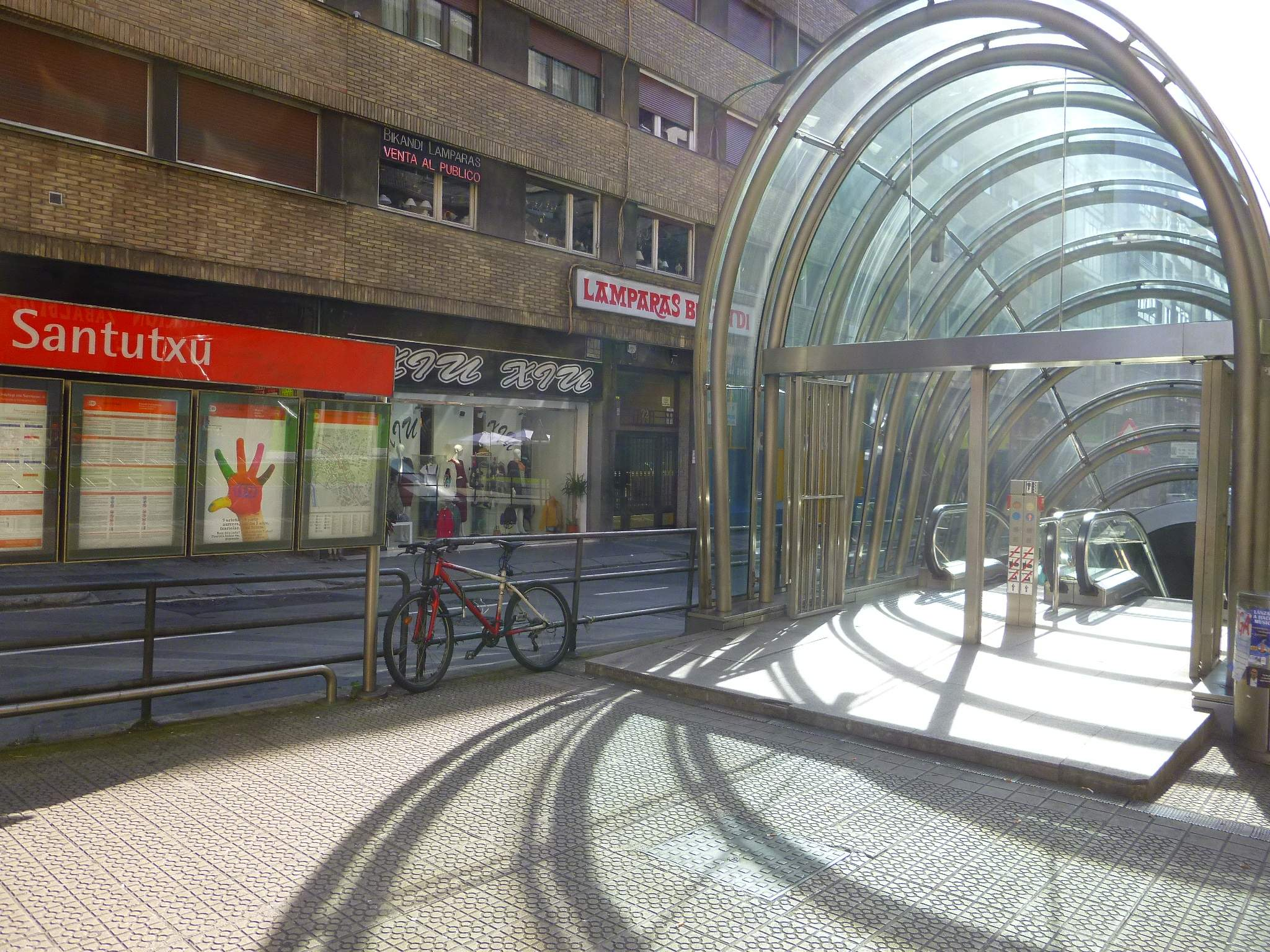
- Entrance to the station

General information
- Location: 53 Zabalbide street 48006 Bilbao; Spain
- Coordinates: 43°15′20″N 2°54′45″W
- Owner: Biscay Transport Consortium; Euskal Trenbide Sarea
- Lines: Line 1; Line 2
- Platforms: 2 side platforms
- Tracks: 2
- Connections: Bus

Construction
- Structure type: Underground
- Platform levels: 1
- Parking: No
- Accessible: Yes

Other information
- Fare zone: Zone 1

History
- Opened: 5 July 1997

Passengers
- 2021: 3,338,161

Services
Preceding station	Metro Bilbao	Following station
Zazpikaleak/Casco Viejo towards Plentzia	Line 1	Basarrate towards Etxebarri
Zazpikaleak/Casco Viejo towards Kabiezes	Line 2	Basarrate towards Basauri
Location

Santutxu is a station on Lines 1 and 2 of the Bilbao Metro. The station is located in the neighbourhood of Santutxu, in the district of Begoña in Bilbao. It opened on 5 July 1997.

== Station layout ==
Santutxu station follows the typical cavern-shaped layout of most underground Metro Bilbao stations designed by Norman Foster, with the main hall located directly above the rail tracks.

=== Access ===
- 53 Zabalbide St. (Zabalbide exit)
- 6 Tenor Fagoaga (Karmelo exit, closed during night time services)
- 12 Karmelo St. (Karmelo exit)

== Services ==
The station is served by Line 1 from Etxebarri to Ibarbengoa and Plentzia, and by Line 2 from Basauri to Kabiezes. The station is located near a Bilbobus stop served by the Santutxu-Biribila Plaza (40) and Santutxu-Lezeaga (48) lines.
