= La Salve =

Coordinates: 43.2694°N 2.9318°W

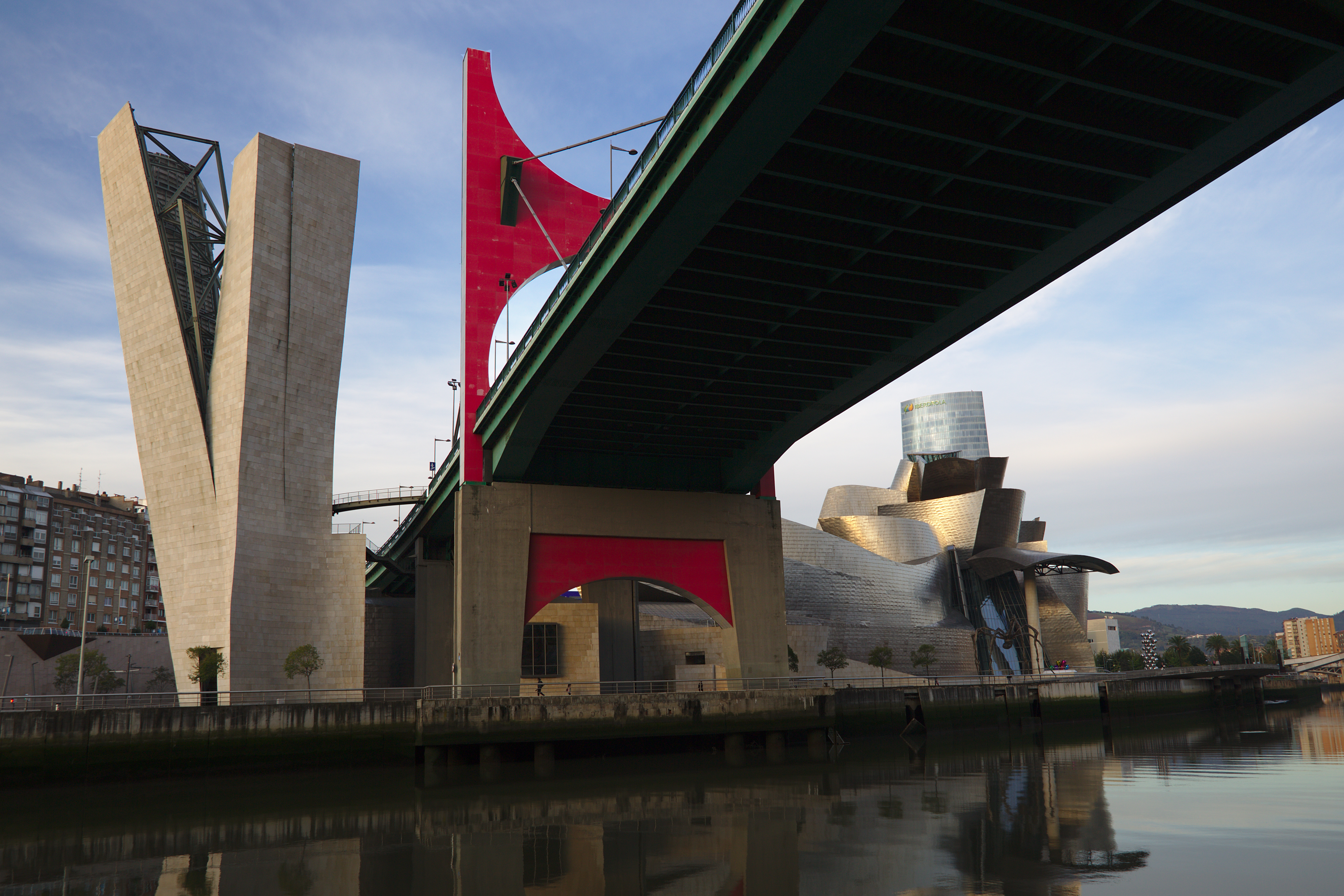
La Salve Bridge.

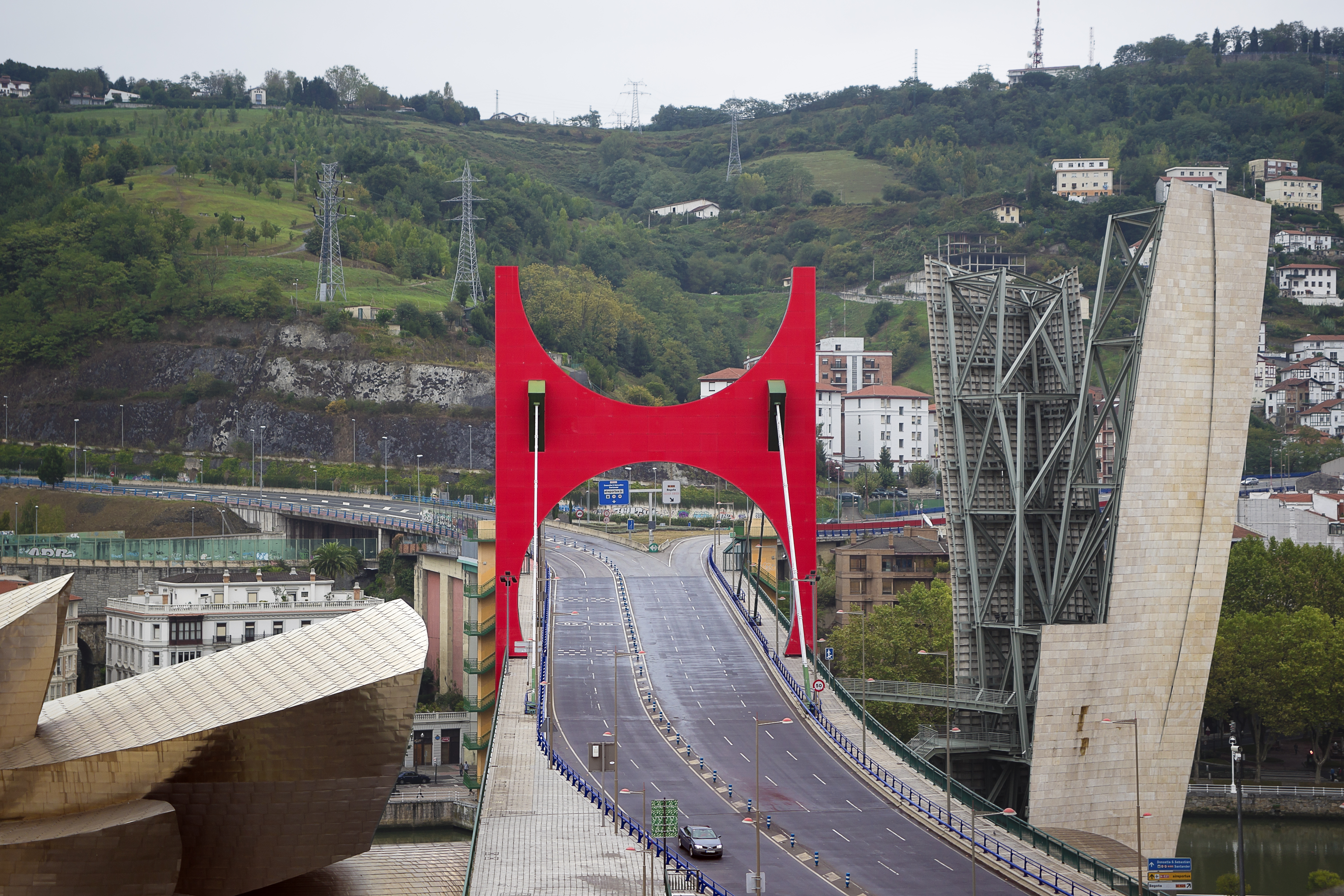
The red arc from Daniel Buren, which supports La Salve.

La Salve (Basque: Salbe) is a quarter in the 2nd district of the city of Bilbao, Spain. It gains its name from the fact that sailors, returning from sea, would first see the tower of the Basilica of Begoña at this point as ships returned up the river Nervión, which runs through the city. According to folklore, they would start praying to the Virgin Begoña, the patron saint of the region, thanking her for protecting them during their time at sea.

Today, the main landmark of the area is La Salve Bridge (Salbe Zubia), popular name for the Princes of Spain cable-stayed bridge, built in the 1970s to provide a northern access over the river to the city. This bridge gained popularity when the Guggenheim Museum Bilbao was built right under it, literally merging its structure into the museum's.
