= José Luna Meléndez =

Spanish politician

- Born: José Luna Meléndez; 1893
- Died: 1960 (aged 66–67); Madrid, Spain
- Occupation: Solicitor (from 1946)
- Known for: Politician

José Luna Meléndez (1893 – 1960) was a Spanish military colonel and politician of Falangist ideology. During the Franco dictatorship, he would come to hold the positions of Deputy Secretary General of Falange as well as attorney in the Francoist Courts.

== Biography ==
Military by profession, he reached the rank of colonel. After retiring from the army, he was one of the founding members of the Spanish Falange. He presented a candidacy for Cortes during the 1936 elections, although he did not obtain a deputy certificate. After the Falange was outlawed, he was arrested by the republican authorities and imprisoned. As the leader of the Falange de Cáceres, he gave his support to the military conspiracy against the Second Republic.

After the start of the Civil War, Luna rejoined the Falange and played a prominent role in the repression in the Extremaduran rearguard. During the war, he maintained a strong autonomous power as territorial head of the Falange in Extremadura. At the end of 1939, he was designated a member of the National Council of FET and JONS.

After the crisis of May 1941, he would be appointed Deputy Secretary General of the party, replacing the ousted Pedro Gamero del Castillo. Loyal to Ramón Serrano Suñer, during this time he stood out as an exalted Falangist. He would be removed from his posts in September 1942, after the Begoña attack, like ministers Valentín Galarza and José Enrique Varela. Despite his complete obedience to Franco, his dismissal was decided on the grounds that he had been involved in the incident. He was replaced by Manuel Mora Figueroa, a veteran of the Blue Division.

Despite his fall from grace, between 1946 and 1960, he was a solicitor in the Francoist courts.

He died in Madrid in 1960.

== Bibliography ==
- Bowen, Wayne H. (2000). Spaniards and Nazi Germany: Collaboration in the New Order. University of Missouri Press.
- Chaves Palacios, Julián (1995). La represión en la provincia de Cáceres durante la Guerra civil (1936-1939) (in Spanish). University of Extremadura.
- Chaves Palacios, Julián (2000). Violencia política y conflictividad social en Extremadura. Cáceres en 1936 (in Spanish). Diputación Provincial de Badajoz.
- Payne, Stanley G. (1997). Franco y José Antonio. El extraño caso del fascismo español (in Spanish). Planeta.
- Payne, Stanley G. (1999). Fascism in Spain, 1923–1977. University of Wisconsin.
- Preston, Paul (2013). El Holocausto Español. Odio y Exterminio en la Guerra Civil y después (in Spanish). Debolsillo.
- Suárez Fernández, Luis (2005). Franco (in Spanish). Ed Ariel.
