= Santutxu =

Coordinates: 43°15′15″N 2°54′42″W

- Neighbourhood
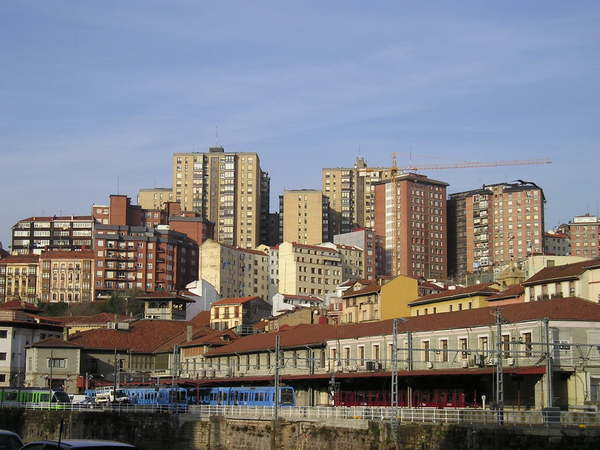
- View of Santutxu from Zamakola
- Interactive map of Santutxu
- Country: Spain
- Autonomous community: Basque Country
- Province: Biscay
- City: Bilbao
- District: Begoña

Population
  - Total: 32,881
- Demonym: Santutxutarra
- Time zone: UTC+1 (CET)
  - Summer (DST): UTC+2 (CEST)
- Postal code: 48001 – 48015
- Dialing code: +34 94
- Official language(s): Basque; Spanish

Santutxu is a neighbourhood of the Spanish city of Bilbao. It belongs to the 4th urban district, named Begoña. It is a popular residential neighbourhood which has a significant number of small businesses and has received some waves of immigration in the last years, particularly Romanians. The Begoña district consists of three neighbourhoods: Santutxu, Begoña and Bolueta.

According to research on population density, and data from the Bilbao City Council, Santutxu has the third most densely populated sq/km in Europe, with about 41.378 residents per sq/km, when considering districts of a certain size coming in third place after L'Hospitalet de Llobregat in Greater Barcelona and La Goutte d’or in Paris, neighbourhoods which have slightly more than 50.000 residents per sq/km. However, there is a popular myth among locals that Santutxu is the most densely populated neighbourhood in Europe.

== History ==
Santutxu (meaning little Saint in Basque), owes its name to a hermitage which was dedicated to Francisco de Paula. This hermitage was founded in 1737 by Francisco Fernando de Barrenechea among others, and was built with the sole purpose of enabling its colonists to hear masses without moving to Begoña church. Since both the hermitage and the Saint figure inside were small sized, it was popularly given the name Santutxu, Santuchu in Spanish. Moreover, the word Santutxu is the result of the union of two basque words, santu which means holy in basque and txu which is a diminutive suffix, also in basque.

In those first years, every second of April was celebrated in honor of San Francisco de Paula with a Major Mass of great solemnity. Representatives of the Hall of the República de Begoña would attend this event, as well as members of the clergy that would take part in every religious event back in those days, where rockets, drumming and of course, a typical homemade Basque wine named txakoli or chacolí in Spanish, were the order of the day.

In 1925, the church of Begoña was annexed (and with it, the neighbourhood of Santutxu) to Bilbao. In the 20th century it went from being a semi-rural zone with great sandlots, to a highly populated neighbourhood, especially after the building and demographic growth of the 1960s.

Luis Briñas Public school is a detached building in Santutxu, located on Iturriaga street, near the Campa de Basarrate. It is monumentally protected and was designed by the architect Pedro Ispizua Susunaga (Bermeo, 1895 - Bilbao, 1976), who also designed the del Tigre, the Mercado de la Ribera, the pergola of Parque Casilda Iturrizar or the Kiosco del Arenal.

In Santutxu, according to the Bilbao Hall census data of 2008, there are 33,346 inhabitants.

== Famous people from Santutxu ==
- Javier Salgado, player for Bilbao Basket, formerly of CB Estudiantes and Lagun Aro Bruesa Gipuzkoa Basket
- Ibai Gómez, footballer, player for Deportivo Alavés.
- Najwa Nimri, actress, musical artist.

== Events in Santutxu ==
- "Santutxu pintxotan" is a gastronomic event and contest for catering professionals from Santutxu which takes place once a year in some bars of the neighbourhood.
- "Premios Santutxu y más" is an event created by the journal of the neighbourhood to give awards to those relevant people, organisations or entities that have appeared in its pages during the last year.

== Organisations related with Santutxu ==
- Santutxu families' association, which was created in 1967.
- Santutxu FC: Santutxu football team.
- Storekeepers' association
- Begoña's teenager area: Free time area for teenagers (from 13 to 17 years) from Santutxu, Begoña and Bolueta neighbourhoods
- Social center for the Santutxu elderly
- "Bizit Santutxu": Associative project of crowdfunding, which seeks sponsorships for the neighbourhood's sports clubs, but also to foment the consumption in local shops.

== Transports ==
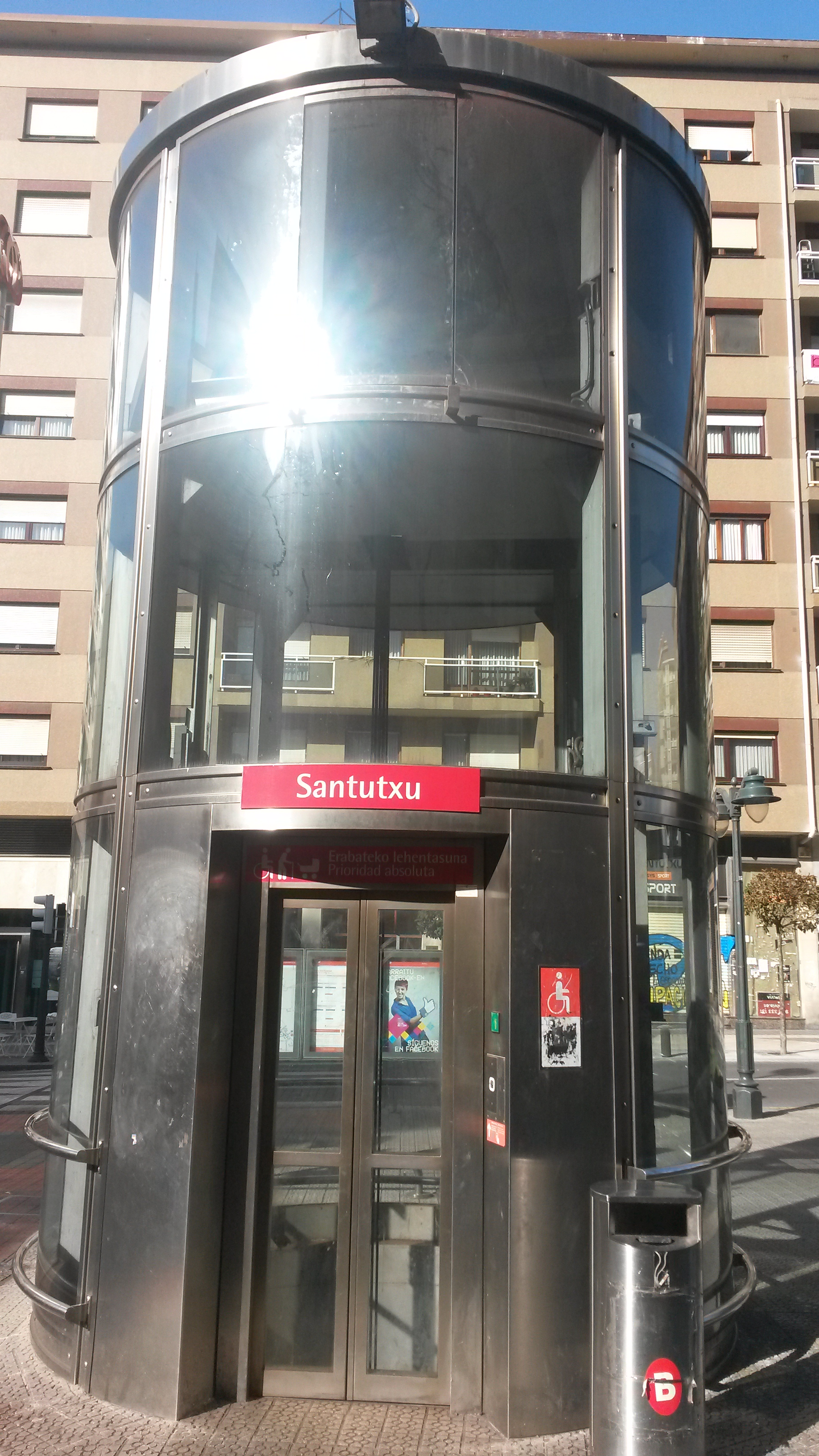
Santutxu metro station elevator

=== Bilbobus ===
Line	Itinerary	Frequency (minutes)
13	San Ignacio - Txurdinaga	15'
34	Otxarkoaga - Santutxu	30´
40	La Peña - Plaza Biribila	20´
43	Garaizar - Santutxu	30´
48	Santutxu - Lezeaga	20´
77	El Peñascal - Mina del Morro	12´

=== Bilbao Underground ===
There are two underground stations (Bilbao Metro):

- Santutxu station, which has two exits, one in Karmelo Street and another one in Zabalbide Street.
- Basarrate station which exits to Basarrate Square.
