= Basarrate (Bilbao Metro) =

Rapid transit station in Bilbao, Basque Country, Spain

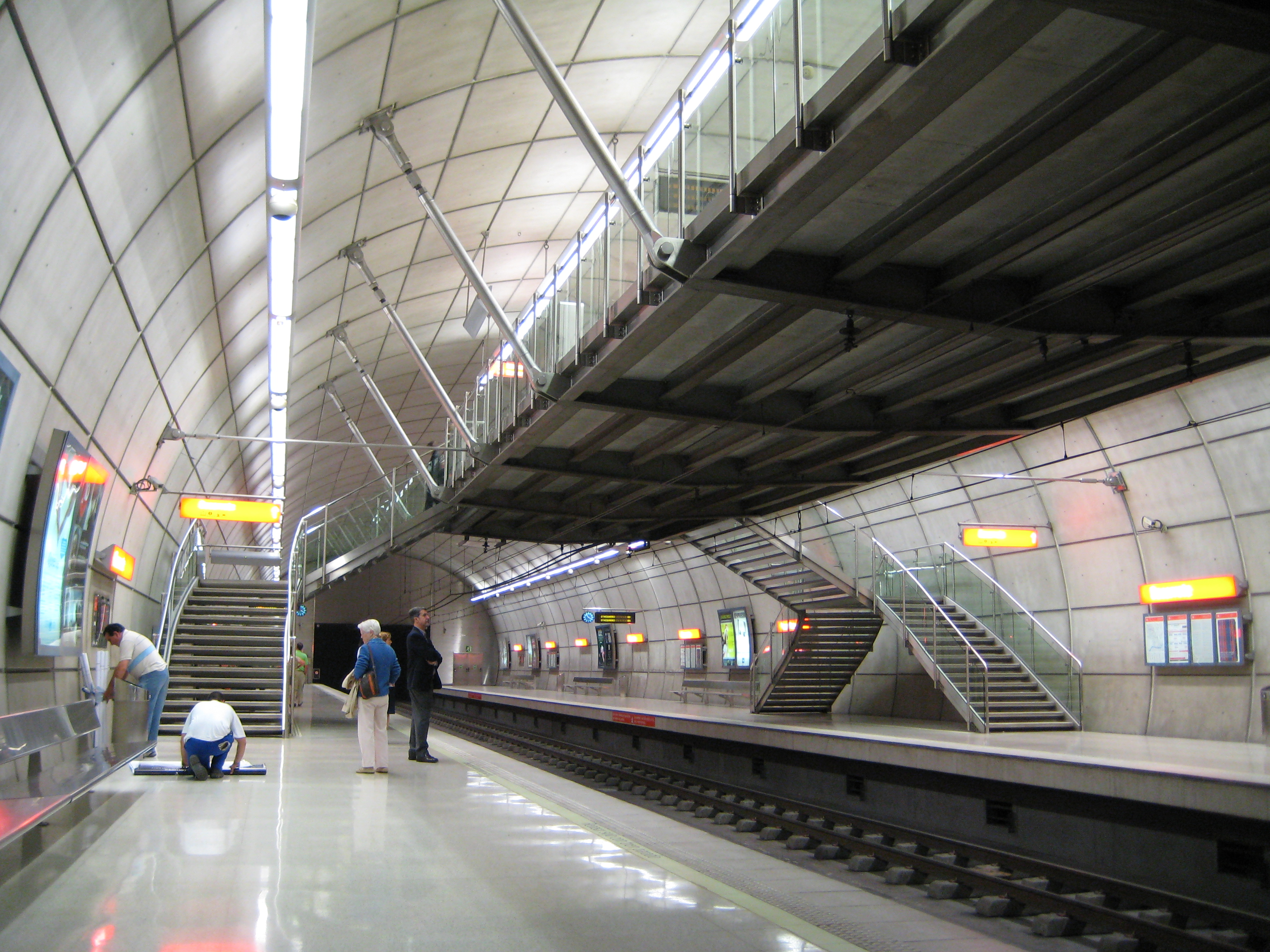
- Station interior

General information
- Location: Campa de Basarrate; 48004 Bilbao; Spain
- Coordinates: 43°15′04″N 2°54′39″W
- Owner: Biscay Transport Consortium; Euskal Trenbide Sarea
- Lines: Line 1; Line 2
- Platforms: 2 side platforms
- Tracks: 2
- Connections: Bus

Construction
- Structure type: Underground
- Platform levels: 1
- Parking: No
- Accessible: Yes

Other information
- Fare zone: Zone 1

History
- Opened: 5 July 1997

Passengers
- 2021: 1,610,660

Services
Preceding station	Metro Bilbao	Following station
Santutxu towards Plentzia	Line 1	Bolueta towards Etxebarri
Santutxu towards Kabiezes	Line 2	Bolueta towards Basauri
Location

Basarrate is a station on Lines 1 and 2 of the Bilbao Metro. The station is located in the neighborhood of Santutxu, in the district of Begoña, in Bilbao. The name of the station comes from the Campa de Basarrate (Spanish for 'Basarrate field'), as the station is located directly below it. It opened on 5 July 1997.

== Station layout ==
Basarrate station follows the typical cavern-shaped layout of most underground Metro Bilbao stations designed by Norman Foster, with the main hall located directly above the rail tracks.

=== Access ===
- 3 Pintor Losada St. - Campa de Basarrate (Basarrate exit)
- Iturriaga St. and Marqués de Laurencín St. (Ascensor Iturriaga exit)

== Services ==
The station is served by Line 1 from Etxebarri to Ibarbengoa and Plentzia, and by Line 2 from Basauri to Kabiezes. The station is located near a Bilbobus stop served by the San Ignacio-Txurdinaga (13) and Santutxu-Biribila Plaza (40) lines.
