= Begoña Fernández (mathematician) =

Mexican mathematician

María Asunción Begoña Fernández Fernández (published as Begoña Fernández) is a Mexican mathematician specializing in probability theory, stochastic processes, and mathematical finance. She is a professor of mathematics at the National Autonomous University of Mexico (UNAM).

== Education ==
Fernández studied mathematics at UNAM, graduating in 1979. She earned a master's degree in statistics and operations research in 1986, and completed her doctorate at CINVESTAV in 1990.

== Recognition ==
Fernández is a member of the Mexican Academy of Sciences.
