= Begoña =

Coordinates: 43°15′32″N 2°54′58″W

- District
- Begoña district is highlighted in blue in this map of the districts of Bilbao.

- Coat of arms
- Interactive map of Begoña
- Country: Spain
- Autonomous community: Basque Country
- Province: Biscay
- Comarca: Greater Bilbao
- Municipality: Bilbao

Area
  - Total: 1.77 km^{2} (0.68 sq mi)

Population (2016)
  - Total: 40,658
  - Density: 23,000/km^{2} (59,500/sq mi)

Begoña is a historical municipality of Biscay (Basque Country, Spain) and is a neighbourhood and urban district of Bilbao. Begoña, or more puristically but also more rarely spelled Begoina, means 'the lower foot', referring to the slopes of Mount Artxanda which lie to the north of the city.

Originally Begoña included all the uplands south and east of the medieval walled town, which now form the 2nd, 3rd, 4th and parts of the 5th urban districts of Bilbao, but was incorporated into the city in 1925.

== Begoña urban district ==
Begoña is the 4th urban district of Bilbao and lies at the eastern end of the city. It borders the 3rd district (Otxarkoaga-Txurdinaga) to the north and the 5th district (Ibaiondo) to the west and south. The district includes the neighbourhoods of Santutxu, Bolueta and Begoña proper.

== Begoña neighbourhood ==
Begoña proper is a small residential neighbourhood between the Basilica of Begoña and the garden area of Etxebarria Park. It is Flanked by the neighbourhoods of Txurdinaga to the north, Santuxtu to the south and Bilbao Old Town (Casco Viejo) to the west.

Due to its association with a church dedicated to Our Lady of Begoña, the name of the neighbourhood is also a popular name of women in the Basque Country and also in some other Spanish-speaking areas.

== Sights ==
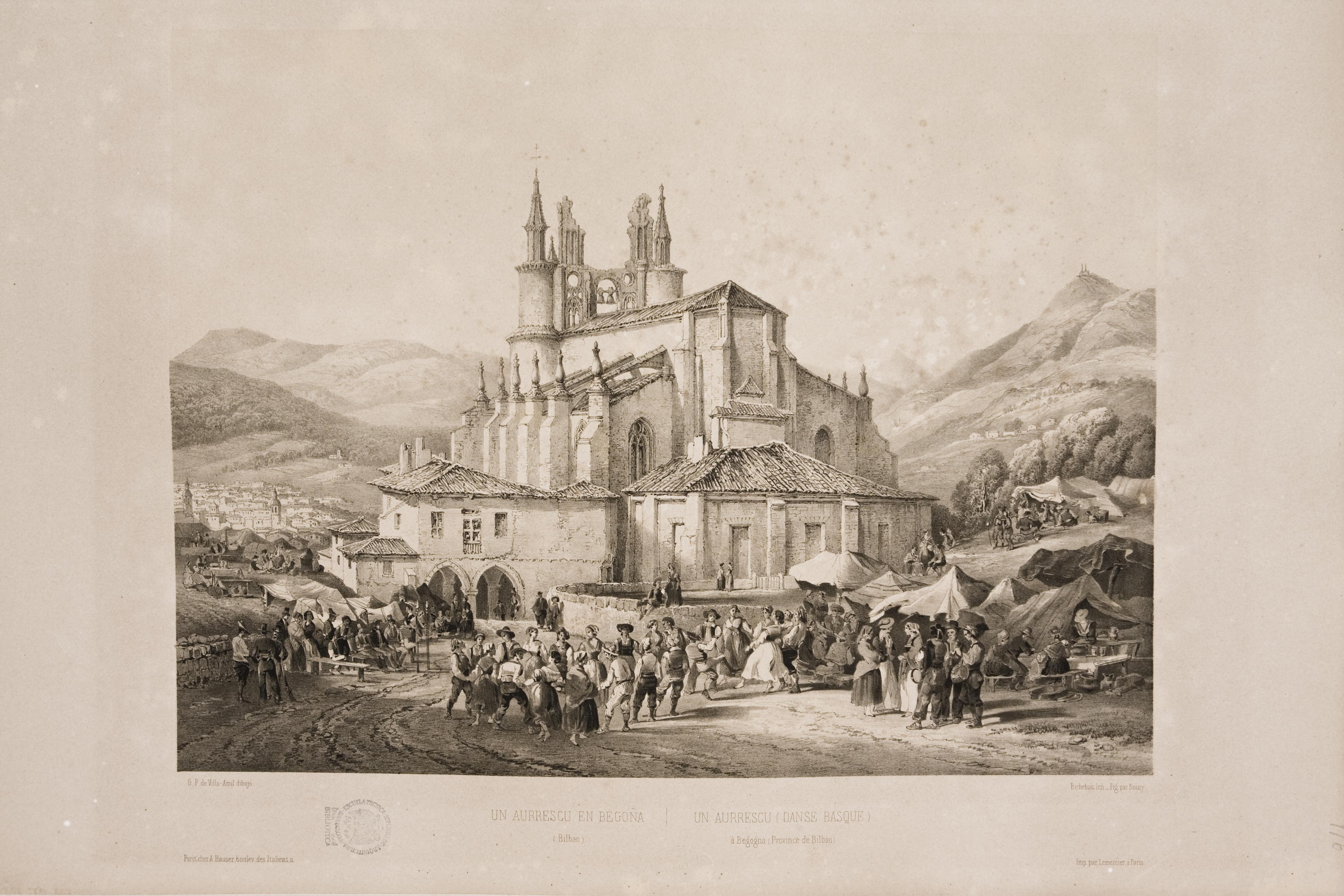
An Aurresku (a Basque dance) in Begoña. Drawing by Jenaro Pérez Villaamil and Bichebois in 1850 published in the work España artística y monumental.
