= Basilica of Begoña =

Building in Bilbao, Spain

Coordinates: 43°15′31.27″N 2°54′49.85″W

Basilica of Begoña Begoñako basilika
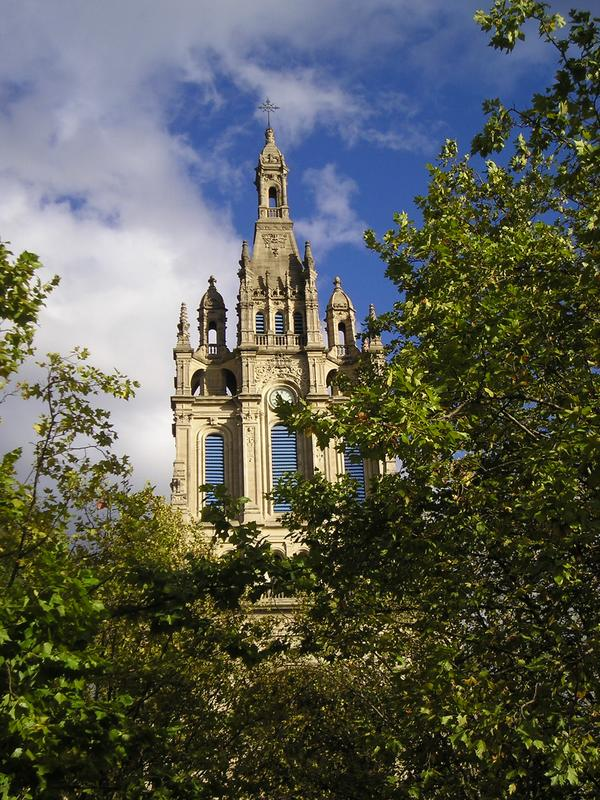
- Steeple of the basilica.

Religion
- Affiliation: Roman Catholic
- Diocese: Begoña
- Province: Biscay
- Ecclesiastical or organizational status: Parish
- Year consecrated: 16th century

Location
- Location: Bilbao, Spain
- Interactive map of Basilica of Begoña; Begoñako basilika

Architecture
- Type: Basilica
- Style: Gothic and Baroque

Specifications
- Direction of façade: West
- Spire: 1
- Materials: limestone

The Basilica of Begoña (or Basílica de Nuestra Señora de Begoña in Spanish) is a basilica in Bilbao, in Spain, dedicated to the patroness saint of Biscay, the image of Our Lady of Begoña.

The current parish priest is Jesús Francisco de Garitaonandia.

== History ==
The basilica started life in the 16th century, designed by Sancho Martínez de Arego. It has three naves, to which the addition of vaults was completed in the 17th century in construction work that took a century, having started in 1511. During the time of this work, the Gothic style began to show Renaissance influence, and the arched mid-16th century main entrance reflects the transitional style of the Spanish architect Gil de Hontañón. The remainder of the building remains purely Gothic in style.

During the 19th century, the basilica was damaged as a result of it forming part of Bilbao's city wall. The Carlist General Tomás de Zumalacárregui was fatally injured near the basilica. The current tower and part of the exterior were designed by José María Basterra and built between 1902 and 1907.

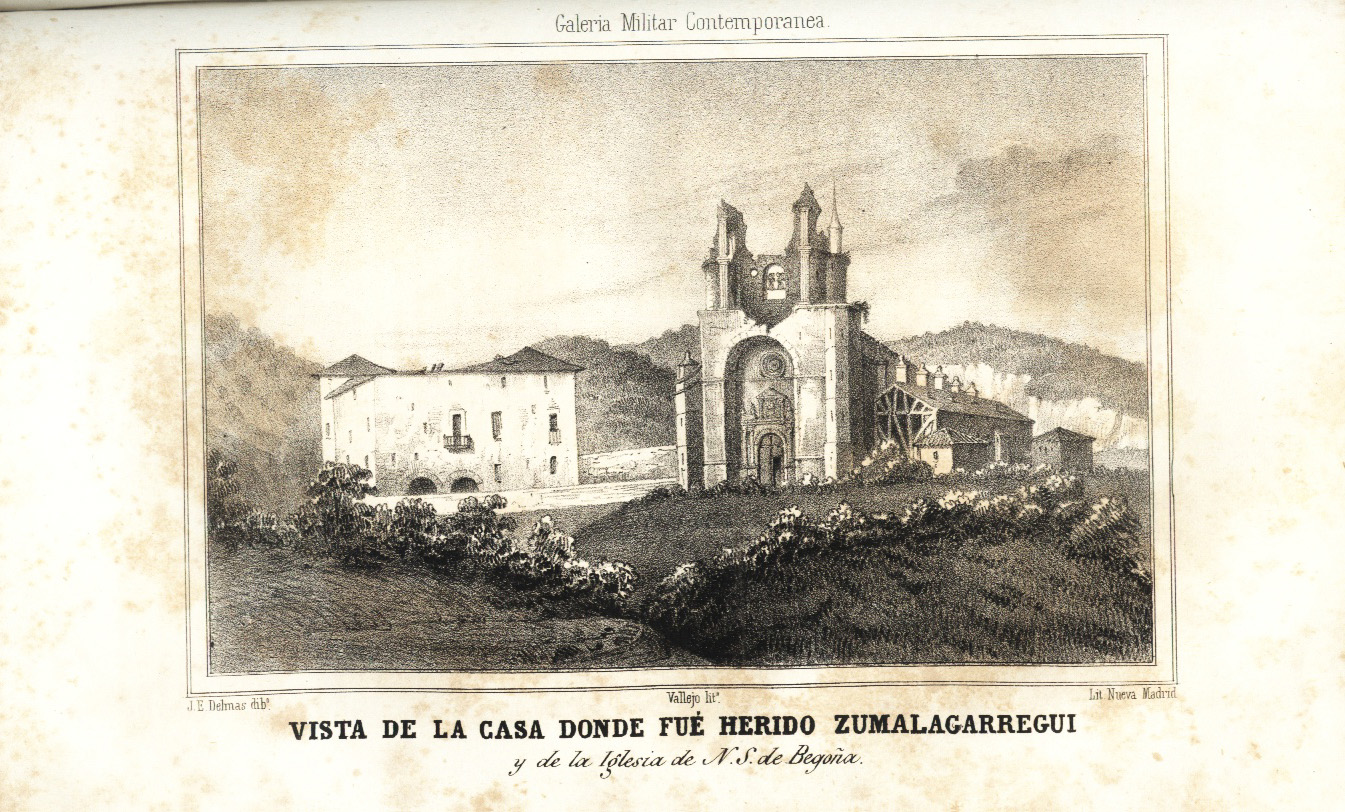
1846 rendering of the church.

On 16 August 1942, an incident between Falangists and Carlists resulted in several grenades exploding near the church. Accounts differ on number of injuries and whether any were killed, but the incident highlighted dangerous rifts between Spanish nationalist factions and prompted a restructuring of Franco's government. Six Falangists were convicted in the incident. One of them, Juan José Domínguez, was controversially sentenced to death and executed by firing squad.

Work was carried out to correct the damage, however, and from September 1993 to June 1994, extensive cleaning and restoration work was carried out on the stone and the clock face and bells were repaired. The clock tower houses 24 bells, with the heaviest weighing a tonne, and were built in Sumiswald, Switzerland. The history of the clock tower dates back to 1922, and currently, seven different melodies can be produced.

== La Salve and the basilica ==
The "La Salve" (Spanish for "salute" or "Hail Mary") quarter of Bilbao is so named because it is the first point where sailors returning up the river Nervión, which passes through the city, were able to see the basilica's steeple. As a result, they would start to pray to the Virgin Begoña here, thanking her for having looked after them during their time at sea.

== Festivities and celebrations ==
The major festivals take place every 15 August (Assumption of Mary), and 11 October, the saint day of Begoña. Midnight mass is celebrated on these occasions, with pilgrimages taking place as locals and visitors go to worship.

According to the basilica's website, many sailors still remember the significance of the building, with "Virgen de Begoña" or "Begoña" being popular names among fleets.

The basilica is open to the public from Monday to Friday, 9:30am to 1:30pm and 4:30pm to 8:30pm.

== See also ==
- List of carillons
