= Our Lady of Begoña =

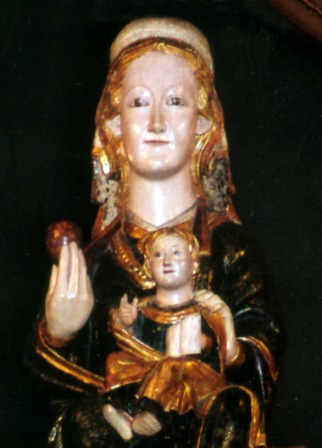
- Our Lady of Begoña
- Venerated in: Roman Catholic Church
- Major shrine: Basilica of Begoña
- Feast: 11 October
- Patronage: Biscay

The cult of Our Lady of Begoña (Nuestra Señora de Begoña, la Madre de Dios de Begoña) celebrates an apparition of the Virgin Mary at the site of the Basilica of Begoña, in Bilbao, Spain. Affectionately called "Amatxu" (meaning "little mother" in Basque), she is said to have appeared to local people in the early 16th century. The feast day of Our Lady of Begoña is 11 October.

== History ==
The title was established in Bilbao, at Biscay, Spain where, according to local legend, an 8th-century statue of Our Lady was found the hollow of an oak tree on Mount Artagan. In 1672, the Lord of Vizcaya published an engraving of the Virgin along with his coat of arms.

The Basque Country has a long tradition of fishing and seafaring. Basque ship captains travelled regularly to the ports of France, England, the Netherlands and Ireland. Since the 15th century many boats out of Bilbao have carried the name, Virgin of Begoña or simply Begoña. In 1779 Captain Jaun Bautista de Ajeo and two other Bilbao merchants owned a ship, with a capacity of fifty tons, known as Nuestra Senora de Begoña. Votives left by sailors indicate that Our Lady of Begoña is believed to have helped seamen in distress, who then offered thanks for their safe deliverance.

Tradition tells of an apparition to the people of Bilbao at the site of the present Basilica. Work began on the basilica in 1511. Behind the high altar is what is referred to as "the Virgin's chamber". She is credited with helping to stem the cholera epidemic of 1855.

== Description ==
The image, made of linden wood, depicts the Blessed Mother seated in an armless chair wearing a crown, and holding the Child Jesus on her knees, with a red rose in her right hand. Christ is giving a blessing with his right hand and holds and open book in his left. The statue appears to be from the early 14th century, and may have been donated the church by Diego Lopez de Haro, Lord of Biscay, or one of his predecessors.

== Veneration ==
In 1900 Our Lady of Begoña received a gold crown during a Pontifical Mass attended by the Apostolic Delegate. In 1903 Pius X declared her the patron saint of Biscay. In 1908 Pius X raised the shrine of Our Lady of Begoña to a minor Basilica.

The annual Feria de Nuestra Senora de Begoña has been an important August stop for toreros for a long time.

In the summer of 2012, when many of Spain's politicians attended religious services invoking Mary under various titles, for help with the country's deepening economic crisis, Mayor of Bilbao, Inaki Azkuna, prayed to Our Lady of Begoña. "“Those of us who are believers continue to believe that we could be given some help and that we need it. All of society, and not only politicians, is going to have to make a tremendous effort,” he added."

== See also ==
- Basilica of Begoña
