= Euskotren rolling stock =

Trains operated by Euskotren

Euskotren is a public railway operator in the Basque Country, Spain. Its rolling stock is formed by electrical multiple units used for Euskotren Trena commuter rail services, trams running on the Bilbao and Vitoria-Gasteiz tramway networks, and locomotives for hauling freight trains.

== Current and future ==
=== Electrical multiple units ===
Class	Image	In service	Number	Notes
900 series		2011–present	30	EMUs composed of four cars, with a top speed of 90 km/h (56 mph). The first were introduced in 2011, operating services on the Topo (San Sebastián Metro) line. A total of 30 units were delivered between 2011 and 2014 to replace the 3500 series trains. Currently, they operate services throughout the network.
940 series		2023–present	4	A series of four trains ordered by Euskotren in 2021. They are similar to the 950 series trains but have four cars instead of three.
950 series		2016–present	28	A series of 28 EMUs, delivered between 2016 and 2018. They are similar to the 900 series trains, but have three cars instead of four. The first trains started operating services on the Txorierri line, and gradually replaced the 200 and 300 series trains. Now, they also run local services between Eibar and Ermua, on the Urdaibai line, and on Line 3 of the Bilbao Metro.
980 series			5	Five trains ordered in 2023. They will be similar in size to the 900 and 940 series trains, but they will feature three powered cars instead of two. They are intended for use in Line 5 of the Bilbao Metro.

=== Locomotives ===
Class	Image	In service	Number	Notes
TD2000 series		2009–present	12	A series of 12 electro-diesel locomotives, built for hauling freight trains. Due to lack of use, one of the locomotives was leased to FGC from 2012 to 2017. In 2015, three of the locomotives were sold to FE EP, the national railway of Ecuador.

=== Trams ===
Class	Image	Number	In service	Notes
400 series (CAF Urbos 1)		8	2002–present	The 400 series consists of 8 vehicles (numbered 401-408), built for the Bilbao network. The trams are 24.4 m (80 ft) long, have 70% low floor access and are made up of three cars. Each tram can carry 196 passengers. They are the only CAF Urbos 1 trams to have been built.
500 series (CAF Urbos 2)		11	2008–present	The 500 series consists of 11 vehicles (numbered 501-511), originally built for the Vitoria-Gasteiz network. The trams are 31.4 m (103 ft) long, have 100% low floor access and are made up of five cars. Each tram can carry 261 passengers. Due to the introduction of the larger 600 series in Vitoria-Gasteiz, three vehicles have been transferred to Bilbao.
600 series (CAF Urbos 3)		7	2020–present	The 600 series consists of 7 vehicles (numbered 601-607), built for the Vitoria-Gasteiz network. The trams are 44.2 m (145 ft) long, have 100% low floor access and are made up of seven cars. Each tram can carry 398 passengers.

== Retired ==
When Euskotren (known at the time as Basque Railways) was founded in 1982, it inherited the rolling stock FEVE had been using in the Basque Country until then. However, most of FEVE's rolling stock had previously been operated by different private companies, notably Ferrocarriles Vascongados and FTS. Rolling stock acquired during the FEVE years (1972 to 1982) and since the creation of Euskotren (1982 to present) is listed under the section newly built and inherited from FEVE. Rolling stock built for Ferrocarriles Vascongados and FTS before 1972 is listed under different sections.

=== Newly built and inherited from FEVE ===
Class	Image	Type	In service	Number	Notes
200 series		EMU	1986–2018	20	The 200 series EMUs were built by CAF, Babcock & Wilcox and Westinghouse in 1985. They replaced the trains that Euskotren had inherited from its predecessor Ferrocarriles y Transportes Suburbanos (FTS) on the Bilbao-Plentzia line. After that line was incorporated into Line 1 of the Bilbao Metro in 1995, the 200 series trains operated services throughout the Euskotren network. The trains originally had three cars, but all were added a fourth one between 1996 and 1999. The last trains were withdrawn from service in late 2018.
300 series		EMU	1990–2018	12	The 300 series EMUs were built in by CAF and Babcock & Wilcox in 1990. These two car trains were conceived to substitute the 3500 series trains on the Topo (Metro Donostialdea) line; but some of them were used (painted in red) between 1998 and 1999 for the Euskopullman service, a limited express service between Bilbao-Atxuri and San Sebastián. After the inauguration of the Line 1 of the Bilbao Metro in 1995, 200 series trains started operating services on the Topo line. As a consequence, 300 series trains were reassigned to the Txorierri and Urdaibai lines.
3000 series		EMU	1958–1990	3	Three permanent multiple units composed of a former FEVE 3000 series railcar, a 5000 series non-powered car, and a 6000 series control car.
3500 series		EMU	1978–2013	15	The 3500 series was originally built for FEVE, entering service in 1978. Of the thirty one trains that constituted the series, fifteen (eleven of them with three cars, the rest of them with four) were transferred to Euskotren. Replaced by the 900 series, their last service was on 6 July 2013.

=== Inherited from Ferrocarriles Vascongados ===
Class	Image	Type	In service	Number	Notes
1-10 (Brown Boveri)		Electric locomotive	1928–1999	10	A series of ten electric locomotives, originally operated by Ferrocarriles Vascongados. Later operated by FEVE and Euskotren.
11-14 (ASEA)		Electric locomotive	1931–2016	4	Four electric locomotives bought by Ferrocarriles Vascongados to supplement the Brown Boveri locomotives.
15-17 (ASEA)		Electric locomotive	1950–2010	3	Three electric locomotives built in 1950. Mechanically similar to the older ASEA locomotives, they featured a more modern exterior design.
3150 series		Railcar	1962–1997	4	Originally built for Ferrocarriles Vascongados in the 1960s. After Ferrocarriles Vascongados was absorbed by FEVE, they were renumbered as the 3150 series.

=== Inherited from FTS ===
Class	Image	Type	In service	Number	Notes
3100 series		EMU	1965–2005	8	These EMUs were originally built between 1965 and 1975 as the Ferrocarriles y Transportes Suburbanos 100 series. They were refurbished between 1988 and 1991. They were withdrawn from service in 1998. Units 3107 and 3108 remained in reserve in Eibar until their definitive retirement in 2005.
