= Ganz railcar (Ferrocarriles Vascongados, long version) =

Railcar operated by Ferrocarriles Vascongados

Ganz railcar (long version)
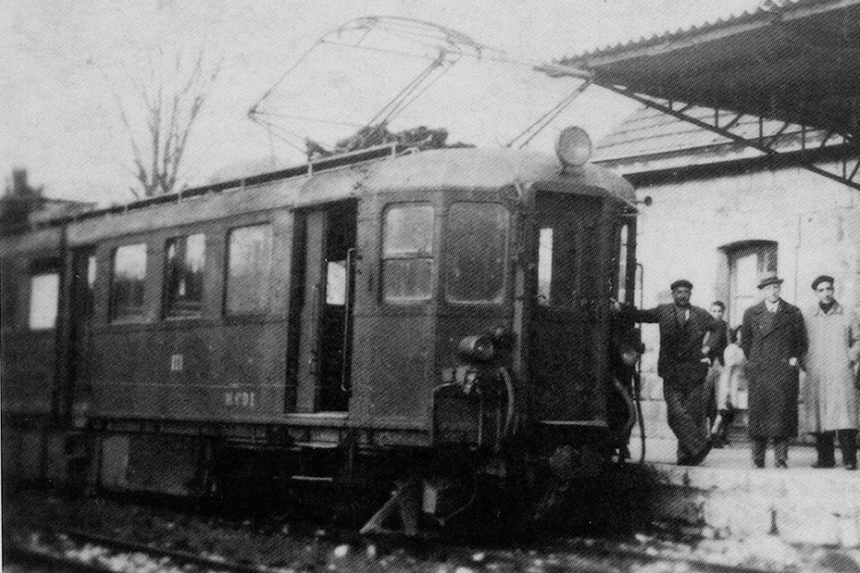
- A Ganz railcar during the first day of electric service to Elorrio
- In service: 1928–1981
- Manufacturer: Ganz
- Built at: Budapest, Hungary
- Constructed: 1928–1930
- Number built: 9
- Number preserved: 1
- Number scrapped: 8
- Fleet numbers: MCD 1–9
- Capacity: 44 (seated)
- Operators: Ferrocarriles Vascongados; FEVE

Specifications
- Train length: 16.5 m (54 ft 2 in)
- Power output: 412 hp (307 kW) (original); 640 hp (480 kW) (reengined)
- Electric system: 1,500 V DC overhead line
- Current collection: Pantograph
- Track gauge: 1,000 mm (3 ft 3 3/8 in)

The long Ganz railcar is a railcar train type formerly operated by Ferrocarriles Vascongados in the Basque Country, Spain from 1928 to 1981.

== History ==
Due to an increase in traffic, Ferrocarriles Vascongados decided in the 1920s to electrify its main line between Bilbao and San Sebastián. Thus, the company ordered six railcars to be used for hauling passenger trains with up to seven cars. They were built by Ganz in its Budapest factory in 1928, and numbered MCD 1–6. As the six railcars were not enough to satisfy the growing demand, three identical railcars were built in 1930, numbered MCD 7–9. Unlike most railcars of the time, they were constructed in metal.

In 1941, the company decided to reengine some of the railcars. The new engines were built by CENEMESA in Reinosa. However, due to problems with their design, the first batch wasn't delivered until 1944, and the first reengined railcars entered service in 1948. The reengined railcars were those numbered MCD 3–9. With the new engines, the maximum load that could be hailed increased from 90 t (198,416 lb) to 125 t (275,578 lb).

The long Ganz railcars were in regular service until the mid-1970s. By 1979, the only remaining train was MCD 1, used at the time to operate services between Bilbao-Atxuri and Usansolo. Until 1981, it operated cross-border shuttle services between Irun and Hendaye. It was stored in Durango and later Gernika until 1989, when it was sent to Azpeitia for preservation at the Basque Railway Museum. However, it hasn't been restored yet and remains under storage.

== See also ==
- Ferrocarriles Vascongados § Rolling stock
