= ASEA electric locomotive (Ferrocarriles Vascongados, later version) =

Electric locomotive formerly operated by Ferrocarriles Vascongados, FEVE and Euskotren

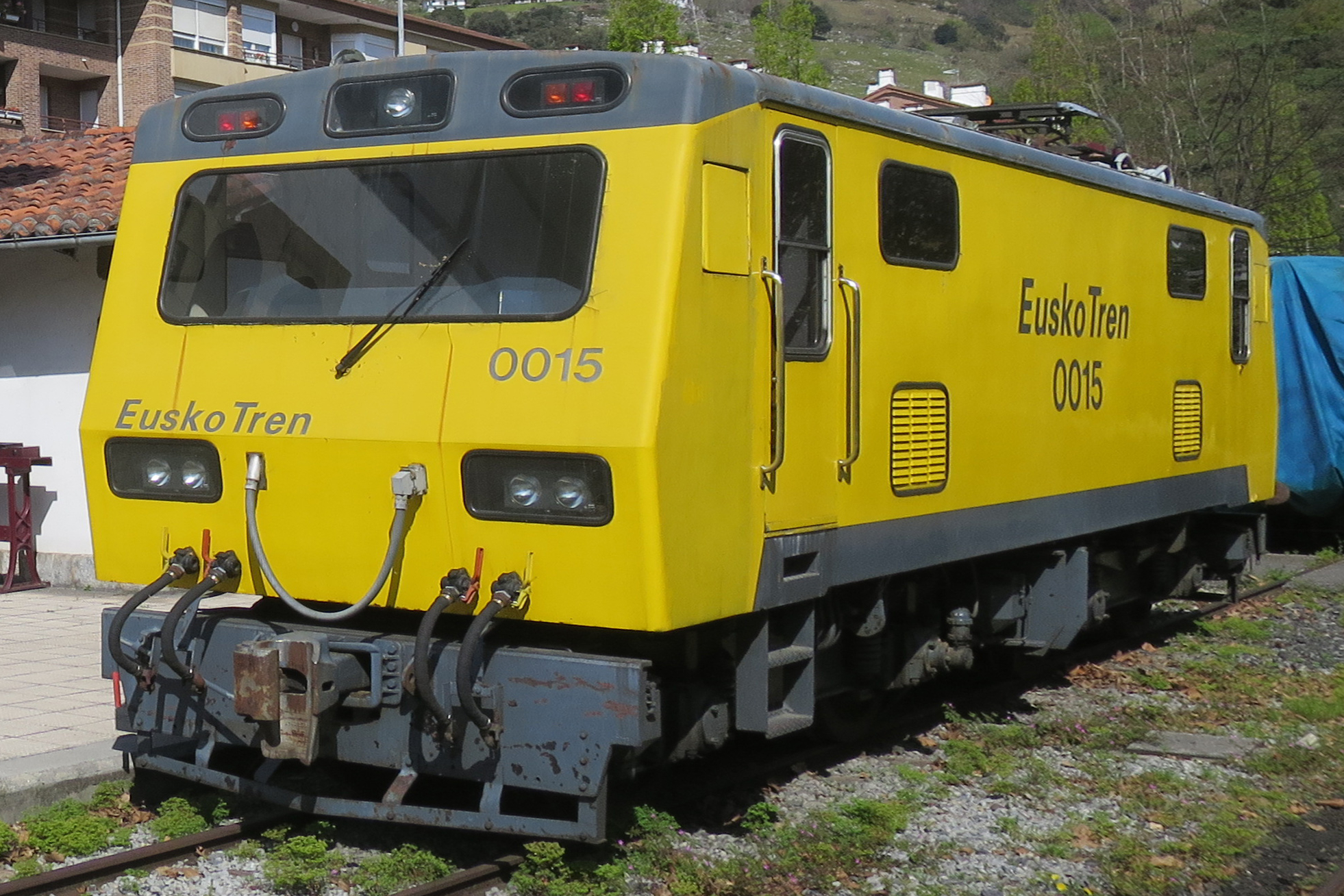
- Locomotive 15, preserved at the Basque Railway Museum
Type and origin
- Power type: Electric
- Builder: ASEA
- Build date: 1950
- Total produced: 3
Specifications
- Configuration
  - AAR: B-B
  - UIC: Bo′Bo′
- Gauge: 1,000 mm (3 ft 3 3/8 in)
- Length: 10.85 m (35 ft 7 in)
- Width: 2.5 m (8 ft 2 in)
- Height: 3.35 m (11 ft 0 in)
- Axle load: 11,000 kg (24,251 lb)
- Loco weight: 44,000 kg (97,003 lb)
- Electric system/s: 1,500 V DC overhead line
- Current pickup: Pantograph
- Traction motors: 4× ASEA LJ-63
- Loco brake: Vacuum
Performance figures
- Maximum speed: 70 km/h (43 mph)
- Power output
  - Continuous: 530 kW (711 hp)
Career
- Operators: Ferrocarriles Vascongados, FEVE, Euskotren
- Delivered: 1950
- Retired: 2010

The ASEA electric locomotive was an electric locomotive type originally operated by Ferrocarriles Vascongados in the Basque Country, Spain. When that company was absorbed by FEVE, it came to be known as the FEVE 4200 series. It was later operated by Euskotren.

== History ==
In the aftermath of the Spanish Civil War, Ferrocarriles Vascongados experienced a surge in passenger and freight traffic. As a result, the company ordered three locomotives to ASEA, which had manufactured four electric locomotives for Ferrocarriles Vascongados in the early 1930s. The three new locomotives were mechanically very similar to the older ones, but featured a more modern exterior design. Unlike the previous locomotives, whose mechanical parts were built by CAF in Beasain, Spain; the new ones were built entirely by ASEA in Västerås, Sweden. As of 2005, they were the last narrow-gauge electric locomotives to have been imported into Spain.

After the original operator was absorbed into FEVE in 1972, the locomotives were renumbered as 4201 to 4203. This period saw a decline in freight traffic which coupled with the retirement of some multiple unit types meant the 4200 series (as well as the 4000 and 4100 series) was increasingly used to haul local train services. After the establishment of Euskotren in 1982 (known at the time as ET/FV), they were transferred to the new company. After 1988 they were retired from passenger service, and were used exclusively as shunters. Between 1994 and 1995, the three locomotives were refurbished in Gernika. As part of the refurbishment, their exterior was reformed, they were fitted with Alliance couplers and their cabins were made similar to the ones used by 200 series trains. They were retired from service in 2010.

== Numbering and naming ==
The locomotives were named after mountains of the Basque Country. Their individual details are as follows.

FV No.	FEVE No.	Name	ASEA No.	Retired	Fate
15	4201	Amboto	1270	2010	Donated to the Basque Railway Museum in 2011.
16	4202	Oiz	1271	2010	Scrapped.
17	4203	Udalaitz	1272	2010	Scrapped.

== See also ==
- Ferrocarriles Vascongados § Rolling stock
