= Ganz railcar (Ferrocarriles Vascongados, short version) =

Railcar operated by Ferrocarriles Vascongados

Ganz railcar (short version)
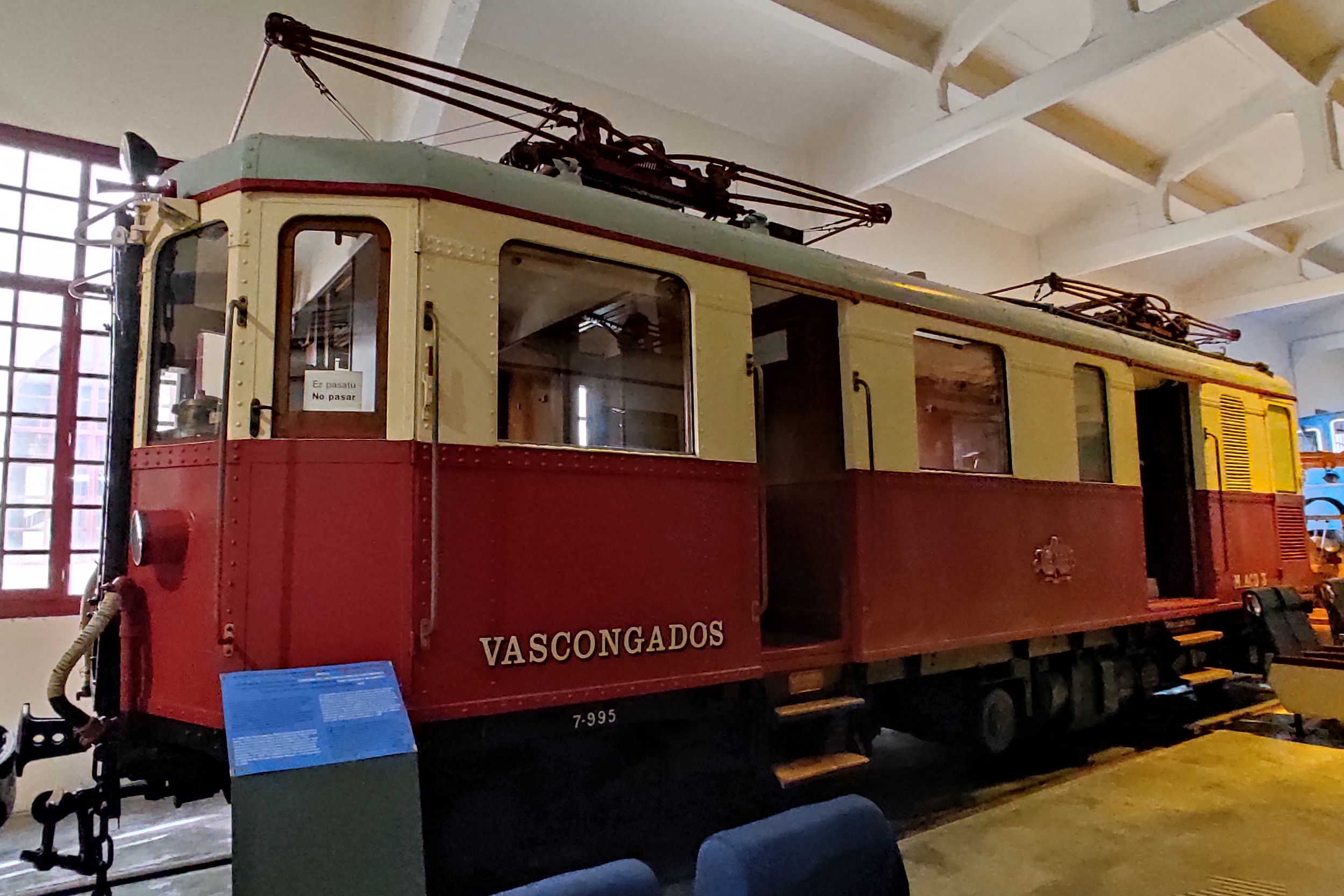
- A preserved Ganz railcar at the Basque Railway Museum
- In service: 1928–1980
- Manufacturer: Ganz
- Built at: Budapest, Hungary
- Constructed: 1928
- Number built: 5
- Number preserved: 1
- Number scrapped: 4
- Fleet numbers: MACD 1–5
- Capacity: 14 (seated)
- Operators: Ferrocarriles Vascongados; FEVE

Specifications
- Train length: 11.225 m (36 ft 9.9 in)
- Width: 2.45 m (8 ft 0 in)
- Height: 3.67 m (12 ft 0 in)
- Power output: 412 hp (307 kW)
- Electric system: 1,500 V DC overhead line
- Current collection: Pantograph
- Track gauge: 1,000 mm (3 ft 3 3/8 in)

The short Ganz railcar is a railcar train type formerly operated by Ferrocarriles Vascongados in the Basque Country, Spain from 1928 to 1981.

== History ==
Due to an increase in traffic, Ferrocarriles Vascongados decided in the 1920s to electrify most of its network. A series of six railcars was ordered to Ganz in 1928 for use in the Bilbao–San Sebastián line. However, these trains were too long to negotiate the tight curves in the Deba railway, so Ferrocarriles Vascongados bought another five railcars from Ganz. These railcars were mechanically identical to the other series, but were noticeably shorter. They were numbered MACD 1–5. Unlike most railcars of the time, they were constructed in metal.

With their original mechanical systems, they could haul 75 t (165,347 lb) and 60 t (132,277 lb) of cargo along the Santa Marina and Deskarga mountain passes, the steepest in the network. In the 1940s, three of them (MCD 3, 4 and 5) had their gear ratios modified. This lowered their top speed, but their hauling capacity increased to 135 t (297,624 lb) and 100 t (220,462 lb) respectively.

After the introduction of second hand Alsthom railcars in 1951, the short Ganz railcars were relegated to shunting services. By 1979, the only remaining unit was MACD 3 in Durango. It was put in storage there in 1980, and was later moved to Gernika. In 1989 it was selected for preservation at the Basque Railway Museum, and in 1995 it was restored by CAF in its Irun facilities.

== See also ==
- Ferrocarriles Vascongados § Rolling stock
