= ASEA electric locomotive (Ferrocarriles Vascongados, early version) =

Electric locomotive formerly operated by Ferrocarriles Vascongados, FEVE and Euskotren

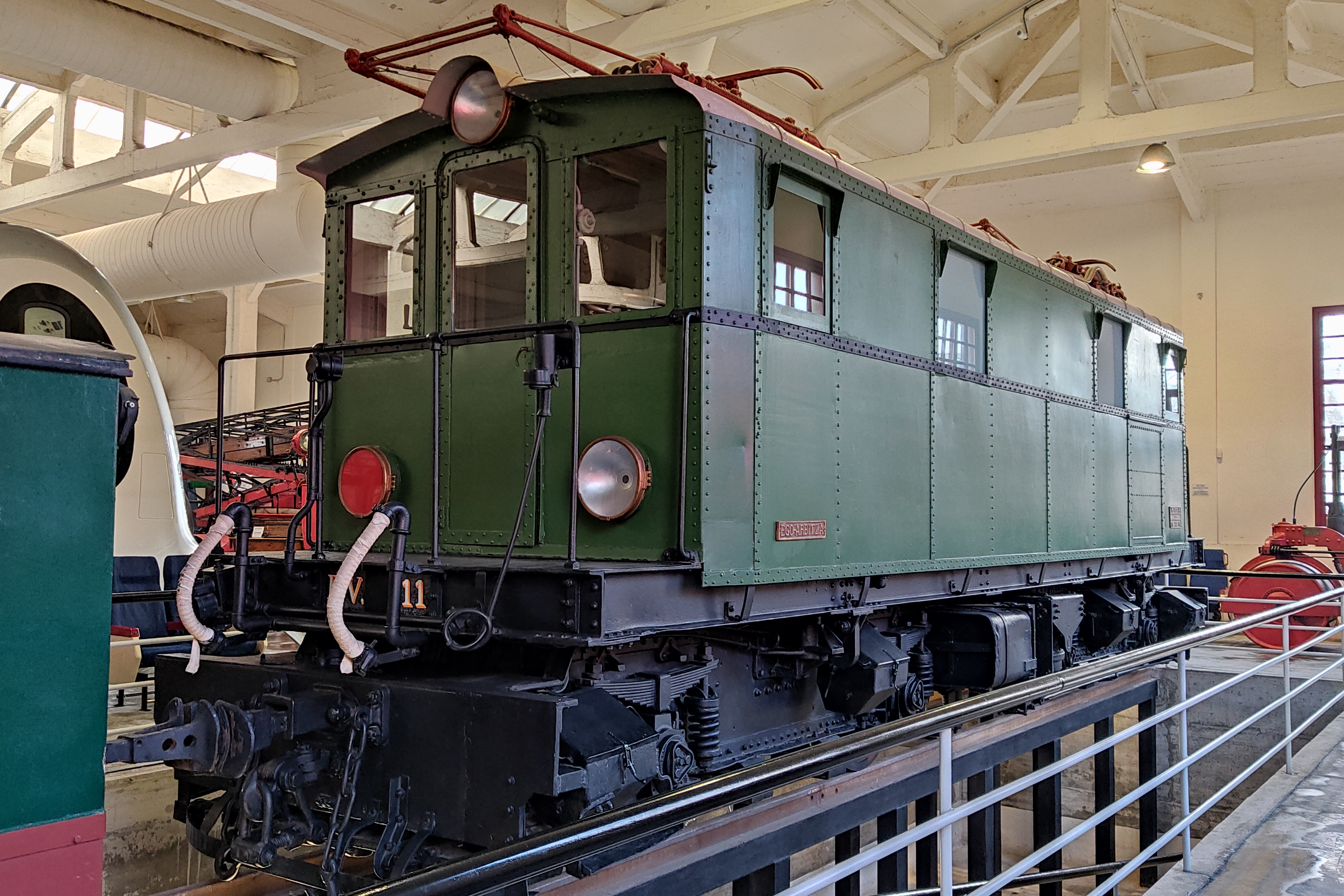
- Locomotive 11, preserved at the Basque Railway Museum
Type and origin
- Power type: Electric
- Builder: ASEA, CAF
- Build date: 1931–1932
- Total produced: 4
Specifications
- Configuration
  - AAR: B-B
  - UIC: Bo′Bo′
- Gauge: 1,000 mm (3 ft 3 3/8 in)
- Length: 10.58 m (34 ft 9 in)
- Width: 2.49 m (8 ft 2 in)
- Height: 3.4 m (11 ft 2 in)
- Axle load: 10,750 kg (23,700 lb)
- Loco weight: 43,000 kg (94,799 lb)
- Electric system/s: 1,500 V DC overhead line
- Current pickup: Pantograph
- Loco brake: Vacuum
Performance figures
- Power output
  - Continuous: 530 kW (711 hp)
Career
- Operators: Ferrocarriles Vascongados, FEVE, Euskotren
- Delivered: 1931
- Retired: 2016

The ASEA electric locomotive was an electric locomotive type originally operated by Ferrocarriles Vascongados in the Basque Country, Spain. When that company was absorbed by FEVE, it came to be known as the FEVE 4100 series. It was later operated by Euskotren.

== History ==
Ferrocarriles Vascongados had bought ten Brown Boveri electric locomotives in 1927. These were insufficient to haul all the freight trains operated by the company, and thus four new locomotives were ordered to Swedish manufacturer ASEA. The mechanical parts were built by Spanish manufacturer CAF in Beasain. The first two locomotives were delivered in 1931, and the remaining two in 1932. Due to the company's liquidity problems, eleven of its steam locomotives had to be mortgaged. In 1950, the company bought from ASEA another three locomotives which were mechanically similar to the ones delivered in the early 1930s.

After the original operator was absorbed into FEVE in 1972, the locomotives were renumbered as 4101 to 4104. It was during this time that the locomotives had their original axleboxes changed by new ones manufactured by Timken, the most significant overhaul during their lifetime. After the establishment of Euskotren in 1982 (known at the time as ET/FV), they were transferred to the new company. They were mostly retired from service in 1989, when two of the locomotives were scrapped and a third was stored for preservation. The fourth locomotive was refurbished with the addition of a Scharfenberg coupler and a Faiveley pantograph. It was in use as a shunter in the San Sebastián-Hendaye line until in 2016, when it was donated to the Basque Railway Museum.

== Numbering and naming ==
The locomotives were named after mountains of the Basque Country. Their individual details are as follows.

FV No.	FEVE No.	Name	ASEA No.	Retired	Fate
11	4101	Ego-Arbitza	706	1989	Restored in 1995 by the Basque Railway Museum.
12	4102	Izarraitz	707	2016	Refurbished in 1989 for use as a shunter in the San Sebastián-Hendaye line. Donated to the Basque Railway Museum in 2016.
13	4103	Amo	708	1989	Scrapped.
14	4104	Mandoia	709	1989	Scrapped.

== See also ==
- Ferrocarriles Vascongados § Rolling stock
