= Euskotren 3150 series =

Railcar operated by Euskotren

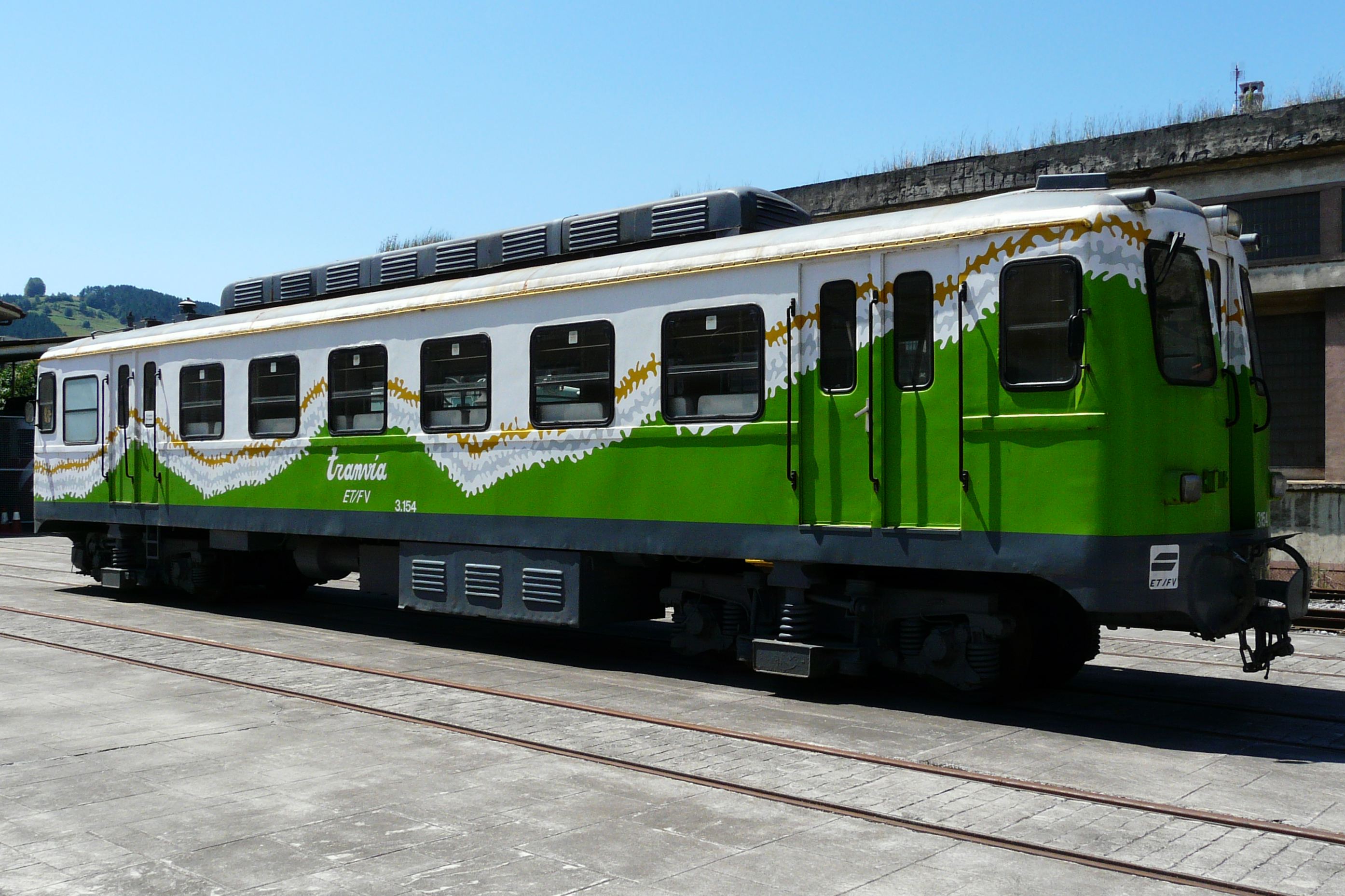
- A preserved 3150 series train
- In service: 1962–1997
- Manufacturer: Ferrocarriles Vascongados
- Built at: Durango, Spain
- Constructed: 1959–1967
- Refurbished: 1985; 1989–1990
- Number built: 4
- Number in service: 1
- Number preserved: 1
- Number scrapped: 2
- Fleet numbers: 3151–3154
- Capacity: 40 (seated); 124 (total)
- Operators: Ferrocarriles Vascongados; FEVE; Euskotren

Specifications
- Train length: 16,100 mm (52 ft 10 in)
- Width: 2,500 mm (8 ft 2 in)
- Height: 3,450 mm (11 ft 4 in)
- Doors: 2 (per side)
- Maximum speed: 70 km/h (43 mph)
- Electric system(s): 1,500 V DC overhead line
- Current collection: Pantograph
- UIC classification: Bo'Bo'
- Track gauge: 1,000 mm (3 ft 3 3/8 in)

The Euskotren 3150 series is a railcar train type formerly operated by Euskotren in the Basque Country, Spain. Originally built in the 1960s by Ferrocarriles Vascongados, the series was retired from passenger service in 1997. A refurbished unit, known as Trenbiker, is operated by Euskal Trenbide Sarea as a track geometry car.

== History ==
Starting in 1942, railway operator Ferrocarriles Vascongados gradually rebuilt some of its wooden passenger cars in metal. With the acquired experience, the company decided in 1958 to build its own rolling stock in its Durango maintenance facilities. In total, four railcars were built, the first one entering service in 1962 and the last one in 1967. The electric components were built by General Electric Española and the bogies by Alsthom. The first two trains (numbered MCD14 and MCD15) were used for hauling the Pullman service between Bilbao and San Sebastián, while the other two (MCD16 and MCD17) were used on suburban services between Bilbao and Durango. After Ferrocarriles Vascongados was merged into FEVE in 1972, the trains were renumbered as the 3150 series, keeping their original order. When Euskotren was established to operate narrow gauge services in the Basque Country, they were transferred to the new company.

In 1984, train 3153 was damaged in a fire, and was later scrapped. In 1985, the first two trains were refurbished and had their interiors adapted for suburban services. Between 1989 and 1990, all surviving units were refurbished again for the tranvía local service between Ermua and Eibar. In their final role, the trains were painted in a white and green color scheme, which gained them the nickname "Kiwis". The 3150 series trains were retired from passenger service in 1997 due to lack of capacity.

In 1999, train 3151 was converted into a track geometry car, known as Trenbiker. Since 2006 Trenbiker has been operated by Euskal Trenbide Sarea, a company established to manage the tracks on which Euskotren trains run. Train 3152 served as a relief train for some years, before being scrapped in 2007, while train 3154 has been preserved by the Basque Railway Museum.

== See also ==
- Euskotren rolling stock
- Ferrocarriles Vascongados § Rolling stock
