= Ferrocarriles Vascongados =

Former railway operator

Compañía de Ferrocarriles Vascongados, S.A.
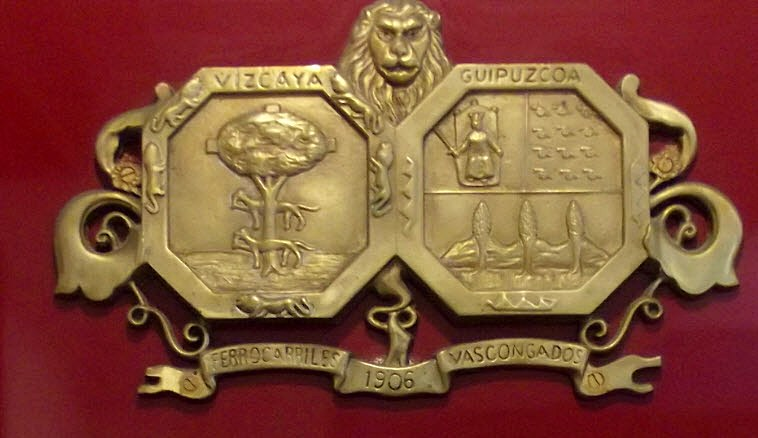
- Type: Publicly listed
- Founded: 1 July 1906
- Defunct: 29 December 1995
- Successor: FEVE (1972); Euskotren (1982)
- Headquarters: Atxuri station, Bilbao, Biscay, Spain
- Area served: Basque Country

Ferrocarriles Vascongados was a railway company in the Basque Country, Spain; founded in 1906 as the merger of three railway companies. It operated the Bilbao–San Sebastián line, as well as the Elorrio branch and the Deba railway. FEVE took over its operations in 1972, which in 1982 were transferred to the new company Basque Railways. Ferrocarriles Vascongados was dissolved in 1995, after more than two decades without activity.

== History ==
Ferrocarriles Vascongados was founded in 1906 with the merger of three different companies:

- Compañía del Ferrocarril Central de Vizcaya (Spanish for 'Biscay Central Railway Company'). It operated the Bilbao-Durango line, opened in 1882; as well as the Durango-Elorrio branchline, opened in 1905.
- Compañía del Ferrocarril de Durango a Zumárraga (Spanish for 'Durango-Zumárraga Railway Company'). Its line, running from Durango to Zumarraga, opened in phases between 1887 and 1889. It also owned the San Pedro de Carquízano (Elgoibar) branch.
- Compañía del Ferrocarril de Elgoibar a San Sebastián (Spanish for 'Elgoibar-San Sebastián Railway Company'). Opened in phases between 1893 and 1901, it ran from Elgoibar to San Sebastián.

Although the three companies were independent, they had numerous shareholders in common and overlapping interests. After long negotiations, the three companies merged on 1 July 1906. The merger of the companies was followed by a strong growth in both passenger and freight traffic. In 1929 its lines were electrified, with the exception of the Elorrio branch which was electrified in 1946. Together with the electrification, the company acquired its first non-inherited rolling stock, composed of electric Brown Boveri and ASEA locomotives and Ganz railcars. During the 1920s the company tried to acquire the Amorebieta-Pedernales railway, but ultimately failed due to its long-running liquidity problems. An extension of the Elorrio branch to Mondragón was studied in 1946, but wasn't carried out due to lack of funding. The company reached its peak in the aftermath of the Spanish Civil War, but the improvements in road transport since the 1950s marked the start of its decline.

Together with the declining traffic levels, the infrastructure and rolling stock became more obsolete. By the early 1970s the company was in a very difficult position, and on 25 June 1972, the government-owned company FEVE took over its operations. The Elorrio branch and the Deba railway were closed in 1975, and in 1979 the operations were transferred to the Basque General Council. In 1982, the former Ferrocarriles Vascongados network became the backbone of the new Basque Railways (now Euskotren), owned by the Basque Government.

Despite ceasing operations in 1972, the company wasn't immediately disbanded. In 1976, an agreement was reached with the government regarding the transfer of its assets. This allowed the company to pay back its debts, and on 29 December 1995 its shareholders dissolved the company.

== Rolling stock ==
After the merger, the new company inherited the steam locomotives and the coaches owned by its predecessors. Ferrocarriles Vascongados and its predecessors operated a total of 71 steam locomotives, built by Couillet, Nasmyth & Wilson, Porter, Hanomag and Krauss. Due to the electrification of the Bilbao–San Sebastián line in 1929, electric rolling stock was acquired. Fourteen new locomotives were built by Brown Boveri and ASEA, and fourteen railcars by Ganz. In the 1950s, three more ASEA locomotives were bought, as well as four second-hand railcars. The last rolling stock acquired consisted of four railcars built by Ferrocarriles Vascongados itself in the 1960s. Most of these train types were inherited by FEVE and later by Euskotren.

=== Steam locomotives ===
Class	Image	Operator	In service	Number	Notes
1–5 (Hanomag)		Biscay Central	1882–1904	5	The first locomotives for the Bilbao-Durango railway. Due to their low power output, they were sold to other operators before the foundation of Ferrocarriles Vascongados.
6–7 (Hanomag)		Biscay Central	1884–1914	2	Bought to supplement the original five Hanomag locomotives.
21–26 (Couillet)		Durango-Zumárraga	1882–1904	7	The first locomotives for the Durango-Zumárraga railway. One of them was sold to the Bilbao-Las Arenas railway shortly after delivery. The remaining locomotives were sold to other operators shortly after the foundation of Ferrocarriles Vascongados.
27–28 (Couillet)		Durango-Zumárraga	1889–1915	2	Two Mallet locomotives with a higher power output than the older Couillet locomotives.
130T		Biscay Central; Elgoibar-San Sebastián	1892–1964	10	A series of ten 2-6-0 locomotives (130 under the French system used in Spain) built by Nasmyth & Wilson, bought jointly by the Biscay Central and Elgoibar-San Sebastián railways, with six and four locomotives respectively.
220T		Biscay Central; Elgoibar-San Sebastián	1900–1955	7	A series of seven 4-4-0 locomotives (220 under the French system used in Spain) built by Nasmyth & Wilson, bought jointly by the Biscay Central and Elgoibar-San Sebastián railways, with four and three locomotives respectively.
Porter		Biscay Central; Durango-Zumárraga; Elgoibar-San Sebastián	1901–1955	8	A series of eight locomotives built by Porter, bought jointly by the three pre-merger companies: Biscay Central four, Elgoibar-San Sebastián two, and Durango-Zumárraga two.
020T "Elgoibar"		Durango-Zumárraga	1886–1891	1	A single 0-4-0 locomotive built by Krauss. Due to its low specifications, it was sold to the Elgoibar-San Sebastián railway, where it was used during the construction of the line. It was later sold to a mine railway in Cantabria.
131T		Durango-Zumárraga; Elgoibar-San Sebastián	1902–1974	4	Four 2-6-2 locomotives (131 under the French system used in Spain) built by Krauss, bought jointly by the Durango-Zumárraga and Elgoibar-San Sebastián railways (two each).
040T		Durango-Zumárraga	1903–1974	6	Originally a series of three 0-8-0 locomotives (040 under the French system used in Spain) built by Krauss, bought by the Durango-Zumárraga railway as a substitute for the Couillet locomotives. Three additional locomotives were acquired after the merger.
Easo class		Elgoibar-San Sebastián	1904–1941	5	Five Engerth locomotives (two of them delivered after the merger), built by Krauss.
Euzkadi class		Ferrocarriles Vascongados	1914–1958	14	Fourteen Engerth locomotives bought after the merger, built by Krauss. Most were sold to other operators after the electrification.

=== Electric and gasoline-electric rolling stock ===
Class	Image	Type	In service	Number	Notes
1–10 (Brown Boveri)		Electric locomotive	1928–1999	10	A series of ten electric locomotives, built at the time of the electrification. Later operated by FEVE and Euskotren.
11–14 (ASEA)		Electric locomotive	1931–2016	4	Four electric locomotives intended to supplement the Brown Boveri locomotives.
15–17 (ASEA)		Electric locomotive	1950–2010	3	Three electric locomotives built in 1950. Mechanically similar to the older ASEA locomotives, they featured a more modern exterior design.
MACD 1–5 (Ganz)		Railcar	1928–1980	5	Mechanically identical to their longer MCD 1–9 counterparts, they were built specifically for the Deba railway, which featured very tight curves. After 1951, they were relegated to auxiliary services.
MACD 10–13 (Alsthom)		Railcar	1949–1974	4	A total of seven railcars were built in 1930 by Alsthom for the Toulouse-Castres railway, which closed in 1939. Four of them were acquired by Ferrocarriles Vascongados, and the remaining three by Ferrocarriles y Transportes Suburbanos.
MCD 1–9 (Ganz)		Railcar	1928–1981	9	A series of nine railcars built by Hungarian manufacturer Ganz. In regular service until the mid-1970s, although one train was in use in the San Sebastián-Hendaye line until 1981.
MCD 14–17		Railcar	1962–1997	4	Built by Ferrocarriles Vascongados itself in the 1960s. After Ferrocarriles Vascongados was absorbed by FEVE, they were renumbered as the 3150 series.
TACM 1-2		Railcar	1913–1917	2	Two gasoline-electric railcars built in 1912 by De Dion-Bouton. Built for services between San Sebastián and Zarautz, they were in service from 12 May 1913 to 30 May 1917.
