= 3150 =

3150 may refer to:

- A.D. 3150, a year in the 4th millennium CE
- 3150 BC, a year in the 4th millennium BCE
- 3150, a number in the 3000 (number) range

== Roads numbered 3150 ==
- Hawaii Route 3150, a state highway
- Texas Farm to Market Road 3150, a state highway
- Malaysia Federal Route 3150, a highway in Ipoh

== Rail ==
- CP Class 3150, an electric multiple unit train class
- Euskotren 3150 series, a railcar class
- GWR 3150 Class, a side tank steam locomotive class
- Meitetsu 3150 series, an electric multiple unit train class

== Other uses ==
- 3150 Tosa, an asteroid in the Asteroid Belt, the 3150th asteroid registered
- CDC 3150, a CDC 3000 series minicomputer
