= Brown Boveri electric locomotive (Ferrocarriles Vascongados) =

Electric locomotive in Spain

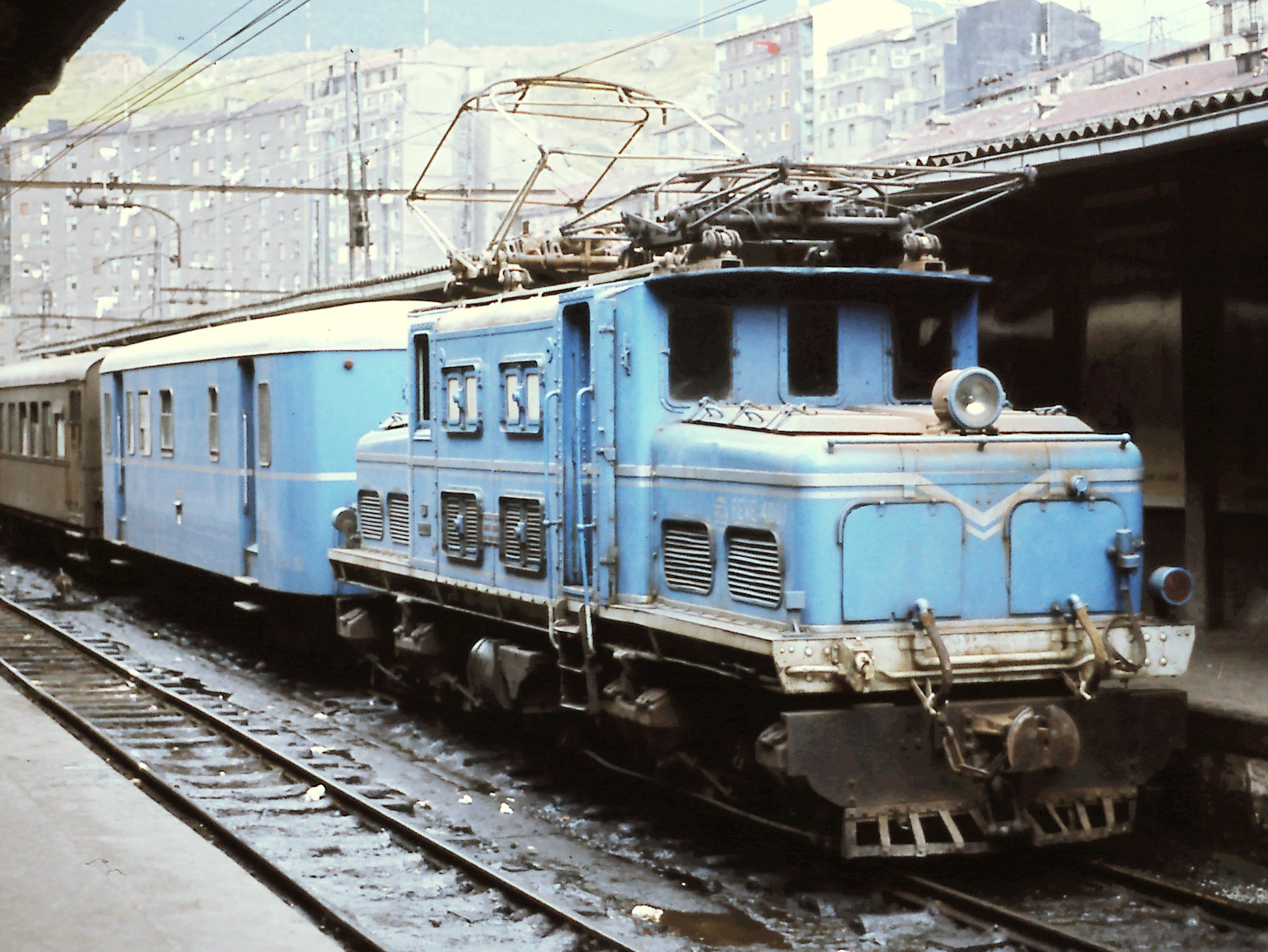
- A FEVE 4000 series locomotive hauling a train, September 1977.
Type and origin
- Power type: Electric
- Builder: Brown Boveri, Haine-Saint-Pierre
- Build date: 1928
- Total produced: 10
Specifications
- Configuration
  - AAR: B-B
  - UIC: Bo′+Bo′
- Gauge: 1,000 mm (3 ft 3 3/8 in)
- Length: 11.22 m (36 ft 10 in)
- Width: 2.53 m (8 ft 4 in)
- Height: 3.25 m (10 ft 8 in)
- Axle load: 11,000 kg (24,251 lb)
- Loco weight: 44,000 kg (97,003 lb)
- Electric system/s: 1,500 V DC overhead line
- Current pickup: Pantograph
- Loco brake: Vacuum
Performance figures
- Maximum speed: 70 km/h (45 mph)
- Power output
  - 1 hour: 760 kW (1,019 hp)
  - Continuous: 564 kW (756 hp)
- Tractive effort
  - Starting: 108 kN (24,000 lb_{f})
  - 1 hour: 56 kN (13,000 lb_{f})
  - Continuous: 37 kN (8,300 lb_{f})
Career
- Operators: Ferrocarriles Vascongados, FEVE, Euskotren
- Delivered: 1928
- Retired: 1999

The Brown Boveri electric locomotive was an electric locomotive type originally operated by Ferrocarriles Vascongados in the Basque Country, Spain. When that company was absorbed by FEVE, it came to be known as the FEVE 4000 series. It was later operated by Euskotren.

== History ==
Due to an increase in traffic, Ferrocarriles Vascongados decided in the 1920s to electrify its main line between Bilbao and San Sebastián. Correspondingly, the company ordered nine (later 10) electric locomotives in May 1927 for hauling freight trains and heavy passenger trains. They were numbered 1 to 10. The electrical components were manufactured by the Swiss company Brown, Boveri & Cie, while the mechanical parts were built by Forges Usines et Fonderies Haine-Saint-Pierre, a Belgian company. Like other locomotives, they were nicknamed Cocodrilo (Spanish for 'crocodile') due to their distinctive shape. While originally painted in red and cream colors, the locomotives were repainted in a less distinctive grey and green color scheme during the Spanish Civil War.

After the original operator was absorbed into FEVE in 1972, the locomotives were renumbered as 4001 to 4010. This period saw a decline in freight traffic which coupled with the retirement of some multiple unit types meant the 4000 series was increasingly used to haul local train services. It was during this time that the locomotives had their axleboxes changed, the most significant overhaul during their lifetime. After the establishment of Euskotren in 1982 (known at the time as ET/FV), they were transferred to the new company. They were gradually retired from service starting in 1988, with some locomotives being used to haul tourist trains up to 1999.

== Technology ==
The locomotive has a undercarriage that consists of two two-axle carriages with a cross-bearing drive, which are connected to each other with a close coupling. The axle bearings are designed as Isothermos bearings.

The superstructures do not transmit tractive force and serve only to protect the electrical equipment. They consist of a central part in the form of a shorter locomotive body with the two cabs and the two scissor pantographs and two front bodies. The superstructures, on which the third headlight is also placed, use the whole width of the vehicle.

In the central part, between the two cabs, is the apparatus room with a central aisle. On one side are the high-voltage cell, the cam controller, the vacuum pump for the train brake, and the compressor for the pantographs and whistle. On the other are the low-voltage frame, the quick-action switch, the converter for the control power supply, the batteries, and the traction motor fan. The cam gear is mechanically driven by the handwheels of the master controllers in the cabs via a chain transmission. A hand air pump allows the pantograph to be lifted without compressed air.

The starting resistors are located in the front ends. The two CMTD-type traction motors of a bogie form a group permanently connected in series. When starting up, both groups are connected in series on the first nine speed steps, and on the next five speed steps they are connected in parallel, followed by two field weakening stages. The locomotives have no electric brake. The traction motors were cooled by the fan with two fan wheels located in the engine room, which sucked in the cooling air in the lower area of the side wall and directed it through floor ducts to the traction motors in the undercarriage.

== Numbering and naming ==
The locomotives were named after mountains of the Basque Country. Their individual details are as follows.

FV No.	FEVE No.	Name	BBC No.	HSP No.	Retired	Fate
1	4001	Ganguren	2832	1572	1986	Scrapped around 1989 after derailing in Ermua in 1986.
2	4002	Ulía	2833	1573	1999	Refurbished in 1991, used until 1999 for hauling tourist trains. Preserved by the Basque Railway Museum.
3	4003	Bizkargi	2834	1574	1989	Cannibalized, later preserved by the Basque Railway Museum.
4	4004	Kalamua	2835	1575		Donated in 1993 to La Traction, a Swiss heritage railway. Scrapped around 2015.
5	4005	Mugarra	2836	1576		Scrapped in 1989 after being destroyed by fire.
6	4006	Arate	2839	1577	1999	Refurbished in 1990, used until 1999 for hauling tourist trains. Preserved by the Basque Railway Museum.
7	4007	Aluitz	2840	1578		Scrapped in 1989 after being destroyed by fire.
8	4008	Galdaramiño	2838	1579	1989	Originally preserved by the Basque Railway Museum. It was exchanged with a collector in 1994.
9	4009	Andux	2837	1580		Exchanged with FGV. Currently preserved by the Basque Railway Museum.
10	4010	Irukurutzeta	2964	1586	1999	Refurbished in 1991, used until 1999 for hauling tourist trains; when it was exchanged with the Ferrocarril de Sóller. It was scrapped in 2012.

== See also ==
- Ferrocarriles Vascongados § Rolling stock
