= Euskotren TD2000 series =

Electro-diesel locomotive operated by Euskotren

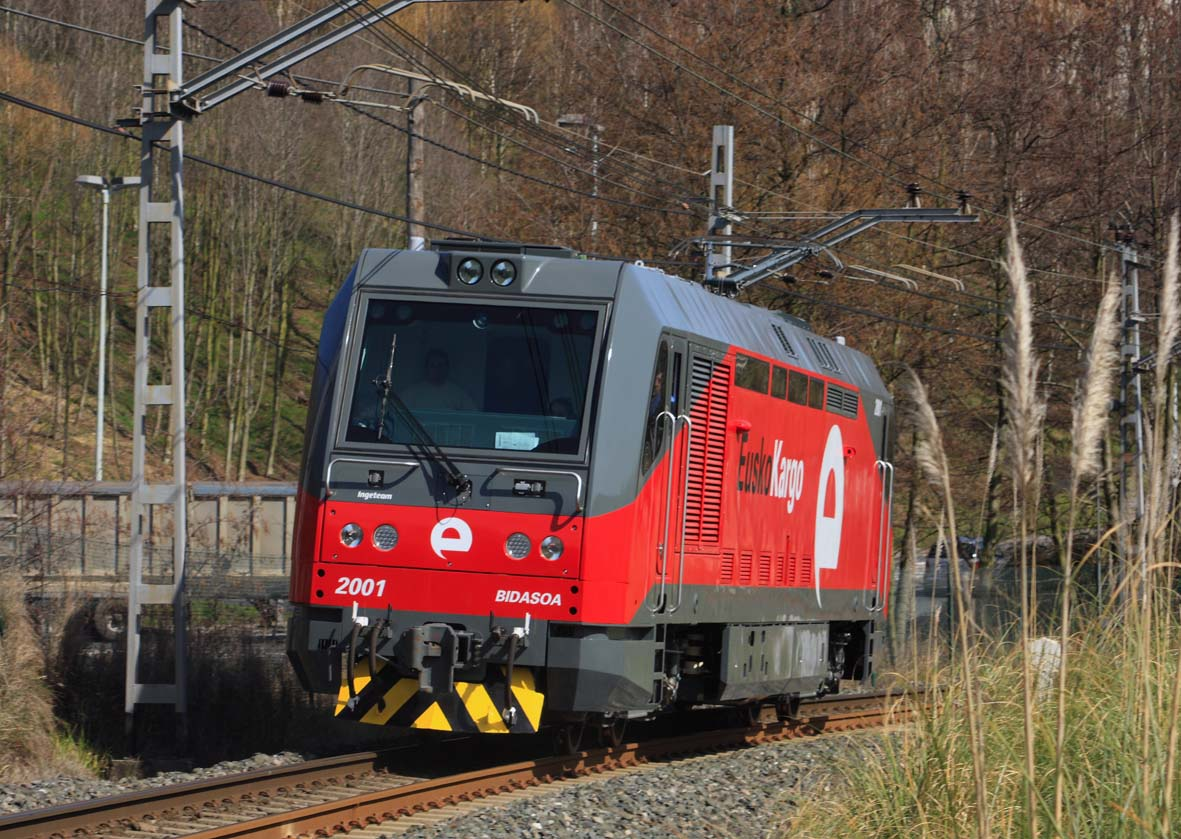
- A TD2000 during testing, March 2009
Type and origin
- Power type: Dual-mode
- Builder: Ingeteam, CFD
- Build date: 2008–2011
- Total produced: 12
Specifications
- Configuration
  - AAR: B-B
  - UIC: B′B′
- Gauge: 1,000 mm (3 ft 3 3/8 in), 1,067 mm (3 ft 6 in)
- Wheel diameter: 920 mm (3 ft 0 in)
- Minimum curve: 70 m (229 ft 8 in)
- Length: 17 m (55 ft 9 in)
- Width: 2.6 m (8 ft 6 in)
- Height: 3.78 m (12 ft 5 in)
- Axle load: 15.5 t
- Loco weight: 62 t (61 long tons; 68 short tons)
- Electric system/s: 1,500 V DC overhead line
- Current pickup(s): Pantograph
- Prime mover: Caterpillar 3512B
- Engine type: Four-stroke diesel engine
- Aspiration: Turbocharger
- Transmission: Electric
- Loco brake: Dynamic brake
- Train brakes: Air brakes
- Safety systems: SISTEAM OCS, ASFA, Euroloop
Performance figures
- Maximum speed: 80 km/h (50 mph)
- Power output
  - Continuous: 1,200 kW (1,609 hp)
- Tractive effort
  - Starting: 260 kN (58,000 lb_{f})
Career
- Operators: Euskotren, FGC (formerly), Ferrocarriles de Ecuador
- Numbers: 2001–2012
- Disposition: All in service (Euskotren)

The Euskotren TD2000 series is an electro-diesel locomotive type operated by Euskotren in the Basque Country, Spain.

== History ==
In 2006, Euskotren awarded Ingeteam the construction of 12 diesel-electric locomotives for 37.5 million euros. The first locomotives were delivered in early 2009, and entered service later that year. The purchase has been criticized due to the low usage of the locomotives, caused by an overestimation of rail freight demand.

Due to lack of use, one of the locomotives was leased to FGC from 2012 to 2017, where it served as the FGC 255 series. In 2015, three of the locomotives were converted to 1,067 mm (3 ft 6 in) gauge and sold to FE EP, the national railway of Ecuador.

== Naming ==
Each unit is named after a river of the Basque Country.

== See also ==
- Euskotren rolling stock
