= Azpeitia =

Town in Spain

- Municipality
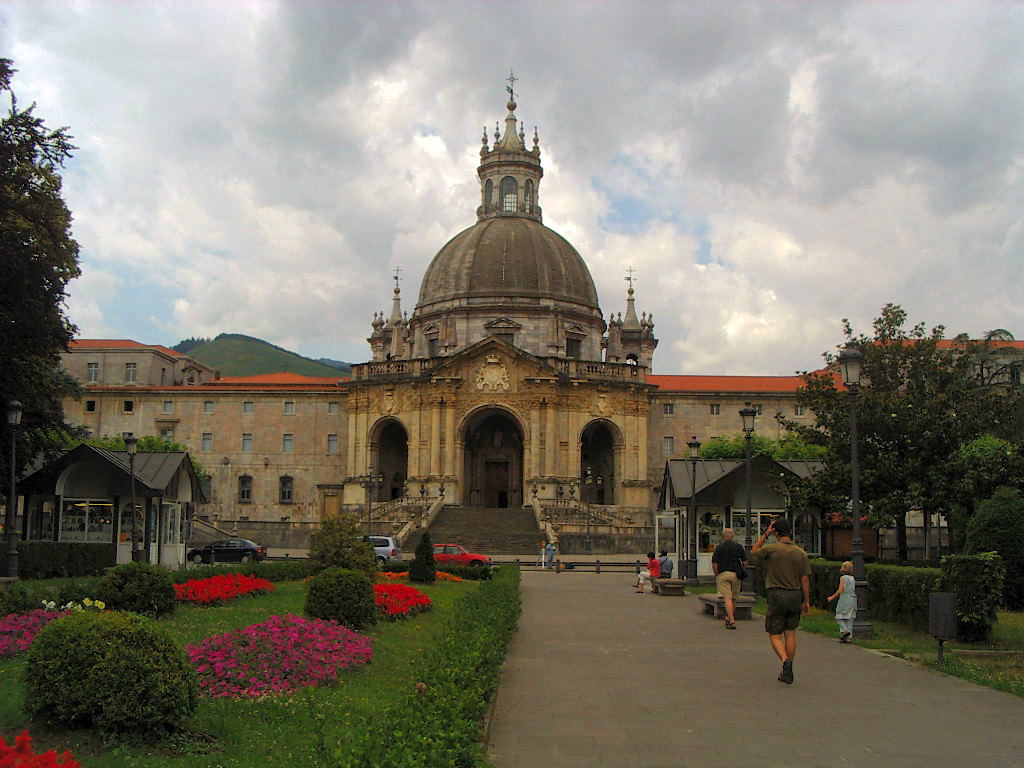
- Sanctuary of Ignatius of Loyola

- Flag Coat of arms

- Location of Azpeitia within the Basque Autonomous Community
- Coordinates: 43°10′55″N 2°15′55″W
- Country: Spain
- Autonomous community: Basque Country
- Province: Gipuzkoa
- Comarca: Urola Kosta
- Founded: 1310

Government
  - Mayor: Nagore Alkorta (Bildu)

Area
  - Total: 210.12 km^{2} (81.13 sq mi)
- Elevation: 80 m (260 ft)

Population (2025-01-01)
  - Total: 15,301
  - Density: 72.820/km^{2} (188.60/sq mi)
- Demonym: Basque: azpeitiarra
- Time zone: UTC+1 (CET)
  - Summer (DST): UTC+2 (CEST)
- Postal code: 20730
- Website: Official website

Azpeitia is a town and municipality within the province of Gipuzkoa, in the Basque Country, Spain, located on the Urola river a few kilometres east of Azkoitia. Its population is 14,580 (as of 2014). It is located 41 kilometres (25 mi) southwest of San Sebastián.

Azpeitia is the birthplace of Ignatius of Loyola. The house of his birth is now preserved as a part of large Jesuit compound, the Sanctuary of Loyola, a major attraction of tourists and pilgrims alike. It is also the birthplace of Renaissance composer Juan de Anchieta.

Azpeitia lies at the foot of the massive Izarraitz towering over the town and much visited by the townspeople. The Basque Railway Museum is located in the town.

== Etymology ==
The name Azpeitia means 'down the rock' in Basque.

== Historical background ==
Azpeitia was incorporated in 1310 by a royal decree of King Fernando IV. Its original name was “Garmendia de Iraurgi” and a year later it was renamed “Salvatierra de Iraurgi”. The name “Azpeitia” is first found in 1397. During the 13th and 14th centuries there were many battles and wars among prominent families in the town, especially between the Oñatz and Gamboa families. In 1766, there was revolt in the town against King Carlos V's policy of liberalizing the selling and buying of wheat and a rebellious town council was briefly established. However, the revolt was quickly suppressed by troops sent from San Sebastián.

The steel and wood industries have historically been the main industries in Azpeitia. The Sanctuary of Loyola is its major local tourist attraction, together with the Basque Railway Museum.

== St Ignatius of Loyola (Founder of the Society of Jesus) ==
He was born in Loyola, Azpeitia, in 1491 and died in Rome in 1556. His family was part of the aristocracy of Biscay. As a young man he worked in the service of the viceroy of Navarre. He was injured in both legs during the defence of Pamplona in 1521. Afterwards, during his convalescence, he started reading religious books. This had a big impact on his life. He then travelled to Catalonia, first to the monastery of Montserrat in 1522 and then to Manresa, where he retired to a cave to meditate for a year. Afterwards he wrote his most famous book, the Book of Spiritual Exercises (Libro de los Ejercicios Espirituales).

After various journeys to Rome, Barcelona, Alcalá de Henares and Salamanca, he went to Paris in 1528, where he studied philosophy and theology. Together with some other students he founded the core of the Society of Jesus, which received Papal approval in 1540 and chose St Ignatius as its superior general. Afterwards, the Jesuits spread all over the world, starting in Europe and then to the Americas. When he died, St Ignatius was canonised by the Roman Catholic Church.

== Basque Railway Museum (Museo Vasco del Ferrocarril) ==
The museum is situated in the old Urola railway station, on a line which connected Zumaia and Zumárraga. The Basque Railway Museum has one of the best railway collections in Europe, with vehicles of all types: steam locomotives, diesel and electric; automotive and different kinds of cars.

In addition, the museum offers one of the most complete sets of machine tools in the Basque Country from the old Urola Railway garage. This installation is preserved just as it was inaugurated in 1925, with an old electric motor that drives its 16 machines through a complex system of pulleys and belts. This line is no longer operated as a service. However, the train between Azpeitia and Lasao is an important tourist attraction.

The facilities of the old electrical transformer plant with its original equipment rectification, mercury vapor, reflect the technology of a century ago.

On the first floor of the central building of the old station at Azpeitia, there is an exceptional sample of the uniforms used in the railroads since the late nineteenth century to the AVE. On the second floor is a great collection of railway clocks. Nowadays, the train museum is operated by Eusko Tren, a public railway company run by the Basque government.

== Civil War In Azpeitia ==
A recent study supported by the Basque government, "Azpeitia 1936-1945" examines daily life in the period and an index of Azpeitians of the time with a summary of their political activities during and after the Civil War. It also contains reproductions of many of the historical documents of the time.

In Azpeitia, the main opposing sides were the Carlists (carlistas), who supported the Nationalists, and the Basque Nationalists from EAJ-PNV(supporting the Republicans). There were also falangists and left-wing militants (from UGT and Izquierda Republicana) and some anarchists. Nationalist troops entered Azpeitia in September, 1936. Shortly afterwards, a new council was created dominated by Carlists and traditionalists.

Azpeitia has long been known for the wide use of the Basque language, euskara, even though its use was diminished during Franco's regime. Franco himself visited Azpeitia (notably, the Loyola Sanctuary) in 1939 and in 1945.

== Emparan Tower House ==
Its building process started in 1320. It was the property of one of the most powerful Basque families of the time, the Oñatz family. In 1456, the upper part of the tower was destroyed by order of Henry IV. It was repaired in 1535. In 1750, numerous baroque elements typical of the time were added and the tower, now a palace, acquired its current appearance. Nowadays, the palace is Azpeitia's local public library.

== Hermitage of our Lady of Olatz ==
It is situated halfway between Azpeitia and Loyola. It was built in the late 13th and early 14th centuries. It contains a polychrome Gothic carving of Our Lady of Olatz, for whom it is said that San Ignatius felt a special devotion. The private boards of Gipuzkoa held their meetings here until the beginning of the 18th century.

== Hospital and Hermitage of la Madalena ==
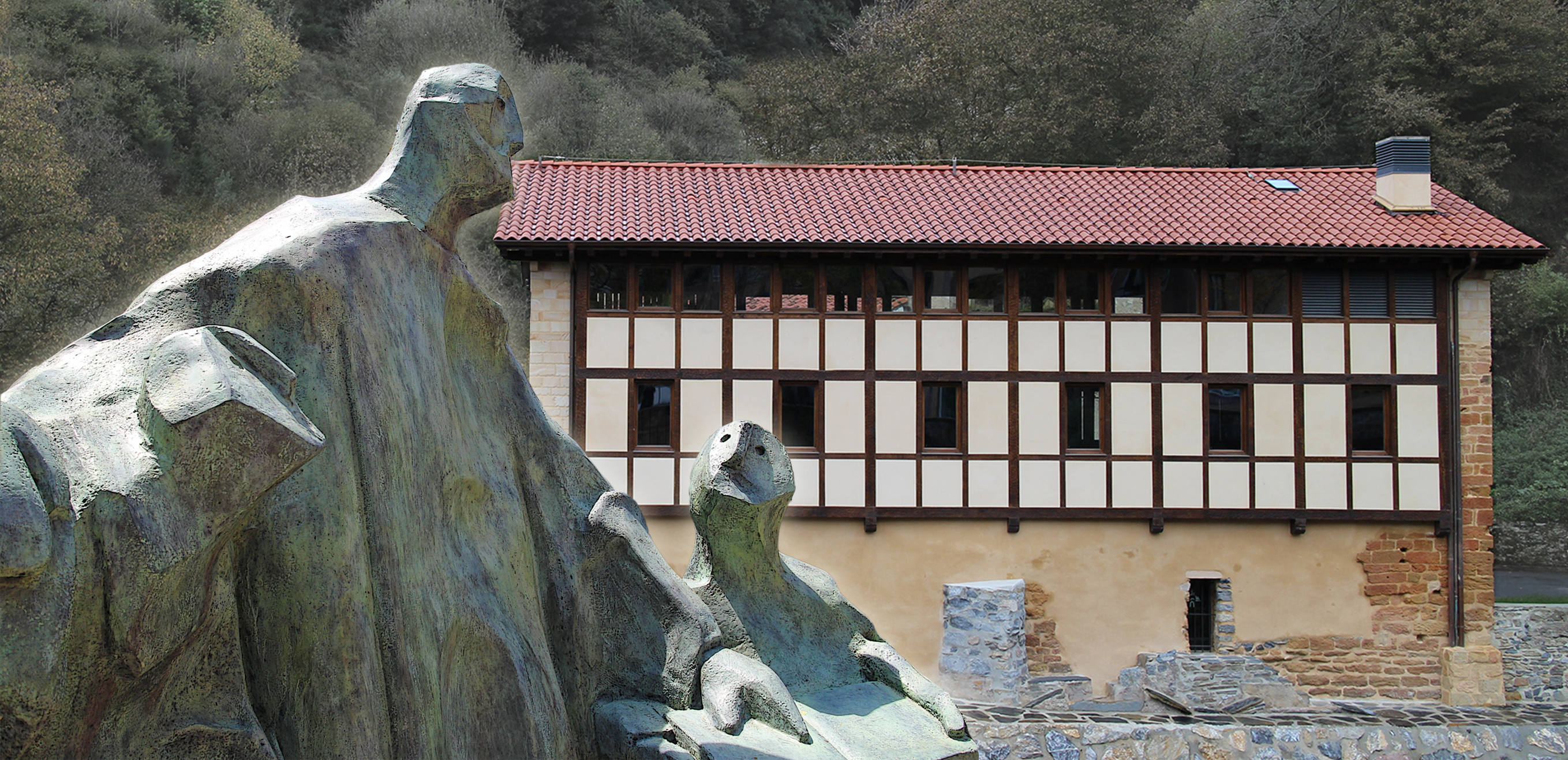
Hospital de la Magdalena

In 1535, after completing his studies in Paris, when Íñigo de Loyola (Saint Ignatius) arrived in Azpeitia, he was ill. However, instead of residing in the family tower house, he chose to stay in this hospital and leprosarium, together with the poorest patients. He used to preach there. He also is said to have walked the streets begging for food and help for those who were ill, homeless and unprotected. Nowadays, the old hospital is used as an Ignatian interpretation centre.

== Church of San Sebastián de Soreasu ==
Built by the Templars between the 16th and 18th centuries, it underwent extensive restructuring and only the tower of the old temple was conserved. The original portico was replaced in 1771 with a frontispiece designed by Francisco Ibero. The church has eight chapels in total. The Baroque altarpiece and the baptismal font where Íñigo de Loyola was Christianized are of outstanding beauty.

== Notable people ==
- St. Ignatius of Loyola (1491–1556), founder, and first Superior General, of the Society of Jesus, canonized Catholic Saint.
- Juan de Anchieta (1462 – 1523), Baroque composer
- Julián Elorza Aizpuru (1879-1964), a Spanish Carlist politician
- José de Arteche (1906–1971), a Basque writer and biographer, born in Azpeitia

=== Sport ===
- José Antonio Lopetegui (born 1930), stone lifter (harri-jasotze)
- Xabier Azkargorta (born 1953), footballer and manager
- Juan Antonio Larrañaga (born 1958), footballer
- Jon Guridi (born 1995), footballer
