= Bilbao-Atxuri station =

Spanish train station

Bilbao-Atxuri
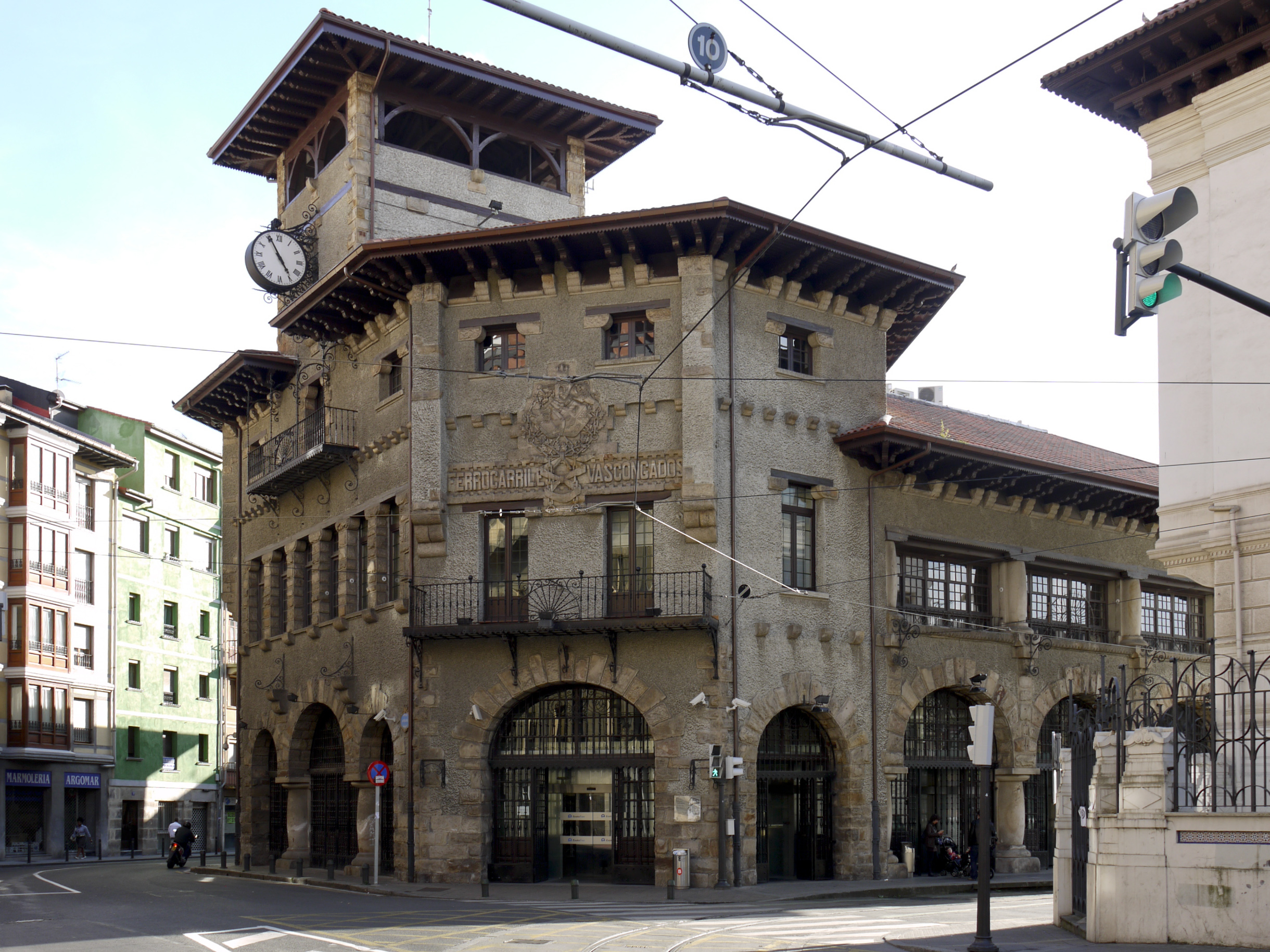
- Station's building

General information
- Location: 6, Atxuri St. 48006 Bilbao; Spain
- Coordinates: 43°15′13″N 2°55′18″W
- System: Commuter rail
- Owner: Euskal Trenbide Sarea (ETS)
- Line: Bilbao tram
- Platforms: 2 island platforms
- Tracks: 4
- Connections: Bus

Construction
- Structure type: At-grade station
- Platform levels: 1
- Parking: No
- Accessible: yes

Other information
- Fare zone: Zone 1

History
- Opened: 1912
Location

Bilbao-Atxuri is a former terminal railway station in Bilbao, Basque Country (Spain). It served as the terminus station for the commuter rail trains of Euskotren Trena lines to Durango, Bermeo, Eibar and San Sebastián for over one hundred years.

Currently, one side of the station serves as a stop of the Bilbao tram operated by Euskotren Tranbia. The station is located in the neighbourhood of Atxuri, part of the Ibaiondo district, in Bilbao. The main building of the former station serves as headquarters for Euskotren. It opened in 1912.

== History ==
The station of Bilbao-Atxuri, originally known simply as Achuri station, was designed by Basque-Irish architect Manuel María Smith. The station opened in 1912 and was built to replace a smaller former station that stood originally in the same place. The original station had been designed by Basque architect Sabino Goicoechea as the head of line of the Bilbao-Durango railway, operated by the Compañía del Ferrocarril Central de Vizcaya (Central Railway of Biscay Company). In 1906 the company was acquired by the Ferrocarriles Vascongados (Basque Country Railways), which meant the station would also become the start of the line for services running to Elgoibar, San Sebastián, Zumarraga and other cities and towns across Gipuzkoa. This expansion required a bigger station, which Ferrocarriles Vascongados commissioned and was opened in 1912. The new building would not only hold the terminus station of the railway services, but also the headquarters of the Ferrocarriles Vascongados, as well as a bell tower, something unusual at the time.

Under Ferrocarriles Vascongados, Achuri station served as the terminus station of services to Bermeo and San Sebastián, with connections towards Elorrio, Zumarraga and Vitoria-Gasteiz along the line. In 1977 the entire Ferrocarriles Vascongados network would become part of FEVE, the state-owned company for narrow-gauge railways, which was soon thereafter transferred to the Basque Government to form Euskotren in 1982. The station was then renamed Bilbao-Atxuri, following the modern conventions of Basque orthography. In 1983 the station suffered extensive damage on its lower floor due to a flooding of the Bilbao estuary, which also destroyed the train depots.

The station remained unchanged until the year 2002, when due to the opening of the Bilbao tram new depots fit for tramways were constructed, as well as a tram stop in one of the sides. After the opening of the Line 3 of the Bilbao Metro in 2017, it was announced that all services operated by Euskotren Trena would be diverted towards the more central station of Zazpikaleak/Casco Viejo, putting an end to the railway activity of the station. The transfer of railway line was progressive until September 2019, when the last line was transferred. Since then the station holds no railway activity and serves only as the headquarters of the Basque Railways.

Nevertheless, one side of the station is used as the southern terminus of Bilbao's Tramway. In the future, works are expected to take place inside the station's building, as the tramway line is expected to be extended all the way to Kukullaga. The renewal works are expected to begin in late 2019.

== Station layout ==
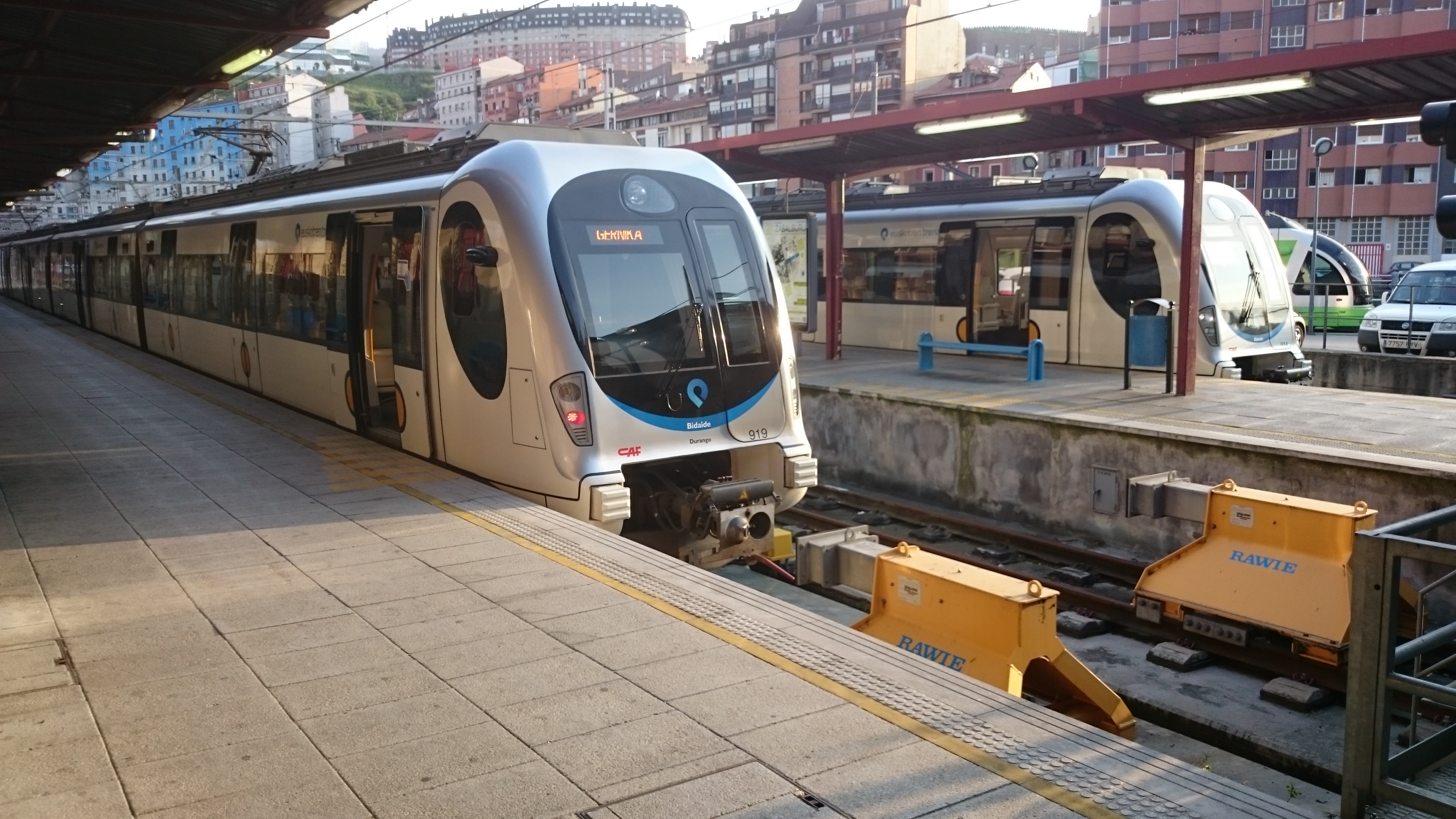
Platforms.

The station is an at-grade station with a large entrance facing Atxuri street. The main hall of the station is spacious and includes ticketing machines a waiting area as well as a small store. During the times as part of Ferrocarriles Vascongados it also included a restaurant. The station also serves the southern terminus for the Bilbao tram, including an at-grade platform and single track on one side of the building. The main hall also includes access to the headquarters of the Basque Railways (located on the upper floors) and to the main train platforms. Since the closure of the station in September 2019, the main building is not accessible by the public.

=== Access ===
- 6 Atxuri St.

== Services ==
=== Former rail services ===
When the station first opened in 1912 it served as the terminus for the Bilbao-Durango railway, and new services to other Basque cities were included after the merging of several railway companies to create the Ferrocarriles Vascongados. After the creation of Euskotren, Bilbao-Atxuri served as the terminus station for all commuter and regional rail services offered by EuskoTren, including the former lines 1, 1D and 3, connecting to the cities of San Sebastián, Guernica, Eibar and others. After the opening of the Bilbao Metro's Line 3, operated by Euskotren Trena, the trains coming from all destinations except from the Urdaibai line were rerouted through the new underground route that connects directly with Zazpikaleak/Casco Viejo station in central Bilbao from Kukullaga, bypassing Bolueta and Atxuri stations completely.

=== Tram services ===
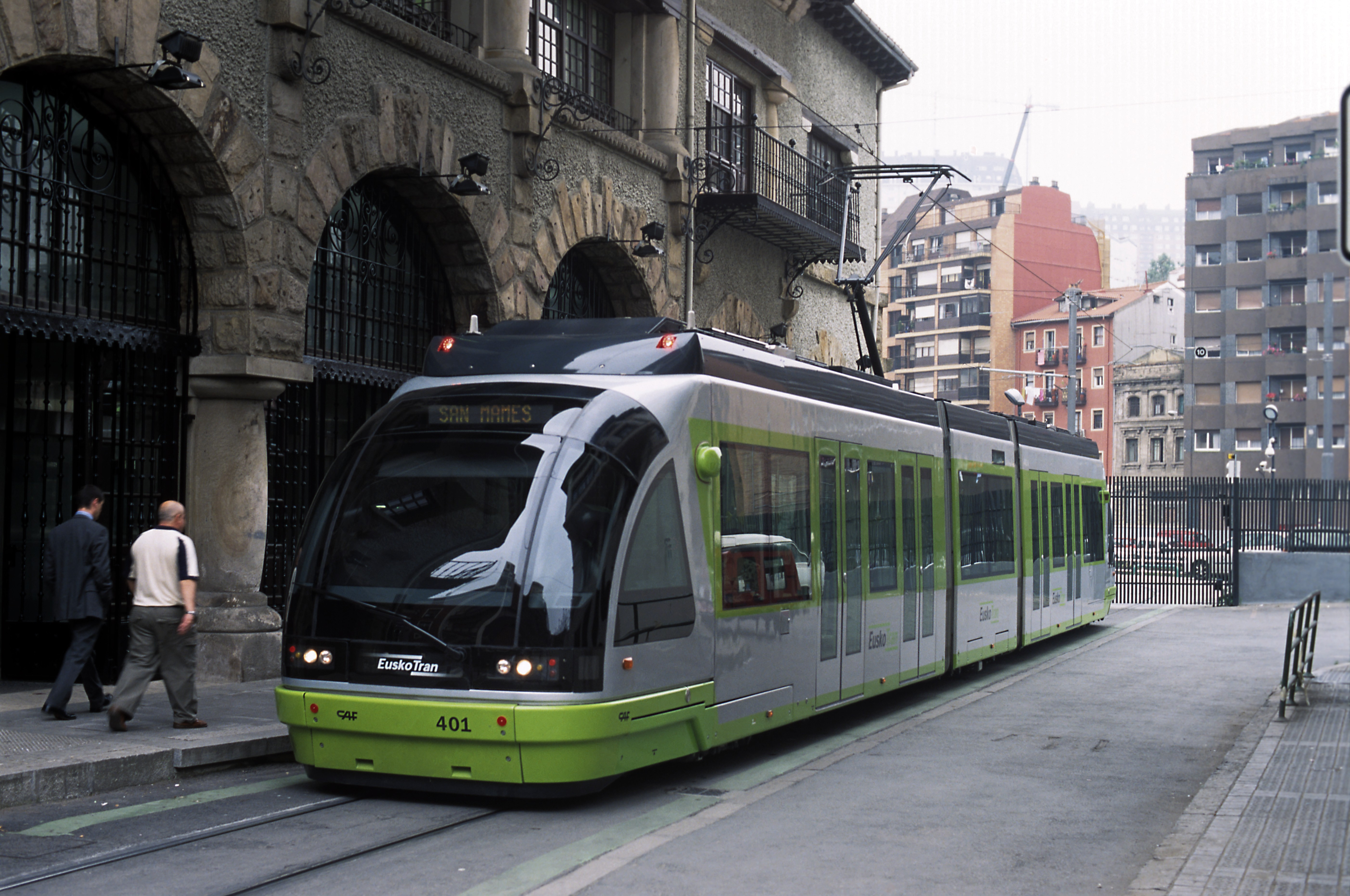
Tram stop.

Bilbao-Atxuri is a stop of the Bilbao tram, a light rail tram connecting the district of Ibaiondo, mainly the old town, with Abando, the Guggenheim museum and the San Mamés area. The tramway line was opened in December, 2002.

	Bilbao tram	
Ribera toward La Casilla	Bilbao's Tram	Abusu toward Bolueta

=== Bus ===
The station is served by the following local Bilbobus services. A 'G' in the line name denotes a Gautxori night line service.

- 40 Santutxu - Biribila Plaza
- 77 Peñascal - Mina del Morro
- G7 Mina del Morro - Biribila Plaza

The station is also served by the following regional Bizkaibus services, running to other municipalities within the Bilbao metropolitan area or elsewhere in Biscay.

- A3613 Bilbao - Ugao-Miraballes - Orozko
- A3622 Bilbao - Basauri - Zaratamo
- A3918 Bilbao - Orozko

=== Future ===
After the opening of the Zazpikaleak/Casco Viejo station for Euskotren Trena, most commuter trains coming from inner Biscay and Gipuzkoa were diverted toward the newer, more centric station, in consequence leaving Bilbao-Atxuri station with little commuter rail traffic. While the original operational plan for Euskotren Trena involved the diversion of all E4 trains coming from Guernica and Bermeo to the new station in early 2018, the changes were delayed at least until 2019 to avoid leaving the commuter rail section of the station without any services, which in turn would also affect Bolueta station. The Basque Government and the administration of the rail network, Euskal Trenbide Sarea (ETS), announced in 2003 the intention of transforming the rail road section between Bilbao-Atxuri, Bolueta and Etxebarri into a tramway line, thus continuing the existing Bilbao tramway service which currently has its terminus at Bilbao-Atxuri, however not many actions have been taken towards this objective. In early 2017 the plan was brought back by the administration and some studies were conducted The renewal works were commissioned in November 2019.
