= Basque Railway Museum =

Railway museum in Azpeitia, Spain

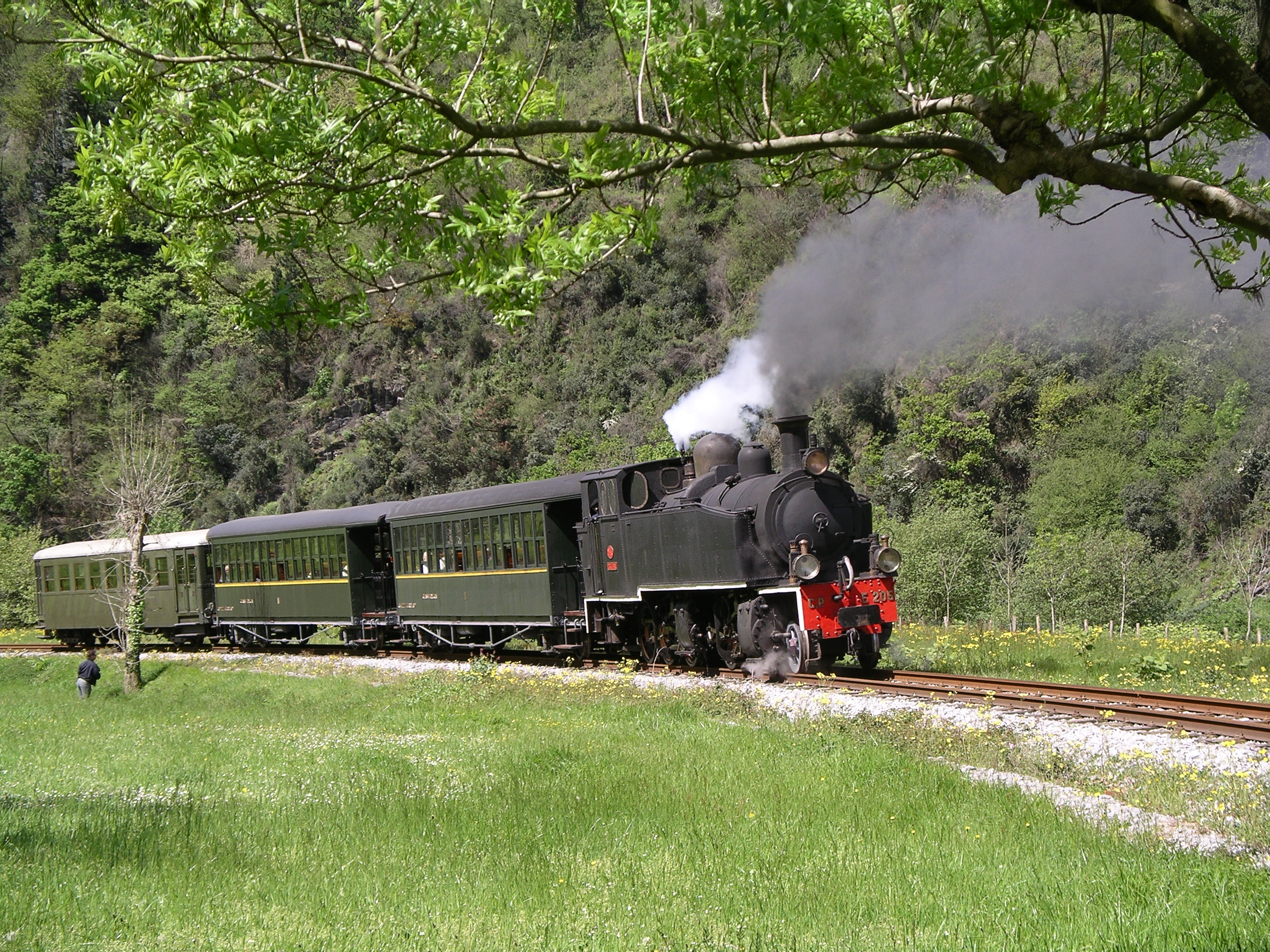
- The steam locomotive "Portugal" hauling a train.
- Established: 1992
- Location: Azpeitia, Basque Country, Spain
- Coordinates: 43.1858°N 2.2614°W
- Type: Railway museum; Heritage railway
- Director: Juanjo Olaizola
- Owner: Euskotren
- Website: https://museoa.euskotren.eus/en

The Basque Railway Museum (Basque: Burdinbidearen Euskal Museoa, Spanish: Museo Vasco del Ferrocarril) is located in Azpeitia, Basque Country, Spain. It has a collection of steam locomotives and other rolling stock as well as other items, most of them related to the Basque narrow gauge railway network. The museum is located in the former railway station in Azpeitia.

The museum operates a heritage railway between Azpeitia and Lasao, on the former Urola railway line. The 4.5 km (2.8 mi) line is isolated from the Euskotren network.
