= Euskotren =

Public railway company

Eusko Trenbideak - Ferrocarriles Vascos S.A.
- Company type: Government-owned
- Industry: Rail transport; Bus transport
- Founded: 24 May 1982
- Headquarters: 8 Atxuri Street, Bilbao, Biscay, Spain
- Area served: Basque Country
- Key people: Antonio Aiz (President)
- Owner: Basque Government
- Number of employees: 1,163 (2019)
- Divisions: Euskotren Trena; Euskotren Tranbia; Euskotren Autobusa; Euskotren Kargo
- Website: www.euskotren.eus/en

Euskotren, formally known as Basque Railways (Basque: Eusko Trenbideak, Spanish: Ferrocarriles Vascos), is a public railway company controlled by the Basque Government and officially established in 1982 to operate several 1,000 mm (3 ft 3 3/8 in) narrow gauge railways inside the autonomous community of the Basque Country, under the terms of the Statute of Autonomy of the Basque Country. Originally operating under the commercial brand ET/FV, it took control of the management and operations of the narrow gauge lines formerly operated by the railway company FEVE. The commercial brand eventually changed to Euskotren, as it remains today. Since 2006, the infrastructure on which the company runs its trains has been owned by Euskal Trenbide Sarea.

== Divisions ==
Euskotren operates several public transportation services; including commuter rail, inter-city rail, urban rail transit and public bus services as well as freight rail transport. Each of the transport services is operated under a global commercial brand. The company also aims to operate high-speed rail services on the Basque Y.

Aside from its four main divisions, the company also manages the Basque Railway Museum in Azpeitia and the Larreineta funicular in Valle de Trápaga-Trapagaran.

=== Euskotren Trena ===
Euskotren Trena is the commercial brand for the railway services operated by Euskotren (including Bilbao Metro Line 3). Until 2012 the commercial brand for the service was EuskoTren.

=== Euskotren Tranbia ===
Euskotren Tranbia (tranbia being the Basque word for tram) is the commercial brand for the urban tram services operated by Euskotren. From the opening of the first line in Bilbao in 2002 until 2012 the commercial brand for these services was EuskoTran.

=== Euskotren Autobusa ===
Euskotren Autobusa (autobusa being the Basque word for bus) is the commercial brand for the operator of several bus lines in the provinces of Biscay and Gipuzkoa. Euskotren Autobusa serves as an operator for the services among other companies; the commercial brand for the services is Bizkaibus in Biscay and Lurraldebus in Gipuzkoa.

=== Euskotren Kargo ===
Euskotren Kargo is the commercial brand for the freight rail transport services operated by Euskotren. Euskotren Kargo operated only during nighttime, sharing the railtracks of Euskotren Trena. Until 2012 the commercial brand for the service was EuskoKargo.

== Rolling stock ==
As of 2021, the Euskotren Trena service is operated with a fleet of 58 electric multiple units (EMU), all built by CAF. The Euskotren Tranbia tramway services in Bilbao and Vitoria-Gasteiz are operated using a fleet of 26 CAF Urbos trams, distributed between both networks. Additionally, Euskotren owns several TD2000 series locomotives, intended for freight transport.

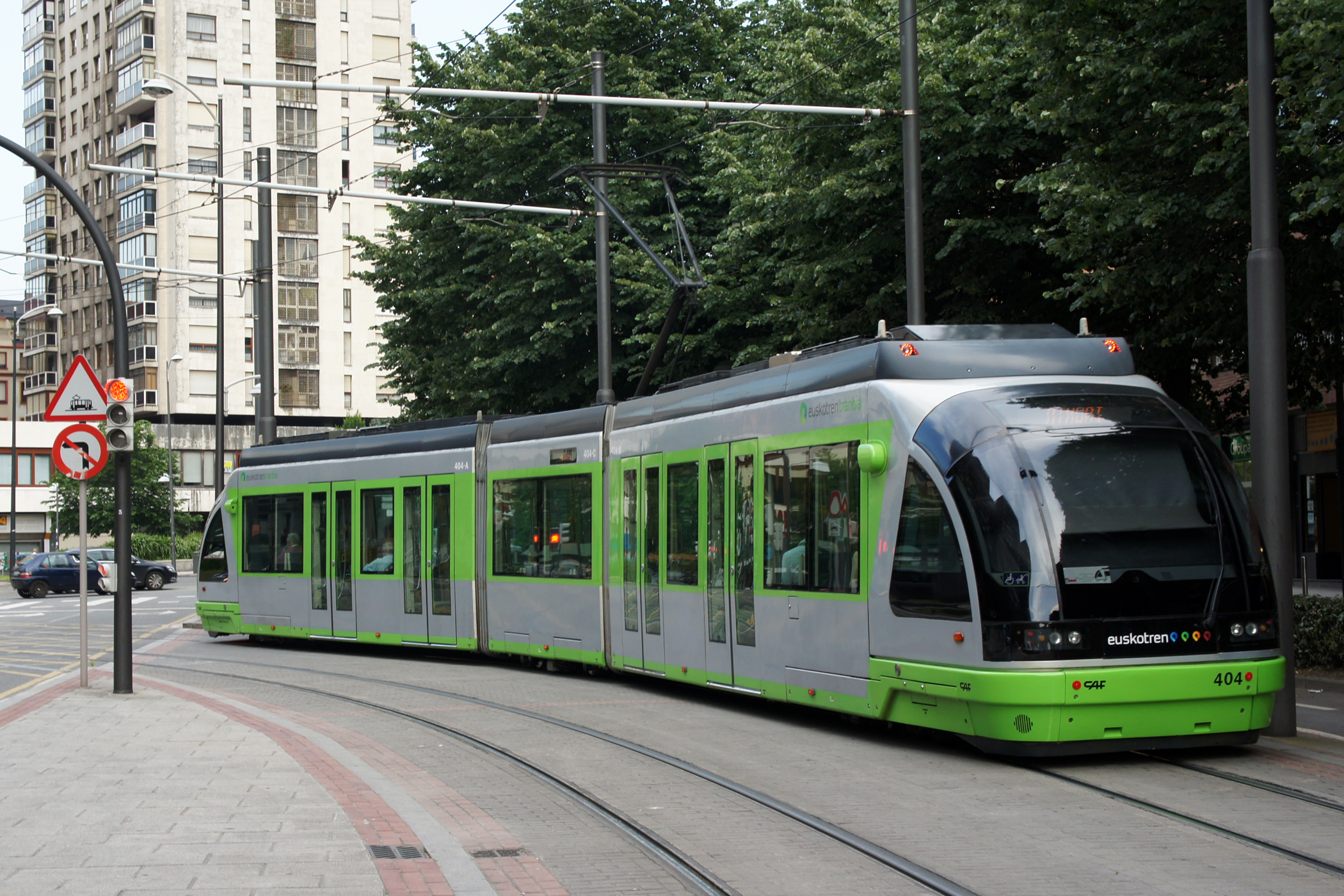
400 series tram

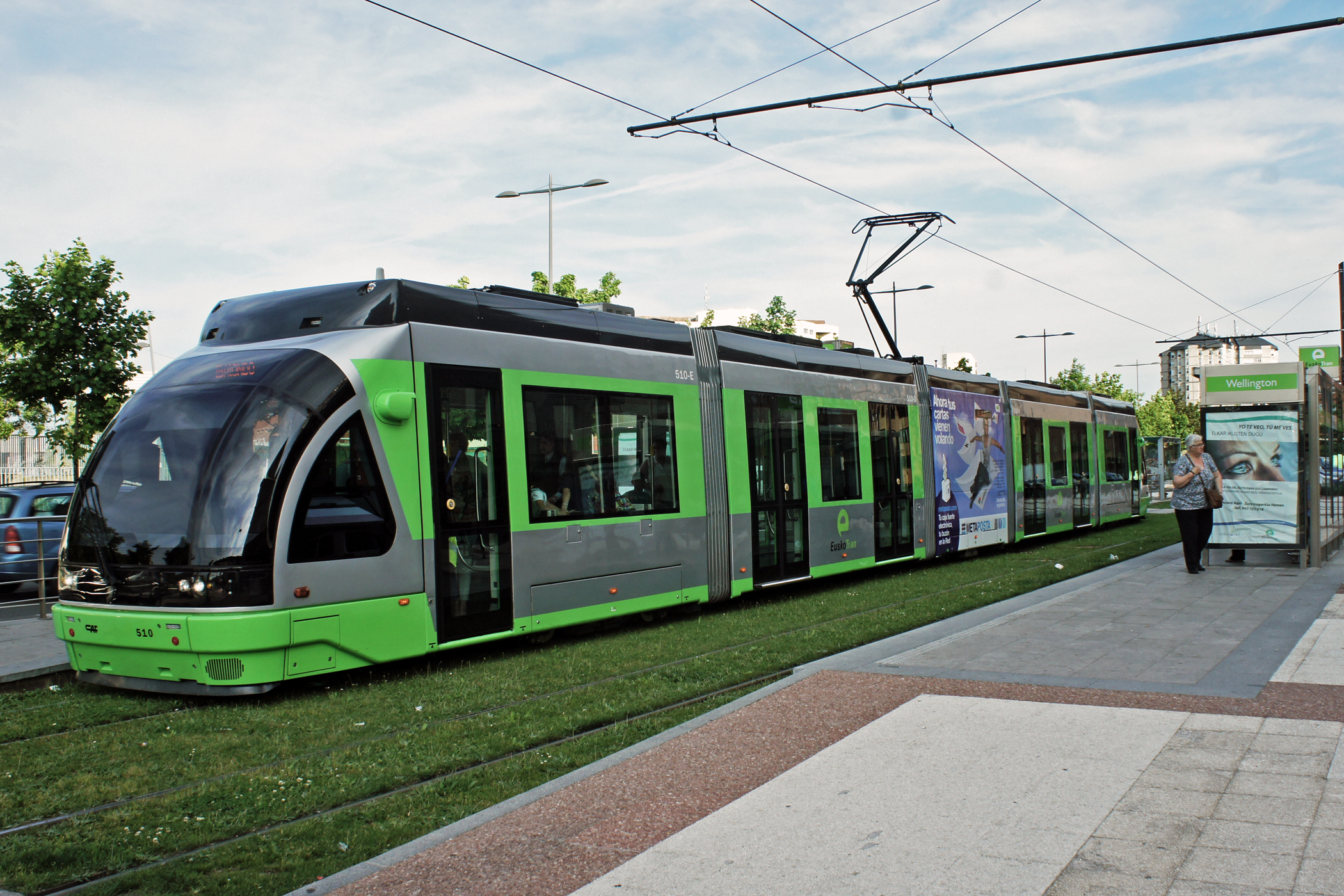
500 series tram

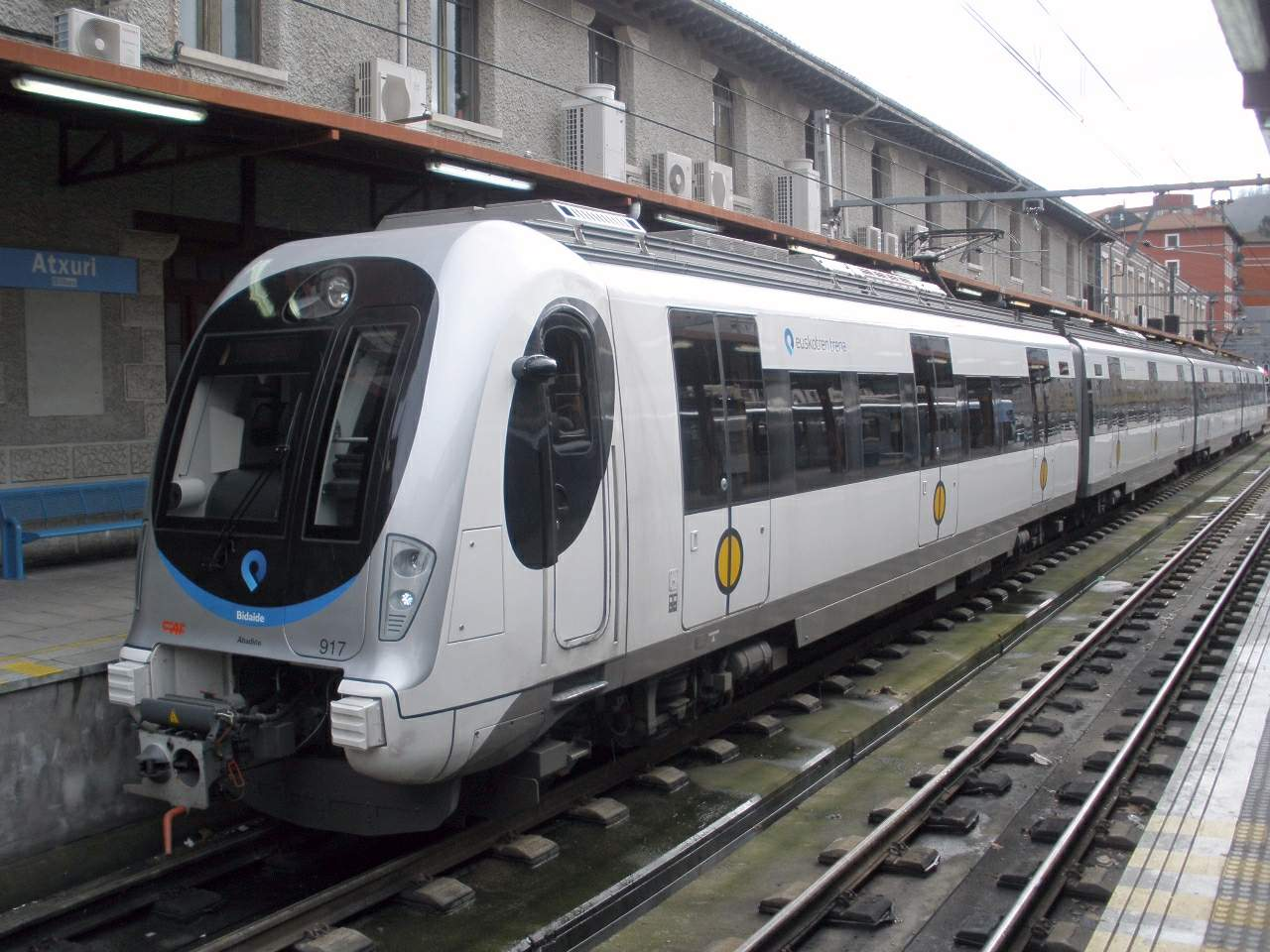
900 series EMU

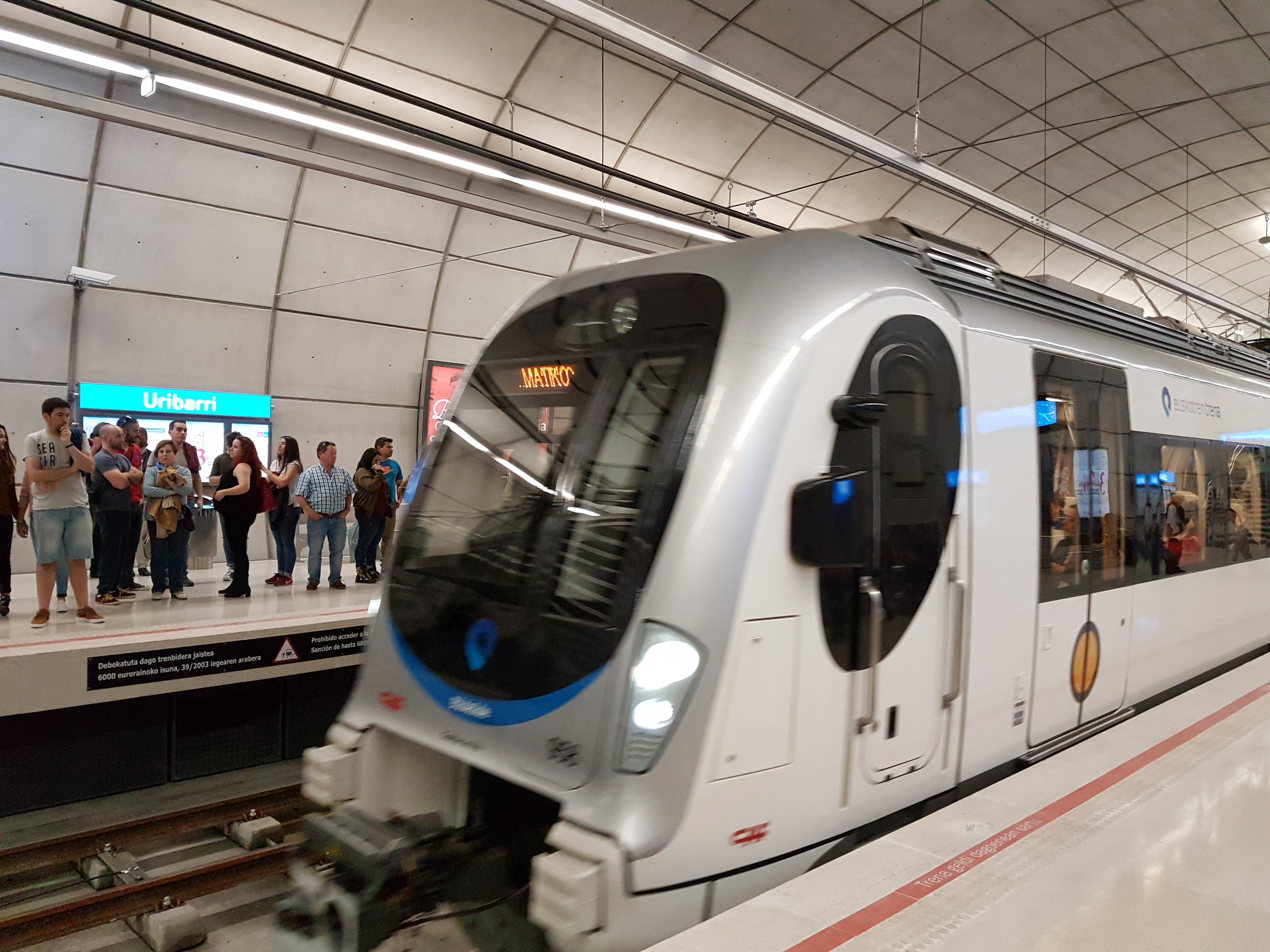
950 series EMU

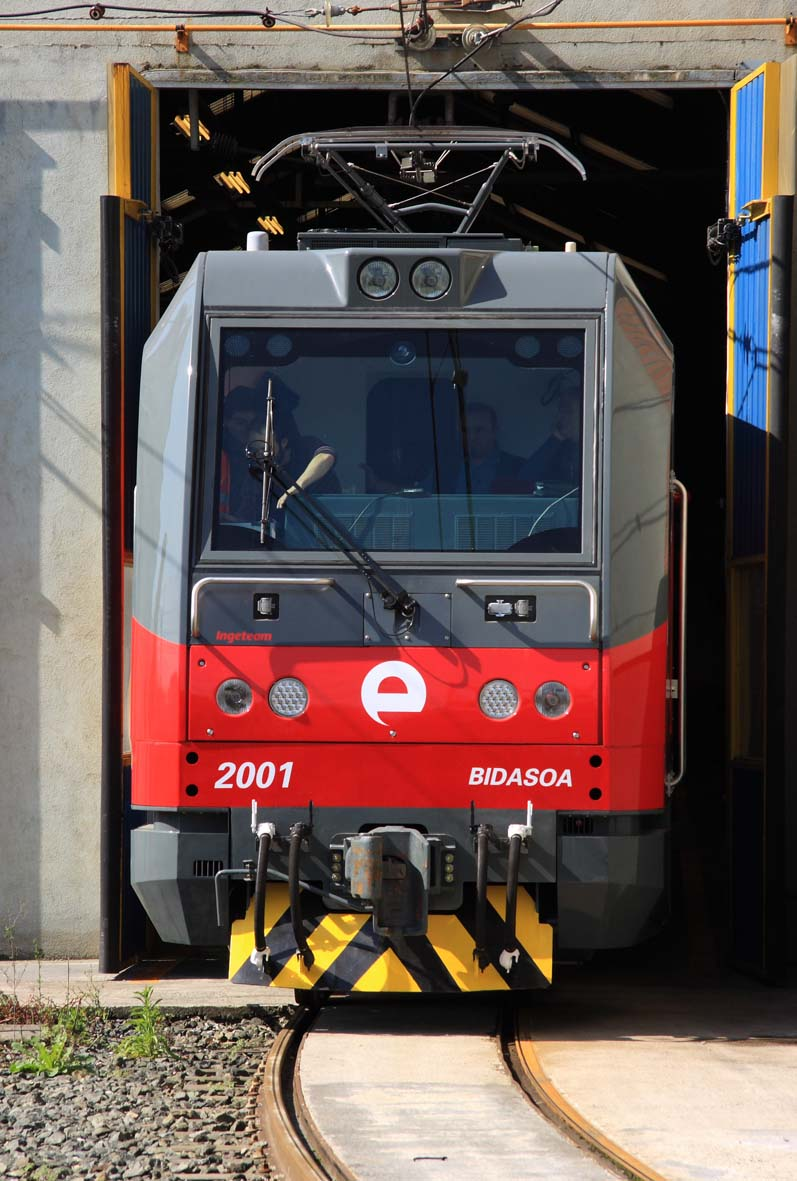
TD2000 series locomotive
