= Ferrocarriles de Vía Estrecha =

Spanish public railway operator

- Spanish Narrow-Gauge Railways

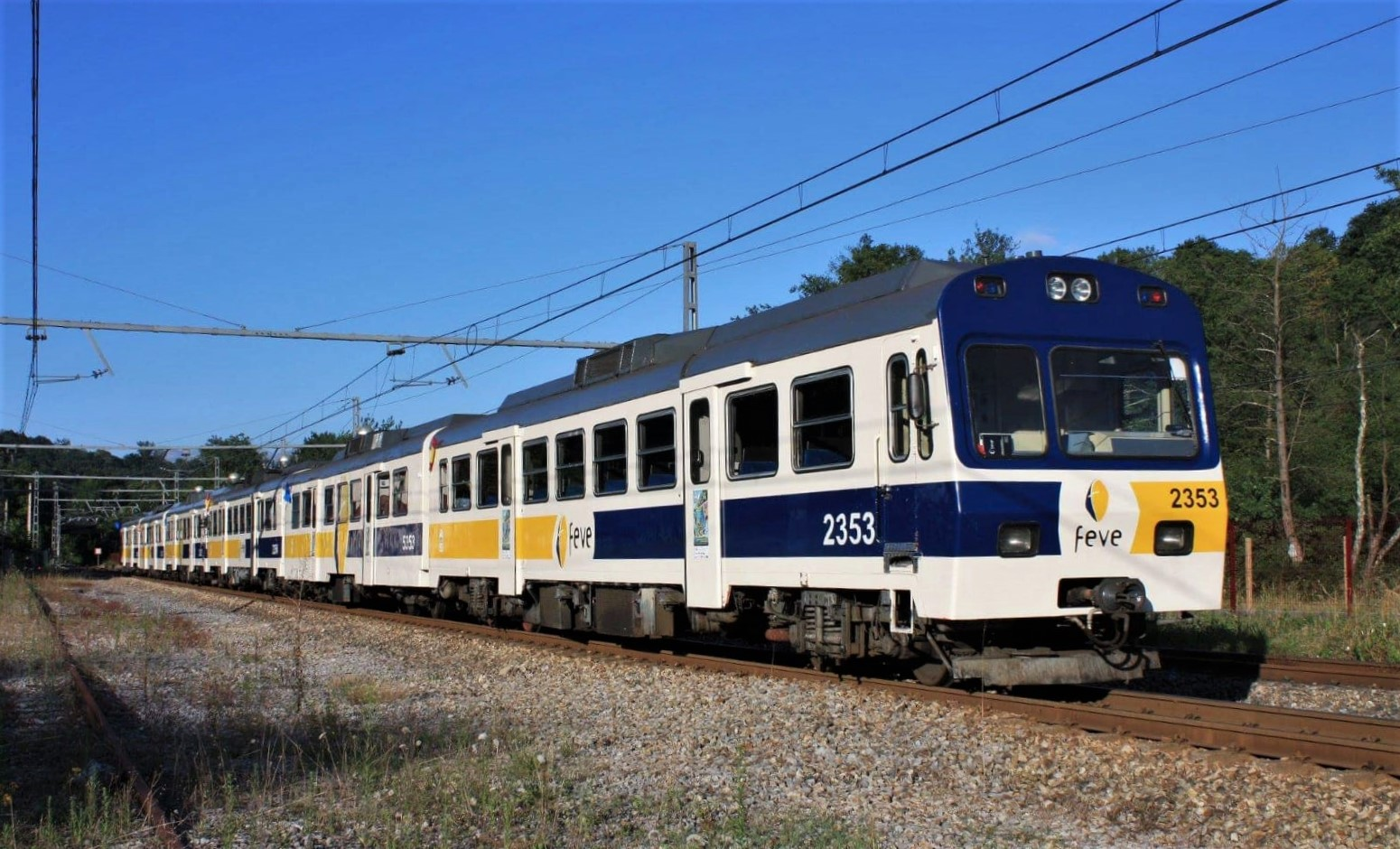
- Abbreviation: FEVE
- Predecessor: Explotación de Ferrocarriles por el Estado
- Successor: Renfe; Adif
- Formation: September 23, 1965
- Dissolved: December 31, 2012
- Type: State-owned enterprise
- Purpose: Rail transport
- Headquarters: Spain
- Owner: General State Administration, dependent on the Ministry of Development (Spain)
- Staff: 1968 (2005)

Ferrocarriles Españoles de Vía Estrecha (FEVE, Spanish Narrow-Gauge Railways), officially registered as Ferrocarriles de Vía Estrecha and known in its last years by the brand name Feve, was a Spanish public railway operator, founded in 1965, in charge of operating the national narrow-gauge network, whose management passed to the State after the extinction of the original owner companies. The entity depended on the Ministry of Development, being the second Spanish company in its sector, in terms of importance, after the also extinct RENFE. FEVE came to operate on a railway network of 1,250 km (780 mi) of tracks.

FEVE was extinguished on December 31, 2012, as a result of the Spanish Government's plan to unify the state-owned narrow and broad-gauge public operators. Similar to the process culminated with RENFE in 2004, FEVE's infrastructures (stations, tracks, etc.) were segregated in Adif. Its railway material, as well as the operation of its routes for freight and passengers, in addition to the rights over its corporate identity, were segregated in Renfe-Operadora. The latter continued FEVE's work in the fields of freight and passenger transport, respectively, through Renfe Mercancías and Renfe Viajeros (first as Renfe Feve, then as Renfe Cercanías AM and finally fully as Cercanías and MD, based on the service in 2025).

Throughout its history, FEVE simultaneously owned railways of five different track gauges: 1,435 mm (4 ft 8 1/2 in), 1062 mm, 1,000 mm (3 ft 3 3/8 in), 915 mm (3 ft) and 750 mm (2 ft 5 1/2 in).

== History ==
=== Creation and first years ===
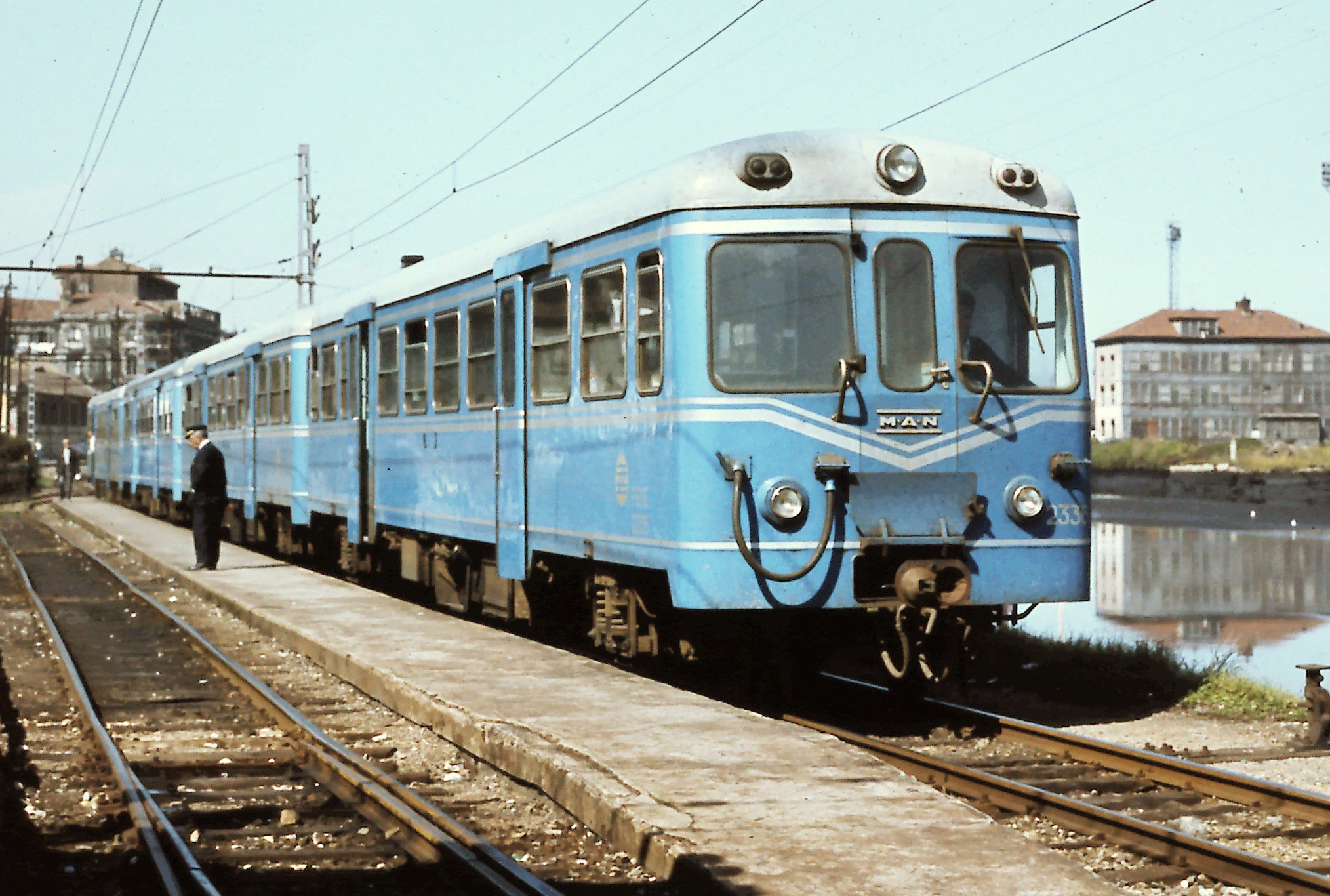
FEVE 2300 Series unit stationed in Avilés (1977).

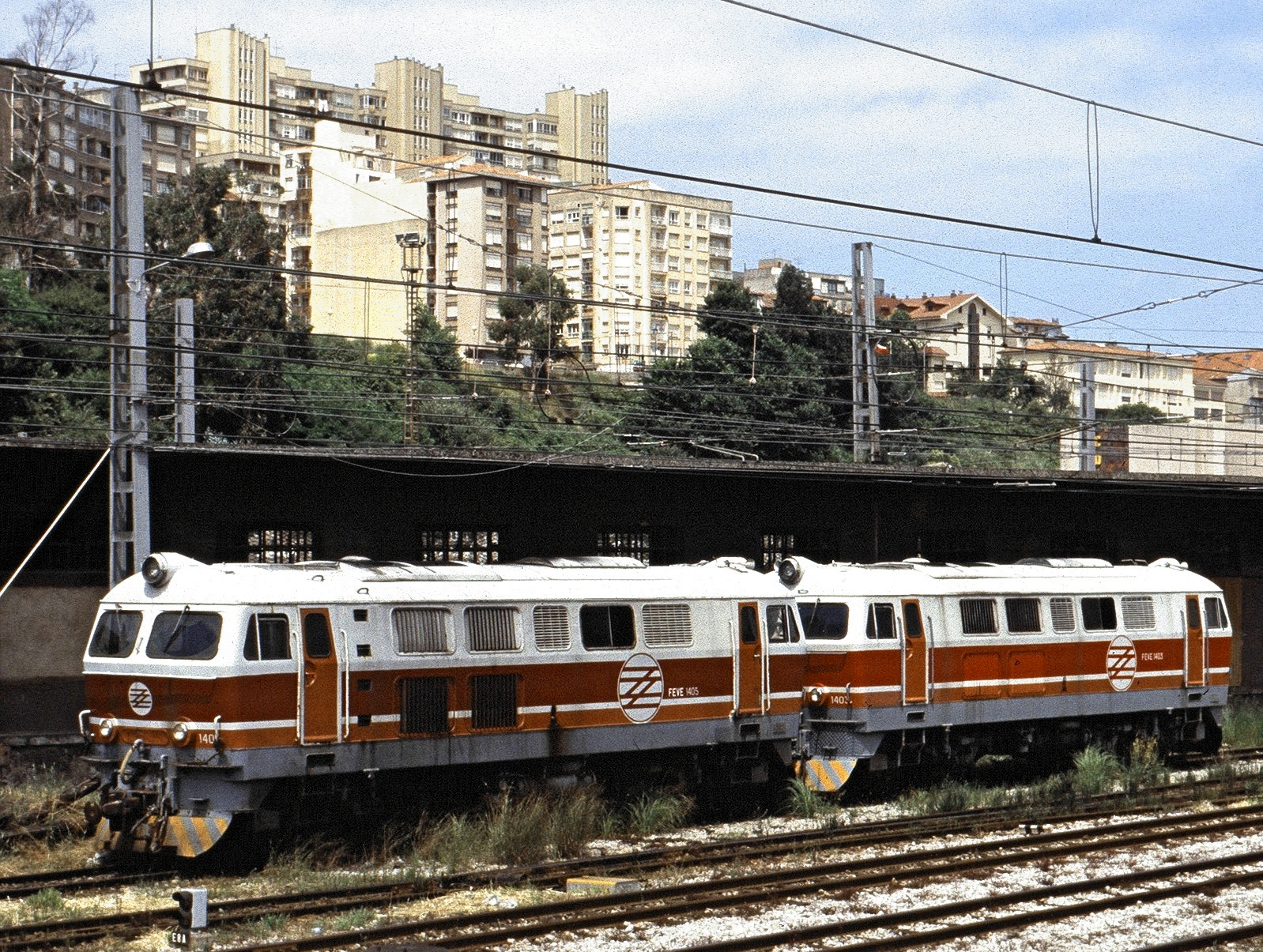
FEVE 1400 Series locomotives in Santander (1988).

The origins of FEVE are in the organization Explotación de Ferrocarriles por el Estado (EFE), which had been created in 1926 for the management of the state-built railway lines, or those that had passed to state management. After the creation of RENFE in 1941, EFE's scope of action was greatly reduced, since it was limited to the narrow-gauge railroads. The situation changed radically after 1960, when a large number of small mining railroads went bankrupt and the State came to their rescue. Due to the large number of lines that the State was forced to manage in such a short time, in order to streamline the administration, a new autonomous organization was formally created on September 23, 1965; that same day EFE changed its name to Ferrocarriles de Vía Estrecha (FEVE).

The FEVE network consisted of the lines of former companies such as Sociedad General de Ferrocarriles Vasco Asturiana, Ferrocarriles Económicos de Asturias, Ferrocarril de Langreo, Ferrocarril de Carreño, Ferrocarril Cantábrico, Ferrocarril Santander-Bilbao, Ferrocarril de La Robla, Ferrocarriles de Mallorca, Ferrocarril Cartagena-Los Blancos, in addition to the Ferrocarril Ferrol-Gijón, built entirely by the State. However, many of these railroads were in a very critical situation, with the railway material and/or infrastructure in great need of improvement. For this reason there were other narrow-gauge lines, such as those inherited through the Compañía de Ferrocarriles Secundarios de Castilla, which were closed soon after being considered loss-making.

The longest line owned by the company is 330 kilometers long, known as the Ferrocarril de La Robla. It originally ran from La Robla to Balmaseda and was built to transport coal from the mining industry in Leon and Palencia to the steel industry in Biscay. At the beginning of the 20th century the sections Balmaseda-Luchana and the access to Bilbao (taking advantage of the route of the Ferrocarril Santander-Bilbao) and Matallana-León were built, thus connecting the capitals of León and Bilbao. Currently the sections between Matallana de Torío and La Robla and Iráuregui-Luchana do not provide passenger service. It is the longest metric track in Europe, running through the eastern mountains of León, the north of the province of Palencia, the south of Cantabria, the north of the province of Burgos and Biscay.

In 1980 FEVE began to specialize in freight and regional and commuter passenger transport. On the other hand, it created the luxury tourist train Transcantábrico, which began its services in 1982, becoming the company's star service. It runs from Santiago de Compostela-Ferrol-Bilbao-León (the Santiago-Ferrol section is by bus).

In addition, the Ministry of Development made numerous investments to improve both the infrastructure and the rolling stock. After the cessions made to the autonomous regions, FEVE's railway network was mainly focused on the Cantabrian Coast. The main FEVE line in the Cantabrian Coast was the one connecting Ferrol with Bilbao through the provinces of Biscay, Cantabria, Asturias and Lugo. Also linked to this general line were several minor lines and branch lines, where, as a general rule, commuter trains provided service. These lines and branches were the following:

- In Asturias, the lines Trubia-Mieres-Collanzo, Pravia-San Esteban (the latter coming from the former Ferrocarril Vasco Asturiano), Gijón-Pola de Laviana (from the former Ferrocarril de Langreo) and the line Gijón-Avilés-Cudillero (heir of the Ferrocarril del Carreño and that of Ferrol-Gijón).
- In Cantabria there is a branch line that connects Liérganes with Orejo, station of the Bilbao - Santander section.

There are also several industrial branches that connect the general FEVE network with loading stations of private industries and seaports. FEVE was also the owner of the international section Puente Internacional in Irun-Hendaye, of the line popularly known as "El Topo", although the operation was ceded to Euskotren. In Asturias and Cantabria, FEVE had an important network of commuter lines. In Galicia it operated the commuter line between Ferrol and Ortigueira. In the Region of Murcia it also had a line between Cartagena and Los Nietos.

=== Transfer to autonomous communities ===
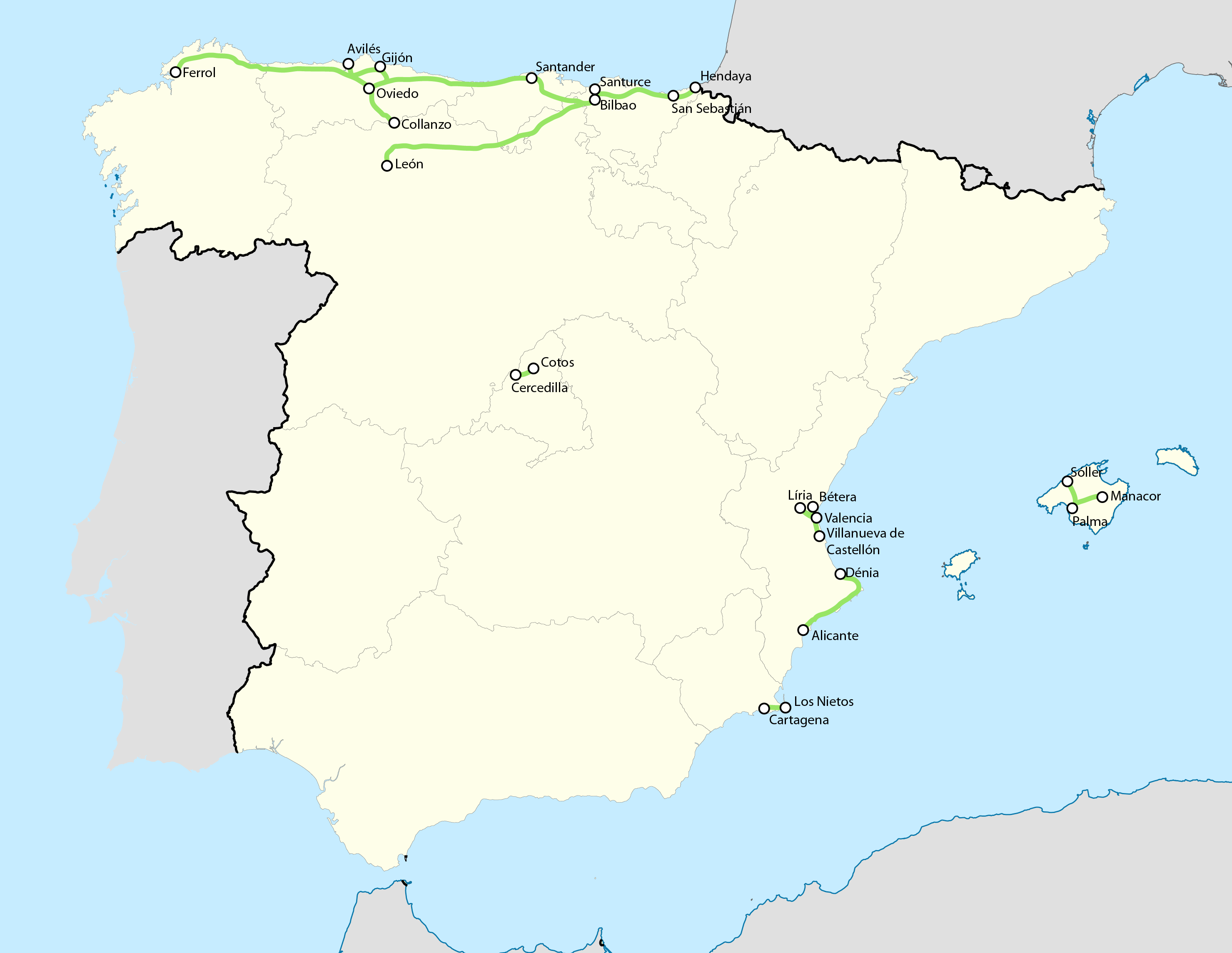
Spain's metric gauge network.

After the approval of the 1978 Constitution, and in accordance with the state of autonomies it established, as of 1979 a significant part of the narrow gauge network was transferred by the central government to the new autonomous communities, which began to manage it through public bodies:

- Eusko Trenbideak - Ferrocarriles Vascos (ET/FV): created by the Basque Government in 1982, it came to operate several lines in the provinces of Gipuzkoa and Biscay.
- Ferrocarrils de la Generalitat de Catalunya (FGC): created in 1979, it began operating several regional and/or commuter lines in the province of Barcelona.
- Ferrocarrils de la Generalitat Valenciana (FGV): created in 1986, it began operating several regional and/or commuter lines in the Valencian Community.
- Serveis Ferroviaris de Mallorca (SFM): created in 1994, it operates several lines on the island of Mallorca.

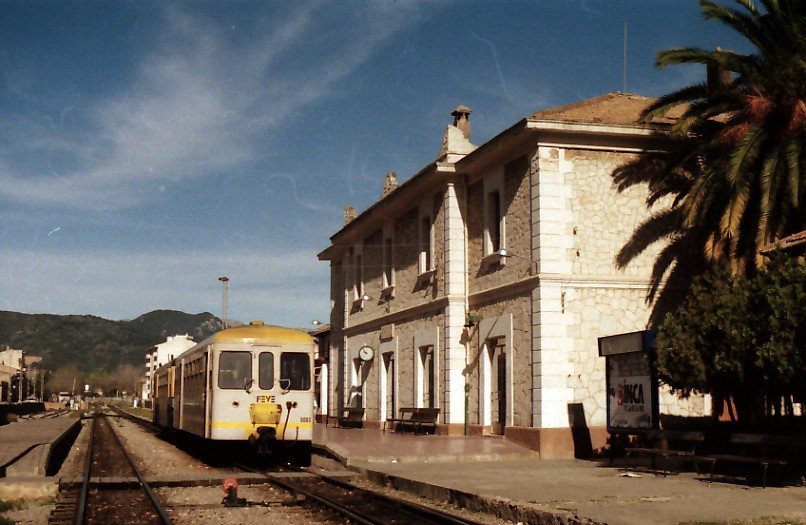
FEVE train at Inca station (Mallorca) in March 1990.

=== Last years and disappearance ===
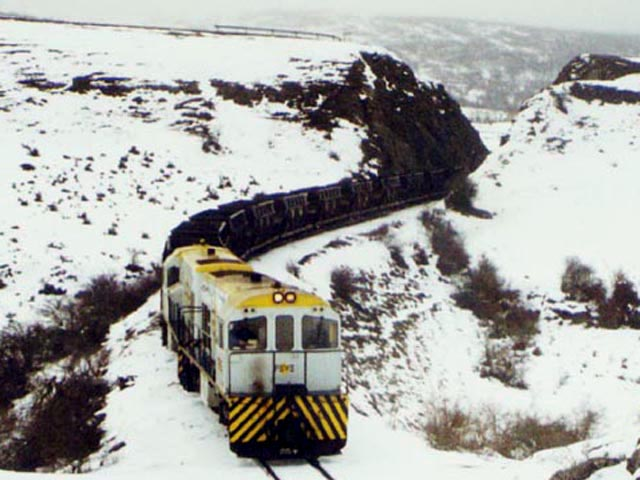
FEVE freight train running on the La Robla railway, around 1998.

In 2005 FEVE, faced with the new Spanish railway scenario characterized by liberalization and opening to competition (from which FEVE was initially exempted), the public entity undertakes a strategic plan that sets the guidelines for the company in the medium term to start the process of railway liberalization required by the European Union. The plan emphasizes the optimization of human resources and specialization by sector, creating management divisions (similar to Renfe's Business Units), which will specialize in their corresponding markets. The strategic plan aims to increase the company's coverage index by 12 points to 45%, with emphasis on the search for income by attracting tourist traffic and new freight customers, as well as its consolidation in commuter and regional train passengers.

Different public bodies —such as the Court of Auditors and the General State Comptroller— have pointed out FEVE's budgetary mismanagement during the period 2005–2012, estimating an increase in FEVE's debt from 191 to 569 million euros due to numerous "irregularities". In the years of presidency of Ángel Villalba, who was president of FEVE during the government of José Luis Rodríguez Zapatero, there were also several controversies surrounding his management of FEVE: in 2011, while he was still president, four railway convoys were initially acquired (although the number was eventually raised to 28 trains) that had to be scrapped and resold again, because they were ordered without ever having a railway network on which they could run.

On July 20, 2012, Royal Decree-Law 22/2012 [1], of July 20, 2012, was approved, whereby FEVE was extinguished on December 31, 2012, and the infrastructure was subrogated to Adif and the operation of the trains to Renfe-Operadora. In this way, the national broad-gauge and narrow-gauge networks were unified. In practice, Renfe continued to use the Feve brand to refer to all the passenger services it inherited from the previous company, until 2021, when it began to progressively replace the Renfe Feve brand with Renfe Cercanías AM.

== Operations ==
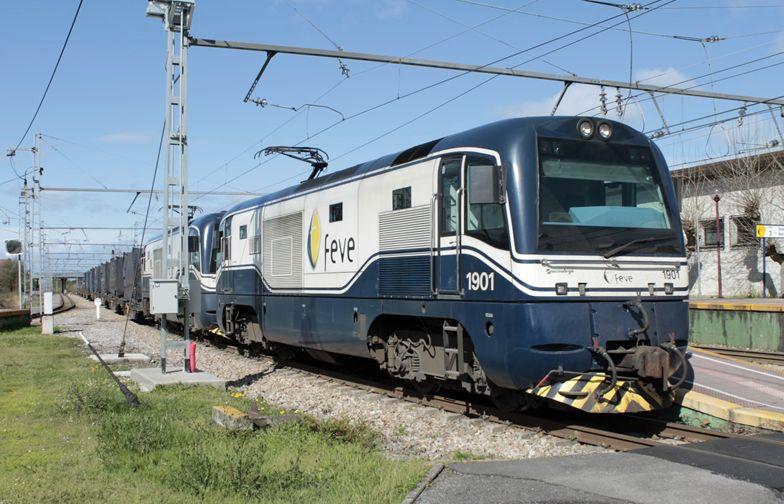
Double FEVE electro-diesel locomotive 1915 at El Berrón station with a freight train

=== Transcantábrico line ===
An exclusive tourist service operated by FEVE is a 650 km (400 mi) long line, the Transcantábrico, which runs along the entire length of Spain's north coast, and has connected the cities of San Sebastián, Bilbao, Santander, Oviedo and Ferrol to Leon since 1982. Operated as a holiday service, the carriages of the train are furnished with bedrooms, lounges and restaurants and voyages typically last eight days and seven nights.

FEVE also operated "normal" regional (express and stopping) services (in sections) from Ferrol to Hendaye (some sections operated now by regional operators) until 1978. One of the longest regular (non-tourist) FEVE service operated between Leon and Bilbao (a journey of some 7 hours).

=== Commuter services ===
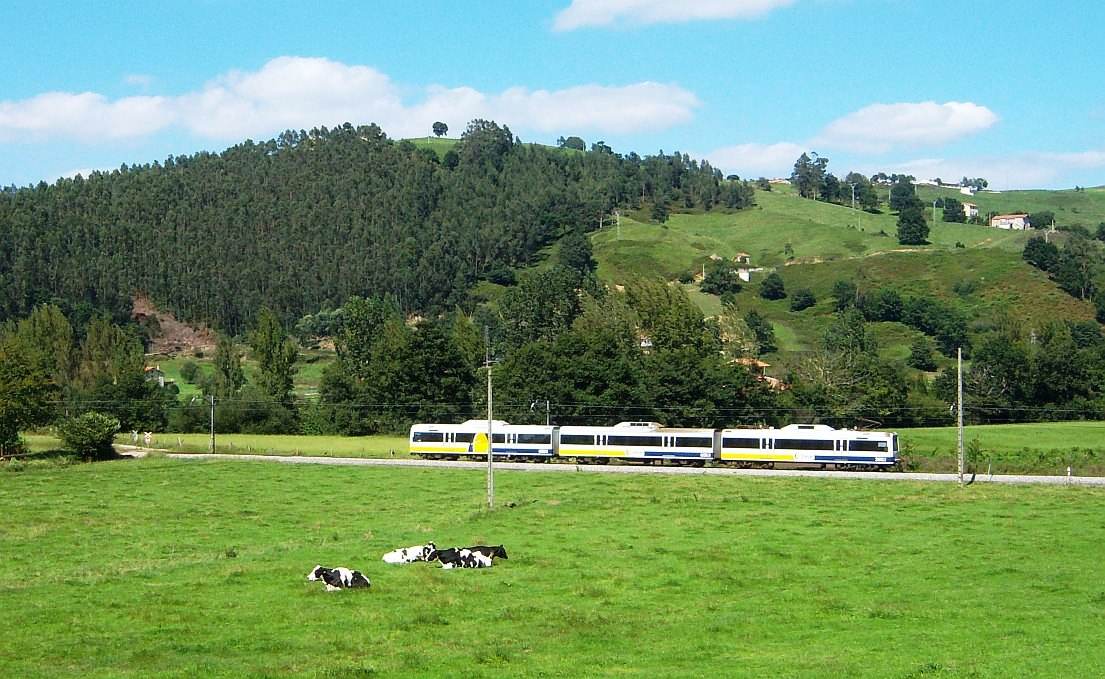
FEVE unit from Santander to Liérganes

Feve also operated a range of cercanías or commuter services. The main commuter area is Cercanías Asturias, where the dense five-line FEVE network was semi-integrated with the RENFE lines and works effectively as a regional metro system.

The Bilbao area has a line running from Bilbao's Concordia station to the town of Balmaseda, calling at local villages and settlements on its way through Biscay, as well as the main towns of Sodupe, Aranguren, and Zalla.

Two commuter lines begin at Santander railway station and terminate at Liérganes and Cabezón de la Sal.

In southern Spain, Feve operatesd the historic Cartagena–Los Nietos line.

== Presidents ==
Name	Start	End
Jesús Santos Rein	November 7, 1968	November 14, 1969
Camilo Mira Muñoz	November 14, 1969	June 9, 1972
Jaime Badillo	June 9, 1972	February 18, 1977
Manuel de Vicente González	February 18, 1977	July 29, 1977
Javier Sagües Martínez de Azagra	January 29, 1978	December 29, 1982
Fernando de Esteban	December 29, 1982	December 12, 1986
Joaquín Martínez Vilanova	December 12, 1986	November 30, 1990
Gonzalo Martín Baranda	November 30, 1990	December 10, 1994
José María Gurruchaga	January 13, 1995	February 12, 1999
Eugenio Damborenea	1999	2004
Dimas Sañudo	April 30, 2004	March 28, 2008
Ángel Villalba	June 17, 2008	January 20, 2012
Marcelino Oreja	January 20, 2012	December 31, 2012

== Motor equipment ==
=== Locomotives ===
Model	Image	Serial No.	Manufacturer	Year	Notes
1000 Series		1021-1063	**Alsthom**, Levallois-Perret	1955	Some of them transformed into 1900 Series.
1100 Series		1101-1121	**Creusot - SECN**Sestao,	1950's	
1200 Series		1201-1210	**Batignolles - CAF**, Beasain	1950's	Acquired by the Ministry of Development for several narrow-gauge companies, later used by FEVE.
1300 Series		1318-1325	**SECN**, Sestao	1966	The 1322 remains on display at Cistierna. Shunting vehicle.
1400 Series		1421-1425	**Henschel**, Electro-Motive Division	1956 - 1959	
**1500 Series**		1501-1510 1511–1515	**General Electric, Eire Babcock & Wilcox,** Sestao	1964 - 1974	Known as GECo. The 1514 sold to Argentina. 1503, 1504, 1508 and 1502 sold to Madagascar. Currently only 1505 and 1510 remain (both in Aboño).
**1600 Series**		1651-1660	**M.T.M.**, Barcelona	1981	Under Alsthom license.
**1900 Series**		1901-1917	**FEVE**, El Berrón **CAF-Sunsundegui,** Alsasua	2002	Rebuilt from 1000 Series.

=== Diesel units ===
Model	Image	Serial No.	Manufacturer	Year	Notes
2000 Series		2001 - 2006 2011- 2029	**Ferrostaal**	1957	Acquired by the Ministry of Development for several narrow-gauge companies, later used by FEVE.
2100 Series		2101 - 2104 2111 - 2131 2141 - 2145	**Billard**	1957	
2200 Series		2201 - 2202	**MAN**	1955	
2300 Series		2301 - 2373	**MAN**	1966	
**2400 Series**		2401 - 2479	**MTM**, Barcelona	1983	Acquired by FEVE for other lines. Most sold to the Instituto Costarricense de Ferrocarriles (Costa Rica).
2500 Series		2501 and 2551	**MTM**, Barcelona	1988	Refurbished and integrated into the 2400 Series as 2401 and 2451.
**2600 Series**		2601 - 2624	**CAF-Sunsundegui,** Alsasua	1994	Manufactured from the reconstruction of 2300 Series units.
**2700 Series**		2701 -	**CAF-Sunsundegui,** Alsasua	2009	Newly built model. 23 units ordered, incorporation began in August 2009.
**2900 Series**		2901 -	**CAF-Sunsundegui,** Alsasua	2009	New construction model. Derived from the 2700

=== Electrical units ===
Model	Image	Serial No.	Manufacturer	Year	Notes
**3300 Series**		3301-3323	**CAF-Sunsundegui**	2009	They were part of the 3500 Series, refurbished with three-phase motors.
**3500 Series**		3516-3537	**CAF-Sunsundegui**	1977	
**3600 Series**		3601-3624 3625–3642	**CAF-Sunsundegui-Siemens**	2000	Manufactured from the rebuilding of 2600 Series units.
**3800 Series**		3801-3816	**CAF-Sunsundegui**	1992	

NOTE: In bold, models that were still active at the time of the company's demise.
