= List of Metrovalencia stations =

The following is a list of the 139 stations in the Metrovalencia hybrid metro/tram system in Valencia, Spain. The Metrovalencia network consists of 156.4 kilometres (97.2 mi) of route. A 27.3-kilometre (17.0 mi) portion of this network, serving a total of 35 stations, is underground. The remaining 129.1 kilometres (80.2 mi) of route, serving 104 stations, is at-grade.

== Legend ==
- Boldface: Terminus station
- Italics: Request-stop station

== List ==
Station	Lines	Opened	Type	Character	Notes
À Punt	Line 4 (Metrovalencia)	1999	Tram	At-grade	Renamed from TVV as part of the name overhaul of May 2022. TVV (Televisió Valenciana) was dissolved by the government in November 2013. In 2018 a new state-owned broadcasting body was founded which now runs À Punt.
**Aeroport**	Line 3 (Metrovalencia) Line 5 (Metrovalencia)	2007	Metro	Underground	
**Alacant**	Line 10 (Metrovalencia)	2022	Tram	Underground	
Alameda	Line 3 (Metrovalencia) Line 5 (Metrovalencia) Line 7 (Metrovalencia) Line 9 (Metrovalencia)	1995	Metro	Underground	
Albalat dels Sorells	Line 3 (Metrovalencia)	1995	Suburban train	At-grade	
Alberic	Line 1 (Metrovalencia)	1988	Suburban train	At-grade	
Alboraia Palmaret	Line 3 (Metrovalencia) Line 9 (Metrovalencia)	1995/2010	Metro	Underground	Originally an at-grade suburban train station called Palmaret. Renamed to Alboraya-Palmaret and put underground in December 2010. In May 2022, its name was changed along with 21 other stations.
**Alboraia Peris Aragó**	Line 3 (Metrovalencia) Line 9 (Metrovalencia)	1995/2010	Metro	Underground	Originally an at-grade suburban train station called Alboraya. Renamed and put underground in December 2010. In May 2022, its name was changed along with 21 other stations.
Alfauir	Line 6 (Metrovalencia)	2007	Tram	At-grade	
Alginet	Line 1 (Metrovalencia)	1988	Suburban train	At-grade	
Almàssera	Line 3 (Metrovalencia)	1995	Suburban train	At-grade	
Amado Granell-Montolivet	Line 10 (Metrovalencia)	2022	Tram	Underground	
Amistat	Line 5 (Metrovalencia) Line 7 (Metrovalencia)	2003	Metro	Underground	Originally Amistat, changed its named to Amistat-Casa de Salud in 2014 after a sponsorship agreement. Reverted to its original name in May 2022.
Àngel Guimerà	Line 1 (Metrovalencia) Line 2 (Metrovalencia) Line 3 (Metrovalencia) Line 5 (Metrovalencia) Line 9 (Metrovalencia)	1988	Metro	Underground	
Aragó	Line 5 (Metrovalencia) Line 7 (Metrovalencia)	2003	Metro	Underground	Renamed from Aragón as part of the name overhaul of May 2022.
Ausiàs March	Line 1 (Metrovalencia)	1988	Suburban train	At-grade	
**Avinguda del Cid**	Line 3 (Metrovalencia) Line 5 (Metrovalencia) Line 9 (Metrovalencia)	1998	Metro	Underground	
Ayora	Line 5 (Metrovalencia) Line 7 (Metrovalencia)	2003	Metro	Underground	
Bailén	Line 7 (Metrovalencia)	2005	Metro	Underground	
Benaguasil	Line 2 (Metrovalencia)	1988	Suburban train	At-grade	Renamed from Benaguasil 2n as part of the name overhaul of May 2022.
Benicalap	Line 4 (Metrovalencia)	1994	Tram	At-grade	
Beniferri	Line 1 (Metrovalencia) Line 2 (Metrovalencia)	1988	Metro	Underground	
Benimaclet	Line 3 (Metrovalencia) Line 4 (Metrovalencia) Line 6 (Metrovalencia) Line 9 (Metrovalencia)	1995	Metro/Tram	Underground	
Benimàmet	Line 2 (Metrovalencia)	1988/2011	Suburban train	Underground	Originally an at-grade suburban train station; put underground in May 2011.
Benimodo	Line 1 (Metrovalencia)	1988	Suburban train	At-grade	
**Bétera**	Line 1 (Metrovalencia)	1988	Suburban train	At-grade	
Beteró	Line 4 (Metrovalencia) Line 6 (Metrovalencia)	1994	Tram	At-grade	Renamed from Serrería as part of the name overhaul of May 2022.
Burjassot	Line 1 (Metrovalencia)	1988	Suburban train	At-grade	
Burjassot-Godella	Line 1 (Metrovalencia)	1988	Suburban train	At-grade	
Cabanyal	Line 4 (Metrovalencia) Line 6 (Metrovalencia)	1994	Tram	At-grade	Northbound-direction only. Renamed from La Marina as part of the name overhaul of May 2022.
Campament	Line 2 (Metrovalencia)	1988	Suburban train	At-grade	
Campanar	Line 1 (Metrovalencia) Line 2 (Metrovalencia)	1988	Metro	Underground	
Campus	Line 4 (Metrovalencia)	1999	Tram	At-grade	
Cantereria	Line 2 (Metrovalencia)	1988	Suburban train	At-grade	
Canyamelar	Line 6 (Metrovalencia)	2007	Tram	At-grade	Renamed from Mediterrani as part of the name overhaul of May 2022.
Carlet	Line 1 (Metrovalencia)	1988	Suburban train	At-grade	
**Castelló**	Line 1 (Metrovalencia)	1988	Suburban train	At-grade	Renamed from Villanueva de Castellón as part of the name overhaul of May 2022. The town that gives name to the station officially changed names in 2020.
**Ciutat Arts i Ciències-Justícia**	Line 10 (Metrovalencia)	2022	Tram	At-grade	
Col·legi El Vedat	Line 1 (Metrovalencia)	1988	Suburban train	At-grade	
Colón	Line 3 (Metrovalencia) Line 5 (Metrovalencia) Line 7 (Metrovalencia) Line 9 (Metrovalencia)	1998	Metro	Underground	
**Doctor Lluch**	Line 4 (Metrovalencia) Line 6 (Metrovalencia)	1994	Tram	At-grade	Northbound-direction only
El Clot	Line 2 (Metrovalencia)	1988	Suburban train	At-grade	
**Empalme**	Line 1 (Metrovalencia) Line 2 (Metrovalencia) Line 4 (Metrovalencia)	1988	Metro/Tram	At-grade	
Entrepins	Line 2 (Metrovalencia)	1988	Suburban train	At-grade	
Espioca	Line 1 (Metrovalencia)	1988	Suburban train	At-grade	
Estadi Ciutat de València	Line 6 (Metrovalencia)	2007	Tram	At-grade	Renamed from Estadi del Llevant as part of the name overhaul of May 2022
Facultats-Manuel Broseta	Line 3 (Metrovalencia) Line 9 (Metrovalencia)	1995	Metro	Underground	Renamed from Facultats in memory of Manuel Broseta on the 30th anniversary of his assassination.
Faitanar	Line 3 (Metrovalencia) Line 5 (Metrovalencia) Line 9 (Metrovalencia)	2007	Metro	Underground	
**Fira València**	Line 4 (Metrovalencia)	2000	Tram	At-grade	Special events service only
Florista	Line 4 (Metrovalencia)	1994	Tram	At-grade	
Foios	Line 3 (Metrovalencia)	1995	Suburban train	At-grade	
Fondo de Benaguasil	Line 2 (Metrovalencia)	1988	Suburban train	At-grade	Renamed from Benaguasil 1r as part of the name overhaul of May 2022.
Font Almaguer	Line 1 (Metrovalencia)	1988	Suburban train	At-grade	
Font del Barranc	Line 1 (Metrovalencia)	2024	Suburban train	At-grade	Opened for the first time when Line 2's service reopened to Lliria after Valencia's 2024 flood
Francesc Cubells	Line 6 (Metrovalencia) Line 8 (Metrovalencia)	2007	Tram	At-grade	
Fuente del Jarro	Line 2 (Metrovalencia)	1988	Suburban train	At-grade	
Gallipont-Torre del Virrei	Line 2 (Metrovalencia)	2007	Suburban train	At-grade	Renamed from Torre del Virrei as part of the name overhaul of May 2022.
Garbí	Line 4 (Metrovalencia)	1994	Tram	At-grade	
Godella	Line 1 (Metrovalencia)	1988	Suburban train	At-grade	
Grau-La Marina	Line 6 (Metrovalencia) Line 8 (Metrovalencia)	2007	Tram	At-grade	Originally called Grau; name changed in December 2010. Renamed from Grau-Canyamelar as part of the name overhaul of May 2022.
Horta Vella	Line 1 (Metrovalencia)	1988	Suburban train	At-grade	Renamed from Sanatori Psiquiàtric in November 2016.
Jesús	Line 1 (Metrovalencia) Line 2 (Metrovalencia) Line 7 (Metrovalencia)	1988	Metro	Underground	Opened as Jesús; renamed Joaquín Sorolla in December 2010 following an accident which killed 43 people. Renamed Joaquín Sorolla-Jesús in July 2011. Reverted to its current name on 30 June 2016.
L'Alcúdia	Line 1 (Metrovalencia)	1988	Suburban train	At-grade	
L'Eliana	Line 2 (Metrovalencia)	1988	Suburban train	At-grade	
La Cadena	Line 4 (Metrovalencia) Line 6 (Metrovalencia)	1994	Tram	At-grade	
La Canyada	Line 2 (Metrovalencia)	1988	Suburban train	At-grade	
La Carrasca	Line 4 (Metrovalencia) Line 6 (Metrovalencia)	1994	Tram	At-grade	
La Coma	Line 4 (Metrovalencia)	2005	Tram	At-grade	
La Cova	Line 9 (Metrovalencia)	2015	Suburban train	At-grade	
La Granja	Line 4 (Metrovalencia)	1999	Tram	At-grade	
La Pobla de Farnals	Line 3 (Metrovalencia)	1995	Suburban train	At-grade	
La Pobla de Vallbona	Line 2 (Metrovalencia)	1988	Suburban train	At-grade	
La Presa	Line 9 (Metrovalencia)	2015	Suburban train	At-grade	
La Vallesa	Line 2 (Metrovalencia)	1988	Suburban train	At-grade	
Les Carolines-Fira	Line 2 (Metrovalencia)	1988/2011	Suburban train	Underground	Originally an at-grade suburban train station; put underground in May 2011.
**Llíria**	Line 2 (Metrovalencia)	1988	Suburban train	At-grade	
**Lloma Llarga-Terramelar**	Line 4 (Metrovalencia)	2005	Tram	At-grade	
Machado	Line 3 (Metrovalencia) Line 9 (Metrovalencia)	1995	Metro	Underground	
Manises	Line 3 (Metrovalencia) Line 5 (Metrovalencia) Line 9 (Metrovalencia)	2007	Metro	Underground	
**Marítim**	Line 5 (Metrovalencia) Line 6 (Metrovalencia) Line 7 (Metrovalencia) Line 8 (Metrovalencia)	2007	Metro/Tram	Underground	Renamed from Marítim-Serrería as part of the name overhaul of May 2022.
Marxalenes	Line 4 (Metrovalencia)	1994	Tram	At-grade	
Massalavés	Line 1 (Metrovalencia)	1988	Suburban train	At-grade	
**Mas del Rosari**	Line 4 (Metrovalencia)	2005	Tram	At-grade	
Masia de Traver	Line 9 (Metrovalencia)	2015	Suburban train	At-grade	
Masies	Line 1 (Metrovalencia)	1988	Suburban train	At-grade	
Massamagrell	Line 3 (Metrovalencia)	1995	Suburban train	At-grade	
Massarrojos	Line 1 (Metrovalencia)	1988	Suburban train	At-grade	
Meliana	Line 3 (Metrovalencia)	1995	Suburban train	At-grade	
Mislata	Line 3 (Metrovalencia) Line 5 (Metrovalencia) Line 9 (Metrovalencia)	1999	Metro	Underground	
Mislata-Almassil	Line 3 (Metrovalencia) Line 5 (Metrovalencia) Line 9 (Metrovalencia)	1999	Metro	Underground	
Moncada-Alfara	Line 1 (Metrovalencia)	1988	Suburban train	At-grade	
Montesol	Line 2 (Metrovalencia)	1988	Suburban train	At-grade	
Montortal	Line 1 (Metrovalencia)	1988	Suburban train	At-grade	
Moreres	Line 10 (Metrovalencia)	2022	Tram	At-grade	
Museros	Line 3 (Metrovalencia)	1995	Suburban train	At-grade	
**Natzaret**	Line 10 (Metrovalencia)	2022	Tram	At-grade	
**Neptú**	Line 8 (Metrovalencia)	2007	Tram	At-grade	Renamed to Marina Reial Joan Carles I in April 2013. In May 2022 it reverted to its original name.
Nou d'Octubre	Line 3 (Metrovalencia) Line 5 (Metrovalencia) Line 9 (Metrovalencia)	1999	Metro	Underground	
Oceanogràfic	Line 10 (Metrovalencia)	2022	Tram	At-grade	
Omet	Line 1 (Metrovalencia)	1988	Suburban train	At-grade	
Orriols	Line 6 (Metrovalencia)	2007	Tram	At-grade	
Paiporta	Line 1 (Metrovalencia) Line 2 (Metrovalencia) Line 7 (Metrovalencia)	1988	Metro	At-grade	
Palau de Congressos	Line 4 (Metrovalencia)	1994	Tram	At-grade	
Parc Científic	Line 4 (Metrovalencia)	2005	Tram	At-grade	Originally called Santa Gemma; name changed in December 2010. Renamed from Santa Gemma-Parc Científic UV as part of the name overhaul of May 2022.
**Paterna**	Line 2 (Metrovalencia)	1988	Suburban train	At-grade	
Patraix	Line 1 (Metrovalencia) Line 2 (Metrovalencia) Line 7 (Metrovalencia)	1988	Metro	Underground	
Picanya	Line 1 (Metrovalencia) Line 2 (Metrovalencia) Line 7 (Metrovalencia)	1988	Metro	At-grade	
**Picassent**	Line 1 (Metrovalencia)	1988	Suburban train	At-grade	
Plaça d'Espanya	Line 1 (Metrovalencia) Line 2 (Metrovalencia)	1988	Metro	Underground	
Platja Les Arenes	Line 4 (Metrovalencia) Line 6 (Metrovalencia)	1994	Tram	At-grade	Southbound-direction only. Renamed from Les Arenes as part of the name overhaul of May 2022.
Platja Malva-rosa	Line 4 (Metrovalencia) Line 6 (Metrovalencia)	1994	Tram	At-grade	Southbound-direction only. Renamed from Eugenia Viñes as part of the name overhaul of May 2022.
Pont de Fusta	Line 4 (Metrovalencia)	1994	Tram	At-grade	
Quart de Poblet	Line 3 (Metrovalencia) Line 5 (Metrovalencia) Line 9 (Metrovalencia)	2007	Metro	Underground	
Quatre Carreres	Line 10 (Metrovalencia)	2022	Tram	At-grade	
**Rafelbunyol**	Line 3 (Metrovalencia)	1995	Suburban train	At-grade	
Realón	Line 1 (Metrovalencia)	1988	Suburban train	At-grade	
Reus	Line 4 (Metrovalencia)	1994	Tram	At-grade	
**Riba-roja de Túria**	Line 9 (Metrovalencia)	2015	Suburban train	At-grade	
Rocafort	Line 1 (Metrovalencia)	1988	Suburban train	At-grade	
Roses	Line 3 (Metrovalencia) Line 5 (Metrovalencia) Line 9 (Metrovalencia)	2007	Metro	Underground	Renamed from Rosas as part of the name overhaul of May 2022.
Russafa	Line 10 (Metrovalencia)	2022	Tram	Underground	
Safranar	Line 1 (Metrovalencia) Line 2 (Metrovalencia) Line 7 (Metrovalencia)	1988	Metro	Underground	Originally called Hospital; name changed in December 2011.
Sagunt	Line 4 (Metrovalencia)	1994	Tram	At-grade	
Salt de L'Aigua	Line 3 (Metrovalencia) Line 5 (Metrovalencia) Line 9 (Metrovalencia)	2007	Metro	Underground	
Sant Isidre	Line 1 (Metrovalencia) Line 2 (Metrovalencia) Line 7 (Metrovalencia)	1988	Metro	At-grade	
Sant Joan	Line 4 (Metrovalencia)	1999	Tram	At-grade	
Sant Miquel del Reis	Line 6 (Metrovalencia)	2007	Tram	At-grade	
Sant Ramon	Line 1 (Metrovalencia)	1988	Suburban train	At-grade	
Santa Rita	Line 2 (Metrovalencia)	1988	Suburban train	At-grade	
**Seminari-CEU**	Line 1 (Metrovalencia)	1988	Suburban train	At-grade	
**Tarongers-Ernest Lluch**	Line 4 (Metrovalencia) Line 6 (Metrovalencia)	1994	Tram	At-grade	Renamed in November 2021 on the 21st anniversary of the assassination of Ernest Lluch.
Tomás y Valiente	Line 4 (Metrovalencia)	2005	Tram	At-grade	
**Torrent**	Line 1 (Metrovalencia) Line 2 (Metrovalencia) Line 7 (Metrovalencia)	1988	Metro	At-grade	
**Torrent Avinguda**	Line 2 (Metrovalencia) Line 7 (Metrovalencia)	2004	Metro	Underground	
**Tossal del Rei**	Line 6 (Metrovalencia)	2007	Tram	At-grade	
Trànsits	Line 4 (Metrovalencia)	1994	Tram	At-grade	
Trinitat	Line 4 (Metrovalencia) Line 6 (Metrovalencia)	1994	Tram	At-grade	Renamed from Primat Reig as part of the name overhaul of May 2022.
Túria	Line 1 (Metrovalencia) Line 2 (Metrovalencia)	1988	Metro	Underground	
Universitat Politècnica	Line 4 (Metrovalencia) Line 6 (Metrovalencia)	1994	Tram	At-grade	
València Sud	Line 1 (Metrovalencia) Line 2 (Metrovalencia) Line 7 (Metrovalencia)	1988	Metro	At-grade	
València la Vella	Line 9 (Metrovalencia)	2018	Metro	At-grade	
**Vicent Andrés Estellés**	Line 4 (Metrovalencia)	1999	Tram	At-grade	
Vicent Zaragozá	Line 4 (Metrovalencia) Line 6 (Metrovalencia)	1994	Tram	At-grade	
Xàtiva	Line 3 (Metrovalencia) Line 5 (Metrovalencia) Line 9 (Metrovalencia)	1998	Metro	Underground	
