= Àngel Guimerà (Metrovalencia) =

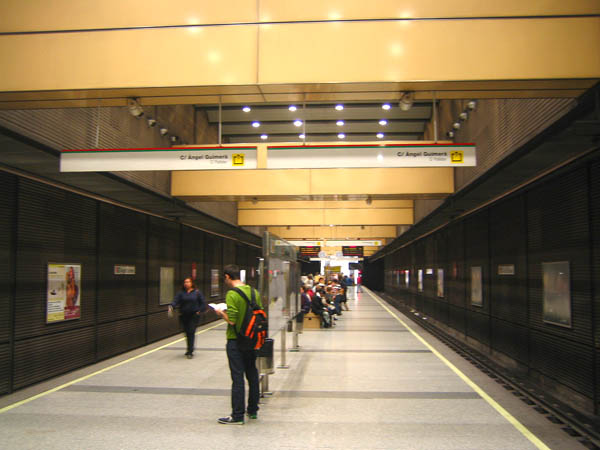
- Lines 3 and 5 station platforms

General information
- Location: Carrer d'Àngel Guimerà, Valencia; Spain
- Coordinates: 39.4703°N 0.3850°W

Construction
- Structure type: Underground

History
- Opened: 1988

Services
Preceding station	Metrovalencia	Following station
Túria towards Bétera	Line 1	Plaça d'Espanya towards Castelló
Túria towards Llíria	Line 2	Plaça d'Espanya towards Torrent Avinguda
Avinguda del Cid towards Aeroport	Line 3	Xàtiva towards Rafelbunyol
Avinguda del Cid towards Aeroport	Line 5	Xàtiva towards Marítim
Avinguda del Cid towards Riba-Roja de Túria	Line 9	Xàtiva towards Alboraia Peris Aragó
Location

Àngel Guimerà (Valencian: [ˈaɲdʒel ɣimeˈɾa]) is a metro station of the Metrovalencia network in Valencia, Spain. It is situated on Carrer d'Àngel Guimerà, named after the writer Àngel Guimerà, in the southwestern part of the city centre. The station is an underground structure. It was opened on 8 October 1988, along with seven other stations.
