= Colón (Metrovalencia) =

Metro station in Valencia, Spain

Colón (Spanish) Colom (Valencian)
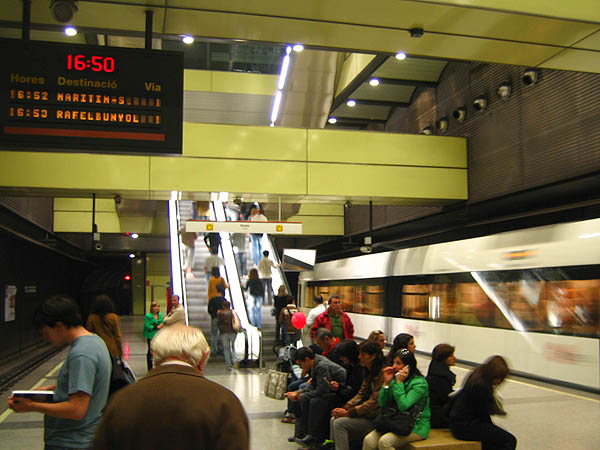
- Station platforms

General information
- Location: Carrer de Colom, Valencia; Spain
- Coordinates: 39.4701°N 0.3709°W

Construction
- Structure type: Underground
- Accessible: Yes

Other information
- Station code: 15
- Fare zone: A

History
- Opened: August 16, 1998; 28 years ago

Services
Preceding station	Metrovalencia	Following station
Xàtiva towards Aeroport	Line 3	Alameda towards Rafelbunyol
Xàtiva towards Aeroport	Line 5	Alameda towards Marítim
Bailén towards Torrent Avinguda	Line 7	Alameda towards Marítim
Xàtiva towards Riba-Roja de Túria	Line 9	Alameda towards Alboraia Peris Aragó
Location

Colón (Note: Spanish pronunciation: [koˈlon]) (Valencian: Colom, (Note: Valencian pronunciation: [koˈlom], [koˈlon]) mostly referred as Colón) is a metro station of the Metrovalencia network in Valencia, Spain. It is situated on Carrer de Colom, in the southeastern part of the city centre. The station is a tall underground structure with a single island platform serving all four lines.

== Station Layout ==
G	Street level	Exit/entrance
-1	Mezzanine, fare gates
-2; Platform level	Westbound	← toward Aeroport (Xàtiva) ← toward Riba-Roja de Túria (Xàtiva) ← toward Torrent Avinguda (Bailén)
-2; Platform level	Island platform
-2; Platform level	Eastbound	toward Rafelbunyol (Alameda) → toward Marítim (Alameda) → toward Alboraia Peris Aragó (Alameda) →
