= Xàtiva (Metrovalencia) =

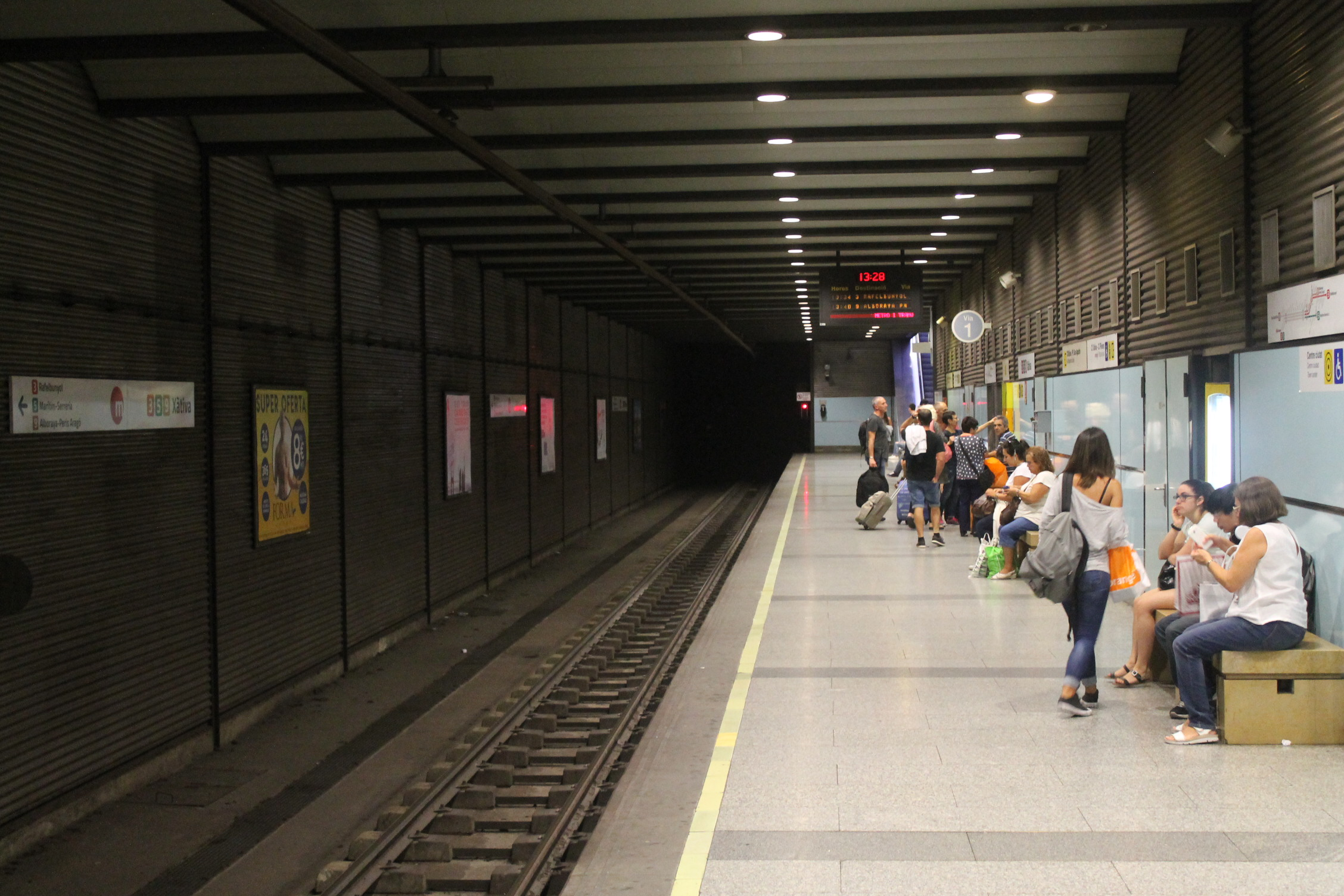
- One of the station platforms

General information
- Location: Carrer de Xàtiva, Valencia; Spain
- Coordinates: 39.4672°N 0.3774°W
- Tracks: 2

Construction
- Structure type: Underground
- Platform levels: 2

Other information
- Station code: 16
- Fare zone: A

History
- Opened: September 16, 1998; 27 years ago

Services
Preceding station	Metrovalencia	Following station
Àngel Guimerà towards Aeroport	Line 3	Colón towards Rafelbunyol
Àngel Guimerà towards Aeroport	Line 5	Colón towards Marítim
Àngel Guimerà towards Riba-Roja de Túria	Line 9	Colón towards Alboraia Peris Aragó
Location

Xàtiva (Note: Pronunciation of Xàtiva: Valencian: [ˈʃativa].) is a metro station of the Metrovalencia network in Valencia, Spain. It is situated on Carrer de Xàtiva, in the southern part of the city centre.

It is an interchange station between Lines 3, 5, and 7, with direct access to Valencia-Nord railway station. The underground metro station is bi-level due to its position directly west of a stacked grade-separated junction with Line 7 (toward Bailén). East of the station, all four lines merge to two tracks prior to Colón station.

A contract for the construction of a passageway between this station and Alacant station has been awarded. This proposed passageway would allow for a direct in-system transfer to Line 10.

== Station Layout ==
G	Street level	Exit/entrance
-1	Mezzanine, fare gates
-2; Platform level	Eastbound	toward Rafelbunyol (Colón) → toward Marítim (Colón) → toward Alboraia Peris Aragó (Colón) →
-2; Platform level	Side platform
-3; Platform level	Westbound	← toward Aeroport (Àngel Guimerà) ← toward Riba-Roja de Túria (Àngel Guimerà)
-3; Platform level	Side platform
