= 3600 series =

3600 series may refer to:

- JR Shikoku 3600 series hybrid diesel multiple unit on order by Shikoku Railway Company
- Keisei 3600 series Japanese electric multiple unit operating for Keisei Electric Railway
- UTE3600 series Spanish electric multiple unit formerly operating for Ferrocarrils de la Generalitat Valenciana
