= Jesús (Metrovalencia) =

Subway station in Valencia, Spain

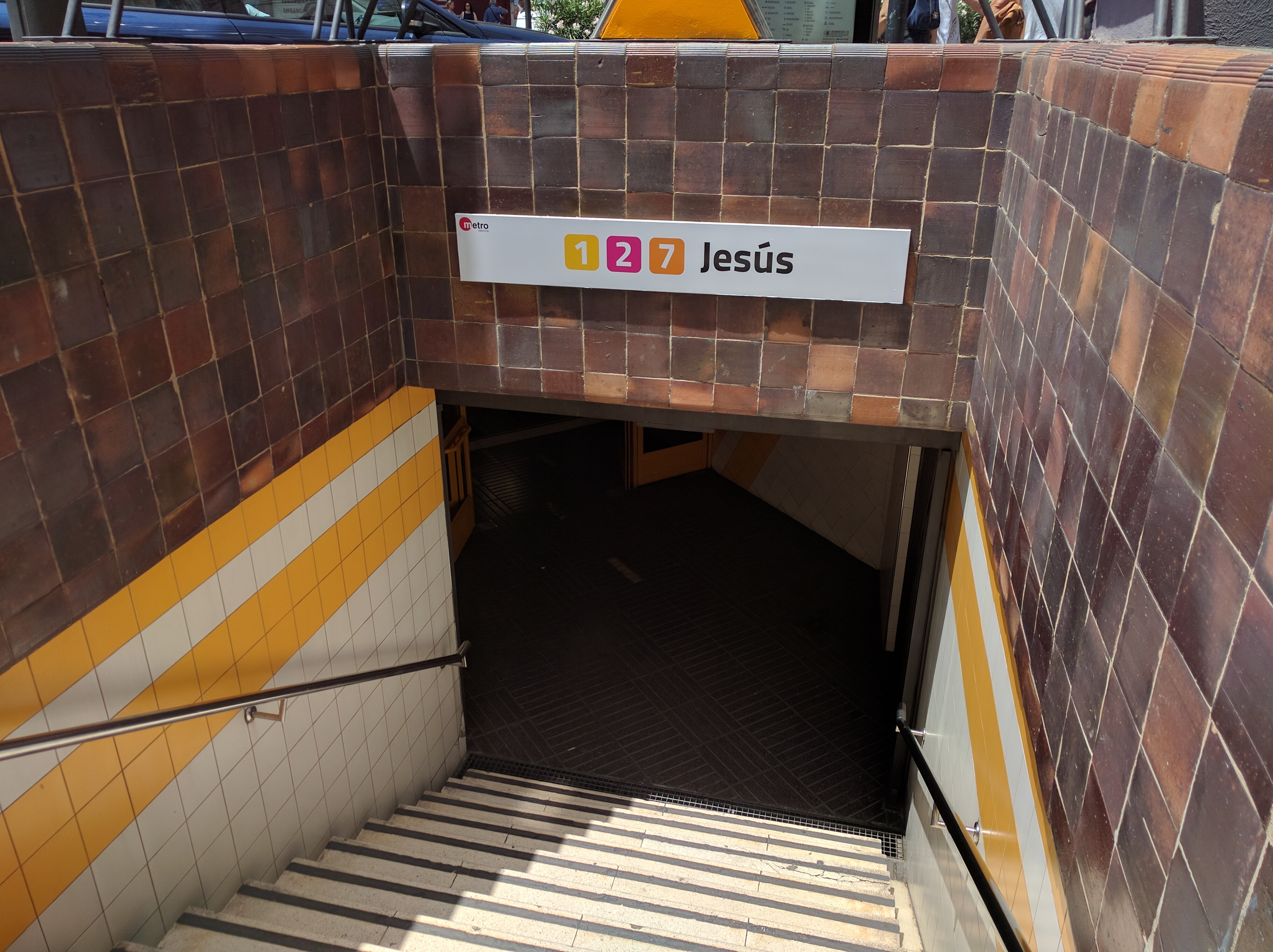
- Changing the station's name

General information
- Location: Valencia (La Raiosa); Spain
- Coordinates: 39.4595°N 0.3847°W
- Operator: FGV

Construction
- Structure type: Underground

History
- Opened: 1988

Services
Preceding station	Metrovalencia	Following station
Plaça Espanya towards Bétera	Line 1	Patraix towards Castelló
Plaça Espanya towards Llíria	Line 2	Patraix towards Torrent Avinguda
Bailén towards Torrent Avinguda	Line 7	Patraix towards Marítim
Location

Jesús (Valencian: [dʒeˈzus]) is a station in the Metrovalencia network in the La Raiosa area of Valencia. It is served by line 1, line 2 and line 7.

The station was opened on 8 October 1988, when Metrovalencia was created. On 3 July 2006, a serious crash, which killed 43 people, occurred between the station and Plaça d'Espanya station. On 12 December 2010, the station was renamed Joaquín Sorolla, after the painter and to reflect its proximity to the high speed train station Joaquín Sorolla which opened a week after the name change. The name change was opposed by opposition political parties and residents groups, who considered it an attempt to forget the tragedy. Groups representing victims of the crash also criticised the name change, pointing out that the Joaquín Sorolla name would be more appropriate for the 2 metro stations, Bailén and Xàtiva, which were closer to the high-speed station. They requested that the name be altered to Jesús-Joaquín Sorolla. In February 2012, Valencia city council unanimously adopted their suggestion, changing the name to Joaquín Sorolla-Jesús. On 30 June 2016, the station reverted to its original name to mark the tenth anniversary of the metro accident.
