= Metrovalencia =

Rapid transit system in Valencia, Spain

Overview
- Owner: FGV
- Locale: Valencia, Spain
- Transit type: Rapid transit, tram
- Number of lines: 10: 6 rapid transit lines (L1, L2, L3, L5, L7, L9); 4 tram lines (L4, L6, L8, L10)
- Number of stations: 146: 38 underground stations; 108 surface stations
- Daily ridership: 190,253 (avg. weekday, 2019)
- Annual ridership: 91.1 Million (2025)
- Chief executive: Anaís Menguzzato

Operation
- Began operation: 8 October 1988 (as FGV); 21 May 1994 (as Valencia Tram); 5 May 1995 (as MetroValencia)
- Number of vehicles: 106

Technical
- System length: 161.7 km (100.5 mi): 29.8 km (18.5 mi) underground; 131.3 km (81.6 mi) surface
- Track gauge: 1,000 mm (3 ft 3 3/8 in) metre gauge
- Electrification: 750 V DC; 1500 V DC, overhead wire
Map of Metrovalencia

Metrovalencia (Note: Pronunciation of Metrovalencia: Valencian: [ˌmetɾovaˈlensia] Spanish: [ˈmetɾoβaˈlenθja]) is an urban rail including rapid transit and trams, serving Valencia and its metropolitan area. The network is a modern amalgamation of former FEVE narrow gauge electric-operated suburban railways. It is a large suburban network that crosses the city of Valencia, with all trains continuing out to the suburbs. It also has destinations on lines that make it more closely resemble commuter trains. The unique system combines light railway, metro and several tram operations north of the Túria riverbed park with line 4. Trains of lines 1, 3, 5 and 9 have automatic train operation (ATO) in 25.3 kilometers of the underground system. Tram lines 4, 6, 8 and 10 are operated by modern trams.

This network consists of more than 161.7 km of route, of which 29.8 km is underground.

The system authority Ferrocarrils de la Generalitat Valenciana (FGV) uses bilingual signage in Valencian and Spanish.

== Operations ==
=== Lines ===
Line	Terminals	Year opened	Service type	Length	Stations	Passengers in 2018
Line 1 (Metrovalencia)	Bétera – Castelló	1988	Underground + Commuter train	72.145 km (44.829 mi)	40	9,808,295
Line 2 (Metrovalencia)	Llíria – Torrent Avinguda	1988^{†}	Underground + Commuter train	39.445 km (24.510 mi)	33	9,124,791
Line 3 (Metrovalencia)	Rafelbunyol – Aeroport	1995	Underground + Commuter train	24.691 km (15.342 mi)	27	14,147,324
	Mas del Rosari/Ll. Llarga/Fira – Dr. Lluch	1994	Tramway	16.999 km (10.563 mi)	33	6,644,251
Line 5 (Metrovalencia)	Marítim – Aeroport	2003	Underground	13.293 km (8.260 mi)	18	10,774,501
	Tossal del Rei – Marítim	2007	Tramway	3.571 km (2.219 mi)	21	2,112,300
	Marítim – Torrent Avinguda	2015^{†}	Underground	15.497 km (9.629 mi)	16	7,702,423
	Neptú – Marítim	2015^{†}	Tramway	1.230 km (0.764 mi)	4	433,213
	Alboraia-Peris Aragó – Riba-roja de Túria	2015^{†}	Underground + Commuter train	24.859 km (15.447 mi)	23	8,695,441
Line 10 (Metrovalencia)	Alacant – Natzaret	2022	Underground + Tramway	5.3 km (3.3 mi)	8	N/A

^{†} Notes: In 1998, Line 2 was combined with Line 1; it became a separate branch again in 2015. Lines 7 to 9 were created in 2015 by splitting existing branch lines, with the only new stations for these lines consisting of the extension from Manises to Riba-roja de Túria.

The network includes five unmanned stations: Rocafort, Fuente del Jarro, Massarojos, Fondo de Benaguasil and Font de l'Almaguer.

=== Technical data ===
- Gauge width: 1,000 mm (3 ft 3 3/8 in) metre gauge (narrow gauge)
- Current system: 750 V DC / 1500 V DC, overhead wire

=== Passenger numbers ===
In 2012, an estimated 63,103,814 passengers used the service, a decline of 2.8% from the 65,074,726 who had used it in 2011. The 2011 figures had shown a 5% decline compared to 2010. On average 172,887 passengers a day used the service in 2012 with the busiest day being 18 March, the final day of the Fallas festival, when 482,960 passengers used the service. The three most used stations on the network were all in the centre of Valencia: Xàtiva, beside Valencia's main train station, with 4,769,628 passengers in 2012, Colón, in one of Valencia's main shopping streets, with 4,189,736 passengers and Àngel Guimerà, an interchange station for lines 1,2,3,5 and 9 situated beside Valencia old town, with 2,461,012 users. The fourth and fifth busiest stations were Túria, next to Valencia's main bus station, with 2,035,521 and Facultats, serving the University of Valencia, with 1,951,080 users. The remaining stations in the top eight were Plaça de Espanya (1,807,538 passengers), Amistat (1,552,281) and Mislata (1,505,106). The first two of these were located in areas near Valencia centre, while Mislata was the main station for the satellite town of the same name.

In 2014, the system carried 60,111,000 passengers.

In 2015, 60,686,589 passengers used the network, reversing a decline which had occurred in previous years. Seventeen stations reported more than 1 million users in that year.

In 2019, patronage reached an all-time high of over 69 million. The ten busiest stations were Xàtiva with 5,459,784 passengers, Colón (4,520,931); Àngel Guimerà (3,067,957); Túria (2,044,393); Plaça d'Espanya (2,035,060); Facultats (1,951,546); Benimaclet (1,837,812); Amistat (1,817,120); Mislata (1,708,658); Avinguda del Cid (1,598,112).

In 2022, the system carried 63,361,626 passengers.

== History ==
The Metrovalencia network traces its origins to the Trenet de València (ca; es) system of narrow-gauge interurban railways, of which its first section, built by the Valencian Tramway Society (es:Sociedad Valenciana de Tranvías) was opened in 1888 between Valencia (near the Pont de Fusta, or Fusta Bridge) and Llíria. Several further extensions of the Trenet were later built between 1891 and 1912. In 1917, both the Valencian Tramway Corporation and the Compagnie Génerale des Tramways de Valence (Espagne) Société Lyonnaise (es) were merged into a single company called the Valencia Tram and Rail Company (es:Compañía de Tranvías y Ferrocarriles de Valencia). After years of losses, the rail operations of CTFV were finally acquired by FEVE in 1964.

=== First four lines ===
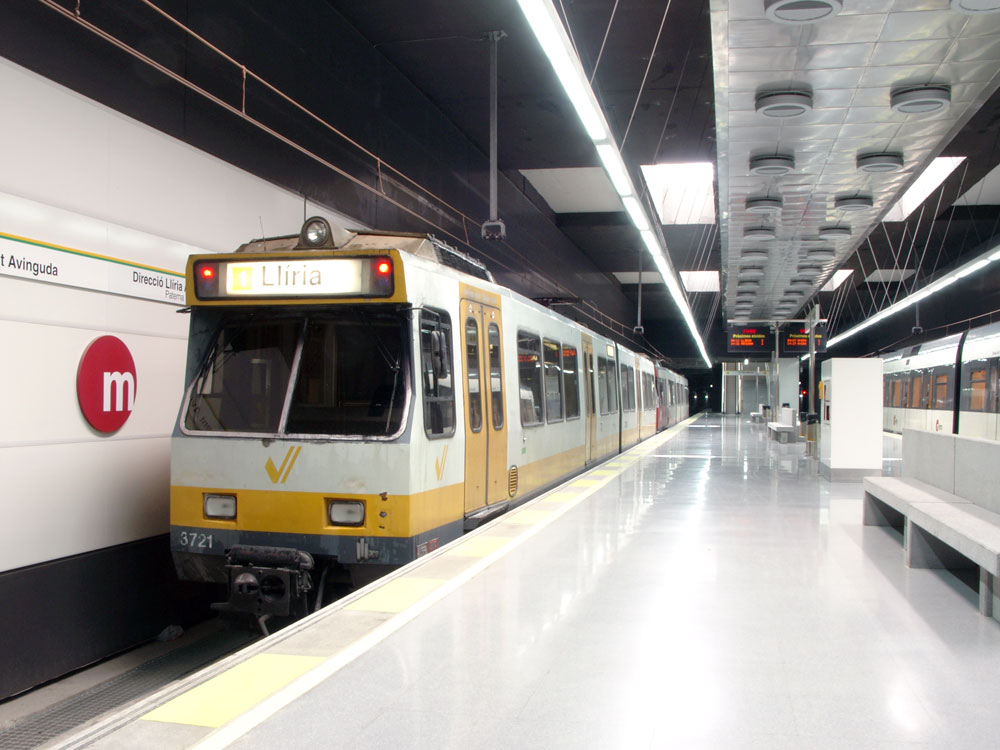
Lines 1 and 5 at Torrent Avinguda Station. Differences between the old line (1) and the new line (5) can be seen in this picture

On 8 October 1988, the tunnel through which Line 1 crosses Valencia was opened between Sant Isidre and Empalme (at the time called Ademuz), allowing through-running via València-Jesús to Castelló de la Ribera. Line 2 went from València-Sud to Llíria, with some trains terminating in Paterna. The opening was marked by a ceremony in Plaça Espanya station attended by Transport Minister José Barrionuevo and Valencian President Joan Lerma.

In May 1994, the first tranvia in the system, Line 4, opened. Valencia was the first city in Spain to use this mode of transport in the modern era as trams had been withdrawn from Valencia in the 1970s and replaced by buses. Initially, the line was 9.7 kilometres (6.0 mi) long and had 21 stations. The line connected the suburban lines with high demand zones such as the Polytechnic University, the new university campus, and the Malvarrosa Beach, replacing the former line from Empalme to El Grau.

In May 1995, Line 3 was created via a new tunnel from El Palmaret in Alboraria to Alameda. The extension reused an existing railway line from Pont de Fusta to Rafelbunyol, of which part was scrapped (Pont de Fusta – Sant Llorenç – El Palmaret). The remainder was switched from 750 V to 1500 V.

Further alterations followed five years later. On 16 September 1998, Line 2 was merged with Line 1, and Line 3 was extended from Alameda to Avinguda del Cid in the west with a branch to Torrent in the south (with some trains only going as far as Jesús). Then, in May 1999, Line 3 was extended again from Avinguda del Cid to Mislata-Almassil.

=== Lines 5 and 6, and more extensions ===
Metrovalencia Line 5

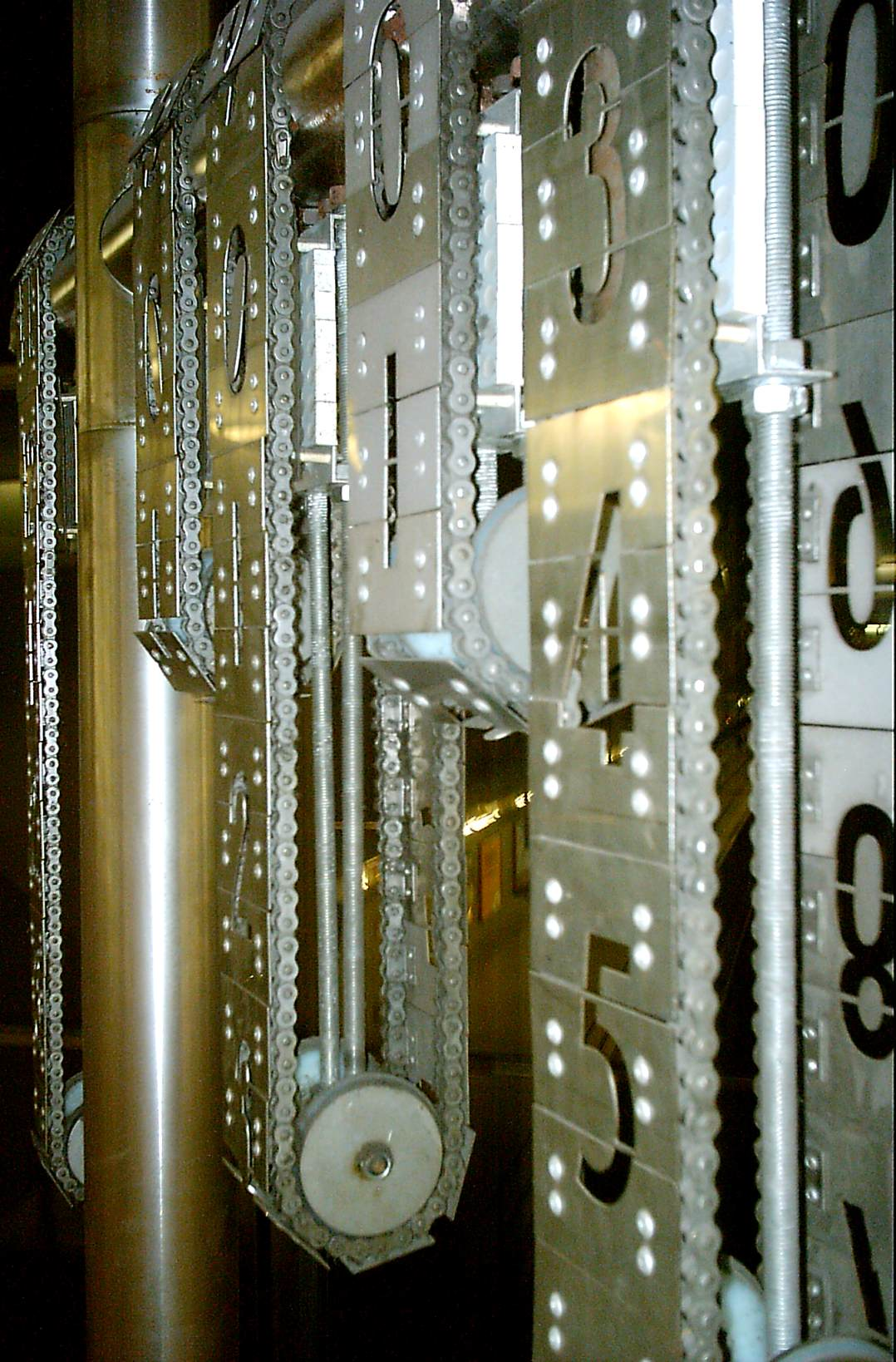
Many stations have an artistic exhibit in the entrance hall. This one is in Benimaclet.

In April 2003, Line 5 was opened, taking over the Torrent branch of Line 3 together with a newly constructed 2.3-kilometre (1.4 mi) branch from Alameda to Ayora. (Although some very early morning trains still travel from Machado to Torrent, this is not represented on maps.) One year later, Lines 1 and 5 were extended from Torrent to Torrent Avinguda, a distance of 2.3 kilometres (1.4 mi).

On 3 October 2005, an infill station between Colón and Jesús was opened on Line 5 with a connection to València-Nord. Additionally, Line 4 was extended to Mas del Rosari, and on 20 December to Lloma Llarga-Terramelar.

On 2 April 2007, Line 5 was extended eastward to Marítim (originally planned to be called Jerónimo Monsoriu). This station allows transfers to a tram operating to the port at Neptú station (opening two weeks later on the 18th), which was originally listed only as an extension of Line 5. Simultaneously, Line 5 was extended west with Line 3 to a new station at the Valencia Airport.

On 22 September 2007, Line 6 was opened, linking the neighborhoods of Orriols and Torrefiel to the metro system for the first time. Additionally a new infill station, Torre del Virrei, was added to Line 1, between L'Eliana and La Pobla de Vallbona.

On 12 December 2010, two overground stations on Lines 3, Alboraya and Palmaret, were replaced by new subterranean stations: Alboraia Peris Aragó and Alboraia – Palmaret, respectively. Additionally, on Line 1, Jesús was renamed Joaquin Sorolla, while the Hospital station was renamed Safranar.

On 6 March 2015, a 4-station spur from Rosas to Riba-roja de Túria was opened as Line 9. This followed the path of a regional train line, which had been closed in 2005.

In April 2015, the metro map was redrawn with several of the branches split into separate lines, increasing the number of lines to 9.

On 1 February 2022, the number of fare zones was reduced from four to two, as part of a reduction in ticket prices, with a supplemental fare applying to Aeroport station. Additionally, the names of 21 stations were changed to make the names more readily identifiable, to adapt them to the urban changes in their areas, and to promote "linguistic normalisation" (favouring Valencian language names rather than Spanish language ones.) The changes took effect alongside other changes made in preparation for the opening of the new tram Line 10, which opened for service on 17 May 2022.

=== Accidents and incidents ===
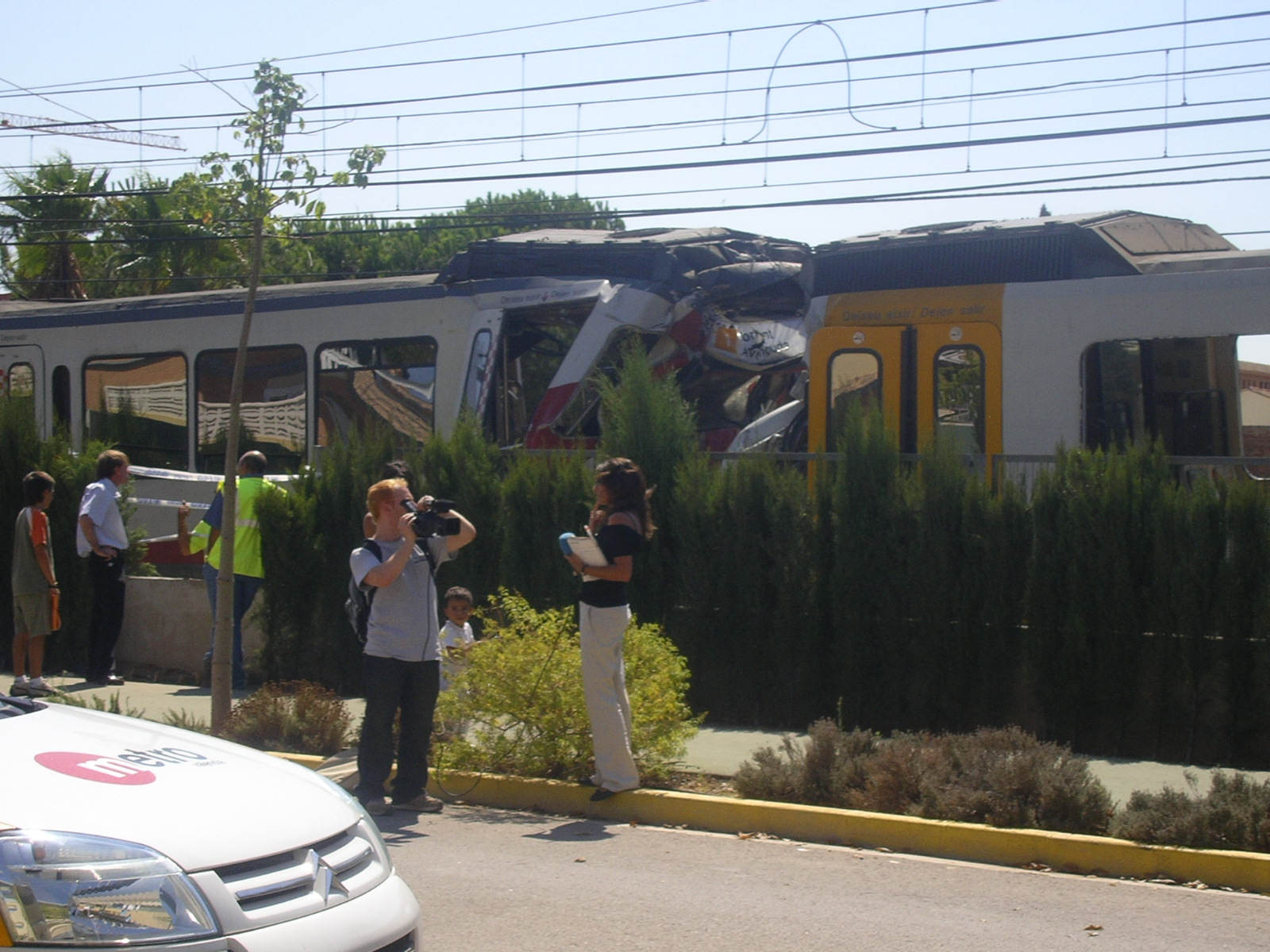
Accident occurred on 9 September 2005

Between 2002 and the first quarter of 2012, 83 accidents had occurred on the network, costing the lives of 56 people.

On 9 September 2005, two trains crashed into each other on Line 1. Nobody was killed, but according to early reports 35 people were injured, 4 of whom were taken to hospital, their condition described as serious. The first train had been stationary waiting for a red signal. The second used its emergency brakes to avoid a collision, but was hit by a third train. The force of the impact severely damaged the drivers' cabs at the front of the last train and at the rear of the second train. The crash occurred between Paiporta and Picanya about 5 kilometres (3.1 mi) south-east of the city centre. The 3729 and 3730 EMUs are now a single EMU with 3729A and the 3730A cars, the 'B' cars were severely damaged and are currently at València-Sud workshop, waiting to be scrapped.

The date 3 July 2006 was a dark day for the Valencia metro. In a severe accident, a two-car EMU derailed between Jesús and Plaça d'Espanya stations. At least 43 people were killed and 47 injured. It was the worst metro accident in Spanish history.

The system was severely damaged by the floods on 29 October 2024, with the lines south of the city particularly badly affected, halting service. The tram lines 4, 6 and 8 resumed service on 9 November 2024, with a bus replacement service covering the route of the other lines. Lines 3, 5 and 9 were restored to full service on 3 December 2024, with lines 1 and 2 restored from the northern terminus to Plaça d'Espanya and Line 7 from the northern terminus to Sant Isidre.

== Future service ==
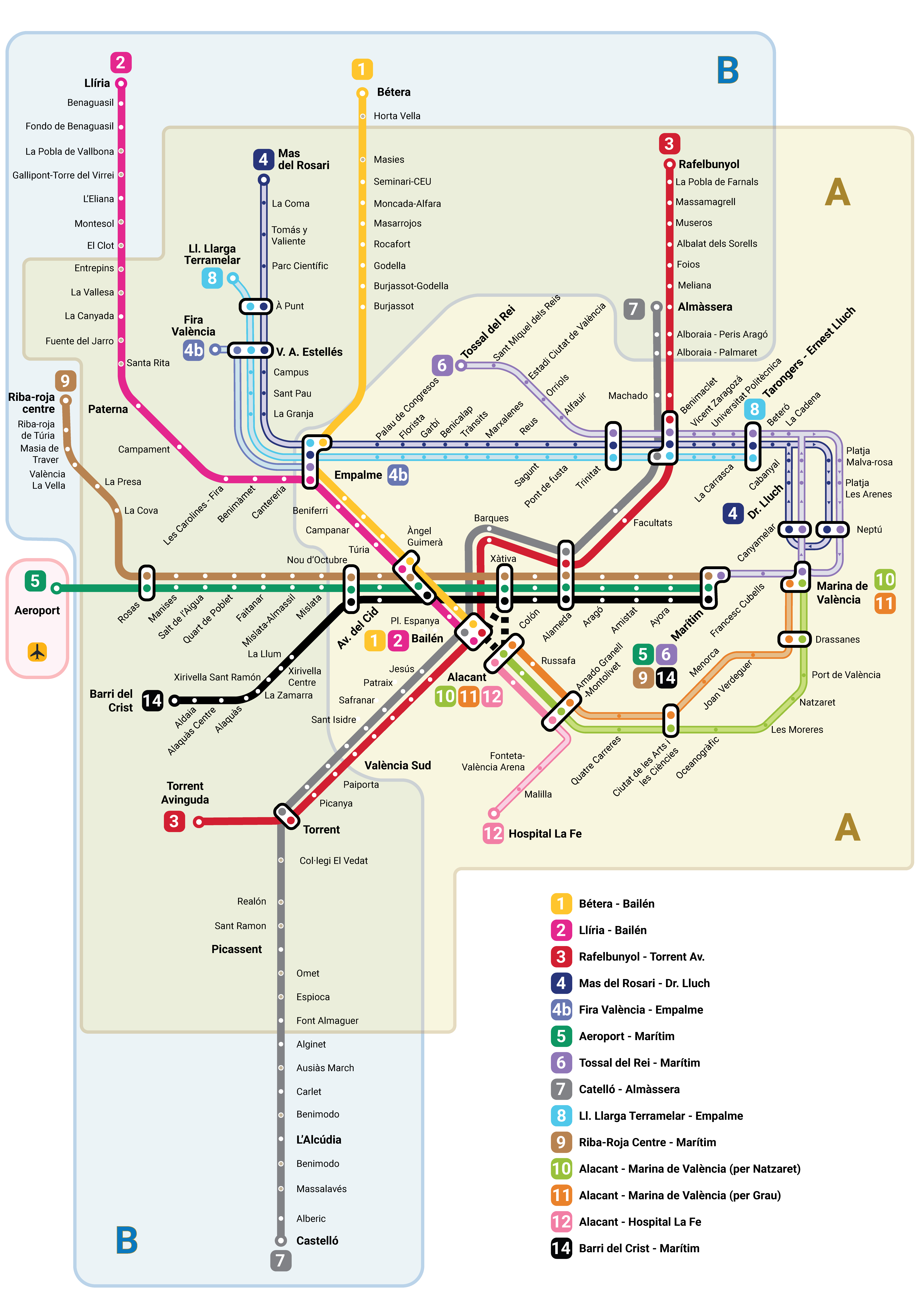
Metrovalencia map with proposed expansions

Line 9 is planned to be extended to the centre of Riba-roja de Túria. A tunnel will be built between Bailén and Alameda stations, with a new station near Valencia city hall, in order to improve service frequency. Line 10 will be extended north from the Natzaret terminus to Valencia's marina and Malvarosa beach. Three more lines are planned. Of those, Line 12 will use part of the track of line 10 and add 4 new stations.

Line	Terminals	Service type	Comments
	Alacant – Marina Real	Underground + Tramway	Under construction.
12	Alacant – Hospital La Fe	Underground + Tramway	Under construction.
14	Barri del Crist – Maritím	Underground + Regional train	Planned for 2027. Will create 8 stations in Valencia's La Llum district, and the towns of Xirivella, Alaquàs, Aldaia and Quart de Poblet's Barri del Crist.

== Postponed and cancelled extensions ==
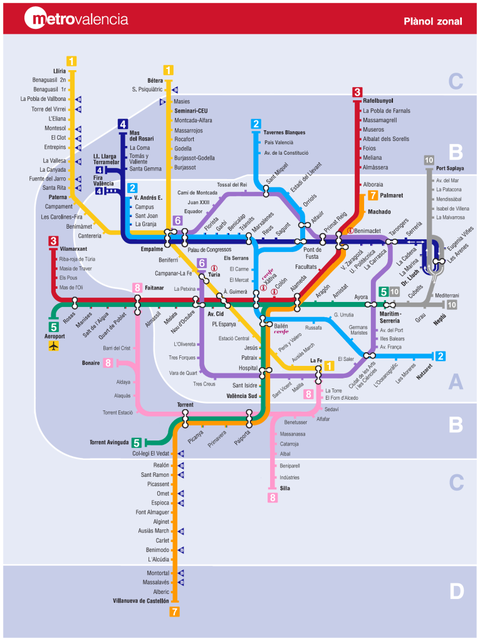
Map showing expansions planned in 2006

In 2006, the Generalitat Valenciana proposed a number of new lines and extensions which were abandoned due to lack of funds after the 2008 financial crisis.

=== Extension from Alacant to Tavernes Blanques ===
Line 10 was originally planned to have run underground through Ciutat Vella (Valencia's historic centre) before emerging at surface level at Pont de Fusta station and continuing to Tavernes Blanques. One station on this line, Mercat Central, began construction in 2007 and was completed at a cost of 27 million euros, but remains a ghost station. In March 2021, the director of Valencian railways said that the project had been abandoned and that a decision would be taken on how to use the completed station. In 2023 the Valencia regional government began feasibility studies in connecting the disused station with the rest of the network through a new tunnel. Also at the end of 2023, after winning the 2023 Valencian regional election on a programme which included completing Line 10, the People's Party of the Valencian Community began considering various options for northern extensions, including the original idea to Tavernes Blanques or alternative routes to Empalme station. In February 2025 the regional government announced a tender process for the preparation of preliminary studies for a northern Line 10 extension. Interested parties would have to submit a route plan serving the Orriols and Torrefiel neighbourhoods and linking to Empalme.

=== Extension to Vilamarxant ===
Plans were made for an extension of Line 9 to Vilamarxant. However, by 2015, the plans had been abandoned.

=== Orbital line ===
This would have been a tram line connecting Valencia's north and south boulevards with the towns of Alboraya, Mislata and Xirivella. It would have brought metro service to Valencia's Tres Forques, L'Olivereta and Malilla districts. Only a small part of the line was constructed through Valencia's Torrefiel and Orriols districts and opened as part of the new Line 6 in September 2007.

=== Horta Sud light metro ===
This line, initially designated as line 8, would have begun at La Fe. It would have run through Valencia's district of La Torre and the towns of Sedaví, Alfafar and Benetússer before dividing into two. The southern branch would have gone through Massanassa, Catarroja, Albal, Beniparrell before terminating in Silla. The western branch was to run through Paiporta, Torrent, Alaquàs and Aldaia. It would then have split into 2 further branches. One would have terminated at Bonaire shopping centre with the other continuing through Quart de Poblet to the terminus at Faitanar.

=== Coastal tram ===
The coastal tram (es), originally designated as Line 10, would have connected Alboraya's Port Saplaya and Patacona beach with Valencia's Malvarosa and Las Arenas beaches before terminating at Marítim station.

== See also ==
- List of metro systems
- Light metro
