= Line 2 (Metrovalencia) =

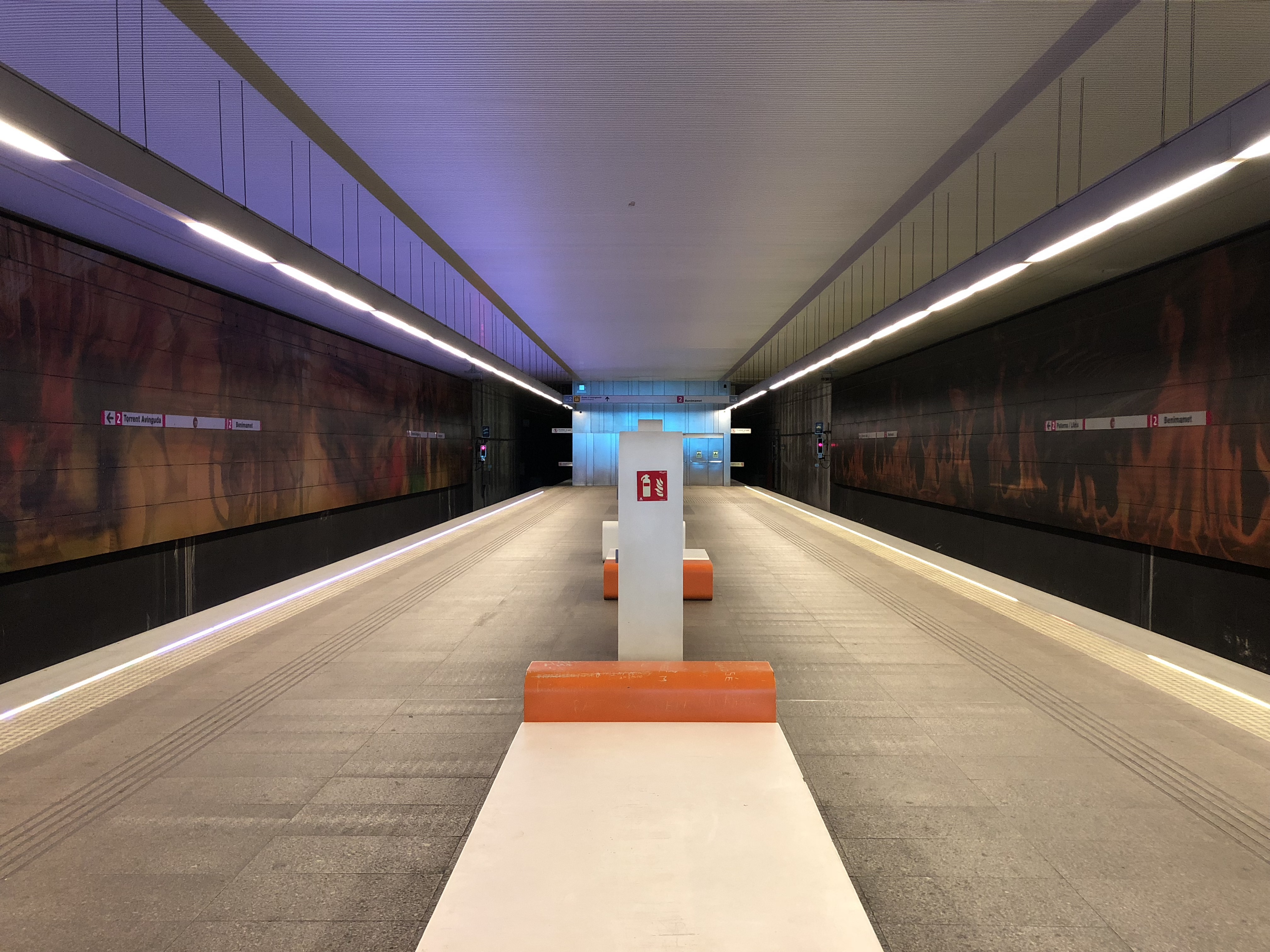
- Benimàmet station, September 2018.

Overview
- Status: Active
- Owner: Generalitat Valenciana
- Locale: Valencia, Spain
- Termini: Llíria; Torrent Avinguda
- Stations: 33
- Color on map: Pink

Service
- Type: Urban rail
- System: Metrovalencia
- Route number: 2
- Operator(s): FGV
- Ridership: 5,251,071 (2020)

History
- Opened: 1988

Technical
- Line length: 39.445 km (24.51 mi)
- Track gauge: 1,000 mm (3 ft 3 3/8 in) metre gauge
- Operating speed: 80 km/h (50 mph)

Line 2 of Metrovalencia opened on March 6, 2015 in the city of Valencia, Spain. The line, which featured no new stations, was created as part of a restructuring of public transport in the city. It replaced the branch of Line 1 which ran from Llíria to Torrent.

== History ==
The original line 2 of Metrovalencia was opened with the rest of the network in 1988 and ran from Llíria to Villanueva de Castellón. On 16 September 1999, line 2 ceased to exist when it was merged into line 1.

In the 2000s, a new line 2 was planned, to run from Tavernes Blanques to Valencia's Natzaret district. After years of delays, it opened in May 2022 as line 10. The line 2 designation is now used for existing branches of the network. The frequency of trains on these branches will remain unchanged.
