= Bailén (Metrovalencia) =

Railway station in Valencia, Spain

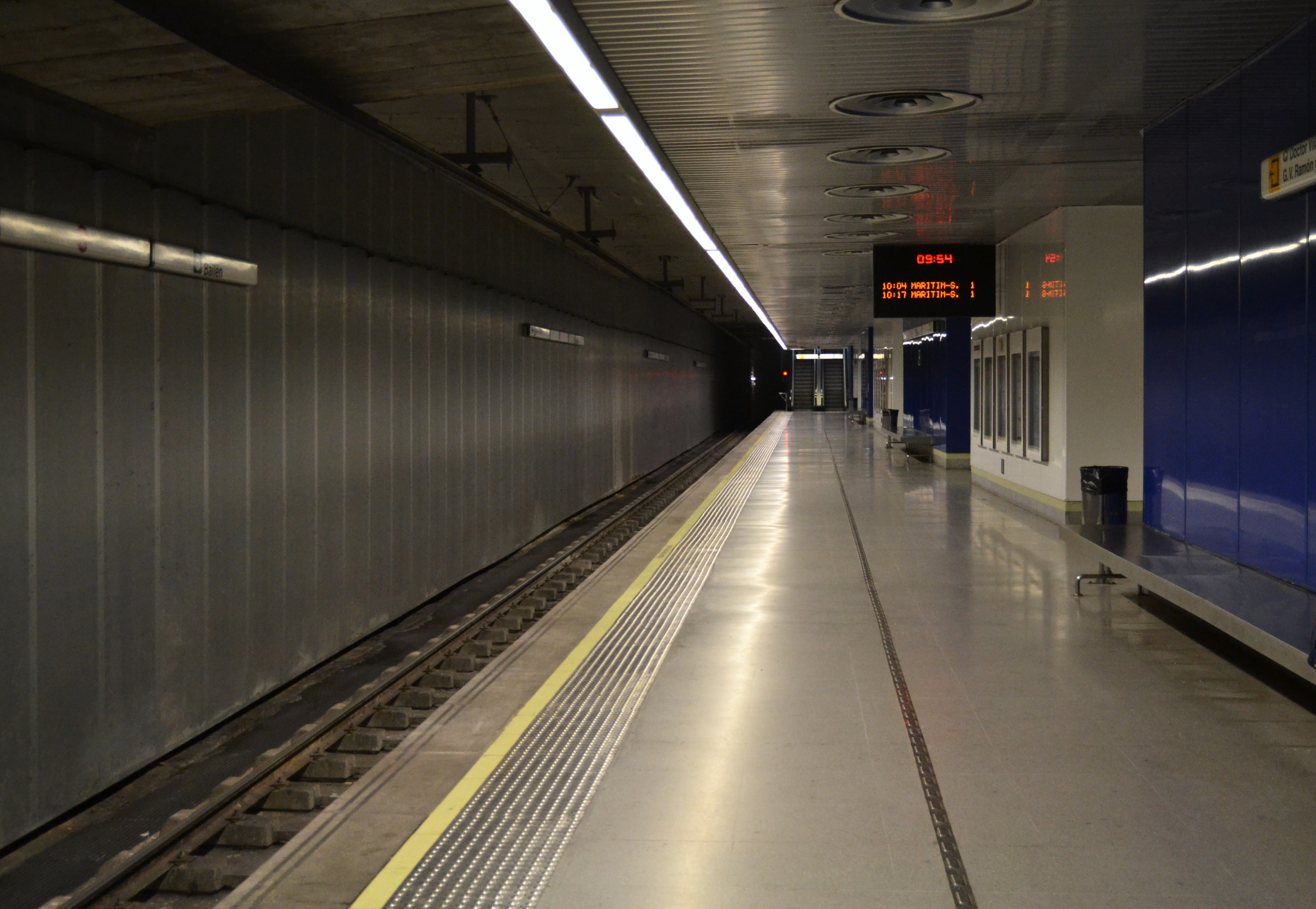
- Station platforms

General information
- Location: Carrer de Bailén, Valencia; Spain
- Coordinates: 39.4640°N 0.3794°W

Construction
- Structure type: Underground

Other information
- Station code: 109
- Fare zone: A

History
- Opened: October 3, 2005; 20 years ago

Services
Preceding station	Metrovalencia	Following station
Jesús towards Torrent Avinguda	Line 7	Colón towards Marítim
Location

Bailén (Valencian: [bajˈlen]) is a metro station of the Metrovalencia network in Valencia, Spain, in the southern part of the city centre. It is situated on Carrer de Bailén, north of the Gran Vía de Ramón y Cajal, directly southwest of Estació del Nord. The station is an underground structure with a single island platform.

While no in-system transfer exists between the two stations, a passageway outside of the paid area connects this station to Alacant station, allowing free transfers to Line 10.

== Station Layout ==
G	Street level	Exit/entrance
-1	Mezzanine, fare gates	Passageway to Alacant
-2; Platform level	Northbound	← toward Marítim (Colón)
-2; Platform level	Island platform
-2; Platform level	Southbound	toward Torrent Avinguda (Jesús) →	-

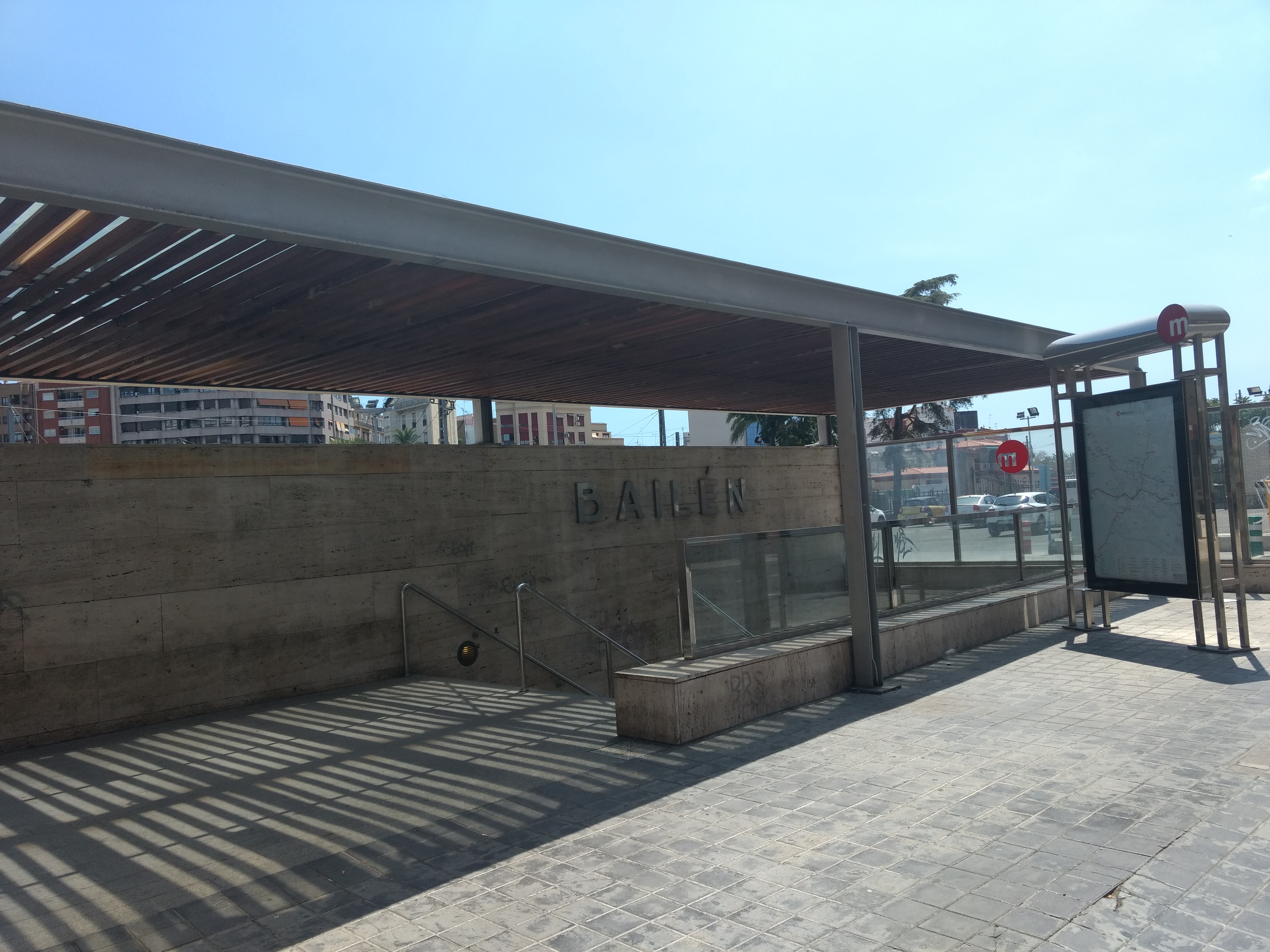
The entrance to the Bailén station.
