= Line 10 (Metrovalencia) =

Light rail line in Valencia, Spain

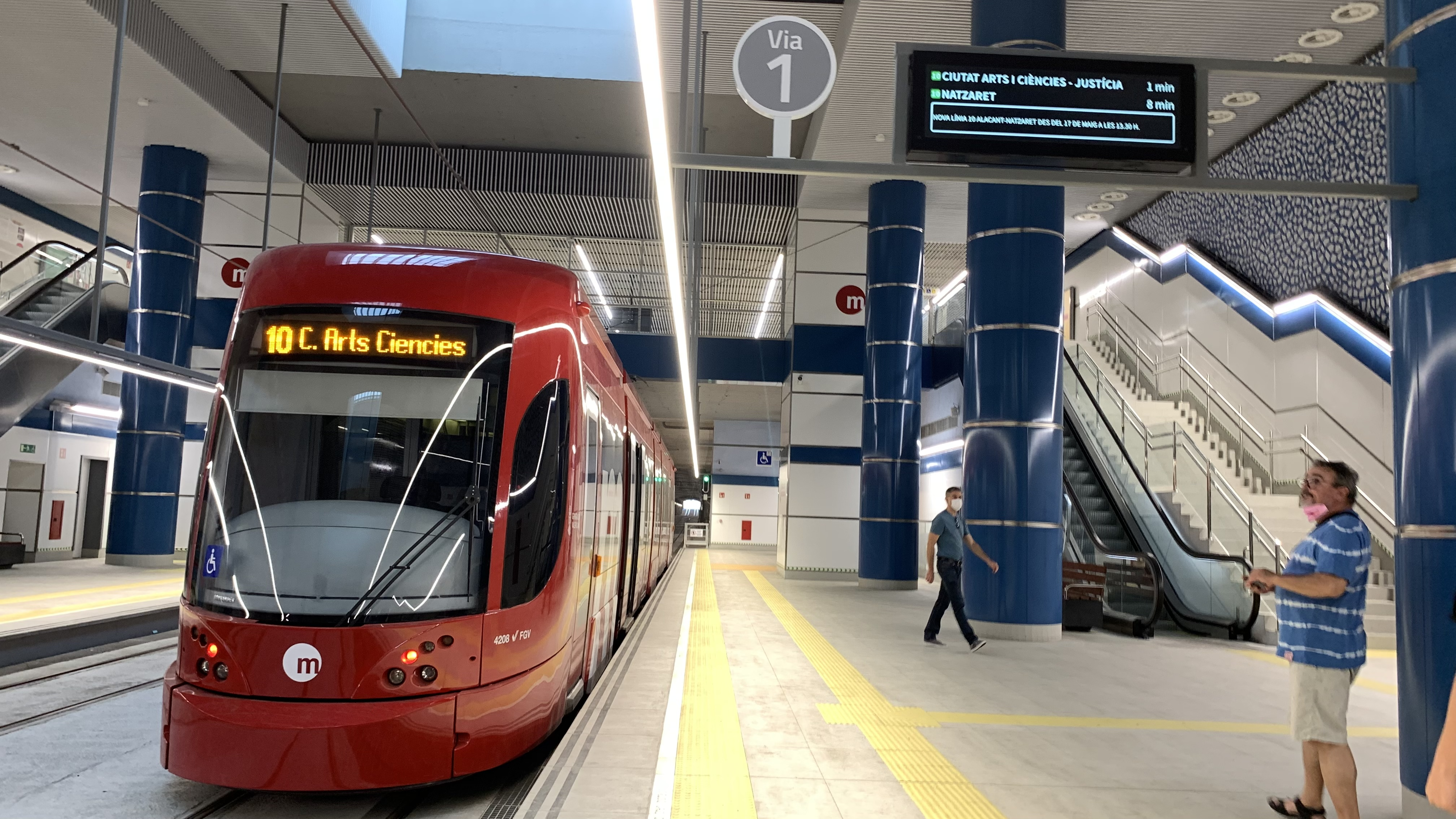
- An FGV 4200 Series Tram at Amado Granell-Montolivet station

Overview
- Status: Opened
- Owner: Generalitat Valenciana
- Locale: Valencia, Spain
- Termini: Alacant; Natzaret
- Stations: 8
- Color on map: Light green

Service
- Type: Tram
- System: Metrovalencia
- Route number: 10
- Operator(s): FGV

History
- Opened: 17 May 2022

Technical
- Track gauge: 1,000 mm (3 ft 3 3/8 in) metre gauge
- Operating speed: 80 km/h (50 mph)

Line 10 is a tram line which forms part of Metrovalencia in the city of Valencia, Spain. It opened on 17 May 2022. From 2007 until 2014, the line was designated as line 2. However, in November 2014, this designation was given to a branch of the existing Line 1, effective from April 2015. The line was then referred to as 'T2' until 1 March 2018 when it was decided to name it Line 10, to avoid confusion with existing metro lines.

The first sections of the line had been built by 2007, with the part north of the city centre used by Line 6. A lack of available funds as a result of the Spanish economic crisis led to work being halted on the remaining sections. In June 2017, work resumed, with funding from the European Union and regional government used to complete the southern half of the line. The central and northern parts of the line were suspended until 2023 when the new regional government announced plans to revive the project.

== Route ==
The route originally planned included a section between Xàtiva and Tavernes Blanques which has been suspended indefinitely. The suspended section was to pass through the district of Orriols, following the current Line 6 as far as Alfauir station, entering the north-south tunnel at Pont de Fusta. Underground stops were planned in Valencia's old town at the Serrano Towers (under the old riverbed), Carme and the central market (Mercat station) before reaching the current main train station at Xàtiva.

The completed route begins at the future central station. It continues underground along Avenida del Regne de València, turning right into Luís de Santángel and Amado Granell with an underground station at Germans Maristes, reaching the surface again near the crossroads of Amado Granell/Avenida de la Plata. From there it runs on the surface to the City of Arts and Sciences, and the Natzaret neighbourhood.

== History ==
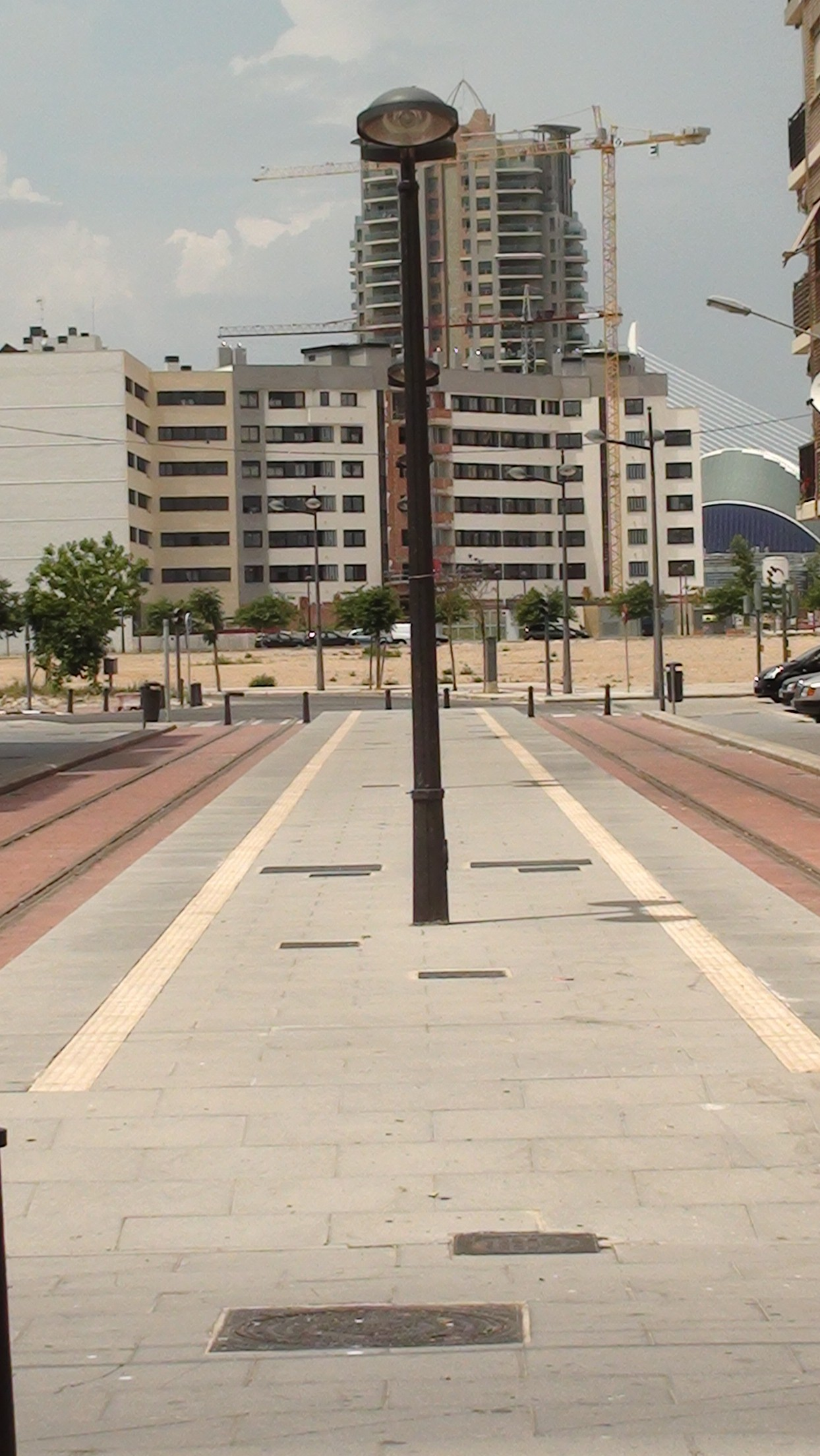
The completed Natzaret tram stop, the terminus of the line.

Construction began in January 2007 and the first sections of the line north of the city centre were completed later that year and put into use as part of Line 6 on 28 September 2007. The remaining sections were intended to be completed by 2010. However, work was eventually halted as funding ran out. In an interview in December 2011, Isabel Bonig, the regional minister responsible, stated that completion would be impossible without external help, for example from the central government. The cost of completing the remaining sections was estimated at 160 million euros.

As of May 2012, 5.2 kilometres of the southern route had been completed between Natzaret and Calle Alicante, near the main train station. This included a 2.3 km underground section. However, a half kilometre of overground track in this section had not yet been completed, including the Germans Maristes station. Between Calle Alicante and the Serranos Towers, only the Mercat station had been completed in the old town.

In May 2012, accidents suffered by pedestrians on the metro bridge over the railway line near the district of Natzaret and flooding of the tunnel already completed on Avenida Regne de València forced the Council of infrastructure to ask for tenders for the maintenance, inspection and cleaning of the sections already completed. The cost of this for six months was estimated to be 264,359 euros plus VAT. In November 2012, Bonig admitted that it was doubtful that Line 2 would be completed in 2013 as the required funds were not yet available. In January 2014, she said that completion of the line was a financial impossibility before the Valencian regional elections scheduled to be held by May 2015.

In July 2015, it was estimated that 190 million euros would be required to complete the line. The cost of maintaining the sections already built was 400,000 euros per year.

As of October 2015, spending on the line totalled 195 million euro. 51 million had been spent on the Mercat station with the rest on the tram line between the proposed Natzaret station and Calle Alicante. In that month, the regional government began removing the rails which had been installed on the surface to avoid traffic accidents. To complete the Natzaret to Calle Alicante section, 100 million euro was needed as of August 2015.

On 11 June 2017, Valencian regional president Ximo Puig announced that work on the southern half of the line between Natzaret and Xàtiva would resume. The regional government will provide €30 million of funding, with another €20 million of funds coming from the European Union. Only one station on the northern half of the line, Mercat Central, was completed at a cost of 27 million euros, but remains a ghost station. In March 2021, the director of Valencian railways said that the sections north of Alacant station had been abandoned and that a decision would be taken on how to use the Mercat Central station. This left Line 10 unconnected with the rest of the network. To improve accessibility, the regional government announced that a foot tunnel would be built between Xàtiva and Alacant stations, predicted to open in early 2024.

The 2023 regional election resulted in a change of government. The new People's Party-led government announced its intent to complete the northern parts of the line. The newly planned route is to connect with the unused Mercat Central station before linking up with the existing station of Pont de Fusta and passing through the districts of Orriols, Torrefiel, Benicalap and Ciutat Fallera before terminating at Empalme Station.

== Passenger numbers ==
In the first year of operations 1.7 million people used the line. Alacant station was used by 488,204 passengers, Ciutat Arts i Ciències-Justícia by 299,898, Quatre Carreres by 262,038; Natzaret by 202,658, Amado Granell-Montolivet by 182,791, Russafa by 142,082, Oceanogràfic by 60,887, and Moreres by 46,147 passengers.
