= Valencia Metro derailment =

Train wreck

Details
- Date: 3 July 2006; 13:03
- Location: Valencia, Valencian Community
- Coordinates: 39.4613°N 0.3826°W
- Country: Spain
- Line: Line 1
- Operator: Ferrocarrils de la Generalitat Valenciana
- Incident type: Derailment
- Cause: Overspeed at the curve

Statistics
- Deaths: 43
- Injured: 47

The Valencia Metro derailment occurred in Valencia, Spain's third largest city, on 3 July 2006 at 1 p.m. CEST (11:00 UTC) between Jesús and Plaça d'Espanya stations on the Line 1 of the Metrovalencia mass transit system. At least 43 people were killed and more than ten were seriously injured.

Valencian forensic scientists identified all but one of the victims—a woman whose family has not claimed her, according to El País. Twenty-one of the victims were from Torrent, a locality seven kilometres from Valencia and the train's destination. Five more victims were from the city of Valencia itself, and two were from Paiporta, which is also nearby.

== Incident ==
It was not immediately clear what caused the crash, which occurred at a curve just outside Jesús station. However, data from the train's black box showed that the train's speed at the derailment point was 80 kilometres per hour (50 mph), which means it was travelling at twice the normal 40 km/h (25 mph) speed for this curve.

Defective wheels or the possible collapse of a tunnel wall were also considered as possible causes. Both the Valencian government spokesman Vicente Rambla and Mayor Rita Barberá had called the accident a "chance" event. However, the trade union CC.OO. has accused the authorities of "rushing" to say anything but admit that Line 1 is in a state of "constant deterioration" with a "failure to carry out maintenance".

It has been reported that a part of the wall in the tunnel between Plaça d'Espanya and Jesús stations in the southwestern neighbourhood of Patraix may have collapsed, causing the derailment of one of the carriages, which in turn caused the carriage behind it to overturn.

The fire brigade, medics and local police went to the scene after a passenger in the crashed train called the emergency services at about 1:03 p.m. (11:03 UTC).

The incident came days before Pope Benedict XVI was due to visit Valencia for the World Meeting of the Families, attended by one million pilgrims. It also coincided with the end to one of the pre-America's Cup 2007 match racings. Both events led to an increase in tourists in the area. The Pope offered his condolences and prayed at Jesús station, the scene of the accident.

== Subsequent reactions ==
Years after the crash, several news media published information that reopened the debate about it. In June 2011, the magazine Interviú published that the train driver, who died in the accident and who received all the blame, was ill with epilepsy, which disqualified him for his work. In March 2012, the newspaper El Mundo published a story according to which FGV have instructed employees who were to testify at the crash commission investigation, providing a set of possible questions and guidelines to respond questions.

In April 2013, the TV program Salvados questioned the official version of the incident as there were indications that the Valencian Government had tried to downplay the accident, which coincided with the visit of the pope to Valencia, or even to hide evidence, as the book of train breakdowns was never found. The day after the broadcast of this report, which received extensive media coverage, several voices called for the reopening of the investigation.

== See also ==
- Valencia Metro
- List of rail accidents (2000–2009)
- List of Spanish rail accidents
