= Line 5 (Metrovalencia) =

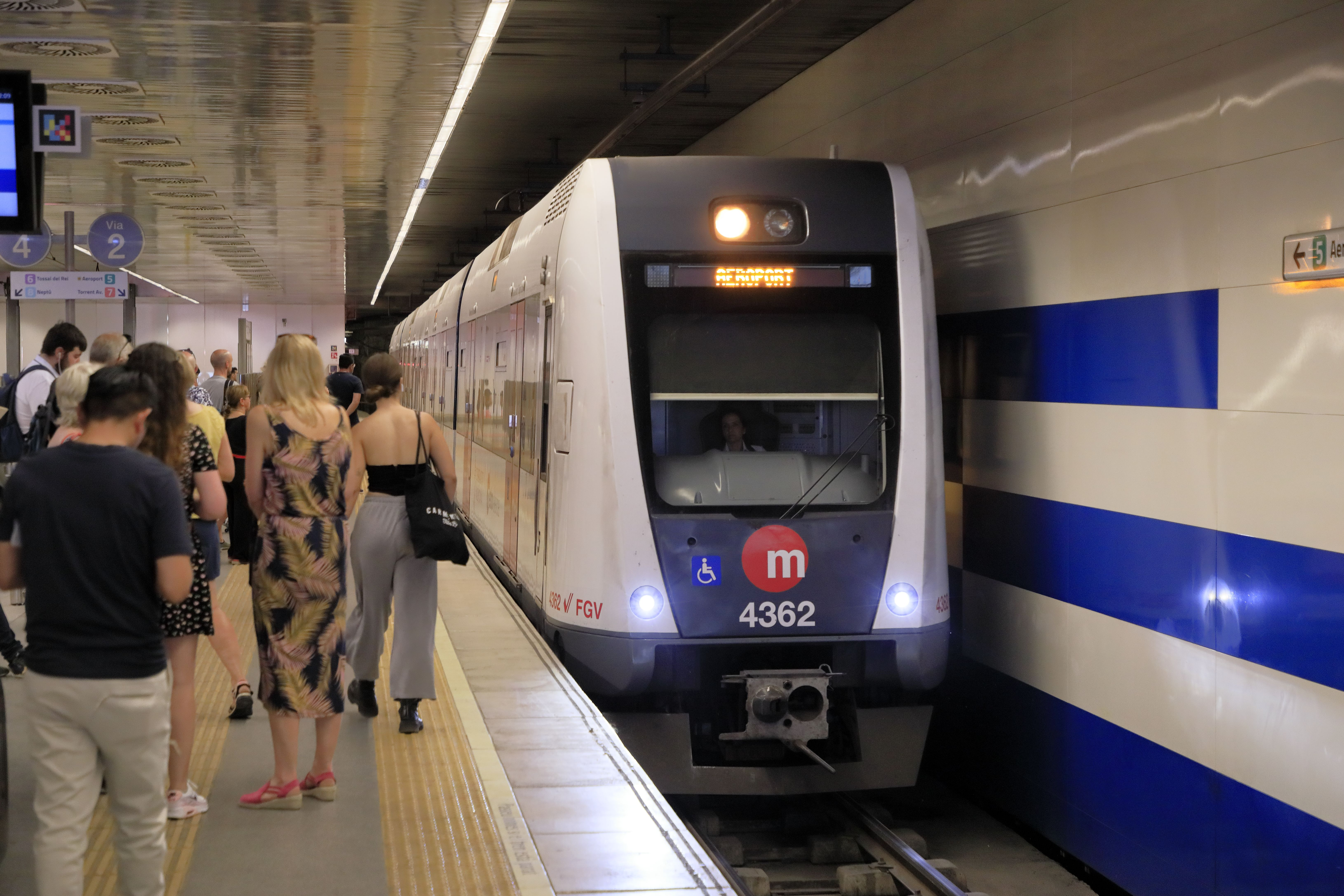
- Line 5 train at Marítim station

Overview
- Status: Active
- Owner: Generalitat Valenciana
- Locale: Valencia, Spain
- Termini: Marítim; Aeroport
- Stations: 18
- Color on map: Green

Service
- Type: Urban rail
- System: Metrovalencia
- Route number: 5
- Operator(s): FGV
- Ridership: 14,136,684 (2024)

History
- Opened: 2003

Technical
- Line length: 12.95 km (8.05 mi)
- Track gauge: 1,000 mm (3 ft 3 3/8 in) metre gauge
- Operating speed: 80 km/h (50 mph)

Line 5 is a metropolitan rail service in Metrovalencia, in Valencia, Spain. The line opened in 2003, and connects the Port of Valencia and Valencia Airport. All 18 stations in the line are underground, spanning a total length of 12.95 kilometers (8.05 miles). It serves as one of the key routes in the Metrovalencia network, providing direct access to and from the city center, and facilitating connections with tram lines.

== History ==
Line 5 opened on April 30, 2003, after a 2.3-kilometer (1.4-mile) tunnel segment was finished between Alameda and Ayora stations. All the new three stations still serve lines 5 and 7 today.

On April 2, 2007, the line was expanded to reach Marítim station, which was designed to act as an intermodal hub, connecting line 5 to the rest of the tram service and providing access to the port. Later that same year, on April 18, a 4.9-kilometer (3-mile) section between Mislata-Almassil and Valencia Airport stations was opened to the public. Following a major reworking of the Metrovalencia network in 2015, this station provides transfers for lines 5, 6, 7, and 8.

This line has undergone two major service interruptions in recent years: the first one took place between October 30 and December 2, 2024, when operations were suspended due to severe flooding that affected large areas of central Valencia; the second one occurred from June 27 to August 31, 2025, when the section between Aragó and Marítim stations was temporarily shut down in order to carry out infrastructure improvement works.
