= Rascanya =

- District of Valencia
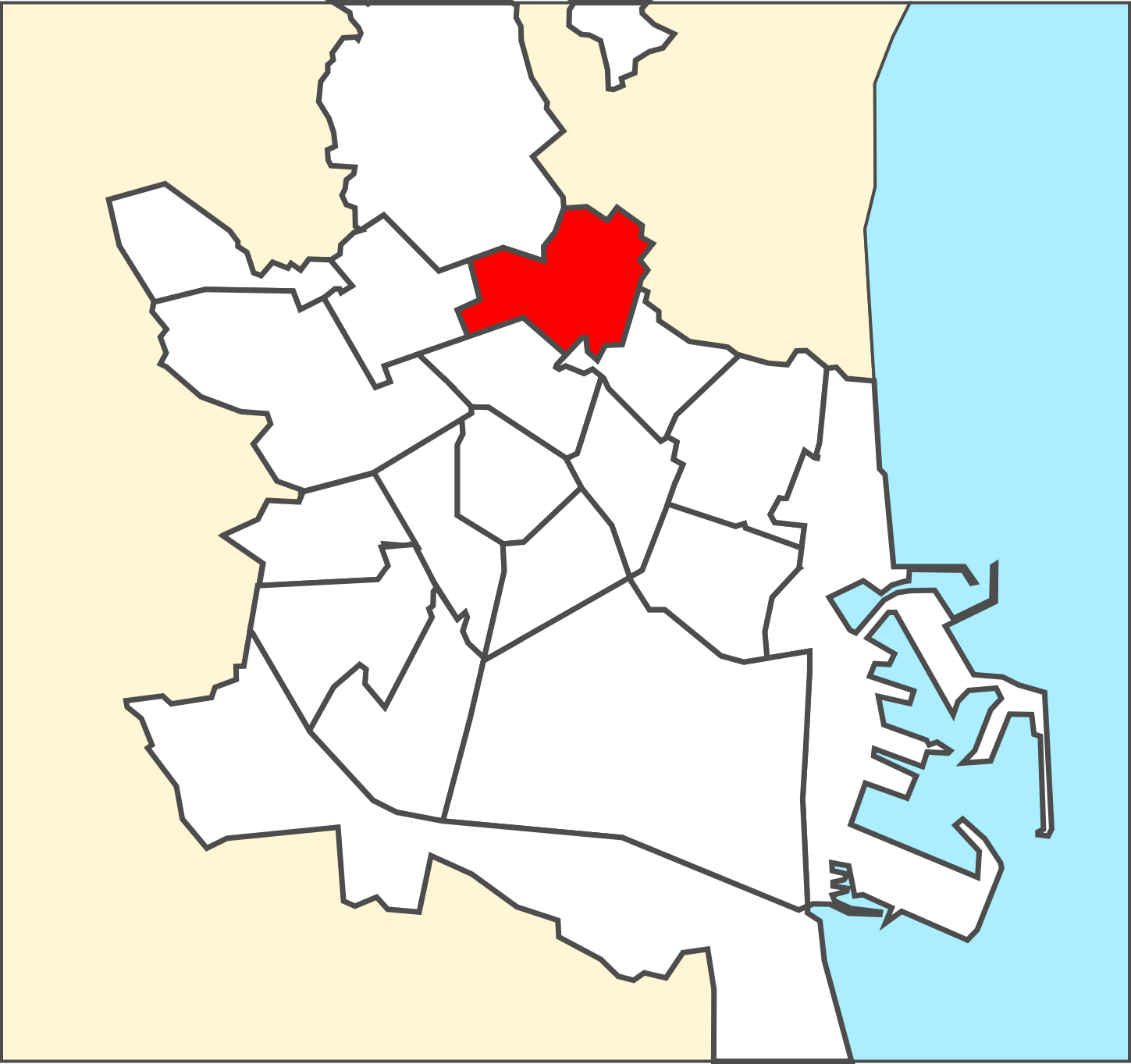
- Rascanya in the municipality of Valencia
- Country: Spain
- Autonomous community: Valencian Community
- Province: Valencia
- Comarca: Comarca de València
- Municipality: Valencia
- Wards: List: Els Orriols, Torrefiel, Sant Llorenç

Area
  - Total: 2.629 km^{2} (1.015 sq mi)

Population (2024)
  - Total: 56,703
  - Density: 21,570/km^{2} (55,860/sq mi)

Rascanya (Spanish: Rascaña) is a district of Valencia, Spain. It had 52,764 inhabitants as of 2017.

== Geography ==
=== Subdivision ===
The district is administratively divided into 3 wards (barris/barrios):

- Els Orriols
- Torrefiel
- Sant Llorenç
