= UTE3600 Series =

3600 Series
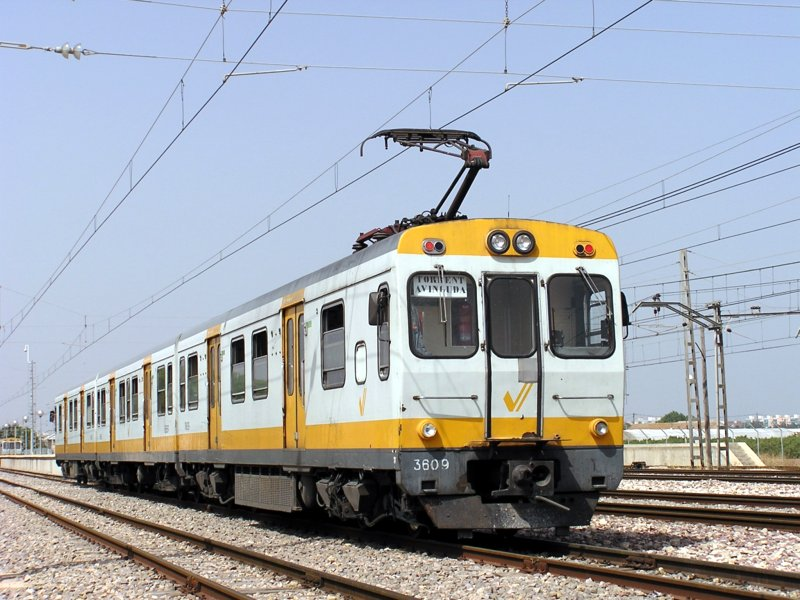
- 3600 series EMU with FGV colors in the Valencia to Vilanova de Castelló line.
- In service: 1982–2007
- Manufacturer: Babcock & Wilcox
- Formation: M-R-RM
- Operators: FGV, FEVE
- Lines served: Valencia to Lliria, Valencia to Betera, Valencia to Vilanova de Castelló, Valencia underground line 1, Santander FEVE line

Specifications
- Car body construction: Steel
- Car length: 19 m (62 ft 4 in)
- Maximum speed: 120 km/h (75 mph)
- Electric system: 1,500 V DC Overhead lines
- Current collection: Pantograph
- Braking system: Reostatic
- Safety system: FAP system
- Track gauge: 1,000 mm (3 ft 3 3/8 in) metre gauge

The 3600 series (Unidad de Tren Eléctrico 3600) is an EMU developed by Babcock & Wilcox for FEVE. It was introduced in 1982 by FEVE, transferred to Ferrocarrils de la Generalitat Valenciana in 1986 and withdrawn from service in 2006.

The 3600 series is quite notable for having been used in a quite number of lines and compositions.

== Lines on which 3600 series trains operated ==
- Santander FEVE Line: 3600–6600 series sets, 3 car sets and 6 car in double command, FEVE colors.
- Valencia to Vilanova de Castelló Line: 3600–6600 series sets, 3 car sets and 6 car in double command, FEVE colors, later modified to FGV colors and removed 6 sets.
- Valencia to Lliria Line: 3-car 3600–6600 series sets in FGV colors.
- Valencia to Bètera Line: 3-car 3600–6600 series sets in FGV colors.
- Valencia subway Line 1: 3-car 3600–6600 series sets in FGV colors, and 2 refurbished units (3601R and 3602R) with conditioning air, and better security systems for the underground service.
