= JR Shikoku 3600 series =

Japanese hybrid diesel multiple unit train type

3600 series
- A 3600 series set in November 2026
- In service: 2026–present
- Manufacturer: Kinki Sharyo
- Constructed: 2025–
- Entered service: 27 June 2026
- Number under construction: 66 vehicles (33 sets)
- Number built: 4 vehicles (2 sets)
- Formation: 2 cars per trainset
- Capacity: 272 (88 seated) per set
- Operator: JR Shikoku
- Depot: Tokushima
- Lines served: ■ Kōtoku Line; ■ Mugi Line; ■ Tokushima Line

Specifications
- Car body construction: Stainless steel
- Maximum speed: 100 km/h (62 mph)
- Prime mover: SA6D140HE-3 (1 per car)
- Engine type: Turbo-diesel
- Power output: 331 kW (444 hp) per engine

The 3600 series (3600系) is a hybrid diesel multiple unit (DMU) train type operated by Shikoku Railway Company (JR Shikoku) in Japan.

== Overview ==
JR Shikoku announced plans to introduce new hybrid trainsets in February 2024. The new trains are planned to replace ageing diesel railcars used on local services. Construction will be carried out by Kinki Sharyo.

In December 2025, JR Shikoku formally announced the 3600 series fleet.

The 3600 series began revenue service on the Mugi Line on 27 June 2026.

== Design ==
These are the first hybrid trainsets to be operated by JR Shikoku.

== Formation ==
Sets are formed as shown below.

	← Takamatsu Tokushima →	
Designation	Mc2	Mc1
Numbering	3600	3650
Capacity (total/seated)	142/49	130/39

- The Mc1 car has a toilet and a wheelchair space.

== Interior ==
Passenger accommodation consists of mostly longitudinal seating with some transverse seating bays in the Mc2 car.

== History ==
Two pre-production 2-car sets were delivered from the Kinki Sharyo plant in December 2025; thirty-three full-production trainsets are planned to be produced beginning in fiscal 2027.
