= Line 1 (Metrovalencia) =

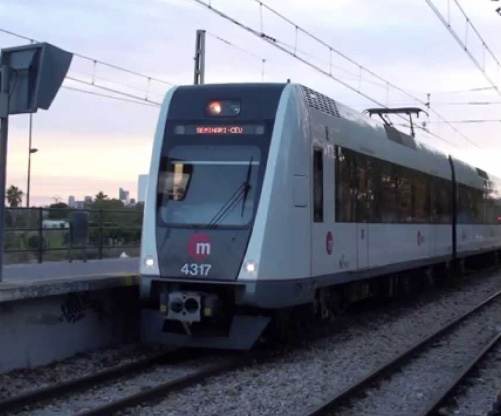
- A train in Rocafort station.

Overview
- Status: Active
- Owner: Generalitat Valenciana
- Locale: Valencia, Spain
- Termini: Bétera; Castelló
- Stations: 40
- Color on map: Yellow

Service
- Type: Urban rail
- System: Metrovalencia
- Route number: 1
- Operator: FGV
- Ridership: 5,469,643 (2020)

History
- Opened: 1988

Technical
- Line length: 72.145 km (44.83 mi)
- Track gauge: 1,000 mm (3 ft 3 3/8 in) metre gauge
- Operating speed: 80 km/h (50 mph)

Line 1 is the oldest rail service in Metrovalencia, in Valencia, Spain. The line opened in 1988 and has 40 stations with a total track length of 72.145 kilometres (44.829 mi). This makes Line 1 the longest line of the Metrovalencia, almost two times longer than Line 2.

The 1 operates during the day, stopping at the most important stations between Bétera station and Castelló station, specially the ones in the metropolitan area. For most stops outside the metropolitan area, passengers must request stop before alighting.

On July 3, 2006, an accident occurred on this line, between Jesús and Plaça d'Espanya station. 43 people were killed.
