= Torrefiel =

- Ward of Valencia
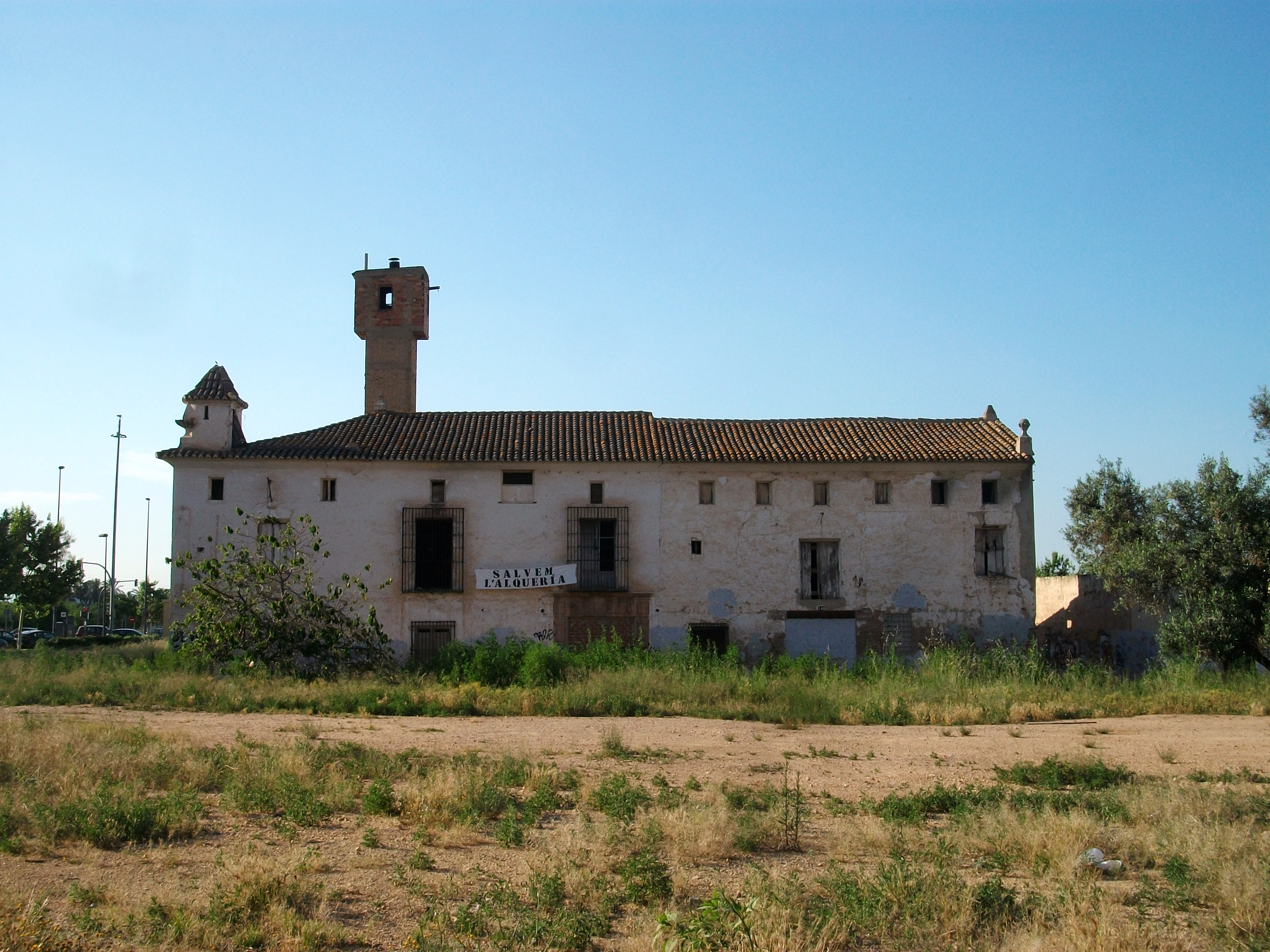
- Alquería de Falcó^{[es]}

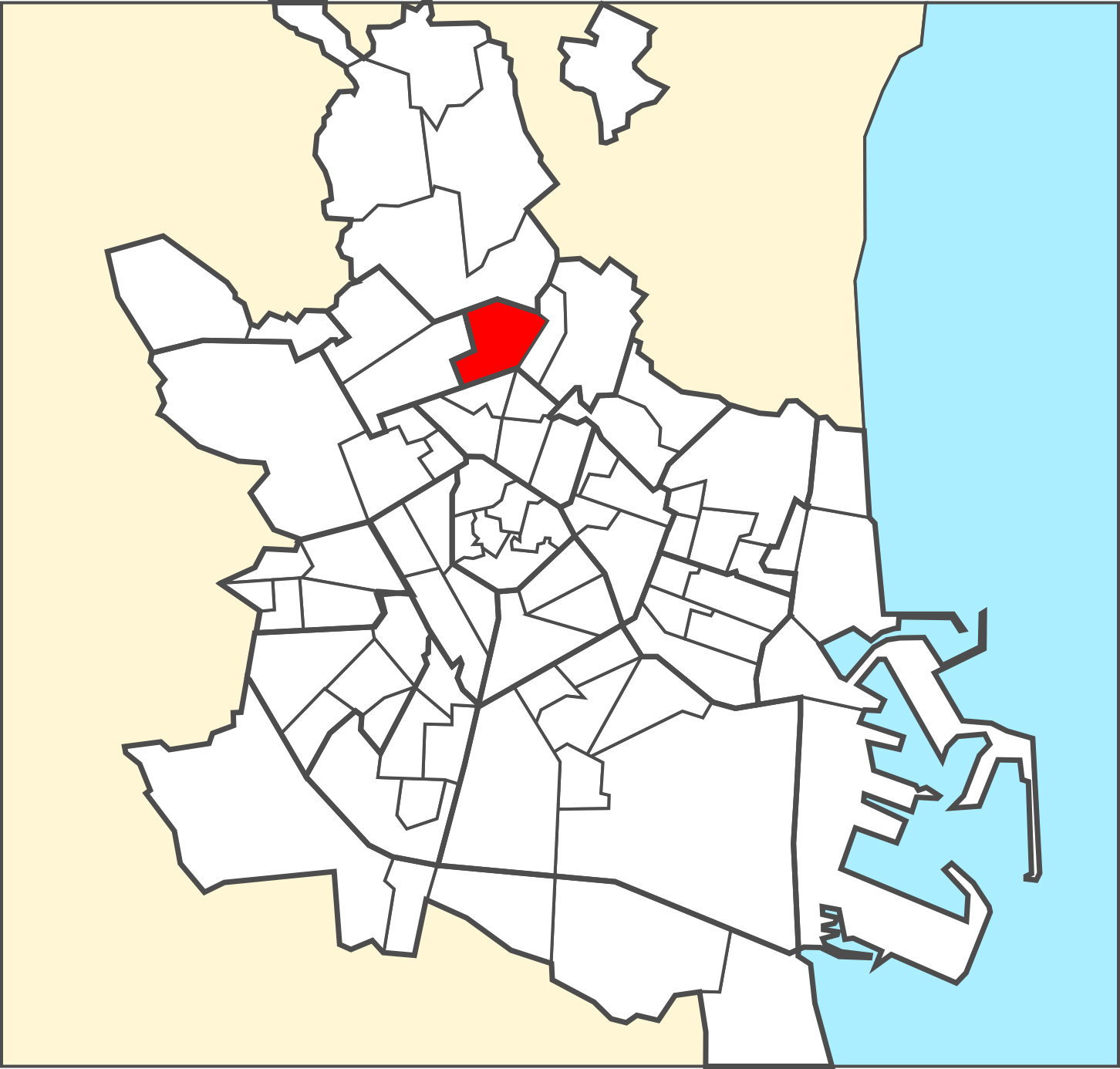
- Country: Spain
- Aut. community: Valencia
- Municipality: Valencia
- District: Rascanya

Area
  - Total: 0.700 km^{2} (0.270 sq mi)

Population (2016)
  - Total: 25,961
  - Density: 37,100/km^{2} (96,100/sq mi)

Torrefiel is a ward (barrio) of Valencia belonging to the district of Rascanya. It had 25961 inhabitants in 2016.
