= Line 3 (Metrovalencia) =

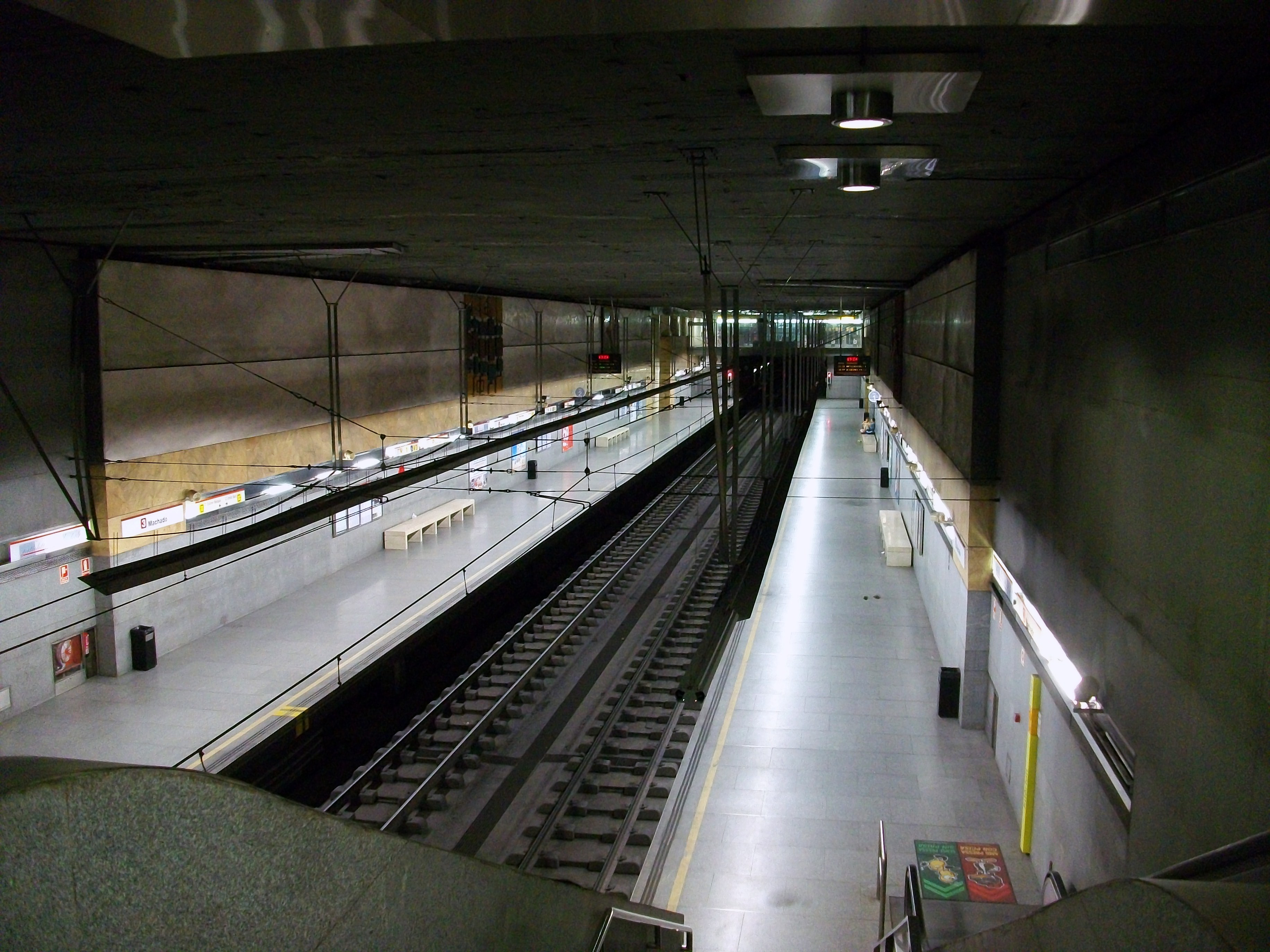
- Machado station in July 2011.

Overview
- Status: Active
- Owner: Generalitat Valenciana
- Locale: Valencia, Spain
- Termini: Rafelbunyol; Aeroport
- Stations: 26
- Color on map: Red

Service
- Type: Urban rail
- System: Metrovalencia
- Route number: 3
- Operator(s): FGV
- Ridership: 7,270,567 (2020)

History
- Opened: 1995

Technical
- Line length: 24.691 km (15.34 mi)
- Track gauge: 1,000 mm (3 ft 3 3/8 in) metre gauge
- Operating speed: 80 km/h (50 mph)

Line 3 is a line of Metrovalencia, the railway service in Valencia, Spain. It opened in 1995, and connects Rafelbunyol and the airport. The line has 26 stations and 24.7 kilometres (15.3 mi) of length.
