= Castelló, Valencia =

Castelló
- Municipality
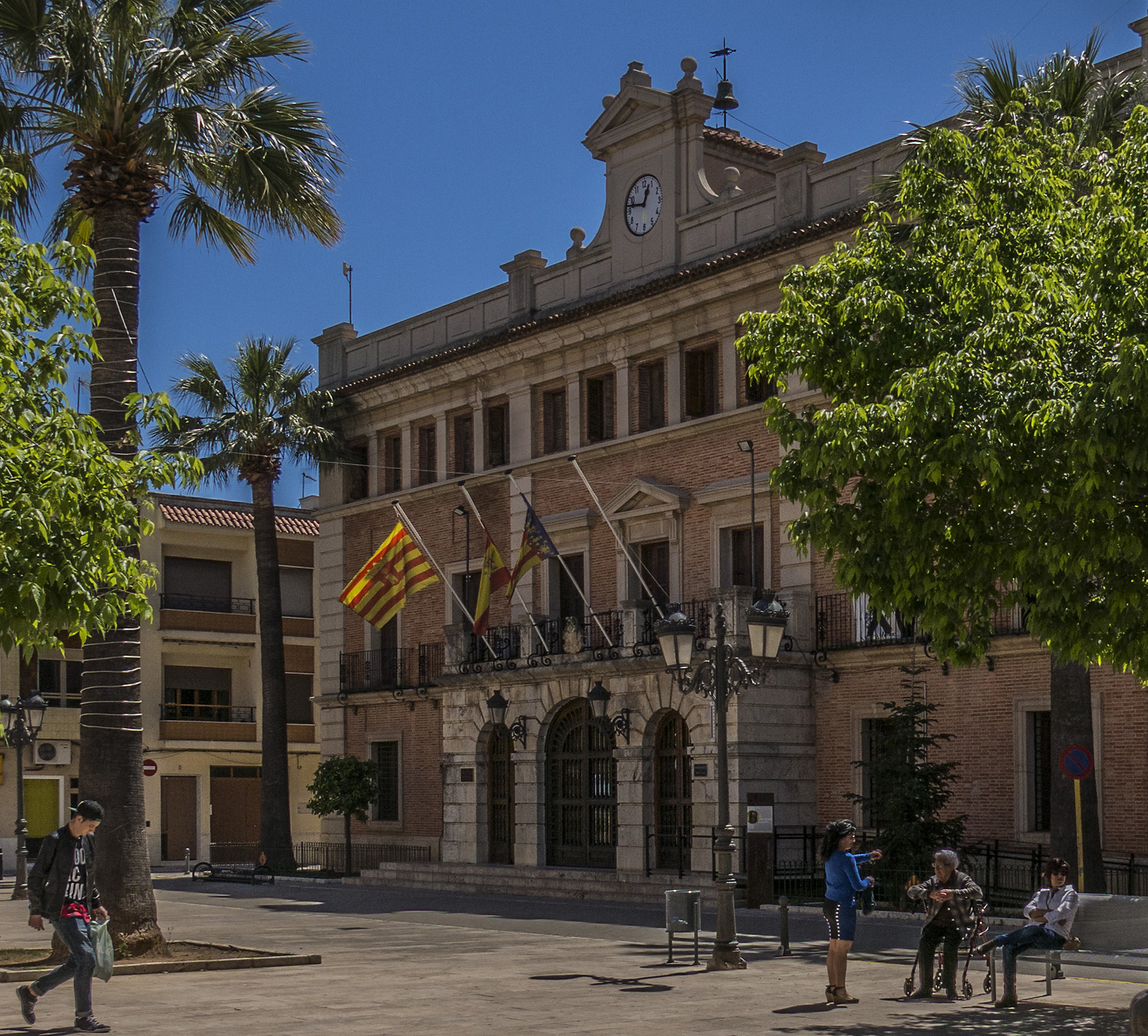
- Town hall

- Flag Coat of arms

- Location in Spain
- Coordinates: 39°4′40″N 0°30′46″W
- Country: Spain
- Autonomous community: Valencian Community
- Province: Valencia
- Comarca: Ribera Alta
- Judicial district: Alzira

Government
  - Alcalde: Òscar Noguera Alberola (Gent de Castelló i Esquerra–Compromís)

Area
  - Total: 20.3 km^{2} (7.8 sq mi)
- Elevation: 30 m (98 ft)

Population (2025-01-01)
  - Total: 6,972
  - Density: 343/km^{2} (890/sq mi)
- Demonym(s): Castellonenc, castellonenca
- Time zone: UTC+1 (CET)
  - Summer (DST): UTC+2 (CEST)
- Postal code: 46270
- Official language(s): Valencian
- Website: Official website

Castelló (Spanish: Villanueva de Castellón) is a municipality in the comarca of Ribera Alta in the Valencian Community, Spain. In September 2020, it officially changed its name from Castelló de la Ribera to its current name.

== See also ==
- List of municipalities in Valencia
