= Aeroport (Metrovalencia) =

Coordinates: 39.4915°N 0.4746°W

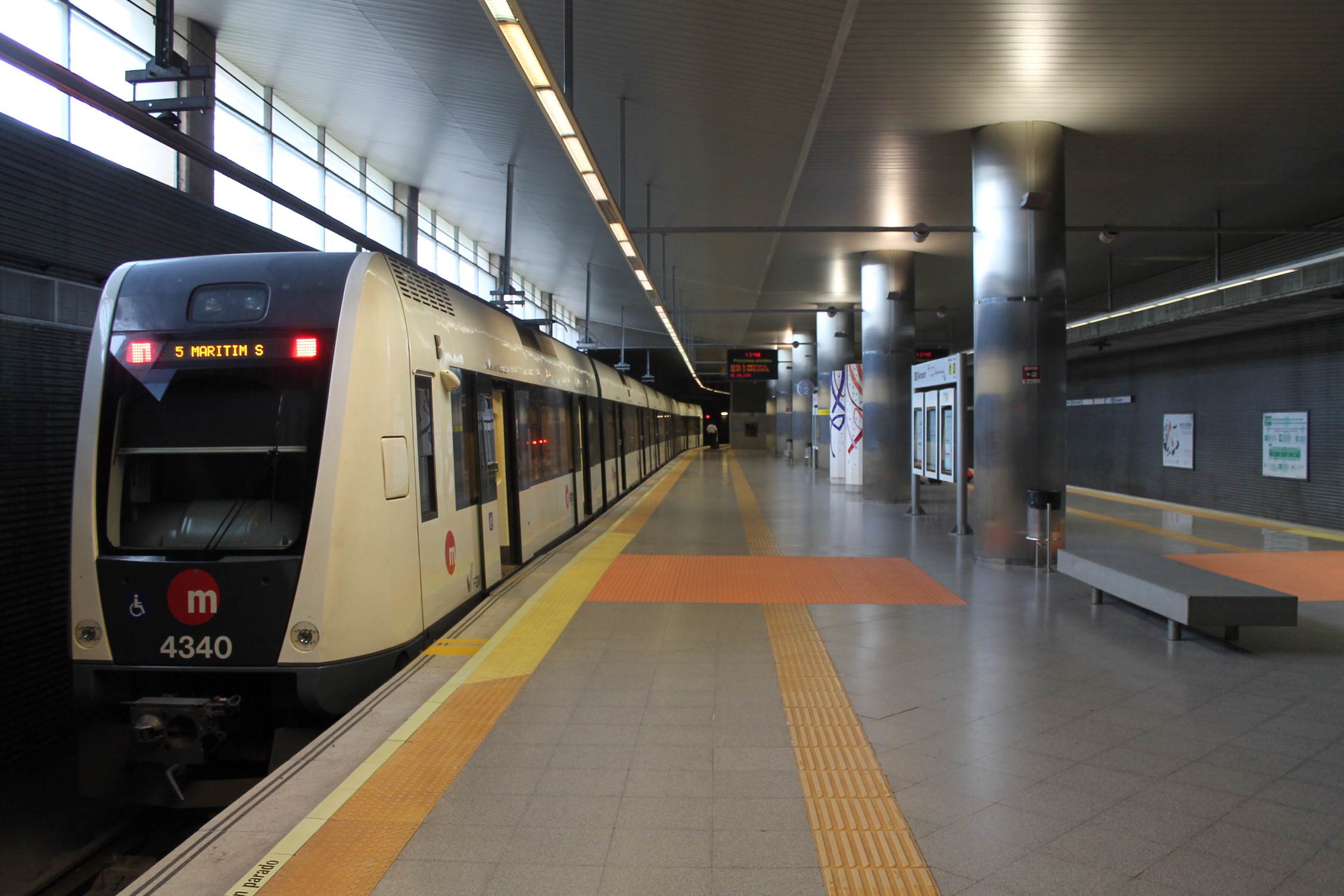

General information
- Location: Valencia Manises Airport, Valencian Community; Spain
- Platforms: 1 island
- Tracks: 4
- Connections: Bus

Construction
- Structure type: Underground
- Accessible: Yes

History
- Opened: 18 April 2007

Services
Preceding station	Metrovalencia	Following station
Terminus	Line 3	Roses towards Rafelbunyol
Terminus	Line 5	Roses towards Marítim
Location

Aeroport (Valencian: [aeɾoˈpɔɾt]) is a metro station of Metrovalencia network situated west of Valencia, Spain. The station is located at Valencia Manises Airport, near Avinguda d'els Arcs and the adjacent bus terminal, making it a major access point towards the Valencia city center and Valencia port.

In the first 10 years since the station's opening, line 5 of Metrovalencia between Aeroport and Marítim-Serrería stations was used by 186.6 million passengers. In 2025 it was one of 27 Metrovalencia stations which exceeded 1 million users.

The metro stop opened in April 2007 as part of a ten-station extension which cost over 200 million euro. Originally, it formed part of metro zone B; however, in September 2012, it was moved to metro zone D, in order to maximise revenue. After the number of metro zones was reduced in 2022 Aeroport is the sole station in metro zone C.
