= Marítim (Metrovalencia) =

Railway station in Valencia, Spain

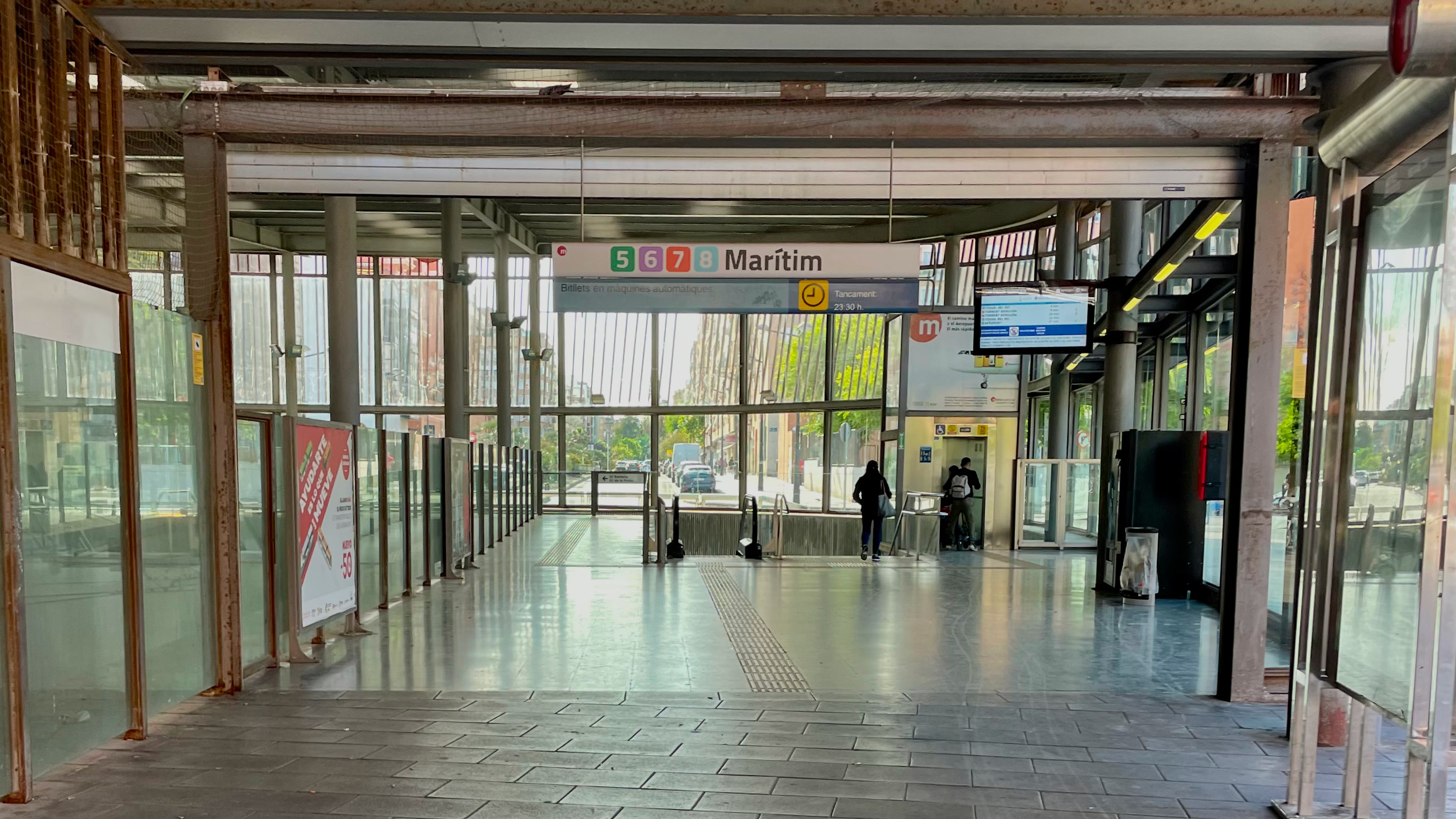
- The main station entrance

General information
- Location: Carrer de Jeroni de Montsoriu, Valencia; Spain
- Coordinates: 39.464611°N 0.337819°W
- Tracks: 4 (2 in use)

Construction
- Structure type: Underground

Other information
- Station code: 132
- Fare zone: A

History
- Opened: April 3, 2007; 19 years ago

Services
Preceding station	Metrovalencia	Following station
Ayora towards Aeroport	Line 5	Terminus
Ayora towards Torrent Avinguda	Line 7	Terminus
Terminus	Line 6	Francesc Cubells towards Tossal del Rei
Terminus	Line 8	Francesc Cubells towards Neptú
Location

Marítim (Valencian: [maˈɾitim]) is a metro station of the Metrovalencia network in Valencia, Spain, and is the terminus of Lines 5, 6, 7, and 8. It was opened on April 3, 2007, as an extension of Line 5 to connect with the existing surface tram lines to the east. This occurs via an underground cross-platform transfer on one of two island platforms. The southernmost platform is not in revenue use and does not have cross-platform fare gates. The station is located in a wide median space of Carrer Jeroni de Montsoriu. At the east end of the station, the tram tracks ramp up to street level and follow Carrer de Francesc Cubells.

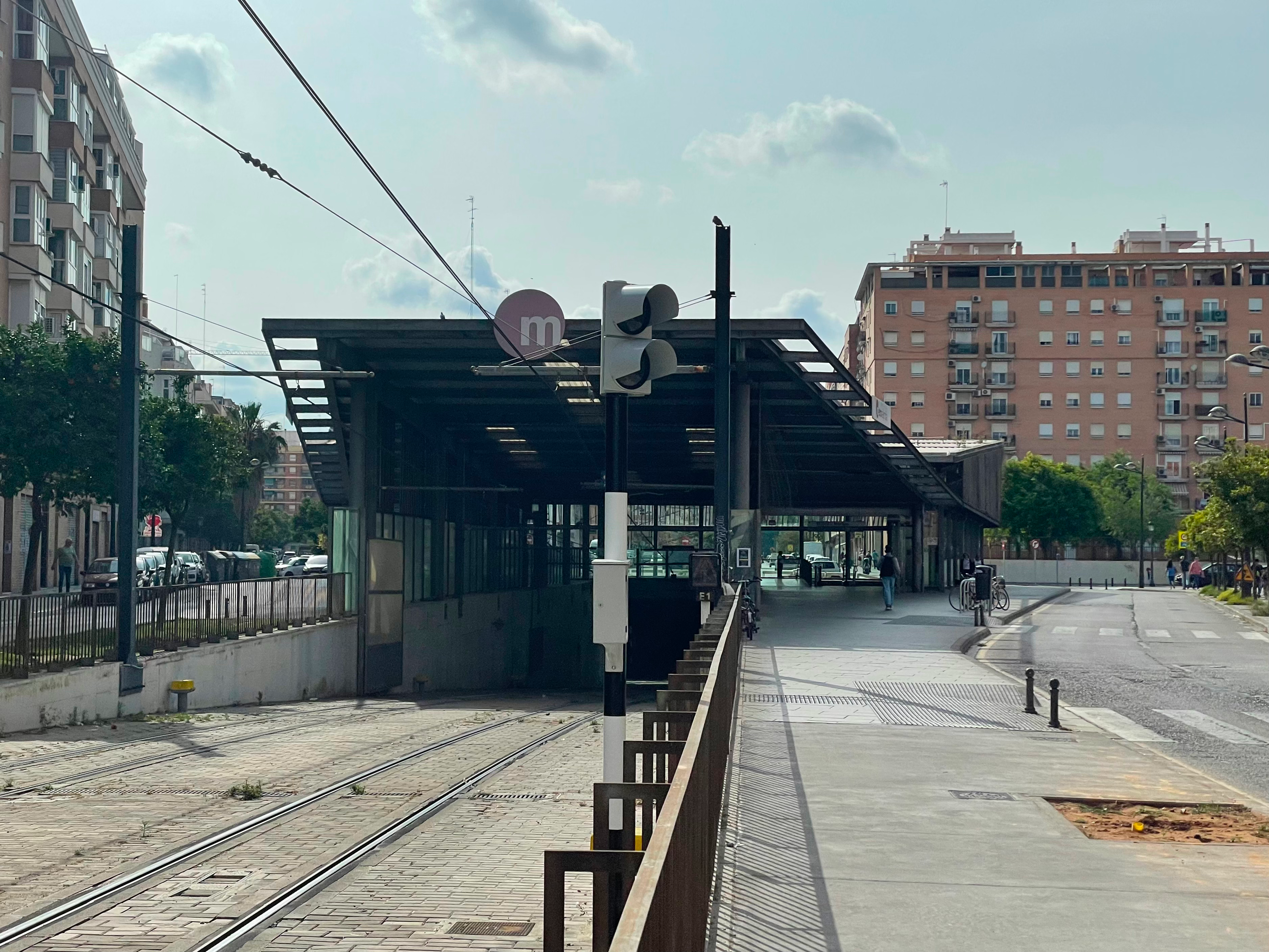
The tram ramp east of the station

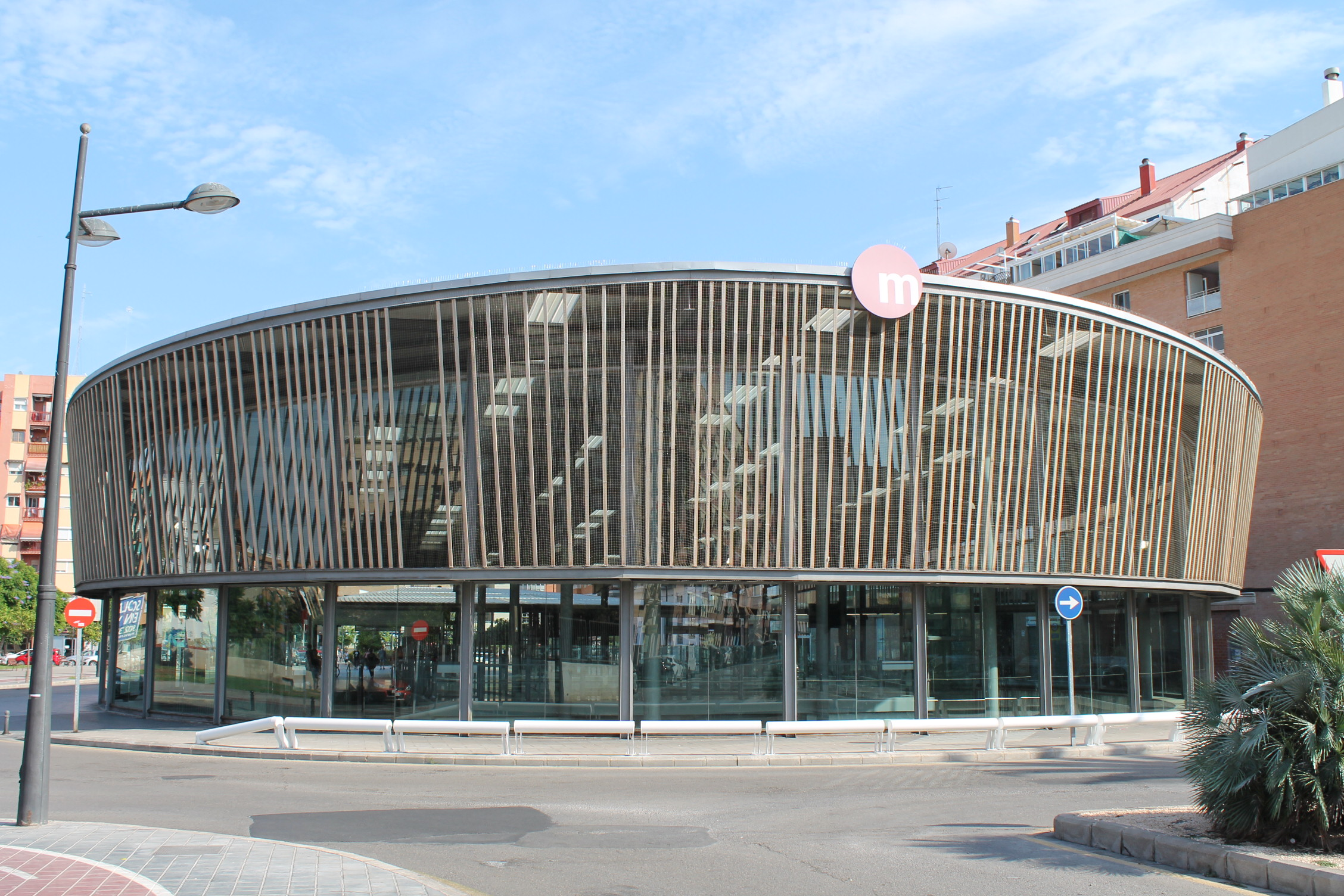
The exterior of the station (looking eastward)

When the station was originally opened, it had the name "Marítim-Serrería" and served only Line 5 (metro and tram). However, when many stations across Metrovalencia were being renamed with the opening of Line 10 in 2022, the name was changed to "Marítim".

== Station Layout ==
G	Street level	Exit/entrance, mezzanine
-1; Platform level	Westbound	← toward Aeroport (Ayora) ← toward Torrent Avinguda (Ayora)	Fare control
-1; Platform level	Island platform (metro paid area)		Fare control
-1; Platform level	Island platform (tram paid area)		Fare control
-1; Platform level	Northbound and to Beaches	toward Tossal del Rei (Francesc Cubells) → toward Neptú (Francesc Cubells) →
-1; Platform level	Northbound and to Beaches	(Track not currently used in tram revenue service)
-1; Platform level	Island platform (metro/tram paid area)		Fare control
-1; Platform level	Westbound	(Track not currently used in metro revenue service)	Fare control
