= Ferrocarrils de la Generalitat Valenciana =

Transport company in Valencia, Spain

- Industry: Railway
- Founded: 10 November 1986
- Headquarters: Valencia
- Key people: Rebeca Torró (President); Josep Vicent Boira i Maiques (Vice-President)
- Website: www.fgv.es

Ferrocarrils de la Generalitat Valenciana (Valencian pronunciation: [ˌfɛrokaˈrilz ðe la dʒeneɾaliˈtad valensiˈana], "Valencian Government Railways") or FGV is a Valencian public railway company which operates several 1,000 mm (3 ft 3 3/8 in) metre gauge lines, in the autonomous community of Valencia, Spain.

The company currently operates the lightrail and tram systems of the cities of Valencia (Metrovalencia) and Alicante (Alicante Tram).

It also operates a non-electrified 62 km (39 mi) long line, between Benidorm and Dénia, in Alicante province.

The company is owned by the Generalitat Valenciana (i.e. the autonomous government body of the Valencian Community).

== History ==
=== Establishment of FGV ===
FGV was founded as a company in 1986, and on 1 January 1987 took over all remaining narrow gauge railways in the Valencian Community. These had previously been part of the nationally owned FEVE system.

The newly formed railway system consisted of various electrified suburban lines around Valencia and the diesel-worked Alicante to Denia railway. Much of the infrastructure was in a poor state following years of neglect by the FEVE administration and patronage was consequently low.

=== Investment in the Valencia system ===
The early years of FGV saw much investment in the Valencia suburban system. The lines to the north and south of the city were connected by cross-town tunnels which were developed into the current metro system. FGV also introduced the first modern tram in Spain, partly running on the alignment of narrow gauge railways.

Both the metro and trams systems are being developed through the addition of new lines. Projects are also in hand to modernise the classic parts of the system through realignments and new rolling stock.

=== Investment in the Alicante system ===
In Alicante too, the narrow gauge railway is being developed into a modern tramway. It has been extended through a tunnel to Mercado and will ultimately reach the RENFE railway station through an extension of this tunnel. The tram system is also being extended in other directions.

The Alicante to Dénia railway line is being electrified as far as Benidorm and will be served by tram-trains (vehicles that can run on both railway and tramway infrastructure). The remaining section to Denia will continue to be diesel-worked for the time being and trainsets have been modernised for this purpose.

In Benidorm, a local tram service is also being planned. This will branch off the main railway line and serve the centre of this town.

=== Future projects ===
FGV is seeking to take over the Xàtiva to Alcoi railway from Renfe. The mountain railway is currently in a poor state and served only by three trains per day and direction. The company also provided assessment to the city of Rosario in Argentina for its future Rosario Tramway, a project which is largely based on the Valencia system.

== Rolling stock ==
=== In use ===
Series	Photo	Year	Builder	Length	Passengers	Units	Communications	ATO	Lines	Depot	Notes
3800		1994–1995 (3801–3821), 1998 (3822–3825)	Siemens and Duewag (electronics); CAF and GEC-Alsthom (cars)	23.78 m or 78 ft 1/4 in	201 (65 seats)	25 (3801–3825)	Standard GSM	no		Tarongers	Oldest operating units in the network
4200		2006–2007	Bombardier	32.366 m or 106 ft 2 1/4 in	277	19 (4201–4219)	Standard GSM	no		Tarongers and El Campello	
4100	Campo de Golf–Costa Blanca, automotor eléctrico 4155	2007	Vossloh	37.01 m or 121 ft 5 1/8 in	315	9	Standard GSM	?		El Campello	
4300 (4 cars)		2007	Vossloh España	60.49 m or 198 ft 5 1/2 in	588 (116 seats)	42	UIC 751-3	yes		Hermanos Machado, Valencia Sud and Torrent	
4300 (5 cars)		2007	Vossloh España	75 m or 246 ft 3/4 in	750	20	UIC 751-3	yes		Hermanos Machado, Valencia Sud and Torrent	
5000	Unidad de tren-tram serie 5000 estacionada en la estación de Dénia de FGV.	2020	Vossloh	37.5 m or 123 ft 3/8 in	303	6	Standard GSM	?		?	

=== Former rolling stock ===
Series	Photo	Year	Builder	Length	Passengers	Units	Communications	ATO	Depot	Notes
UTE3600 Series		1982–1983	Babcock & Wilcox	47.166 m or 154 ft 8 7/8 in	?	10 manufactured, 3 units preserved (3602, 3604 and 3609)	UIC 751-3	no	Torrent	
3700 Series		1987–1990	CAF, MTM, BBC, ASEA, MACOSA	47.166 m or 154 ft 8 7/8 in	?	40 manufactured	UIC 751-3	no	Torrent	
3900 with ATO		1994–1995	GEC-Alsthom	60 m or 196 ft 10 1/4 in	596 (120 seats)	2 (3910 and 3916)	UIC 751-3	yes	Hermanos Machado	ATO installed in 2011
2500 Series	MAN 2500 Alicante	2005	Sunsundegui	17.5 m or 57 ft 5 in	259	6	?	no	?	
