= Trams in Spain =

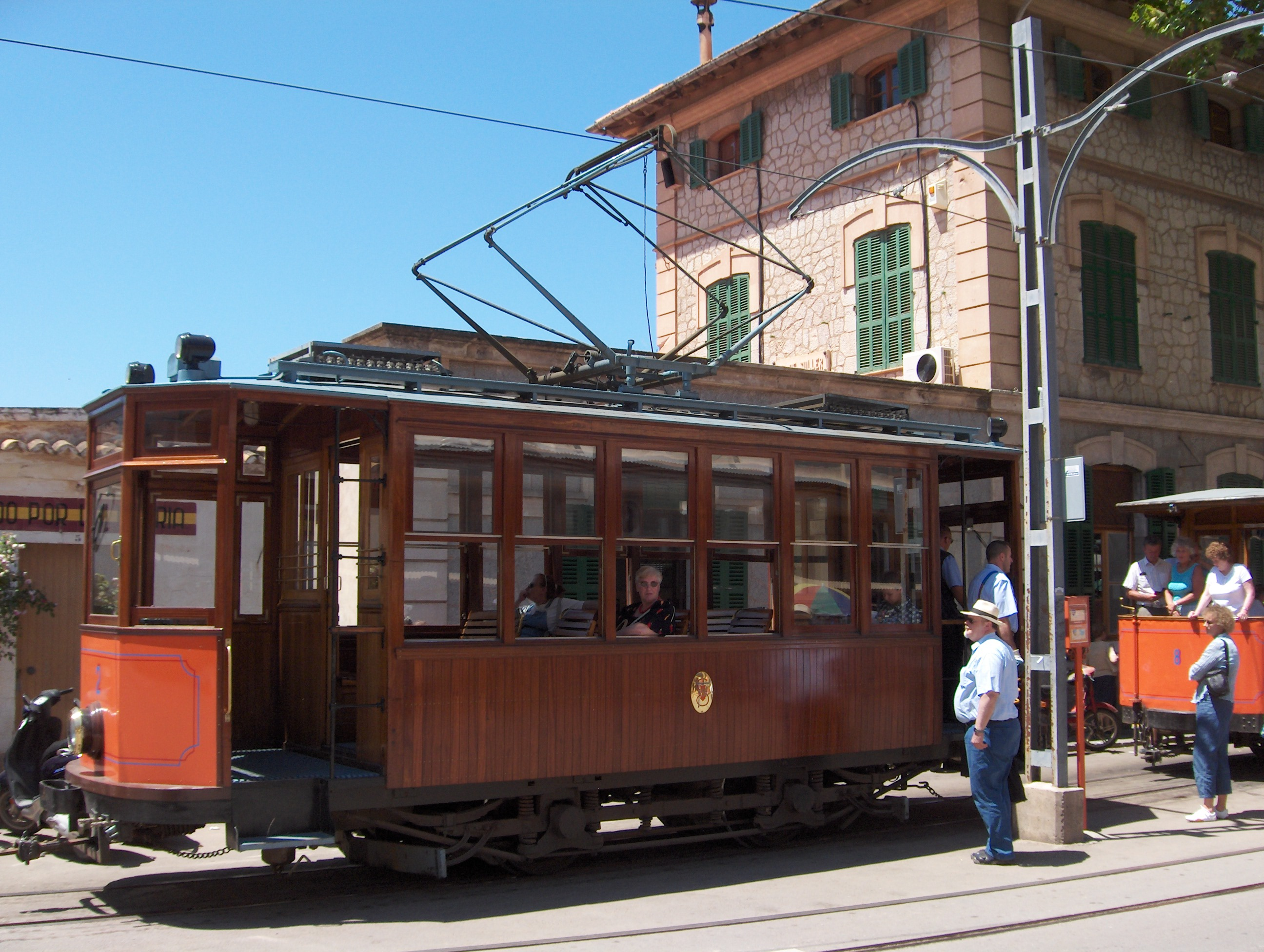
Sóller motor tramcar.

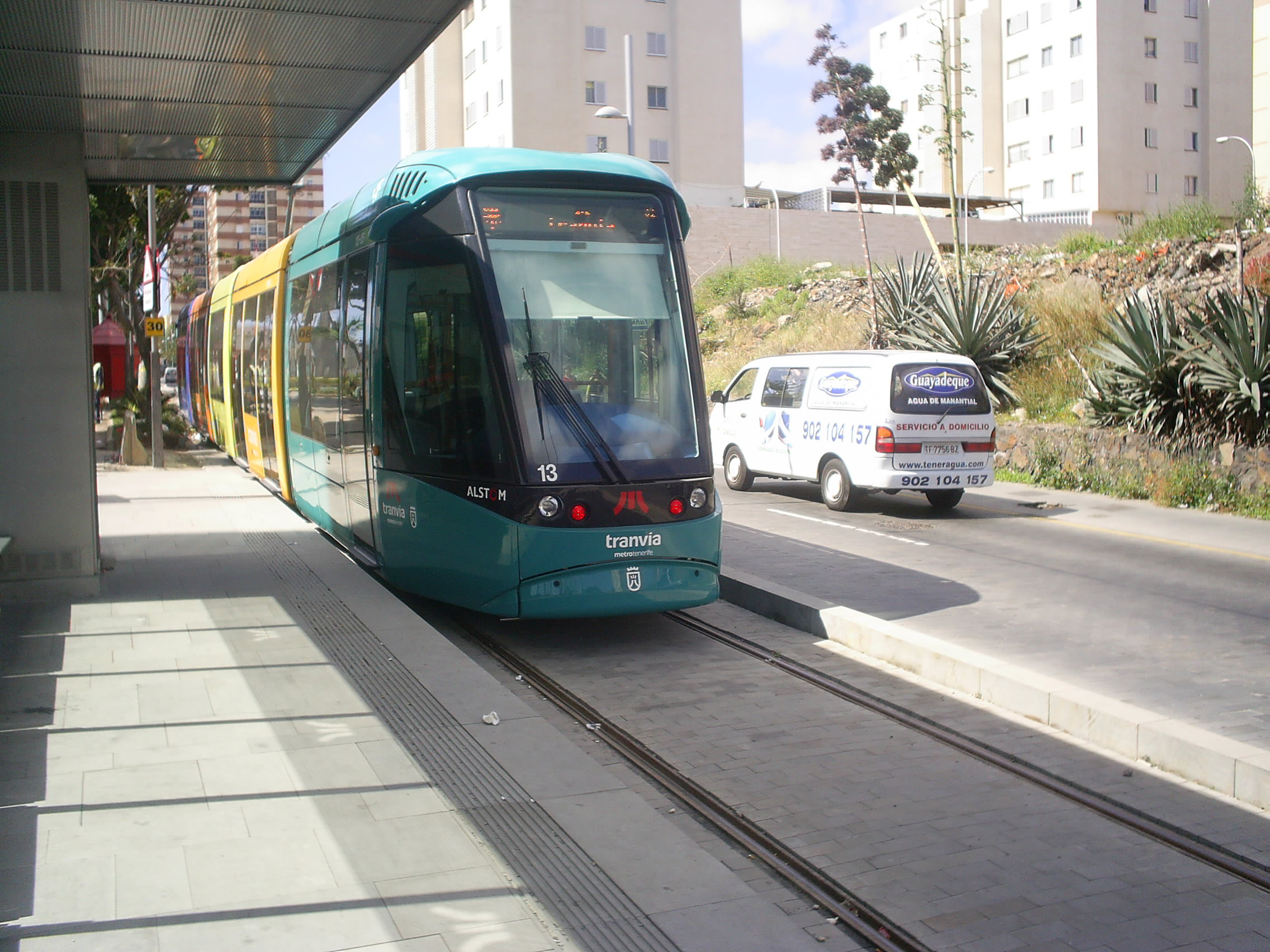
Tranvía de Tenerife.

Trams in Spain go back to an animal-drawn Madrid tramway network, which opened in 1871. Steam tramway traction started in Spain in 1879, and electric trams first operated in 1899.

Spanish tramway networks were dismantled in the 1960s and 1970s, but have gradually been reintroduced since 1994. At present, there are plans to add 13 new Spanish tram networks to the nine currently operating.

== History ==
The history of tramways in Spain began with animal-drawn trams in the nineteenth century, in Madrid (1871), Barcelona and Bilbao (1872), Valencia (1876), Valladolid (1881), Zaragoza (1885), Sevilla (1887) and Palma de Mallorca (1891).

In 1879, the Madrid-Leganés tramway began working with steam traction, and in 1899 the first electrified line ran. In Barcelona, steam traction was introduced in 1877 (at Sant Andreu), and the first electrified line in 1899.

The first Spanish city to introduce an electric tram service was Bilbao, with the line Bilbao-Santurtzi, electrified in 1896 and managed by a predecessor of the current Transportes Colectivos. Steam trams began running in Valencia in 1892 and the first line was electrified in 1900. In Zaragoza, the Torrero line was electrified in 1902, and electric trams came to Palma de Mallorca in 1916. Valladolid network was totally electrified in 1911.

In many other cities, trams were common through much of the twentieth century. However, they were dismantled in the 1960s and 1970s, on the basis that they obstructed traffic on the streets of large cities. Then, in the late twentieth century, they were once again considered and, in some cities, began running again.

== Today's tramway networks ==
Spanish cities with tramway networks.

The Murcia tramway is one of several modern tram systems opened in the 21st century in Spain.

Valencia was the first Spanish city to reintroduce the tram, in 1994. The success of the modern tramway network in Valencia led to the extension of its lines on three occasions.

After Valencia came Bilbao (2002), Alicante (2003), Barcelona (2004) and, in October 2006, the inauguration of the 4.7 km (2.9 mi) long Vélez-Málaga Tram (which linked Vélez-Málaga with the coastal part of Torre del Mar).

These lines were followed by the Metro Ligero de Madrid (2007), in the Madrid neighborhoods of Sanchinarro and las Tablas (ML-1), and linking the capital with Boadilla del Monte, Alcorcón and Pozuelo de Alarcón (ML2, ML3). Parla Tram (ML-4) was also inaugurated in 2007.

Then came Seville, where a tramway network named MetroCentro has been running since spring 2007, Tenerife (2007), Murcia (2007), and Vitoria (2008).

In Zaragoza, the commercial service began on 19 April 2011. The Jaén Tram opened in 2011 but was closed a few weeks after service began. After numerous delays, the Granada Metro opened in 2017 and the Cádiz opened on 26 October 2022.

== Projects ==
In Spain, 13 tram networks are currently planned to be added to the nine already operating.

New projects, in Cordoba, Jerez, Palma, Tarragona and Toledo, total 265 km (165 mi) in length and two billion euros in investment. Active construction on the Tranvía Metropolitano de Alcalá de Guadaíra has been taking place since 2007, along with lines in Dos Hermanas and Mairena del Aljarafe.

Other networks are proposed for Jerez de la Frontera, Córdoba, Huelva, Pamplona, Almeria, León, Elche, Burgos, Salamanca, Toledo, Palma de Mallorca, Leioa-Sestao, Baracaldo, el Alto Deva.

There have also been plans to install a tramway in Oviedo (a project to implement this mode of transport, by the PSOE, was discarded after the PP defeated it at an election). In addition, Madrid is expanding its LRT (light rail) network on its outskirts.

Finally, a heritage tramway opened in the city of La Coruña in 1997, following additions and alterations to the road. Service was suspended in 2011, but reopening has been proposed and was still under consideration in 2019.

== See also ==
- History of rail transport in Spain
- List of town tramway systems in Spain
- List of trolleybus systems in Spain
- Rail transport in Spain
