= Transport in Spain =

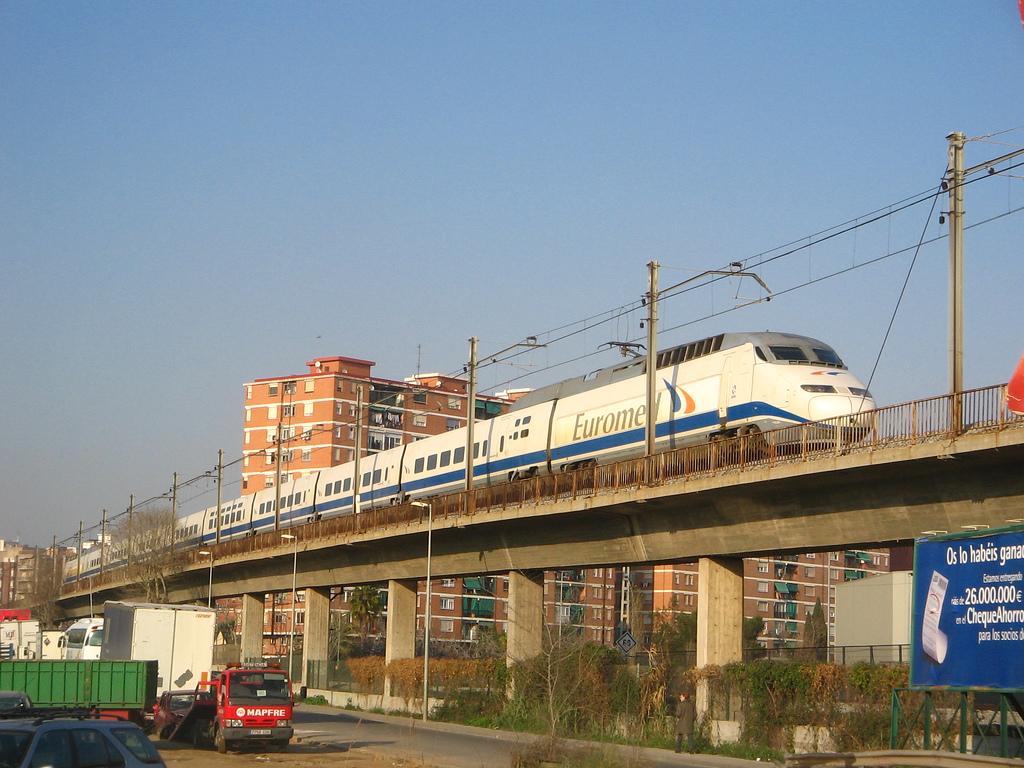
Euromed train

Transport in Spain is characterised by a network of roads, railways (including having high speed rail network that is the second longest in the world), trams, air routes, and ports. Its geographic location makes it an important link between Europe, Africa, and the Americas. Major forms of transit generally radiate from the capital, Madrid, located in the centre of the country, to link with the capitals of the autonomous communities.

Spanish transit is marked by a high degree of integration between its long-distance railway system and inner-city metro systems, although the historic use of broad gauge has limited integration with its neighbours. Spain is currently working to increase and improve linkage with the rail systems of France and Portugal, including the high-speed rail line between Madrid and Lisbon.

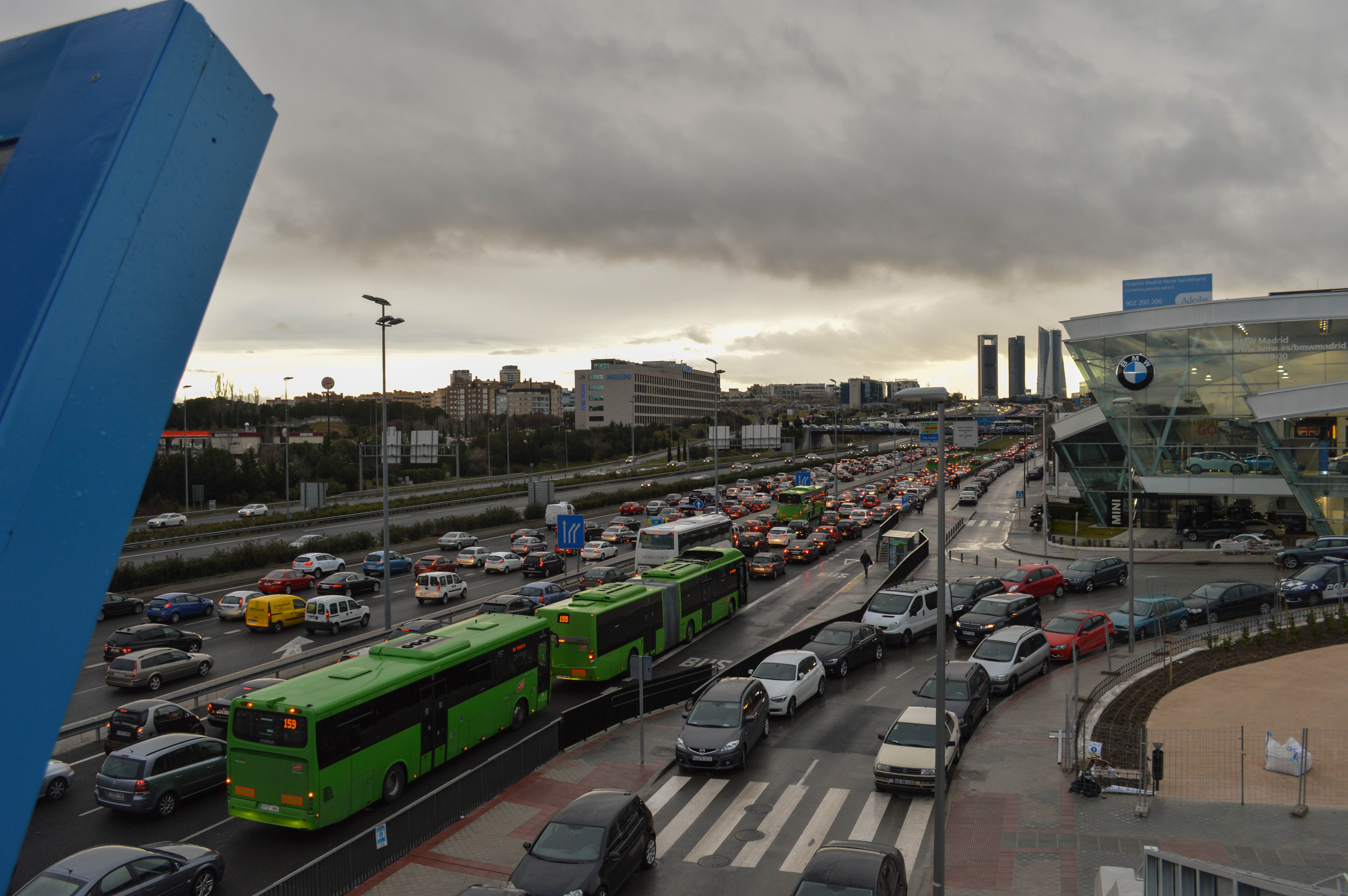
A motorway in Spain

Spain's highway system is developed, with both tolled and free motorways. Air traffic is routed through several international and regional airports, the largest of which is Barajas International Airport in Madrid.

== Rail transport and AVE transport ==
High speed network in Spain as of December 2024

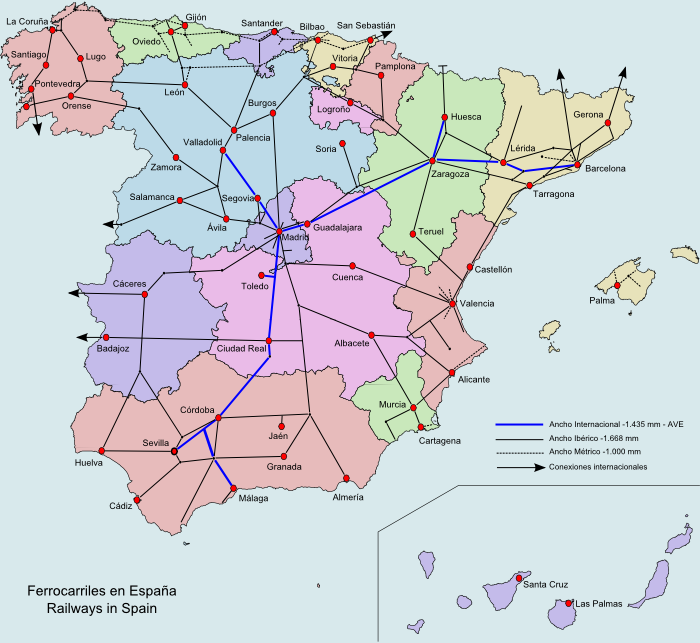
Spanish Railways network

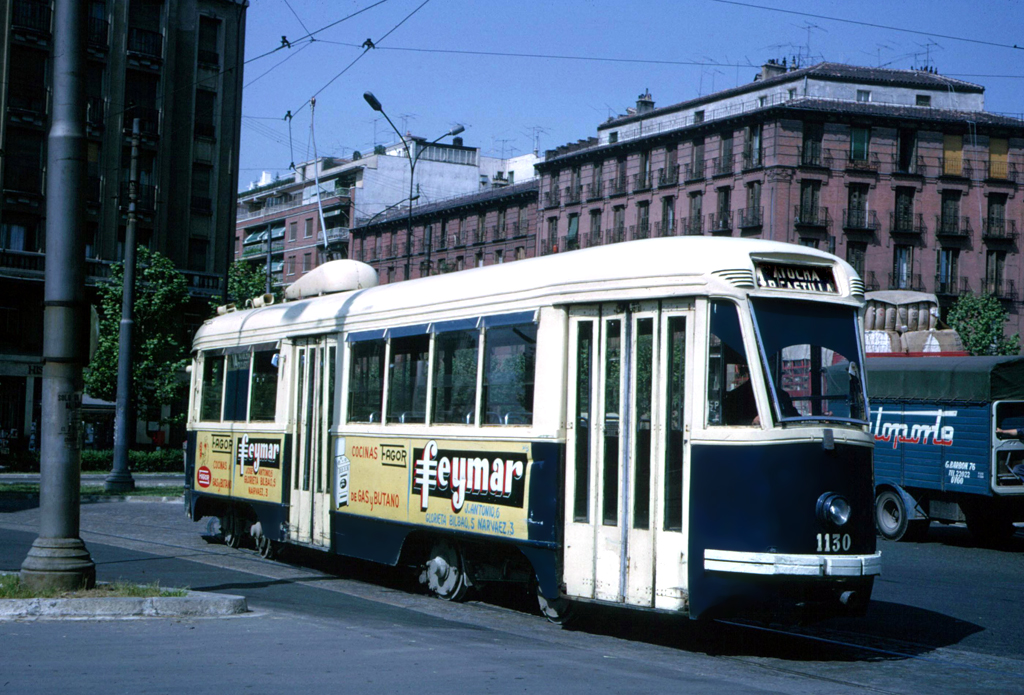
A PCC tram build by MMC (Material Móvil y Construcciones) in Madrid in 1969, near Atocha Station.

Spanish railways date from 1848. The total route length in 2017 was 15,333 km, of which 9,699 km were electrified. Four different track gauges are used in Spain.

- Iberian gauge (1,668 mm (5 ft 5 21/32 in)): 11,333 km (6,538 km electrified at 3 kV DC)
- Standard gauge (1,435 mm (4 ft 8 1/2 in)): 2,571 km (all electrified at 25 kV AC)
- Metric gauge (1,000 mm (3 ft 3 3/8 in)): 1,207 km (400 km electrified at 1.5 kV DC)
- Narrow gauge (914 mm (3 ft)): 28 km (all electrified)

Most railways are operated by Renfe; some narrow gauge lines are operated by other carriers in individual autonomous communities and high-speed standard gauge lines are also operated by Ouigo and Iryo. It is proposed to build or convert more standard gauge lines, including some dual gauging of broad gauge lines, especially where these lines link to adjacent countries.

A high-speed rail line (AVE) between Madrid and Seville was completed in 1992. In 2003, high-speed service was inaugurated on a new line from Madrid to Lleida and extended to Barcelona in 2008. The same year, lines from Madrid to Valladolid and from Córdoba to Málaga were inaugurated. In 2010, AVE line Madrid-Cuenca-Valencia was inaugurated.

=== Cities with metro/light rail systems ===
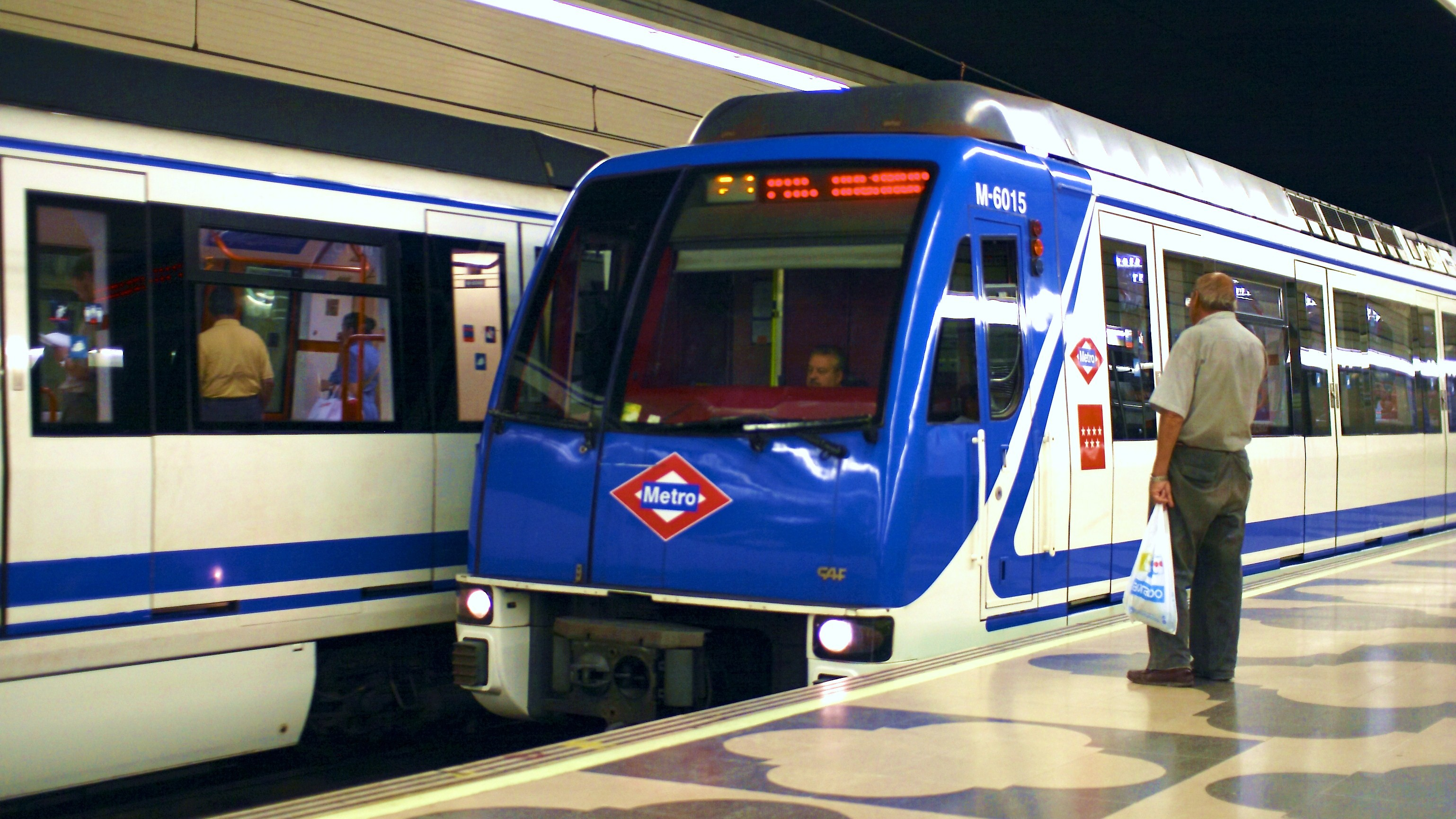
Madrid Metro

Metro (red) and tram (green) systems in Spain.

- Alicante - Alicante Tram
- Barcelona - Barcelona Metro and Tram
- Bilbao - Bilbao Metro and Bilbao tram (Euskotren Tranbia)
- Castellon - Trolleybus
- A Coruña - under construction
- Granada - Granada Metro
- Jaén - Jaén Tram - completed but not operated
- León - León tram - completed but not operated
- Madrid - Madrid Metro
- Málaga - Málaga Metro
- Murcia - Murcia tram
- Palma - Palma Metro
- Parla - Parla Tram
- Santa Cruz de Tenerife - Tenerife Tram
- Seville - Seville Metro and MetroCentro
- Valencia - Metrovalencia
- Vélez-Málaga - Vélez-Málaga Tram - ceased operations
- Vitoria-Gasteiz - Vitoria-Gasteiz tram (Euskotren Tranbia)
- Zaragoza - Zaragoza Tram

=== Railway links with adjacent countries ===
- Andorra – no (Andorra has no railways)
- France – yes – break-of-gauge (1,668 mm (5 ft 5 21/32 in))/(1,000 mm (3 ft 3 3/8 in))/(1,435 mm (4 ft 8 1/2 in)) (new high-speed line without any break-of-gauge)
- Portugal – yes, same gauge
- Morocco – no – proposed undersea tunnel. break-of-gauge (1,668 mm (5 ft 5 21/32 in))/(1,435 mm (4 ft 8 1/2 in))
- Gibraltar – no (Gibraltar has no railways)

==== Tunnel across the Strait of Gibraltar ====
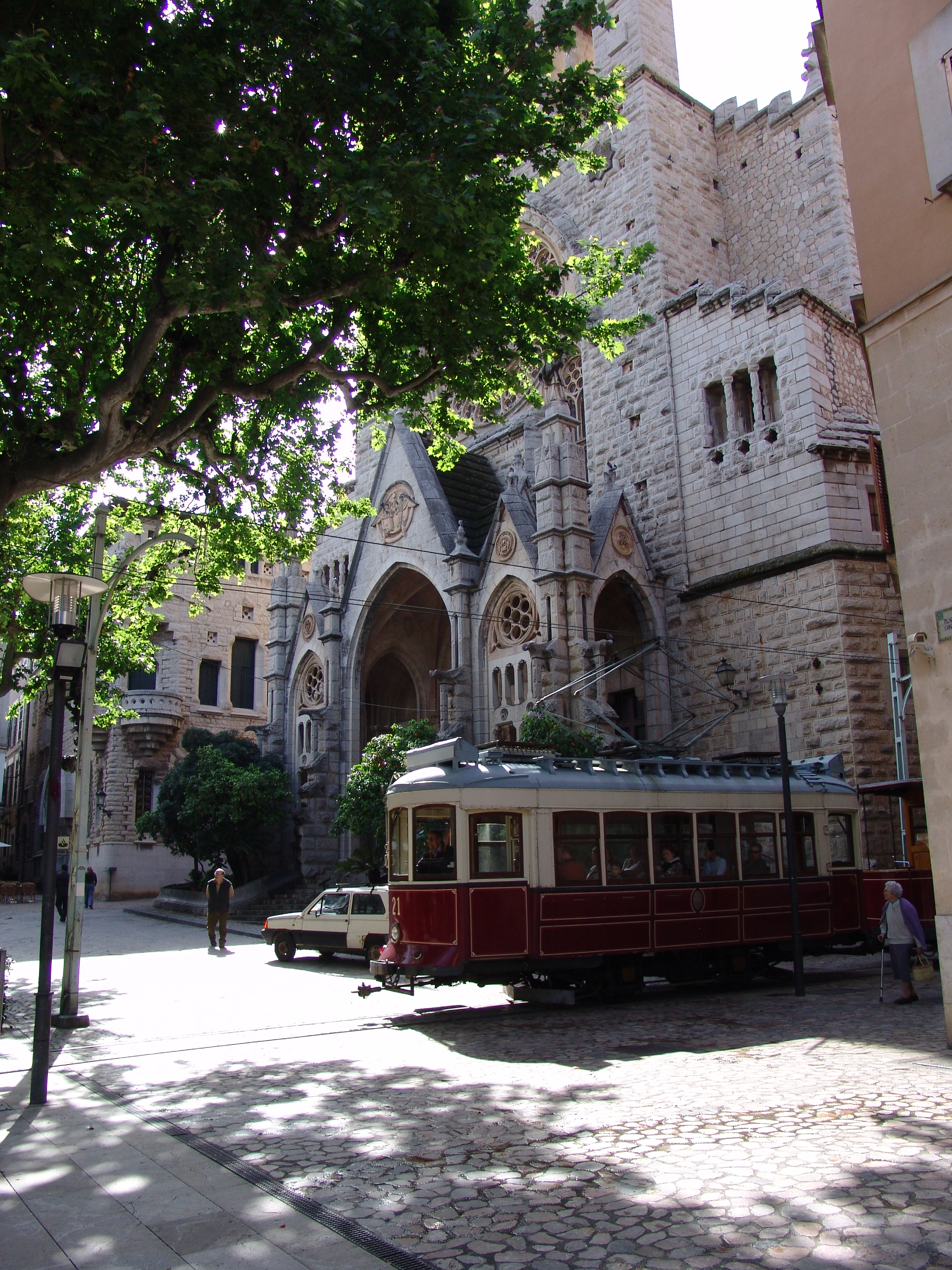
Historical tram.

In December 2003, Morocco and Spain agreed to explore the construction of an undersea rail tunnel across the Strait of Gibraltar, to connect their rail systems.

=== High-speed rail ===
Alta Velocidad Española (AVE) is a high-speed rail service in Spain operated by Renfe, the Spanish national railway company, at speeds of up to 330 km/h (205 mph). The name is literally translated from Spanish "Alta Velocidad Española" (Spanish High Speed), but its initials are also a play on the word ave, meaning "bird". As of July 2024, the Spanish high-speed rail network is the longest HSR network in Europe with 3,966 km (2,464 mi) and the second longest in the world, after China's.

AVE trains run on a network of dedicated high-speed rail track owned and managed by Adif. The first line was opened in 1992, connecting the cities of Madrid, Córdoba, and Seville. Unlike the rest of the Spanish broad-gauge network, the AVE uses standard gauge tracks, permitting direct connections outside Spain. Some TGV-derived trains do run on the broad-gauge network at slower speeds, and these are branded separately as Euromed.

On the line from Madrid to Seville, the service guarantees arrival within five minutes of the advertised time, and offers a full refund if the train is delayed further, although only 0.16% of trains have been so. In this regard, the punctuality of the AVE is exceptional compared to other non-long-distance Renfe services. On other AVE lines, this punctuality promise is more lax (15 minutes on the Barcelona line). A possible reason for this is that AVE services slow down to 200 km/h for the Sierra Morena section of the journey because of the tight curves and 250 km/h for the Córdoba-Seville section, possibly on account of medium-speed services running on the line, meaning that they have an easy means of recovering lost time if held up earlier in the journey.

In 2020, access to the Spanish high-speed network was liberalised, and the AVE has since been joined by private competitors Ouigo España and Iryo.

The AVE connects the following cities:

- Madrid – Valencia
- Barcelona – Madrid
- Seville – Madrid
- Ciudad Real – Madrid
- Tarragona – Madrid
- Valladolid – Madrid
- Madrid – Toledo
- Madrid – Cordoba
- Madrid – Murcia

Since the high-speed route between Barcelona to Madrid was launched in 2008, 75% of travelers now choose the train over the airplane, with flight passengers accounting for 25% of travelers.

== Road system ==
Highway network in Spain. The caption reads «Autovía and autopista network - Tolled autopistas - State autopistas and autovías - Autonomic tolled autopistas - Autonomic autopistas and autovías - Insular autovías and autopistas»

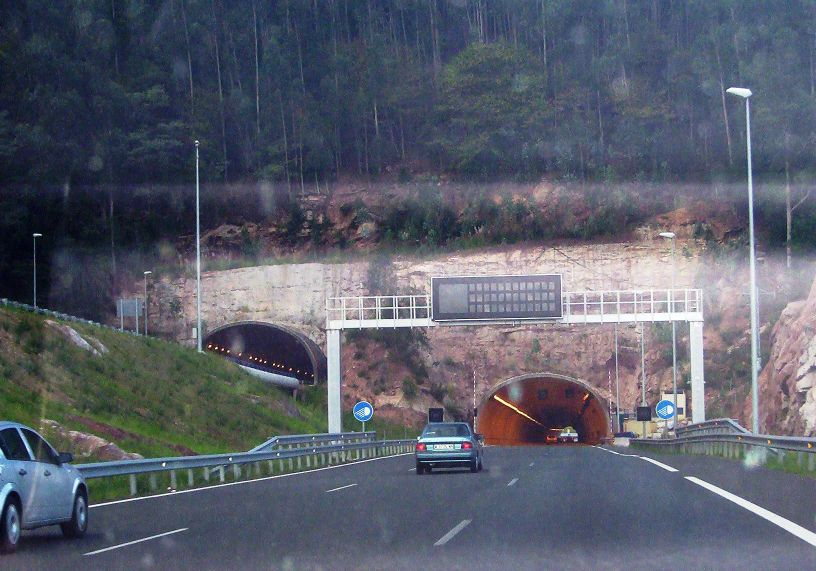
A-67. Autovía de la Meseta (the Meseta Freeway) in Cantabria.

The current vehicle registration plate design.

- Total: 681,298 km (2008)

- Expressways: 17,228 km (2018)

Highways in Spain are divided into "autopista"s and "autovía"s, the former being controlled-access highways. As of 2019, Spain had 12,255 km of roads designated as part of the European comprehensive TEN-T network, of which 10,932 km are motorways. Bridges accounted for 220 km (2.1%) of this network and tunnels for a further 86 km (0.8%).

=== Road safe system ===
For traffic safety per population, Spain is 4th out of 27 EU countries in 2020. There were 32 deaths per million inhabitants in Spain while there were 45 deaths per million in neighbouring France. For traffic safety per registered vehicle, Spain in 3rd out of 23 in 2020.

For the risk of death car occupants are the bigger group of vehicle victims (639 or 38%) but for the risk of serious injuries motorbike is the biggest group of victims (2979 or 37%) in 2020.

== Waterways ==
There are 1,045 km of waterways, but they have minor economic importance.

== Pipelines ==
- Gas: 7,962 km
- Oil: 622 km;
- Refined products: 3,447 km (2006)

== Ports and harbors ==
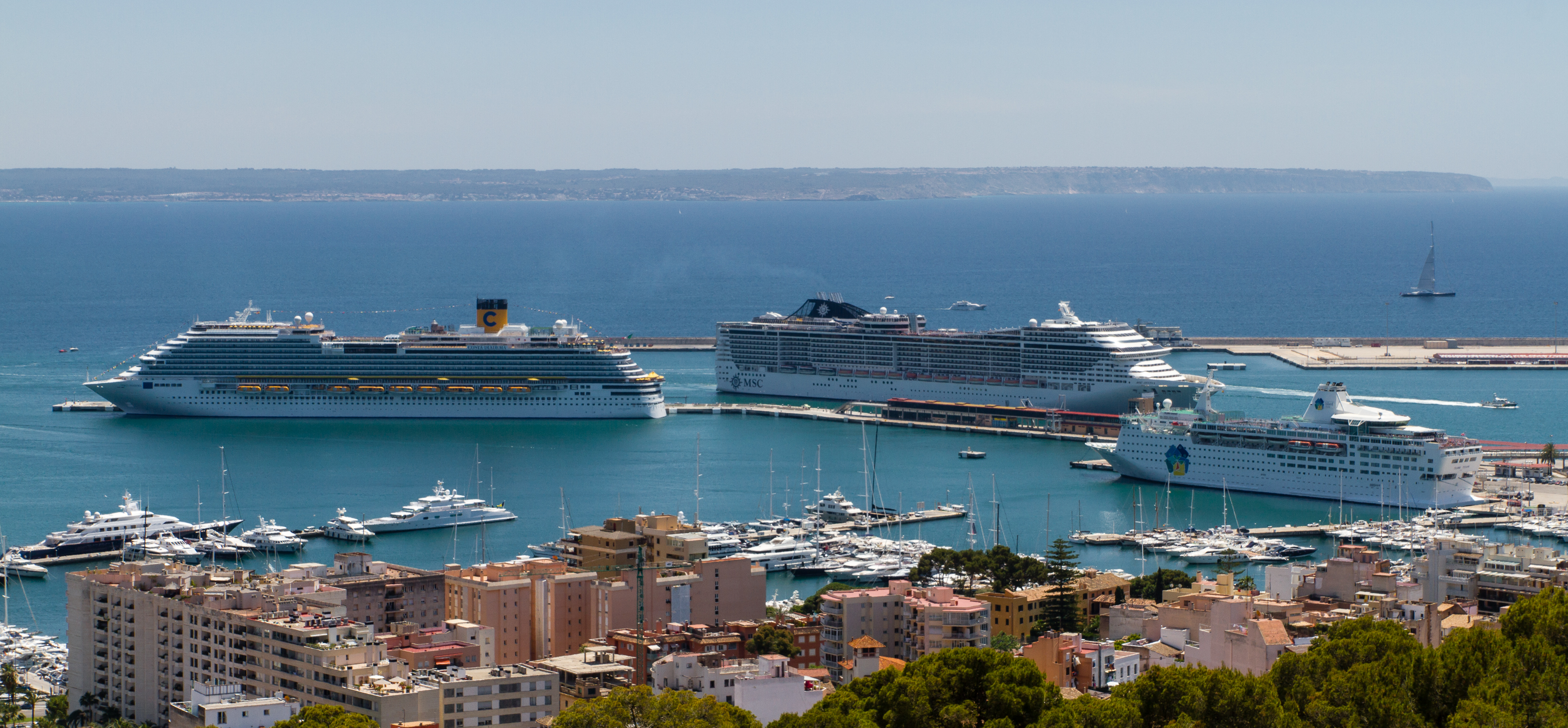
Cruise ships in the port of Palma.

The most important ports and harbours are Algeciras, Barcelona, Valencia, Bilbao and Las Palmas. Other major ports and harbours include Alicante, Almería, Cádiz, Cartagena, A Coruña, Ceuta, Huelva, Málaga, Melilla, Gijón, Palma de Mallorca, Sagunto, Santa Cruz de Tenerife, Los Cristianos (Tenerife), Santander, Tarragona, Vigo, Motril, Seville, Castellón de la Plana, Pasaia, Avilés, and Ferrol.

== Merchant marine ==
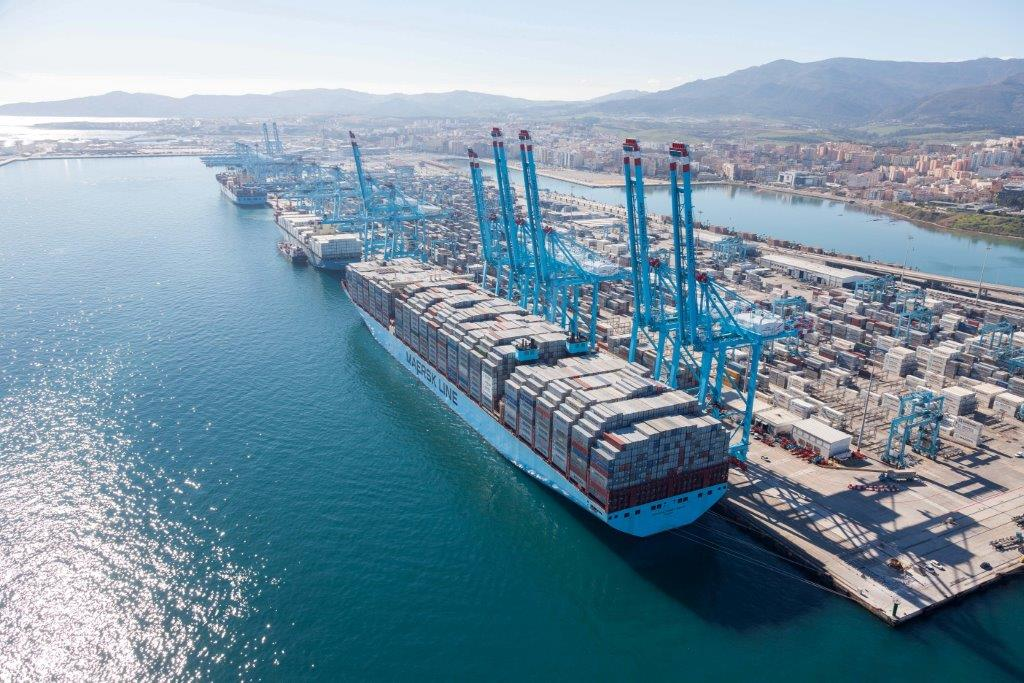
MMM Aerial Port of Algeciras

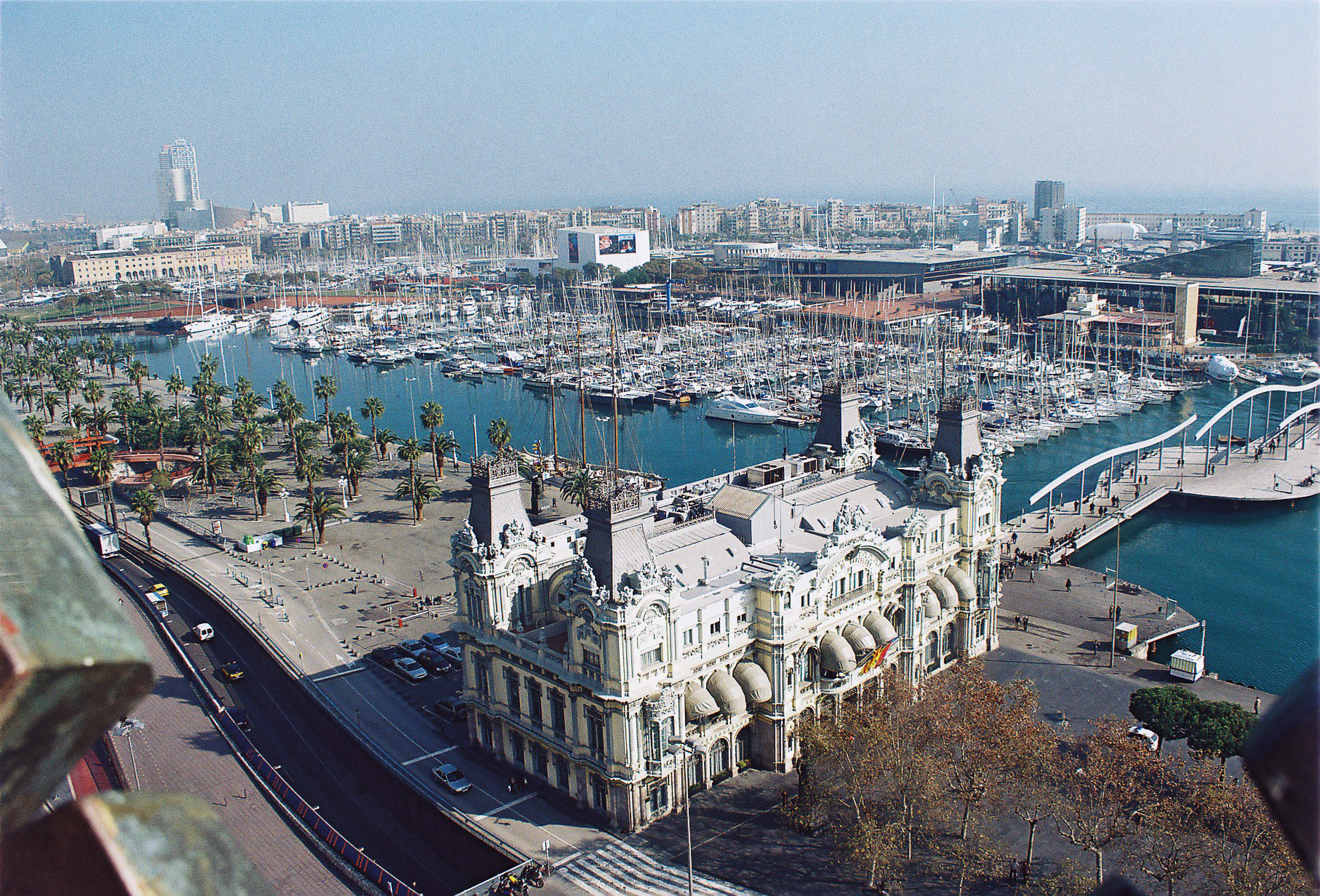
Barcelona, Port Vell.

- Total: 169 ships (1000 GT or over) 1,902,839 GT/1,874,161 tonnes deadweight (DWT)
- Ships by type (2006):

- Bulk carrier: 9
- Cargo: 13
- Chemical tanker: 14
- Container: 27
- Liquefied gas: 9
- Passenger: 1
- Passenger/cargo: 49
- Petroleum tanker: 15
- Refrigerated cargo: 5
- Roll on/roll off: 20
- Specialized tanker: 2
- Vehicle carrier: 5

== Air transport ==
Domestic air transport is in fierce competition with the AVE. For example, the Madrid-Barcelona route was Europe's busiest air route prior to the opening of a high speed rail line in this corridor. Air traffic is also the main mode of transport linking the Balearic and Canary Islands to the mainland.

=== Airports – with paved runways ===
- Total: 96 (2006 est.)

- 10,000 ft (3,048 m) and over: 16
- 8,000 to 9,999 ft (2,438 to 3,047 m): 10
- 5,000 to 7,999 ft (1,524 to 2,437 m): 20
- 3,000 to 4,999 ft (914 to 1,523 m): 24
- under 3,000 ft (914 m): 26

Main airports are Madrid, Barcelona, Palma de Mallorca, Málaga, Gran Canaria, Alicante, and Tenerife South.

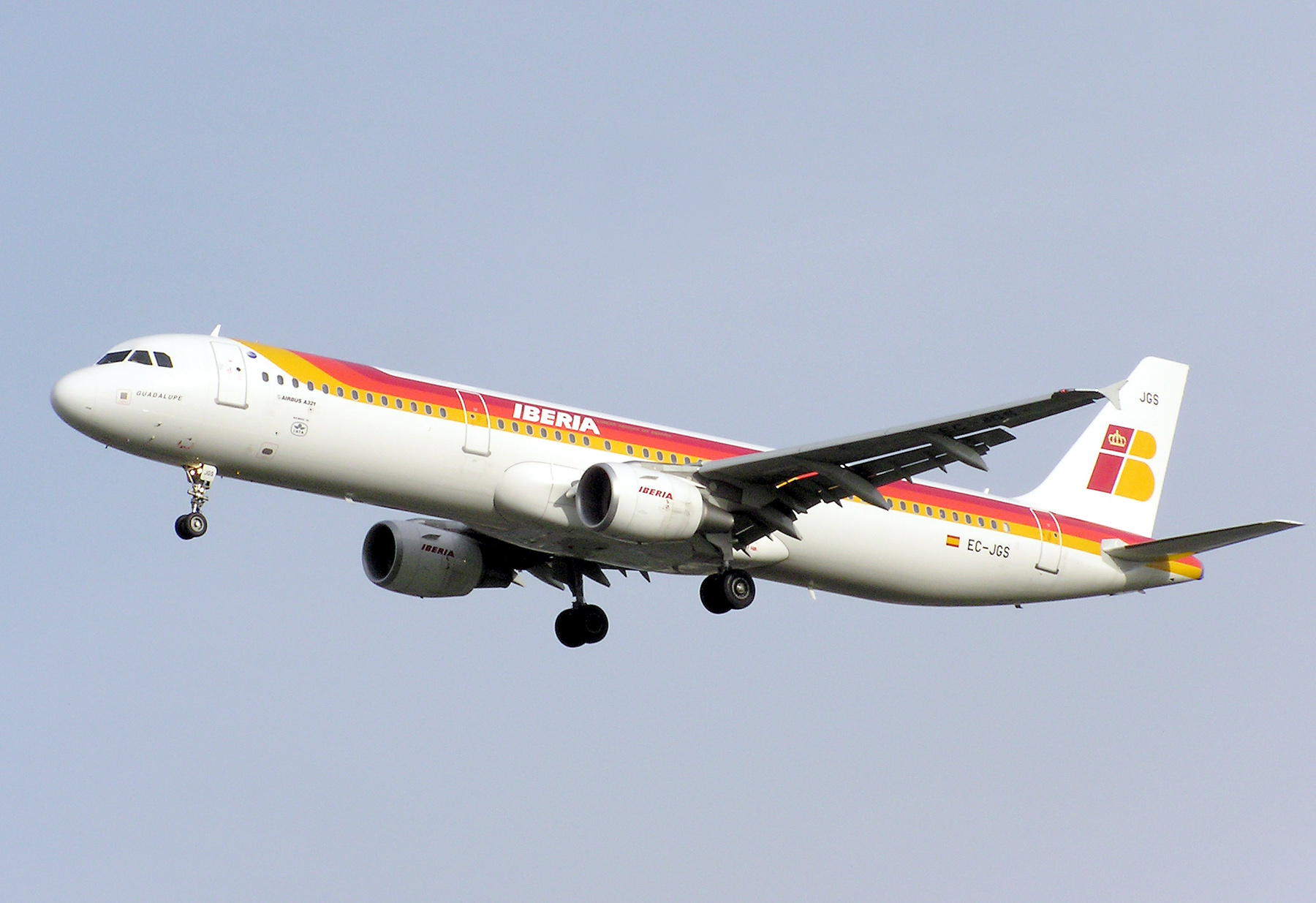
An Airbus A321 of Spanish airline Iberia

=== Airports – with unpaved runways ===
- Total: 61 (2006 est.)

- 5,000 to 7,999 ft (1,524 to 2,437 m): 2
- 3,000 to 4,999 ft (914 to 1,523 m): 15
- under 3,000 ft (914 m): 44

=== Airlines based in Spain ===
- Iberia Airlines
- Air Europa
- Wamos Air
- Vueling Airlines
- Binter Canarias
- Pyrenair
- Islas Airways
- Easyjet

=== Heliports ===
In 2009, there were 298 heliports.

== See also ==
- Plug-in electric vehicles in Spain
