= List of town tramway systems in Spain =

This is a list of town tramway systems in Spain by the autonomous community. It includes all tram systems, past and present. Cities with current operating systems, and those systems themselves, are indicated in bold and blue background colored rows. The use of the diamond (♦) symbol indicates where there were (or are) two or more independent tram systems operating concurrently within a single metropolitan area. Those tram systems that operated on other than standard gauge track (where known) are indicated in the 'Notes' column.

== Andalucia ==
Name of System	Location	Traction Type	Date (From)	Date (To)	Notes
	Cádiz	Mule	18__	?	
	Cádiz	Electric	190_	22 Aug 1964	Reintroduction with planned extension of TramBahia to Plaza España was cancelled .
	**Granada**	Electric	7 Jul 1904	14 Feb 1974	Heritage tramway planned.
Metro de Granada	**Granada**	Electric	21 Sep 2017		New light rail line that functions as a street running tram for much of its route.
Granada–Sierra Nevada railway	♦ Granada – Sierra Nevada	Electric	21 Feb 1925	20 Jan 1974	
Jaén Tram	Jaén	Electric	2 May 2011	May 2011	For the first five months of its operation tram service was to be free, however operations were suspended only about two weeks after system opened, due to a legal challenge from the city's bus operator, Autobuses Castillo, for unfair competition. After length legal difficulties, a contract for the operation of the system was granted in 2026 and operations are expected to begin in 2027.
	Jerez de la Frontera	Mule	13 Apr 1859	1890	
	Málaga	Mule	1881	1903	
	Málaga	Electric	1903	31 Dec 1961	Málaga Metro light metro/light rail system opened 30 July 2014.
	Linares – Baeza	Electric	1 Aug 1904	15 Jan 1966	
	♦ Linares – La Loma	Electric	8 Dec 1907	15 Jan 1966	
	Marmolejo	Mule	1916	Jul 1936	Operated only during spa season.
	Motril	Mule	1884	8 Oct 1922	Gauge: 1000mm (Meter)
	**San Fernando**	Electric	190_	22 Aug 1964	
TramBahia	**San Fernando**	Electric	22 Oct 2022		New line operated as a tram-train system, runs as a tram in San Fernando.
TramBahia	**Chiclana**	Electric	22 Oct 2022		TramBahia runs as a tram in Chiclana
	Sanlúcar de Barrameda	Horse	188_	19__	Operated only during summer season.
	**Seville**	Mule	5 Sep 1887	1899	Gauge: 1000mm (Meter) Transitioned to electric tram. The power plant for the electric trams was built over the old stables.
	**Seville**	Electric	1899	8 May 1960	Gauge: 1000mm (Meter) Replaced by a fleet of Leyland Worldmaster buses from 1959.
MetroCentro	**Seville**	Electric	28 Oct 2007		New line built initially to preserve World Heritage places from direct traffic pollution.
Vélez-Málaga Tram	Vélez-Málaga	Electric	16 Oct 2006	4 Jun 2012	Service suspended in June 2012 because of financial crisis; tram cars subsequently leased to Australia where they began operation in March 2014.

== Aragon ==
Name of System	Location	Traction Type	Date (From)	Date (To)	Notes
	**Zaragoza**	Horse	19 Oct 1885	1903	Gauge: 1,000 mm (3 ft 3 3/8 in)
	**Zaragoza**	Electric	9 Oct 1902	22 Jan 1976	Gauge: 1,000 mm (3 ft 3 3/8 in); 600 V DC Trolley pole. Single, double truck & articulated "boston style"; trailers and open cars used.
Zaragoza tram	**Zaragoza**	Electric	19 Apr 2011		Standard gauge; one line in operation (Mago de Oz–Avenida Academia), and 2 planned lines. Trams model: CAF Urbos 3

== Asturias ==
Name of System	Location	Traction Type	Date (From)	Date (To)	Notes
	Arriondas – Covadonga	Horse	1 Jan 1908	1930	
	Gijón	Mule	30 Mar 1890	1909	
	Gijón	Electric	1909	10 May 1964	
	Mieres	Mule	18__	19__	
	Oviedo	Horse	18__	1922	
	Oviedo	Electric traction	1922	1957	Three lines: 1. Ayuntamiento-Lugones; 2. Colloto-Buenavista; 3. La Argañosa-San Lázaro
	Santullano	Mule	18__	1917	
	Santullano	Steam	1917	28 Sep 1934	
	Avilés	Horse	1892	1924	
	Avilés	Electric	1924	1955(?)	

== Balearic Islands ==
Name of System	Location	Traction Type	Date (From)	Date (To)	Notes
	Alaró – Consell (Mallorca)	Mule	5 May 1881	1922	
	Alaró – Consell (Mallorca)	Petrol	1922	24 Feb 1935	Sporadic operation during 1936–1939.
Trams in Palma	Palma (Mallorca)	Mule	9 Sep 1891	?	
Trams in Palma	Palma (Mallorca)	Steam	?	?	
Trams in Palma	Palma (Mallorca)	Petrol	14 Oct 1921	1940	
Trams in Palma	Palma (Mallorca)	Electric	9 Sep 1891	Jan 1959	Reintroduction planned
Tranvía de Sóller	**Sóller** (Mallorca)	Electric	4 Oct 1913		Gauge: 914 mm (3 ft); This and Barcelona's Tramvia Blau are Spain's only surviving first-generation tramlines.

== Basque Country ==
Name of System	Location	Traction Type	Date (From)	Date (To)	Notes
	Bermeo–Sukarrieta	Horse	1896	1918	Gauge: 750 mm (2 ft 5 1/2 in)
	**Bilbao**	Mule	9 Sep 1876	4 Sep 1909	The interurban Bilbao–Getxo tram opened in 1876, the line from Bilbao to Santurtzi opened in 1882. They were built to a gauge of 1,365 mm (53 3/4 in). These two lines were electrified in 1896. The first urban line in Bilbao opened in 1888 with a 750 mm (2 ft 5 1/2 in) gauge. The urban lines were electrified and regauged to 1,365 mm (53 3/4 in) between 1907 and 1909. The last urban line closed in 1955, the Bilbao–Santurtzi line closed in 1959.
	**Bilbao**	Electric	1 Feb 1896	7 Oct 1959	The interurban Bilbao–Getxo tram opened in 1876, the line from Bilbao to Santurtzi opened in 1882. They were built to a gauge of 1,365 mm (53 3/4 in). These two lines were electrified in 1896. The first urban line in Bilbao opened in 1888 with a 750 mm (2 ft 5 1/2 in) gauge. The urban lines were electrified and regauged to 1,365 mm (53 3/4 in) between 1907 and 1909. The last urban line closed in 1955, the Bilbao–Santurtzi line closed in 1959.
Bilbao tram	**Bilbao**	Electric	18 Dec 2002		Gauge: 1,000 mm (3 ft 3 3/8 in)
Bilbao–Durango–Arratia tram	Bilbao, Basauri, Amorebieta-Etxano, Lemoa, Durango, Igorre, Zeanuri	Electric	2 Sep 1899	30 Nov 1964	Gauge: 1,365 mm (53 3/4 in)
	Donostia / San Sebastián	Mule	18 Jul 1887	1897	
	Donostia / San Sebastián	Electric	1897	11 Jul 1958	Reintroduction planned.
	Irun / Irún - Hondarribia / Fuenterrabía	Mule	1 Nov 1893	1919	
	Irun / Irún - Hondarribia / Fuenterrabía	Electric	1919	18 Jun 1953	
Vitoria-Gasteiz tram	**Vitoria-Gasteiz**	Electric	23 Dec 2008		Gauge: 1,000 mm (3 ft 3 3/8 in)

== Canary Islands ==
Name of System	Location	Traction Type	Date (From)	Date (To)	Notes
	Las Palmas (de Gran Canaria)	Steam	1891	1910	Gauge: 1,000 mm (3 ft 3 3/8 in)
	Las Palmas (de Gran Canaria)	Electric	1910	1935	Operation restored with steam traction, one steam locomotive pulling trains of tramcars, 1940–1941. Reintroduction planned.
	**(Santa Cruz de) Tenerife**	Steam / Electric	8 Apr 1901	1956	Gauge: 1,200 mm (3 ft 11 1/4 in)(?)
Tenerife Tram	**(Santa Cruz de) Tenerife**	Electric	2 Jun 2007		

== Cantabria ==
Name of System	Location	Traction Type	Date (From)	Date (To)	Notes
	Santander	Steam	1873	1875	
	Santander	Horse	1875	1908	
	Santander	Electric	1908	11 Jul 1951	

== Castile and León ==
Name of System	Location	Traction Type	Date (From)	Date (To)	Notes
Trams in Valladolid	Valladolid	Mule	22 Dec 1881	18 Apr 1911	
Trams in Valladolid	Valladolid	Electric	7 Sep 1910	6 Nov 1933	

== Catalonia ==
Name of System	Location	Traction Type	Date (From)	Date (To)	Notes
Trams in Barcelona	**Barcelona**	Mule	26 Jun 1872	1907	
Trams in Barcelona	**Barcelona**	Steam	1877	1907	
Trams in Barcelona	**Barcelona**	Electric	26 Jan 1899	19 Mar 1971	Note: Closure date does not include the Tramvia Blau line.
Tramvia Blau	**Barcelona**	Electric	29 Oct 1901		
Trambaix	**Barcelona**	Electric	5 April 2004		
Trambesòs	**Barcelona**	Electric	8 May 2004		
	♦ Arrabassada	Electric	19 Jul 1911	1938	
	♦ Mataró – Argentona	Electric	27 May 1928	9 Oct 1965	
	♦ Montgat – Tiana	Electric	1 Nov 1916	30 Sep 1955	
	Tarragona	Mule	9 Apr 1883	13 Jan 1896	
	Tortosa – Roquetes	Mule	20 Sep 1885	1928	

== Extremadura ==
Name of System	Location	Traction Type	Date (From)	Date (To)	Notes
	Badajoz	Horse	19 Mar 1889	22 July 1929	Gauge: 1,000 mm (3 ft 3+3/8 in)

== Galicia ==
Name of System	Location	Traction Type	Date (From)	Date (To)	Notes
	A Coruña (La Coruña)	Mule	1 Jan 1903	1913	
	A Coruña (La Coruña)	Electric	1913	Jul 1962	
	A Coruña (La Coruña)	Electric	Dec 1997	16 Dec 2020	
	Ferrol	Electric	?	1962	
	Pontevedra	Steam	12 Jun 1889	1924	
	Pontevedra	Electric	1924	1943	
	Verín	Mule	1909	192_	
	Vigo	Electric	10 Aug 1914	30 Dec 1968	

== Madrid ==
Name of System	Location	Traction Type	Date (From)	Date (To)	Notes
	El Escorial	(Electric)	-	-	Construction started 1929, not completed.
Parla Tram	Parla	Electric	6 May 2007	-	
Trams in Madrid	**Madrid**	Mule	31 May 1871	?	
Trams in Madrid	**Madrid**	Steam	1878	?	
Trams in Madrid	**Madrid**	Electric	1898	1 Jun 1972	
Metro Ligero	**Madrid**	Electric	24 May 2007		**Light rail**

== Region of Murcia ==
Name of System	Location	Traction Type	Date (From)	Date (To)	Notes
	Cartagena	Mule	Sep 1892	1907	
	Cartagena	Electric	1907	1959	Gauge: 1,000 mm (3 ft 3 3/8 in)
	**Murcia**	Mule	Oct 1896	1902	
	**Murcia**	Steam	1902	1906	
	**Murcia**	Electric	1906	29 Apr 1929	
Murcia tram	**Murcia**	Electric	29 Apr 2007		

== Navarre ==
Name of System	Location	Traction Type	Date (From)	Date (To)	Notes
	Pamplona	Electric	23 Sep 1911	?	

== Valencian Community ==
Name of System	Location	Traction Type	Date (From)	Date (To)	Notes
	Alcoi	(Electric)	-	-	Construction started 1895, not completed.
Trams in Alicante	**Alicante**	Mule	13 Jul 1893	1902	
Trams in Alicante	**Alicante**	Steam	1902	1924	
Trams in Alicante	**Alicante**	Electric	1924	14 Nov 1969	
Alicante Tram	**Alicante**	Electric	15 Aug 2003		Gauge: 1,000 mm (3 ft 3 3/8 in); Tram trial service began 17 March 1999; full service inaugurated 15 August 2003.
	Carcaixent - Dénia	Mule	8 Feb 1864	28 Nov 1881	Line upgraded from tramway to railway.
	Novelda	(Electric)			Construction started, not completed.
Trams in Valencia	**Valencia**	Mule	23 Jun 1876	1925	
Trams in Valencia	**Valencia**	Steam	1892	?	
Trams in Valencia	**Valencia**	Electric	1900	20 Jun 1970	
Metrovalencia	**Valencia**	Electric	21 May 1994		Gauge: 1,000 mm (3 ft 3 3/8 in); Line 4 (tramway) opened in May 1994. Metrovalencia is a metre gauge system of tram, light rail, and even commuter rail, albeit with underground metro-like (subway) sections.
	♦ Burriana / Borriana - Grao / Grau	Mule	?	19__	
	♦Villanueva de Castellón - La Pobla Llarga	Mule	1 Mar 1896	?	
	♦Villanueva de Castellón - La Pobla Llarga	Steam	1919; 1926	1926; 1931	Line upgraded from tramway to railway.

== See also ==
- Trams in Spain
- List of town tramway systems in Europe
- List of tram and light rail transit systems
- List of metro systems
- List of trolleybus systems in Spain
