= Euskotren Tranbia =

Tram system in Bilbao and Vitoria-Gasteiz, Spain

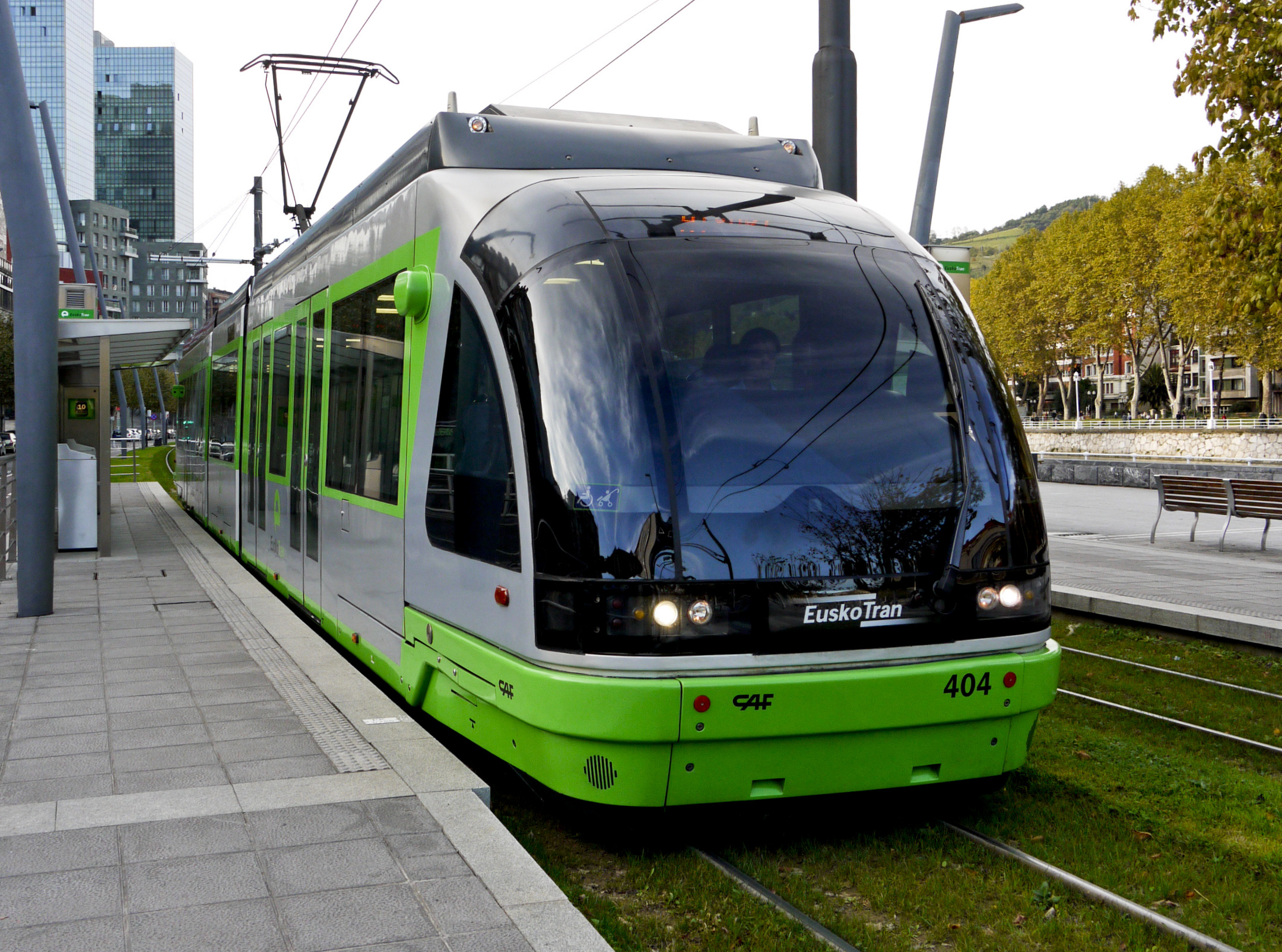
- A 400 series tram in Bilbao.

Overview
- Locale: Bilbao, Vitoria-Gasteiz (Basque Country)
- Transit type: Tram
- Annual ridership: 3 million (Bilbao, 2018); 8 million (Vitoria-Gasteiz, 2018)
- Headquarters: 8, Atxuri Street, Bilbao, Biscay; 2, General Álava, Vitoria-Gasteiz, Álava
- Website: www.euskotren.eus/en/tranvia

Operation
- Began operation: 2002 (Bilbao); 2008 (Vitoria-Gasteiz)
- Operator: Euskotren

Technical
- Track gauge: 1,000 mm (3 ft 3 3/8 in) metre gauge
- Electrification: 750 V DC overhead catenary

Euskotren Tranbia (Note: Formerly known as EuskoTran, short for Eusko Tranbia. In 2012, the commercial brand changed from EuskoTran to Euskotren Tranbia, with the word tranbia being Basque for "tram".) is the brand under which the tramway networks in the cities of Vitoria-Gasteiz and Bilbao (both in the Basque Country) are run. The system in Bilbao started operations in 2002, and the one in Vitoria-Gasteiz in 2008. It is one of the four commercial divisions under which Euskotren (a public company managed by the Basque Government) operates. The infrastructure is owned by the public entity Euskal Trenbide Sarea (Basque Railway Network) and tracks use 1,000 mm (3 ft 3 3/8 in) narrow gauge.

== Services ==
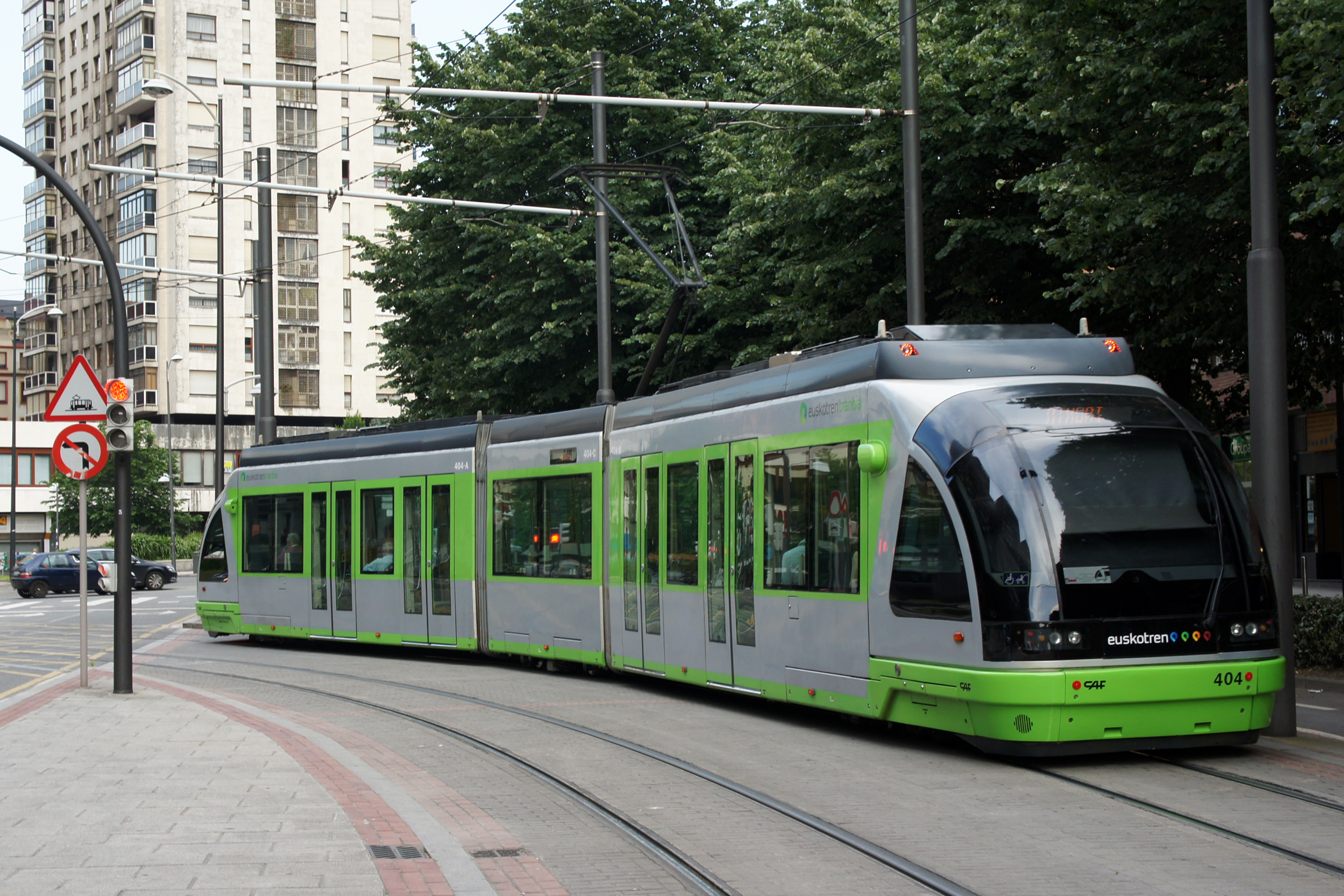
Tram in Bilbao.

Euskotren Tranbia operates tram networks in Vitoria-Gasteiz (province of Álava) and Bilbao (province of Biscay). The first network, then named EuskoTran started operations in Bilbao in 2002 after two years under construction, connecting Bilbao-Atxuri Station with Uribitarte. The line was eventually expanded to the Guggenheim Museum Bilbao, Basurto Hospital and finally La Casilla.

The tramway system in Vitoria-Gasteiz opened in 2008 and has a Y-shaped network, with two different lines that cross the city from south to north.

Trams run on the street (shared with other traffic or on dedicated tracks) and on grass tracks. It also shares dedicated lanes with the local bus services, TUVISA in Vitoria-Gasteiz and Bilbobus in Bilbao.

=== Stop design ===
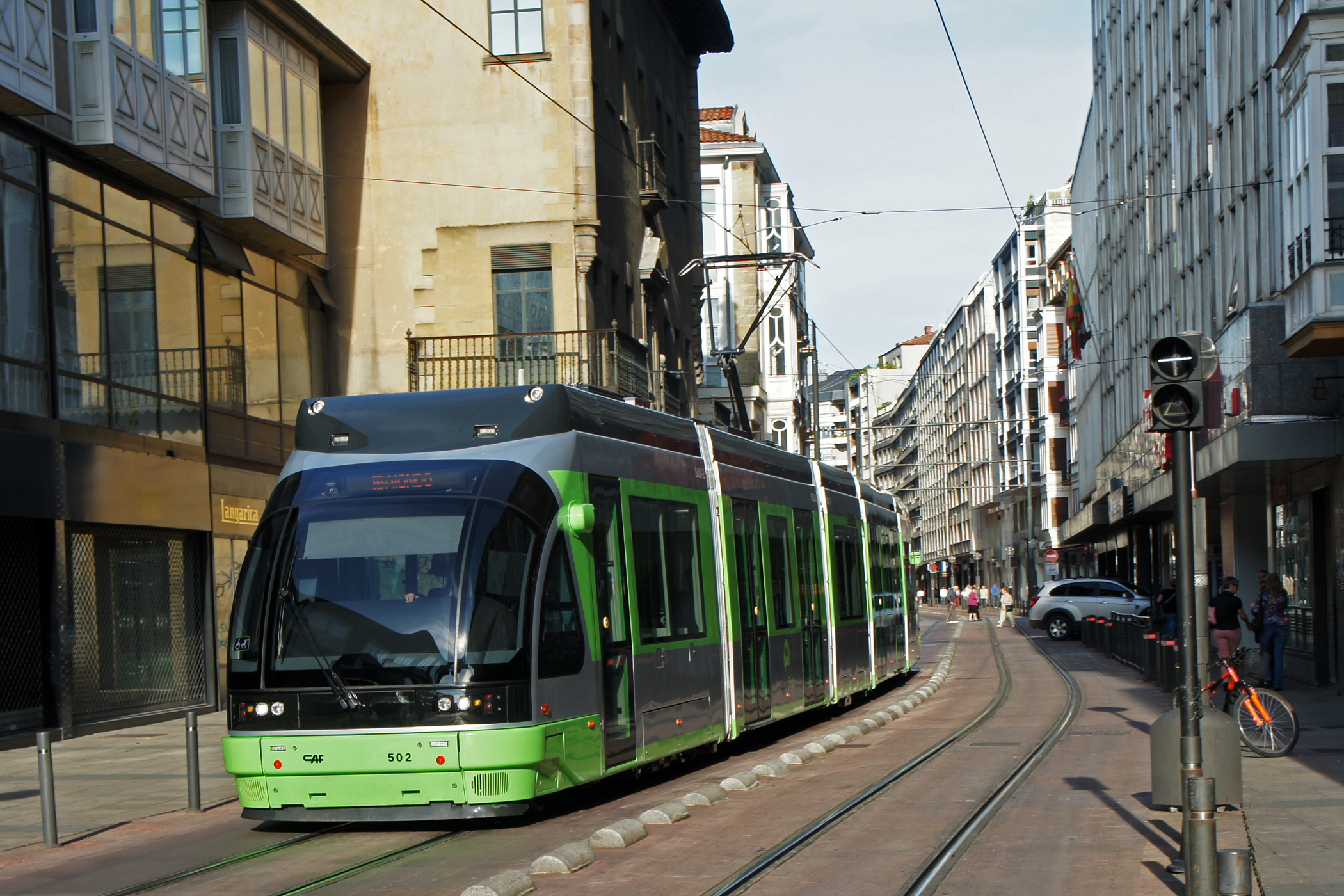
Tram unit in Vitoria-Gasteiz.

The two tram systems have their own, distinguishable stops, some of them shared with bus systems and with low platforms. The stops of Atxuri, Ribera and Abando, all of them in Bilbao, do not have a dedicated platform, they use the sidewalk. Except for Atxuri, all stops are unstaffed and rely on automated ticket machines. All the stations have displays and screens with the network map, the current time and temperature and the frequencies. Due to the low platforms, the access between them involves crossing the tracks by pedestrian level crossing. They are virtually level with the doors and are all wider than 2 m (6.6 ft). This allows wheelchairs, prams, pushchairs and the elderly to board the tram easily with no steps. In street sections, the pavement is integrated with the tram stop. The system in Bilbao has 14 stops, while the one in Vitoria has 23.

=== Systems ===
The service was formerly branded as EuskoTran.

=== Fares and ticketing ===
The two systems use both regular paper tickets and smartcards (BAT, Barik and Mugi). There are single, daily and monthly tickets available. In both networks, ticket pricing is not based on zone-based rules, as there's a unique fare for the whole of each network.

== Rolling stock ==
Euskotren Tranbia operates a fleet of 26 CAF Urbos trams, distributed between both networks.

=== Current fleet ===
Class	Image	Number	Network	In service	Notes
400 series (CAF Urbos 1)		8	Bilbao	2002–present	
500 series (CAF Urbos 2)		11	Bilbao, Vitoria-Gasteiz	2008–present	3 in Bilbao; 8 in Vitoria-Gasteiz
600 series (CAF Urbos 3)		7	Vitoria-Gasteiz	2020–present	

The 400 series consists of 8 vehicles (numbered 401-408), built for the Bilbao network. The trams are 24.4 m (80 ft) long, have 70% low floor access and are made up of three cars. Each tram can carry 196 passengers. They are the only CAF Urbos 1 trams to have been built.

The 500 series consists of 11 vehicles (numbered 501-511), originally built for the Vitoria-Gasteiz network. The trams are 31.4 m (103 ft) long, have 100% low floor access and are made up of five cars. Each tram can carry 261 passengers. Due to the introduction of the larger 600 series in Vitoria-Gasteiz, three vehicles will be transferred to Bilbao.

The 600 series consists of 7 vehicles (numbered 601-607), built for the Vitoria-Gasteiz network. The trams are 44.2 m (145 ft) long, have 100% low floor access and are made up of seven cars. Each tram can carry 398 passengers.

=== Livery ===
The trams were originally painted in grey and green stripes, the colours of Euskotren Tranbia. The current livery is white and green.

== Shelved projects ==
=== Barakaldo tram ===
There were plans to create a tram network in the municipality of Barakaldo, in the Greater Bilbao area, which would have started in Urbinaga (where it would have been connected to the Leioa tram) and from there create a circular line around the city center. The project included fifteen stops within Barakaldo plus two in Sestao, where it would connect with the Leioa line. Even if this project hasn't been officially canceled, no progress has been made since 2010.

=== Leioa tram ===
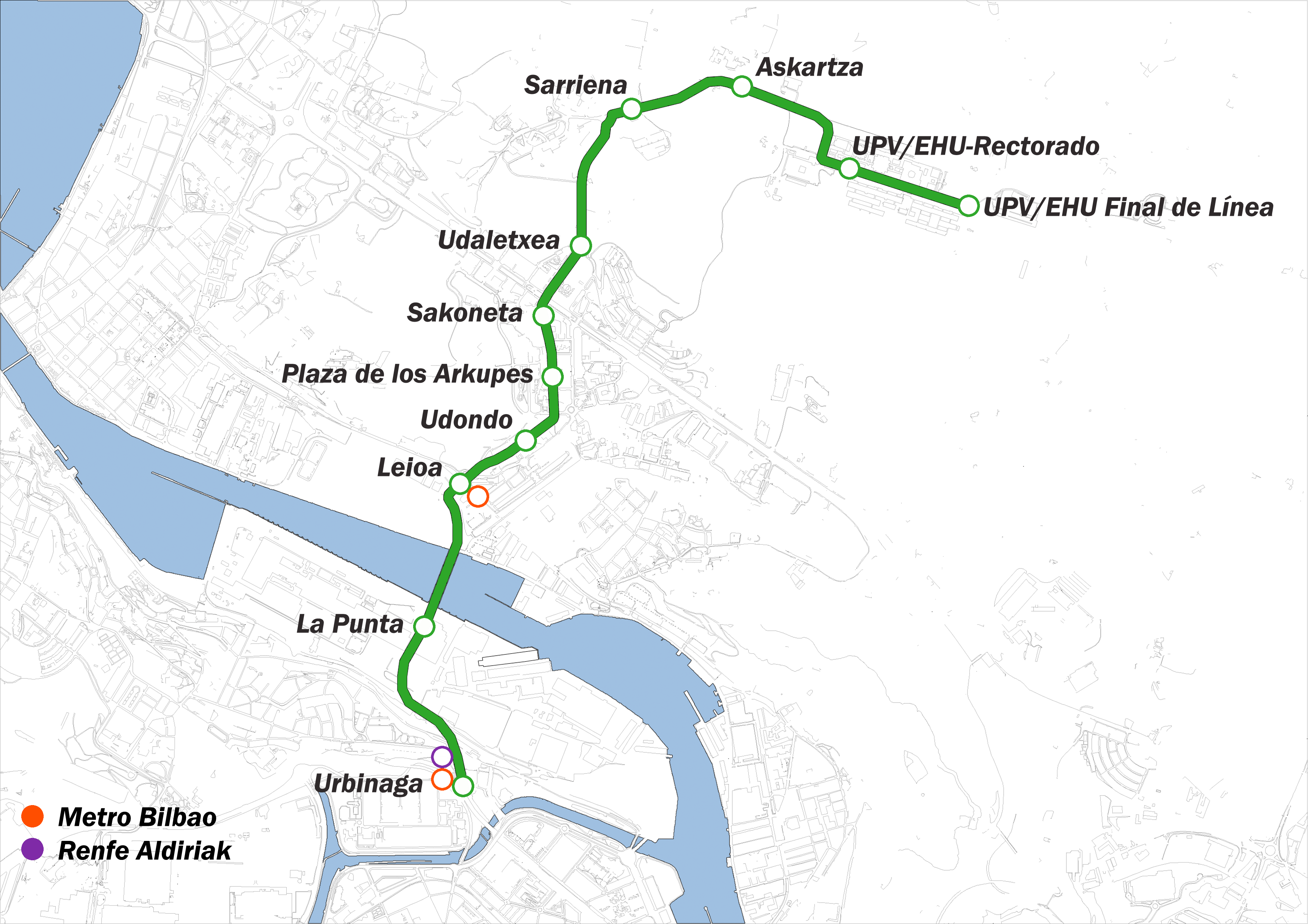
The proposed Leioa tram.

The construction of a tramway for the municipality of Leioa, in the Greater Bilbao area had two phases. The first phase consisted in the construction of the depot and offices. The second phase would have involved the line itself including the rail track and stops from the University of the Basque Country campus to downtown Leioa. It would have included nine stops. A third phase would have made the tramway cross the Estuary of Bilbao and connect Leioa with the Left Bank with two extra stations.

Only the first phase (the depot and offices) has been built. After being postponed several times, the project was shelved in 2018.

== See also ==
- Euskotren Trena
