= TUVISA =

Company responsible for urban transport in Vitoria-Gasteiz, Spain

Transportes Urbanos de Vitoria
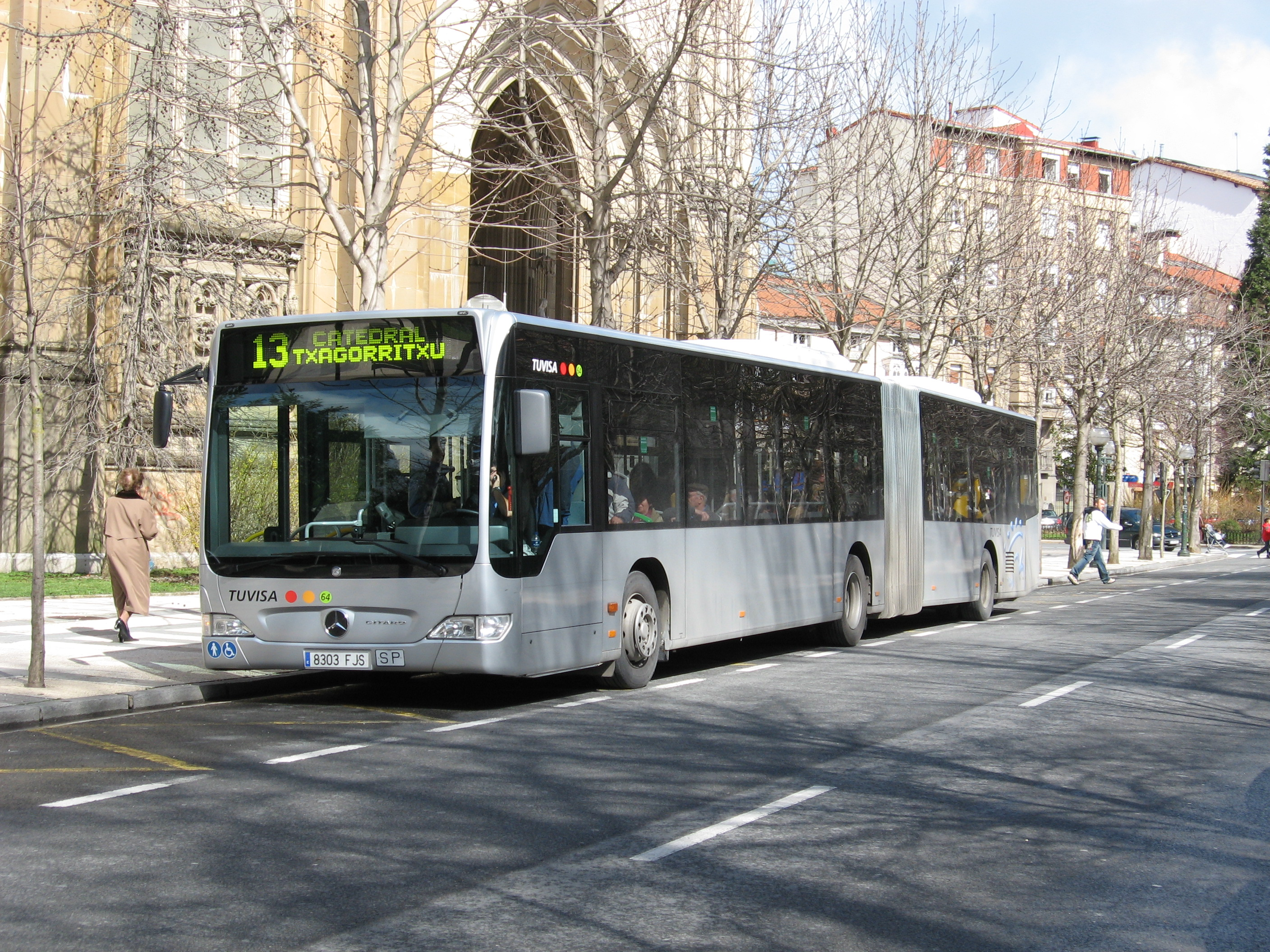
- A bus of the company in 2007
- Founded: 1967
- Locale: Vitoria-Gasteiz, Álava, Basque Country, Spain
- Service type: bus service
- Routes: 15
- Fleet: 97
- Annual ridership: 17.8 million (2024)
- Website: www.vitoria-gasteiz.org/tuvisa

TUVISA (Spanish pronunciation: [tuˈβisa]; short for Transportes Urbanos de Vitoria, S.A.) is the municipal company responsible for urban transport in the city of Vitoria-Gasteiz, in the north of Spain. As of March 2022, the company operates 97 buses.

== History ==
On 30 October 2009, the whole network was reorganized, resulting in a lower number of lines operating with shorter headways. The reorganization of the network was suggested by the Plan de Movilidad Sostenible, 'Sustainable Mobility Plan', aimed at improving traffic and mobility in the city. In October 2010, some changes to the network were made, with additional changes in September 2012 and February 2013. A tenth line was added to the network in 2015.

== Routes ==
- L1 Circular
- BEI
- L3 Betoño-Zumaquera
- L4 Lakua-Mariturri
- L5 Salburua-Elejalde
  - L5a Salburua-Elejalde-Astegieta
  - L5b Salburua-Elejalde-Jundiz (Ariñez)
  - L5c Salburua-Elejalde-Jundiz itv
- L6 Zabalgana-Arkaiate
- L7 Borinbizkarra-Salburua
- L8 Unibertsitatea
- L9 Gamarra-Zumaquera
- L10 Aldaia-Larrein

=== Night routes ===
These lines, known as Gautxori, operate in Friday and Saturday nights.

- G1 Lakua-Abetxuko
- G2 Adurtza-Salburua
- G3 Armentia-Zabalgana
- G4 Sansomendi-Lakua
- G6 Salburua-Aranbizkarra

== See also ==
- Vitoria-Gasteiz tram
