= Grupo Ruiz =

Spanish holding company

- Type: Private
- Industry: Transportation, Mobility, Energy
- Founded: 1890
- Founder: Mariano Ruiz
- Headquarters: Madrid, Spain
- Area served: Spain, Portugal, Morocco
- Key people: Andrés Ruiz Vargas-Machuca (CEO)
- Products: Urban transport, Metropolitan transport, Staff transport, Clean energy solutions, Digital mobility platforms (COPI, Busme)
- Services: Passenger mobility, Fleet management, Energy management
- Number of employees: 3,200+
- Subsidiaries: Empresa Ruiz, Empresa Martín, Salamanca de Transportes, Auto Periferia, Tubasa, Transporte Urbano de Linares, Unión de Autobuses Urbanos, CTM, Unauto, Autasa Transport Touristique, Vanwardia, and others
- Website: gruporuiz.com

Grupo Ruiz is a Spanish holding company specializing in passenger mobility. Originally established as Empresa Ruiz, S.A., it has evolved over more than 130 years into an international transport group with operations in Spain, Portugal, and Morocco.

Grupo Ruiz manages urban, metropolitan, and intercity transport services and invests in sustainable energy generation and digital mobility technologies.

== History ==
Grupo Ruiz was founded in 1890 in Madrid, Spain, by Mariano Ruiz, who operated a horse-drawn goods stagecoach between Madrid and Arganda del Rey. In 1900, the company introduced its first passenger bus, beginning its public transport operations. By 1950, Grupo Ruiz expanded to the outskirts of Madrid, including Leganés and Fuenlabrada. In 1986, the company extended its services to Salamanca, followed later by Toledo and Badajoz.

In 1996, Grupo Ruiz became the first company in Spain to operate buses powered by Compressed natural gas (CNG). The year 2000 marked the start of international operations in Morocco. In 2005, the company created Transporte Urbano de Linares, S.L. in Andalusia. Grupo Ruiz began operations in Murcia in 2013, and in 2018, it acquired Auto Periferia, S.A., expanding its national presence. In 2019, the company introduced electric buses in northwest Madrid and Mallorca and entered Portugal through Empresa Martín (Cascais), S.A.

By 2023, Grupo Ruiz eliminated diesel bus acquisitions, achieving 80% sustainability in its Spanish fleet. In 2025, Linares became the first Andalusian city with a 100% electric public transport fleet. In 2025, its pilot project for an autonomous bus in Leganés, developed with the Community of Madrid, the Consorcio Regional de Transportes, and Karsan, was recognized by Actualidad Económica as one of the 100 Best Ideas of the Year.

== Operations ==
Grupo Ruiz manages a fleet of over 1,100 vehicles, distributed as 690 in Spain, 96 in Portugal, and 368 in Morocco. The group includes 18 entities, including Empresa Ruiz, Empresa Martín, Salamanca de Transportes, Auto Periferia, Tubasa, Transporte Urbano de Linares, Unión de Autobuses Urbanos, CTM, Unauto, Autasa Transport Touristique, and Vanwardia, its technology subsidiary. The group provides comprehensive passenger mobility services across Spain, Portugal, and Morocco. Its main activities include:

- Urban transport: operating bus services in eight Spanish cities, including Madrid, Toledo, Salamanca, Badajoz, La Rinconada, Linares, Murcia, and Mallorca.
- Metropolitan transport: managing 50 lines across 24 metropolitan areas, with a strong presence in the Madrid region and Lisbon’s metropolitan area (Cascais, Estoril, and Paredes).
- International operations: in Morocco, the company operates over 650 staff transport routes for multinational corporations, serving more than five million passengers annually, including services in the port of Tangier.
- Energy division: dedicated to clean energy generation, management, and supply for the company’s operations.
- Digital services: development of smart mobility platforms, including COPI ("Mobility as a Service") and Busme, an on-demand transport application. The company primarily serves public transport authorities, multinational clients, and urban consortia, including the Consorcio Regional de Transportes de Madrid.

== Social responsibility ==
Grupo Ruiz collaborates with the Atabal Foundation, supporting social projects in Sierra Leone, El Salvador, Peru, Nigeria, and Sahrawi refugee camps. Initiatives include training programs for women and the donation of buses for vulnerable communities. In Spain, in cooperation with the association APAMEX (Badajoz), Grupo Ruiz runs a Special Employment Center employing more than 30 people with disabilities.
