= Borinbizkarra =

Coordinates: 42.8500°N 2.6972°W

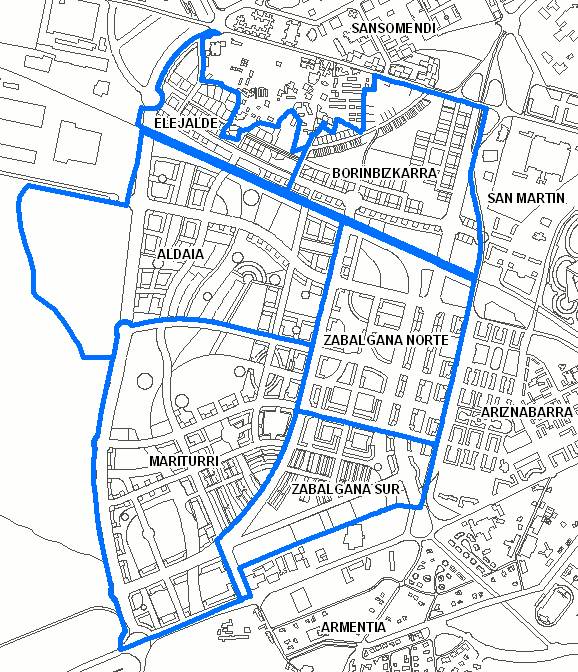
Borinbizkarra

Borinbizkarra is a sector located to the northeast of the District of Zabalgana, in the city of Vitoria, Basque country, Spain. Borinbizkarra has an area of 343.505 square meters.

It borders north with the District of Sansomendi through the Avenida de los Huetos, to the East with the District of San Martín through the Avenida del Mediterraneo, to the South

with the rest of Zabalgana via railroad and to the West with the sector of Elejalde and the village of Ali.

This sector is built around a large central park, around which are the streets, buildings and equipment.

2,000 homes are planned: 1568 (78,40%) of official protection, free collective 344 and 88 townhouses, being the third sector of Zabalgana by number of dwellings.

Plots for equipment a total of 60.922 square meters, divided into 9 plots: 5 for educational facilities, 2 for sports facilities, one for social facilities and another for equipment in general, but has been modified to the detriment of the residents.
