= List of trolleybus systems in Spain =

This is a list of trolleybus systems in Spain by autonomous community. It includes all trolleybus systems, past and present.

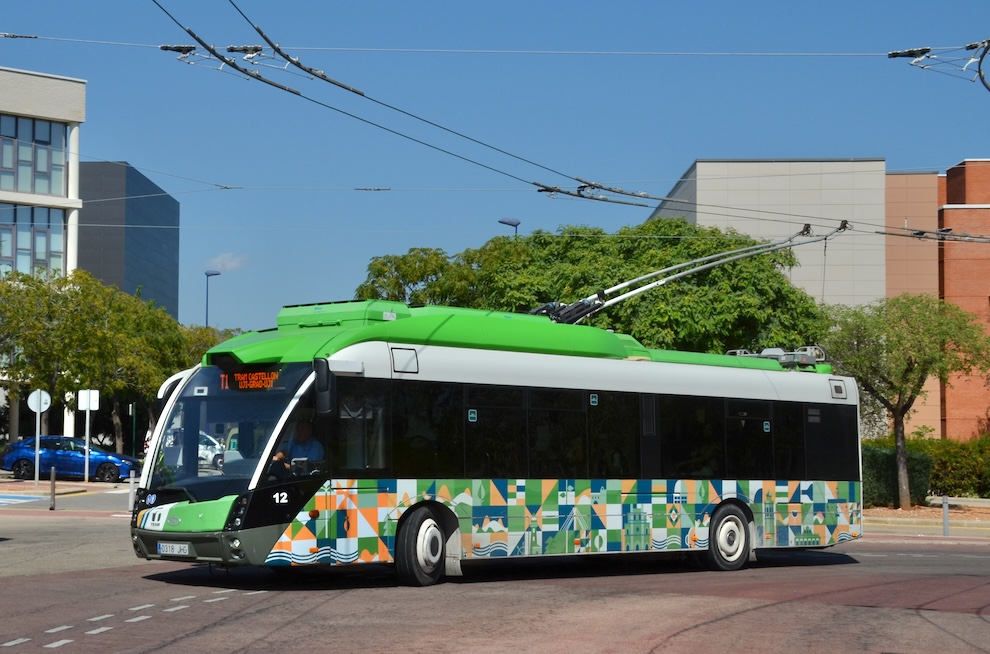
A trolleybus in Castellón de la Plana, 2024

== Andalusia ==
Name of System	Location	Date (From)	Date (To)	Notes
	Cádiz	1951	1974	

== Aragon ==
Name of System	Location	Date (From)	Date (To)	Notes
	Zaragoza	8 May 1951	9 October 1975	

== Basque Country ==
Name of System	Location	Date (From)	Date (To)	Notes
	Bilbo / Bilbao	20 June 1940	28 October 1978	
	♦ Bilbo/Bilbao – Algorta	1949	1965	Interurban
	Donostia / San Sebastián	19 July 1948	24 December 1973	
	♦ San Sebastián – Tolosa	6 June 1947	11 July 1968	Interurban

== Cantabria ==
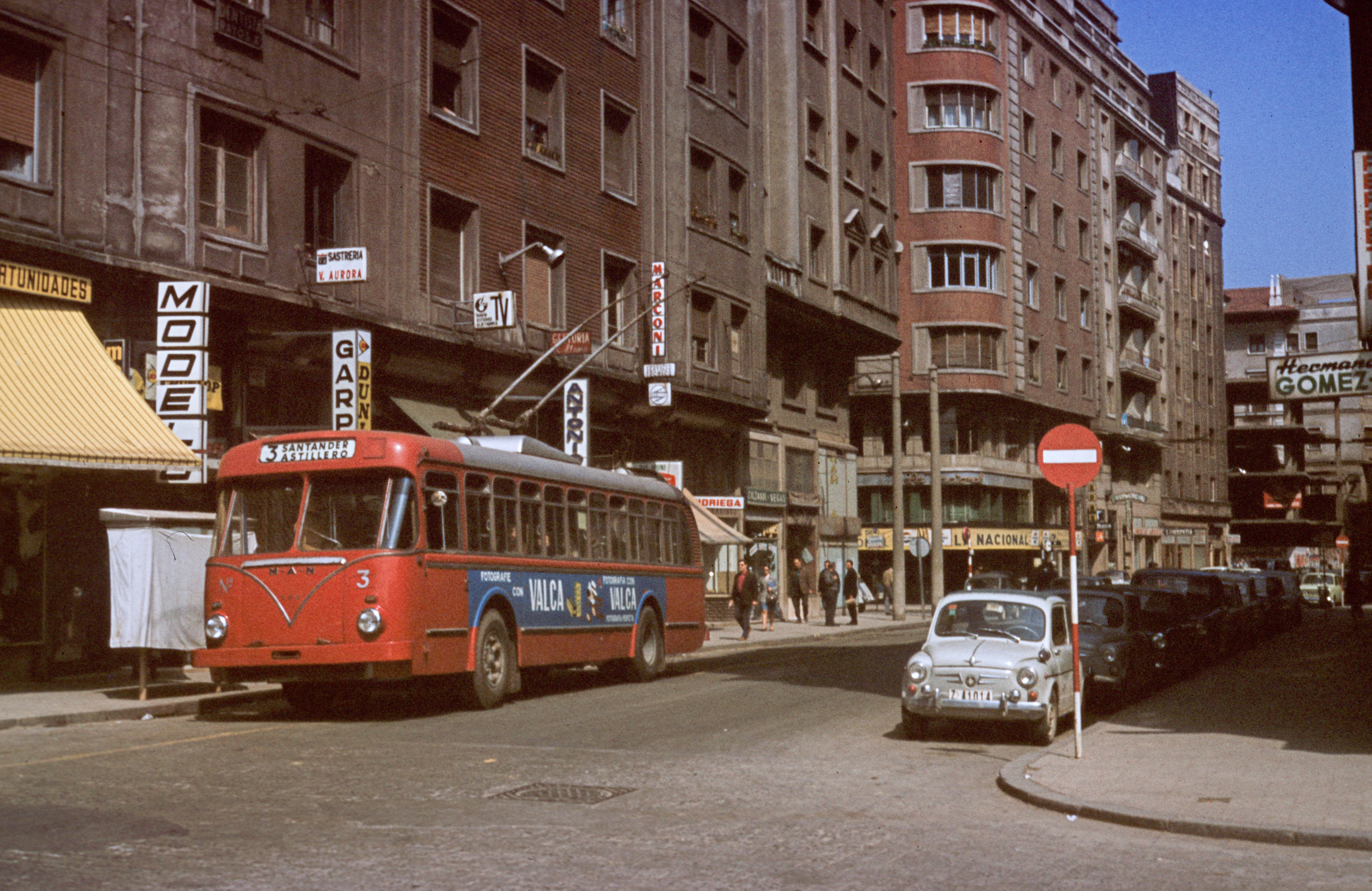
A trolleybus on the interurban Santander–Astillero system in 1969

Name of System	Location	Date (From)	Date (To)	Notes
	Santander	1951	25 February 1975	
	♦ Santander – Astillero	17 July 1955	August 1975	Interurban

== Catalonia ==
Name of System	Location	Date (From)	Date (To)	Notes
	Barcelona	7 October 1941	7 October 1968	
	Tarragona	2 October 1952	March 1973	

== Galicia ==
Name of System	Location	Date (From)	Date (To)	Notes
	A Coruña	26 July 1948	4 January 1979	
	A Coruña – Carballo	March 1950	15 March 1971	Interurban
	Pontevedra	15 December 1943	31 August 1989	

== Madrid ==
Name of System	Location	Date (From)	Date (To)	Notes
	Madrid	8 April 1950	30 April 1966	

== Valencia ==
Name of System	Location	Date (From)	Date (To)	Notes
	Castellón de la Plana	1961 25 June 2008	1966 -	See Trolleybuses in Castellón de la Plana.
	Valencia	18 July 1951	21 May 1976	

== See also ==
- List of trolleybus systems, for all other countries
- List of town tramway systems in Spain
- List of light-rail transit systems
- List of rapid transit systems
- Trolleybus usage by country

== Sources ==
=== Books and periodicals ===
- Murray, Alan. 2000. '"World Trolleybus Encyclopaedia" (ISBN 0-904235-18-1). Reading, Berkshire, UK: Trolleybooks.
- Peschkes, Robert. 1993. "World Gazetteer of Tram, Trolleybus, and Rapid Transit Systems, Part Three: Europe" (ISBN 0-948619-01-5). London: Rapid Transit Publications.
- Trolleybus Magazine (ISSN 0266-7452). National Trolleybus Association (UK). Bimonthly.
