= Jaén Tram =

Tramway system in Jaén, Spain

Jaén Tramway

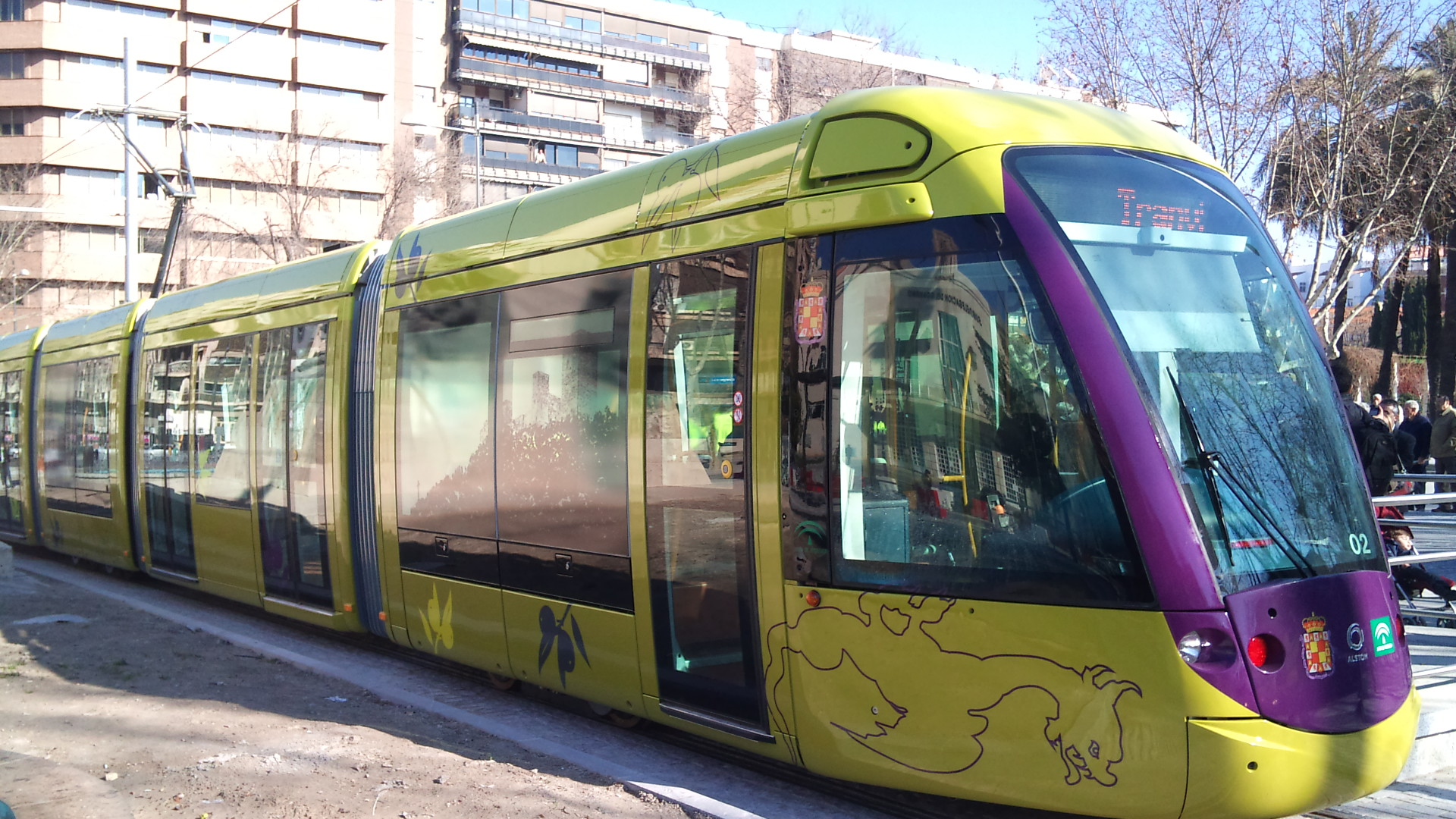
- A tram in Jaén during testing in February 2011

Overview
- Native name: Tranvía de Jaén
- Locale: Jaén, Andalucía, Spain
- Transit type: Tram

Operation
- Began operation: 3 May 2011, but ceased operation only about 2 weeks later
- Operation will start: Late 2026 (reopening)

The Jaén Tramway (Spanish: Tranvía de Jaén) is a tramway system constructed in the city of Jaén, Spain (Andalusia), which was built in 2009–2011 but operated only very briefly for passenger service before being suspended for 15 years due to a lack of financing for operations. Following its rehabilitation, its inauguration is expected in late 2026.

== History ==
Work began in 2009, and five low-floor Alstom Citadis trams were acquired second-hand from Madrid in 2010. The completed line was ceremonially inaugurated on 2 May 2011, and limited free "trial service" began on 3 May 2011. However, that service operated for only a little more than two weeks and was then suspended, "due to a political dispute about withdrawal of competing bus services" and the need to secure funds to pay for the line's operation.

The new line continued to be "mothballed" through 2012, and in early 2013 the city government – which owns the system – announced plans to offer the entire system (line and cars) for sale at auction, because it lacked the money to operate it. A one-year financial audit in 2012 found that the line would not generate nearly as much revenue as had originally been forecast, and the resultant need for a much larger operating subsidy exceeded the city's means. The city initially hoped to find a private company willing to operate the line, but the possibility the system to be dismantled became later more probable. Between 2012 and 2021, there was little activity on the project, and the line fell into disrepair.

In December 2021 it was announced that 4.6 million euro from the Next Generation EU fund would be used to finance the final contracts to get the tram system running. Work to revive the line began in October 2023 and test running began in November 2024 to verify that the five Alstom trams had been adequately overhauled after 13 years in storage, and that the infrastructure had been restored to a usable condition.

In September 2025, a tender for the tram's operations contract was launched for €17.8 million (€14.7 million excluding VAT). The first- and second-place bidders, led by ALSA and Avanza, were disqualified due to documentation issues. In early 2026, the contract was proposed for award to the third-place bidder, a consortium of Grupo Ruiz and Barraqueiro, and was signed in mid-May 2026. The contract was valued at €13.2 million and would last four years but could be extended for an additional year. Besides tram operations, the contract also included customer service and the management of the park-and-ride facilities.

Since the end of October 2023, road vehicles were forbidden from using the tramway right-of-way for parking. On 12 January 2024, trams circulated on the tracks within the tram depot (talleres y cocheras) after 13 years of inactivity. By late March 2026, there had been test runs on the tram line from and to the tram depot to verify the correct functioning of systems including traffic light priority. The test runs occurred after technical adjustments to catenary, infrastructure and rolling stock. The municipality (Ayuntamiento de Jaén) assumed all of the costs of restoring the line to its 2011 operating condition. The municipality would be responsible for 75 percent of the line's operating deficit with the regional government (Junta de Andalucía) being responsible for the remainder.

In June 2026, training had started for tram operators in eight-hour shifts for a total of 160 hours per operator. However, in July, the regional government temporarily suspended training for tram operators because of a lack of insurance due to an administrative problem. On 18 August, training runs for tram operators resumed with two trams running the full length of the line from 08:00 to 17:00 initially, then later in the month to 20:00, with a rest break between 13:00 and 14:00.

== Line description ==
The line is 4.7-kilometre (2.9 mi) long and has ten stops, spaced 470 metres (1,540 ft) apart on average. It runs along a north/south axis serving the city centre, the railway station, the bus station, the university district, the future Ciudad de la Justicia, the hospital zone and the business/industrial areas of Los Olivares and Nuevo Jaén. The line was built fully at-grade (entirely on the surface), with track and station platforms separated from traffic. Intersections are the only contact points with motor vehicular traffic. The line will serve 45,000 inhabitants located within 500 metres (1,600 ft) of a stop.

The five low-floor Alstom Citadis trams, model 302 were built in 2007. The maximum speed of the trams is 70 kilometres per hour (43 mph) but the average operating speed over the line will be 20 kilometres per hour (12 mph). The trams run on standard gauge track. The tram depot (talleres y cocheras) is located just north of the Vaciocostales stop.

A separate organization operates local bus service in Jaén. However, despite that, the fare system for both trams and buses will be integrated.
