= Trams in Valladolid =

Rail system in Spain

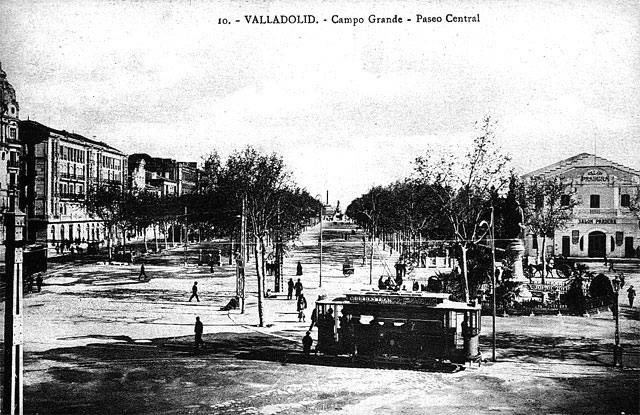
- Electric tram on Zorrilla Square, 1910.

Operation
- Locale: Valladolid, Castile and Leon, Spain

Statistics
Animal traction era: 1881–1910/1911
- Status: Converted to electric operation
- Operator: Sociedad General de Tranvías Interiores de Valladolid
- Track gauge: 1,000 mm (3 ft 3 3/8 in)
- Propulsion system: Mules
Electric tram era: 1910–1933
- Status: Closed
- Owner: Tranvías de Valladolid S.A.
- Track gauge: 1,000 mm (3 ft 3 3/8 in)
- Propulsion system: Electricity
- Electrification: 550 V DC Catenary
- Stock: 18
- Track length (total): 12.27 km (7.62 mi)

Trams in Valladolid was the basis of the transit system in the Spanish city of Valladolid. Trams operated in Valladolid from 1881 until 1933. Trams were not only used for passengers in Valladolid, but also for urban freight transport.

== Animal traction (1881–1910) ==
The company Sociedad General de Tranvías Interiores de Valladolid was created in 1879, headed by Valerio Morales, who presents a proposal for developing the system. Valladolid City Council invited tenders for building and operating the metric gauge tram network, using animal traction. The mentioned society won the contract in June 1880. Immediately, Eduardo Barral, a Catalan entrepreneur, bought the company. The first line was opened on 22 December 1881. It was a 2.100 metres route starting at railway station. It continued by Acera de Recoletos, Santiago Street, Plaza Mayor, Lencería Street, Platerías Street, Cantarranas Street (current Macías Picavea) and Corredera Street (current Angustias), crossing Plaza de San Pablo in order to reach the old bullring. Trams depot was located in Plaza de San Pablo, just in the plot now occupied by Zorrilla High School. The service was provided by four coaches and later enlarged with two more. Each coach was moved by two mules. Six years later rails reached the railway station platforms, making the transfer between train and tram easier.

In 1899, a Belgian company bought the society. Although they wanted to introduce the electrical traction, it was not possible until the company was sold again. However, during this period few extensions were built. The primitive line was expanded to Plaza de San Bartolomé, crossing the river Pisuerga. In addition, a branch was added to serve the Audience and the Cemetery and a new line was opened linking Plaza Mayor and the new bullring built on Paseo Zorrilla.

A local business man and politician, Santiago Alba, promoted a change in the company with other partners and bought it in August 1909. The main objective of new owners was electrify the network.

== Electric traction (1910–1933) ==
In February 1910 the company received the licence to change the traction of the system, and the works to do so started on 26 May 1910. The first line with electric traction opened on 7 September 1910 and it put together the southern part of the scheme (lines between Plaza Mayor, bullring and railway station). In October 1910 two more lines were powered by electricity, Plaza Mayor – Plaza de San Bartolomé / Audience. On 18 April 1911 the line to Cemetery was also electrified. The new depot was located next to Campo Grande park. Apart from works related to the change on traction system, two more routes were opened in 1911, a southern expansion to La Rubia from bullring place and a northern branch from Plaza de San Bartolomé to the ending point of Canal de Castilla. The network reached 12,279 kilometers.

Tram system was not enough efficient as the city expansion registered the two first decades of 20th century. In 1928 the City Council decided to complement this transit system with an urban bus network. This represented a strong rival because of its higher speed and reliability. It led a fast decreasing on passenger statistics after 1930, making the tramway company financially unsustainable. Trams stopped to run on 6 November 1933, and the bid expired in 1940.
