= Vitoria-Gasteiz tram =

Tram system in the Basque Country, Spain

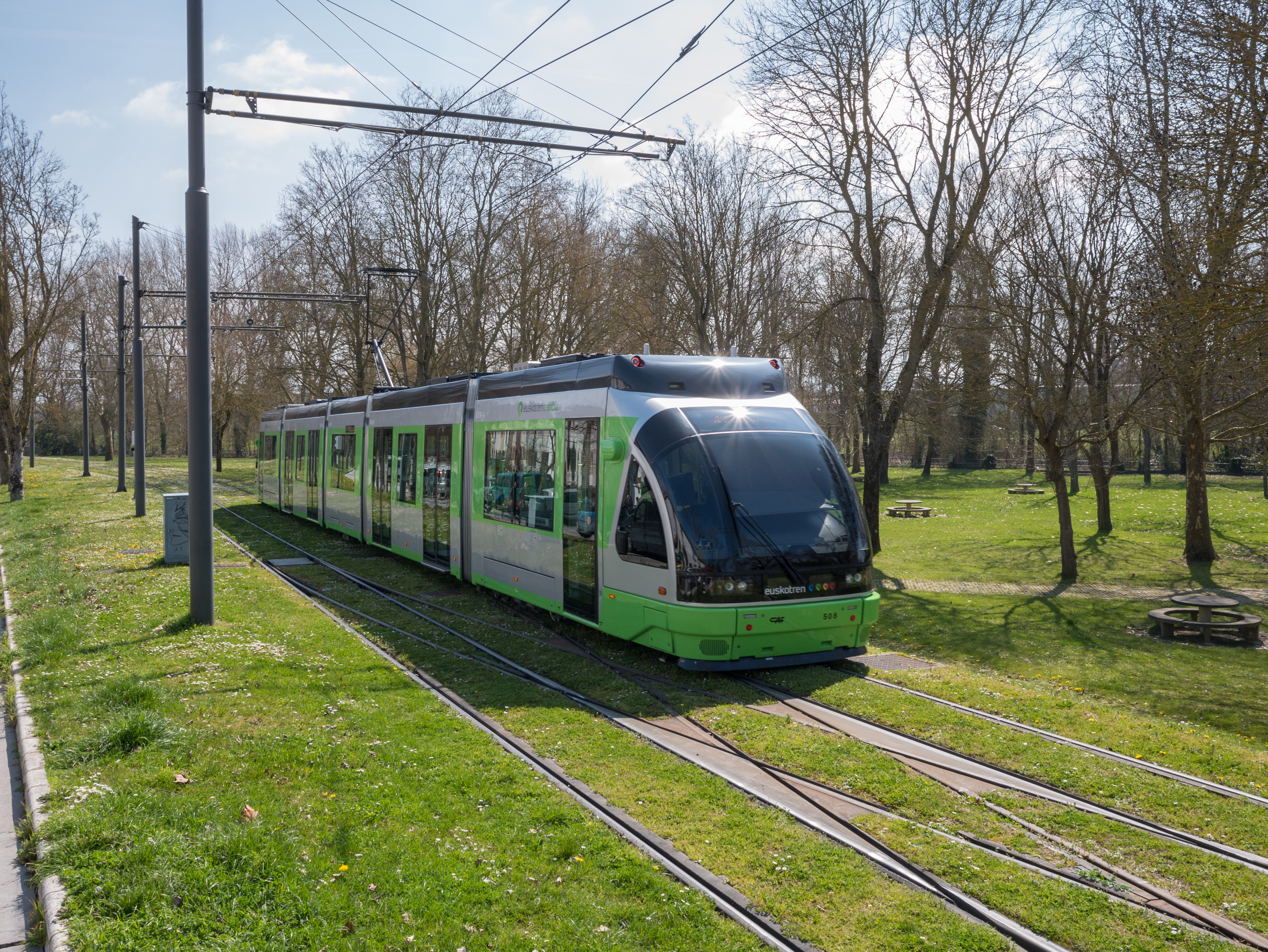
- A 500 series tram in Abetxuko

Overview
- Owner: Euskal Trenbide Sarea
- Locale: Vitoria-Gasteiz, Spain
- Transit type: Tram
- Number of lines: 2
- Number of stations: 28
- Annual ridership: 10.9 million (2024)
- Website: www.euskotren.eus/en/tranvia/vitoria

Operation
- Began operation: 23 December 2008
- Operator: Euskotren
- Rolling stock: 9 Euskotren 500 series (CAF Urbos 2); 7 Euskotren 600 series (CAF Urbos 3)
- Number of vehicles: 16

Technical
- System length: 11.9 km (7.4 mi)
- Track gauge: 1,000 mm (3 ft 3 3/8 in) metre gauge
- Electrification: 750 V DC overhead catenary
- Top speed: 50 km/h (31 mph)
System map

The Vitoria-Gasteiz tram (Basque: Gasteizko tranbia, Spanish: Tranvía de Vitoria) is a tram system in Vitoria-Gasteiz, Basque Country, Spain. It is operated by Euskotren under the brand Euskotren Tranbia (which also manages the tram system in Bilbao). Inaugurated on 23 December 2008, it comprises two lines totaling 11.9 km (7.4 mi).

== System ==
=== Station design ===
The whole line has twenty-three stations (as of May 2021). All tram stops have low platforms, are un-staffed and have automated ticket machines for ticket sales. Once bought, the ticket must be validated on the validation machine located next to the ticket machine. The floors of the stations are virtually level with those of the trams, so this allows wheelchairs, prams, pushchairs and the elderly to board the tram easily with no steps.

In 2019, due to the introduction of the longer 600 series trams; all stops had their platforms lengthened, with the exception of Parlamento/Legebiltzarra (due to space constrains). Therefore, 600 series trams don't open their front and rear doors when stopping there.

=== Lines ===
The network comprises two unnumbered lines, running from Ibaiondo to Salburua and from Abetxuko to Unibertsitatea. Both lines share a common trunk in the city center before branching towards the outskirts (roughly on an "X" shape). On weekdays, the first departure from Ibaiondo is at 6:00, from Unibertsitatea at 6:26, from Abetxuko at 6:06 and from Florida at 6:26. Trams run every 15 minutes during the day on each line, and every 7.5 minutes on their shared stretch. The last departure from Ibaiondo is at 22:45, from Unibertsitatea at 23:11, from Abetxuko at 22:34 and from Florida at 23:06. Weekend service has shorter hours of operation.

The two lines are not numbered. Instead, each terminus is given a color and a number of dots: Unibertsitatea red-1, Ibaiondo green-2, Abetxuko white-3 and Salburua purple-4. The indicators (called Minutran) mounted on top of the shelters show the time remaining for the next departures together with the number of dots and color corresponding to their destinations.

There are upcoming plans of expanding the tram service to the areas of Zabalgana and Júndiz, but there is no information about the line's color or the amount of dots, like the three green dots in Ibaiondo's line.

==== Stop list ====
| Station | Location | Lines | Opening date |
|---|---|---|---|
| Abetxuko | 42°52′34″N 2°40′47″W | Abetxuko-Unibertsitatea | 7 September 2012 |
| Kristo | 42°52′27″N 2°40′39″W | Abetxuko-Unibertsitatea | 7 September 2012 |
| Kañabenta | 42°52′26″N 2°40′53″W | Abetxuko-Unibertsitatea | 10 July 2009 |
| Artapadura | 42°52′10″N 2°40′49″W | Abetxuko-Unibertsitatea | 10 July 2009 |
| Arriaga | 42°52′00″N 2°40′43″W | Abetxuko-Unibertsitatea | 10 July 2009 |
| Gernikako Arbola | 42°51′53″N 2°40′51″W | Abetxuko-Unibertsitatea | 10 July 2009 |
| Forondako atea/Portal de Foronda | 42°51′46″N 2°41′04″W | Abetxuko-Unibertsitatea | 10 July 2009 |
| Intermodal | 42°51′37″N 2°40′58″W | Abetxuko-Unibertsitatea | 10 July 2009 |
| Ibaiondo | 42°51′53″N 2°42′07″W | Ibaiondo-Salburua | 23 December 2008 |
| Landaberde | 42°51′58″N 2°41′54″W | Ibaiondo-Salburua | 23 December 2008 |
| Lakuabizkarra | 42°51′47″N 2°41′40″W | Ibaiondo-Salburua | 23 December 2008 |
| Wellington | 42°51′36″N 2°41′32″W | Ibaiondo-Salburua | 23 December 2008 |
| Txagorritxu | 42°51′25″N 2°41′20″W | Ibaiondo-Salburua | 23 December 2008 |
| Euskal Herria | 42°51′29″N 2°41′06″W | Ibaiondo-Salburua | 23 December 2008 |
| Honduras | 42°51′26″N 2°40′52″W | Ibaiondo-Salburua; Abetxuko-Unibertsitatea | 23 December 2008 |
| Europa | 42°51′09″N 2°40′49″W | Ibaiondo-Salburua; Abetxuko-Unibertsitatea | 23 December 2008 |
| Antso Jakituna/Sancho el Sabio | 42°50′53″N 2°40′48″W | Ibaiondo-Salburua; Abetxuko-Unibertsitatea | 23 December 2008 |
| Lovaina | 42°50′46″N 2°40′42″W | Ibaiondo-Salburua; Abetxuko-Unibertsitatea | 23 December 2008 |
| Legebiltzarra/Parlamento | 42°50′43″N 2°40′28″W | Ibaiondo-Salburua; Abetxuko-Unibertsitatea | 23 December 2008 |
| Angulema | 42°50′36″N 2°40′04″W | Ibaiondo-Salburua; Abetxuko-Unibertsitatea | 23 December 2008 |
| Florida | 42°50′31″N 2°39′54″W | Ibaiondo-Salburua; Abetxuko-Unibertsitatea | 14 February 2020 |
| Hegoalde | 42°50′20″N 2°39′59″W | Abetxuko-Unibertsitatea | 14 February 2020 |
| Unibertsitatea | 42°50′13″N 2°40′21″W | Abetxuko-Unibertsitatea | 14 February 2020 |
| Santa Luzia | | Ibaiondo-Salburua | 11 April 2023 |
| Iliada | | Ibaiondo-Salburua | 11 April 2023 |
| Nikosia | | Ibaiondo-Salburua | 11 April 2023 |
| La Union | | Ibaiondo-Salburua | 11 April 2023 |
| Salburua | | Ibaiondo-Salburua | 11 April 2023 |

== See also ==
- TUVISA
