= Murcia tram =

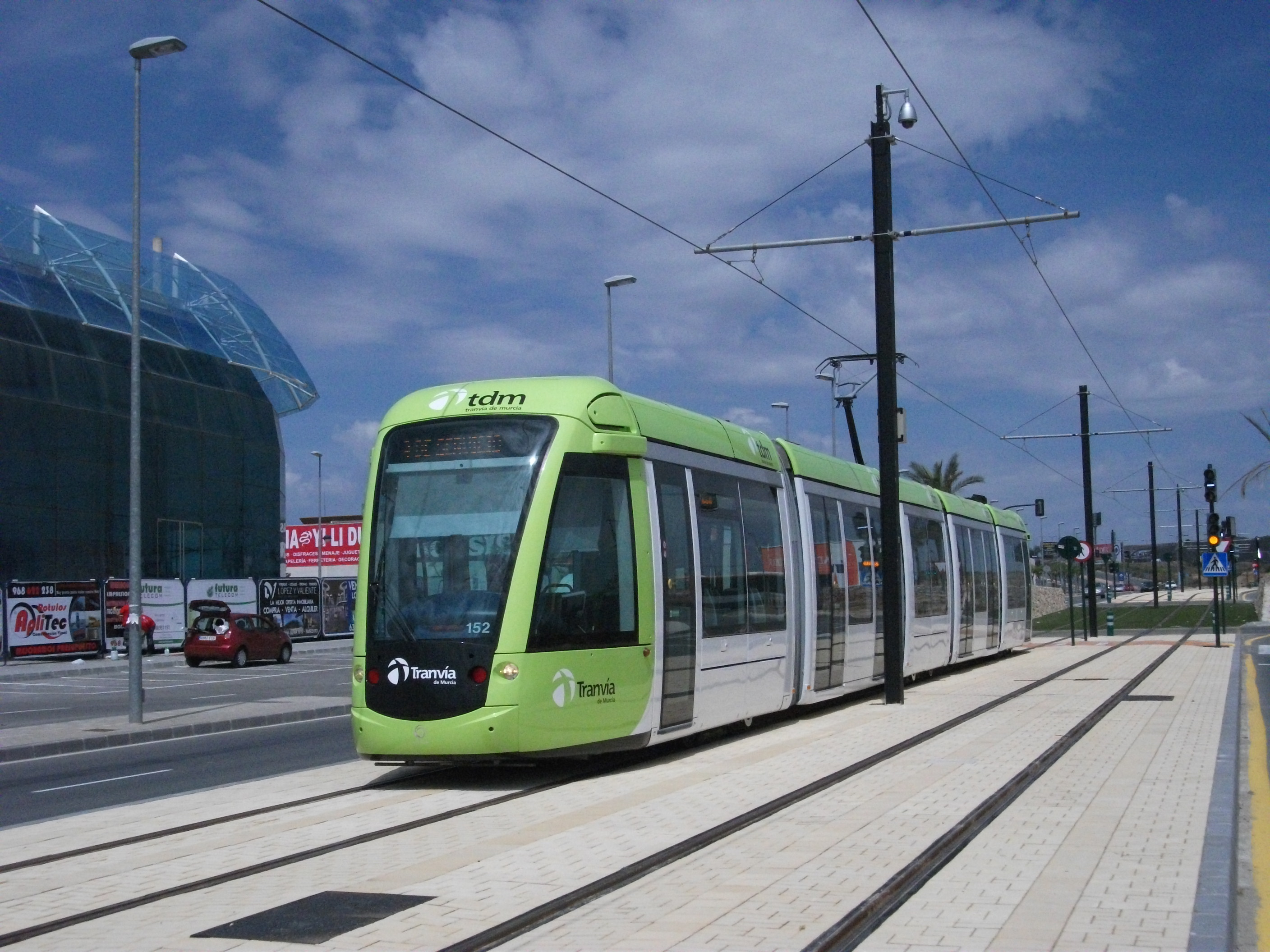
- Alstom Citadis 302 in Murcia

Overview
- Native name: Tranvía de Murcia
- Owner: Tranvimur
- Locale: Murcia, Spain
- Transit type: Light rail
- Number of lines: 2
- Number of stations: 28
- Annual ridership: 5 million
- Website: Tranvía de Murcia

Operation
- Began operation: 28 May 2011
- Number of vehicles: 11

Technical
- System length: 17.5 km (10.9 mi)
- Track gauge: 1,435 mm (4 ft 8 1/2 in) standard gauge
- Electrification: Overhead line, 750 V DC

The Murcia tram is a tram/light rail system in the Spanish city of Murcia. After a trial phase in 2007, the full 17.5 km (10.9 mi) system opened in 2011 and links the city centre with the northern suburbs.

== Background ==
In April 2007, a 2.2 km (1.4 mi) demonstration line was opened, built by the Tranvimur joint venture of Acciona and Grupo Cívica, along Avenida Juan Carlos I. The trial was deemed successful in August 2008 and the rest of the system was built after a tendering process, which awarded a contract to Sociedad Concesionaria Tranvía de Murcia, a consortium of the companies COMSA EMTE Concesiones and FCC. The contract provided for the construction of the current system and operation of the system for a duration of 40 years at a price of 264 million Euros. The current system opened in 2011.

== Line 1 ==
A tram on the university loop

Line 1 is the principal line of the system; it serves 24 of the system's 28 stops and is 14.5 kilometres long. It starts in the north-west of the city with a three-kilometre, one-way loop around the campus of the University of Murcia and goes down Avenida Juan Carlos I towards the city centre, where it passes through the Plaza Circular. The tram then travels northward along Avenida Don Juan de Borbón, before branching off toward the Estadio Nueva Condomina, where it terminates.

== Line 1B ==
Line 1B is a three-kilometre branch line which connects with line 1 at the Los Rectores-Tierra Natura station. The line travels has five stops and terminates at UCAM-Los Jerónimos station adjacent to the Universidad Católica San Antonio de Murcia.

== Rolling stock ==
The system uses a total of 11 Alstom Citadis 302 units. The units were originally purchased by Madrid for use in the Metro Ligero system. Two of the units were used during the pilot line, and the remaining nine were acquired by the construction consortium. The maintenance yard and depot is located directly adjacent to the La Ladera station.
