= Euskotren 300 series =

Electric multiple unit operated by Euskotren

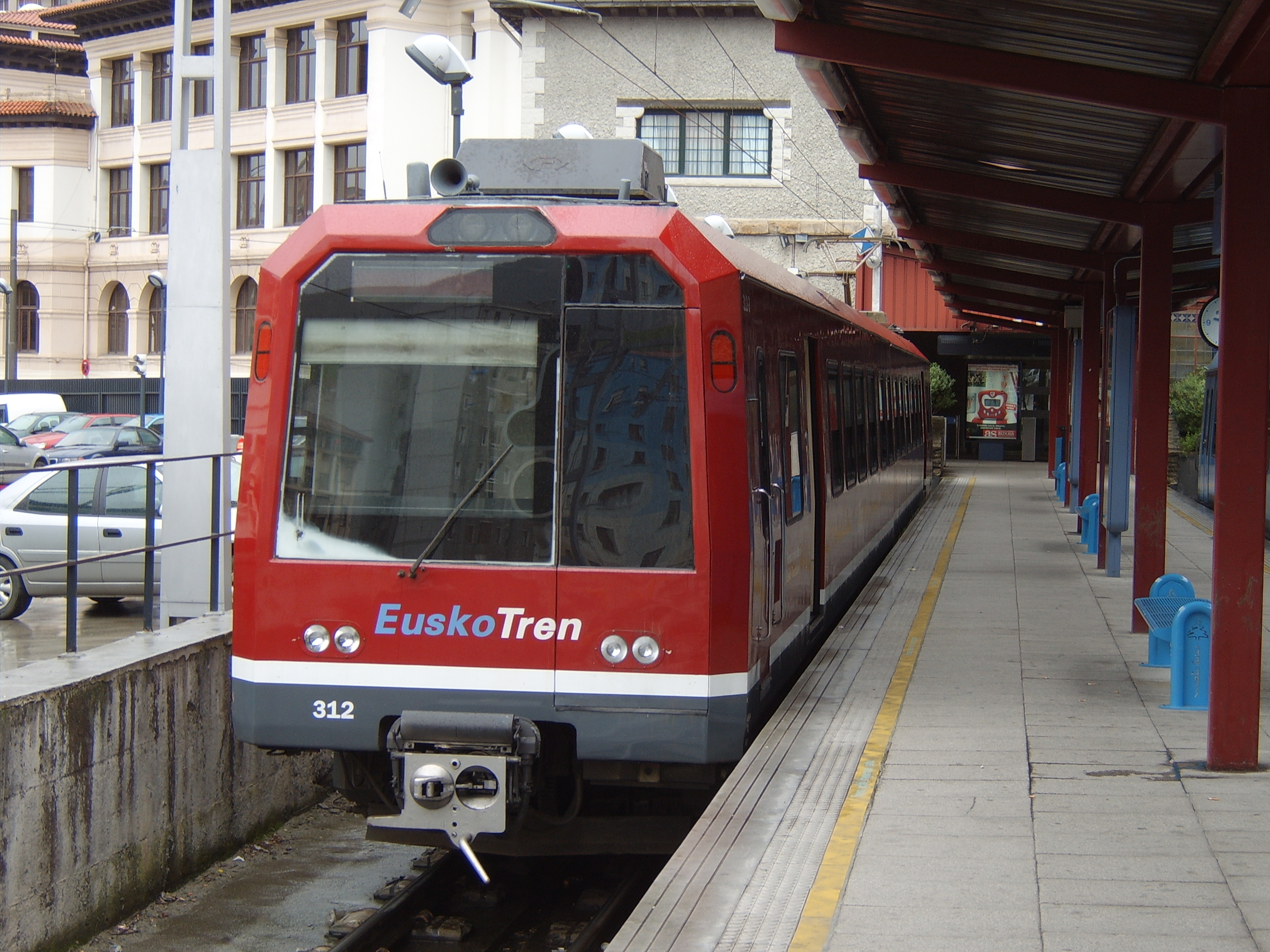
- Set 312 in Bilbao-Atxuri, March 2006
- In service: 1990–2018
- Manufacturers: CAF, B&W
- Built at: Beasain, Spain
- Replaced: 3500 series
- Constructed: 1989–1990
- Entered service: 1990
- Number built: 12
- Number preserved: 1
- Number scrapped: 11
- Formation: 2 cars
- Fleet numbers: 301–312
- Capacity: 86 (seated)
- Operator: Euskotren

Specifications
- Car body construction: Aluminium
- Train length: 30,480 mm (100 ft 0 in)
- Width: 2,550 mm (8 ft 4 3/8 in)
- Height: 3,555 mm (11 ft 7 15/16 in)
- Doors: 2 (per side and car)
- Maximum speed: 90 km/h (55.9 mph)
- Power output: 516 kW (692 hp) (total)
- Electric system: 1,500 V DC overhead line
- Current collection: Pantograph
- UIC classification: Bo'Bo'+2'2'
- Safety system: LZB
- Coupling system: Scharfenberg
- Track gauge: 1,000 mm (3 ft 3 3/8 in)

The Euskotren 300 series was an electric multiple unit (EMU) train type operated by Euskotren in the Basque Country, Spain from 1990 to 2018.

== History ==
The 12 trains were delivered to Euskotren in 1990. They were built by CAF, with the exception of the non-driving cars of the 308 to 312 units, which were built by Babcock & Wilcox. They substituted the 3500 series trains on the Topo line. Due to the number of tunnels on that line, the trains were equipped with an emergency exit on the front.

Three of the trains (310, 311 and 312) were used on Euskopullman services. The Euskopullman was a limited express service that run from Bilbao to Hendaye from 1998 to 1999. The trains operating it had less seats, and they were fitted with tables and a bar. They were the only trains in Euskotren's fleet equipped with toilets until 2008, when some 200 series trains had toilets installed.

After the opening of the Bilbao Metro in 1995, 200 series trains were gradually introduced on the Topo line. Thus, 300 series EMUs were relocated to the Urdaibai and Txorierri lines.

After the introduction of the 950 series in 2016, 300 series trains have been retired. One unit (308) served on the Txorierri line until 2018, operating an hourly shuttle between Sondika and Lutxana. That EMU has been preserved by the Basque Railway Museum, while the rest have been scrapped.

== Formations ==
Designation	Mc	Rc
Numbering	3xx-1	3xx-3

Each trainset was formed by a motored car and a non-powered car. Usually, two EMUs were coupled together into four-car sets; although coupling three EMUs was also possible.

== See also ==
- Euskotren rolling stock
