= Irun Colon station =

Railway station in Irun, Basque Country, Spain

Irun Colon
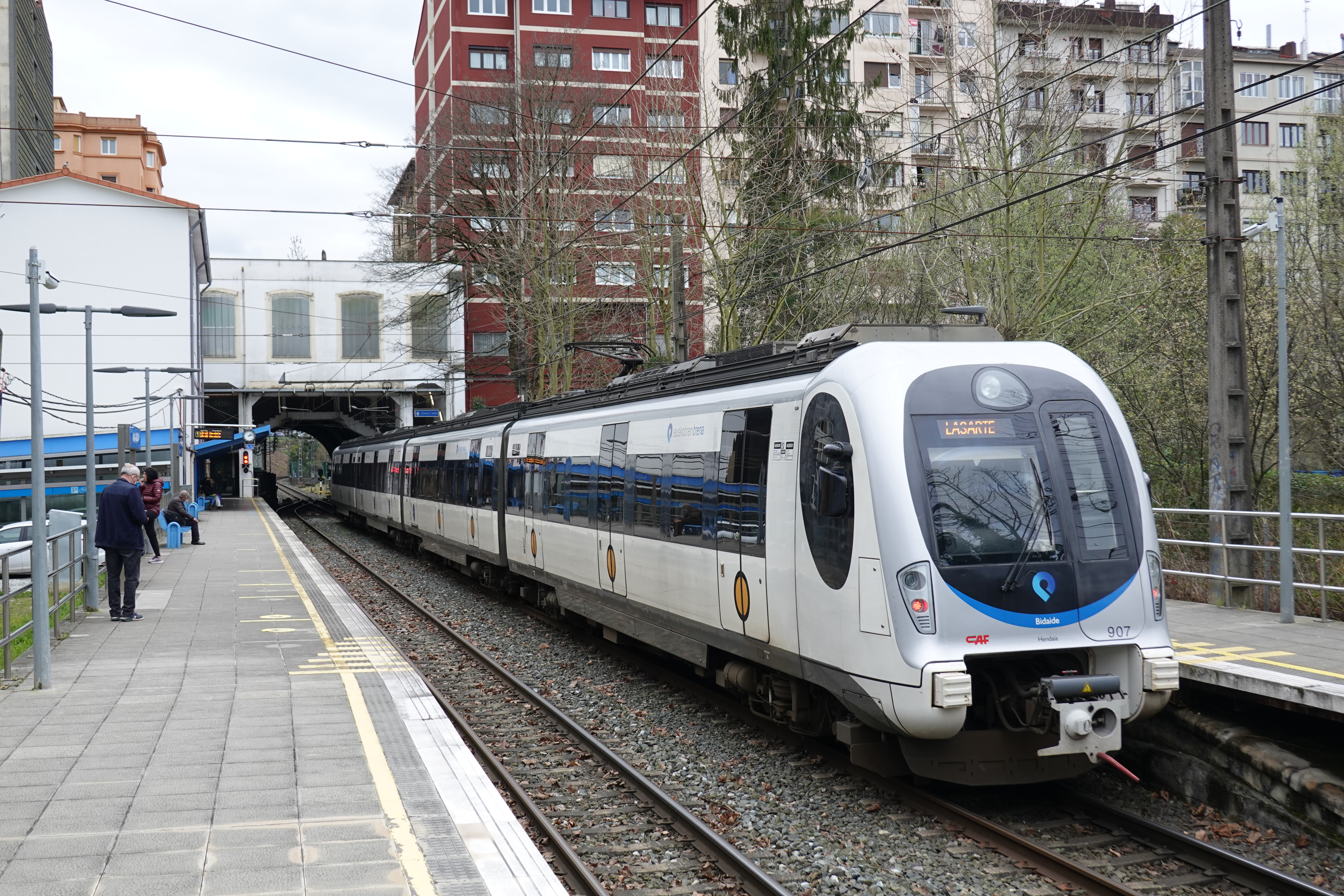
- A 900 series train at the station

General information
- Location: Irun, Gipuzkoa; Spain
- Coordinates: 43°20′N 1°48′W
- Owner: Euskal Trenbide Sarea
- Operator: Euskotren
- Line: Line T1
- Platforms: 2 side platforms
- Tracks: 2

Construction
- Structure type: At-grade
- Parking: No
- Accessible: Yes

History
- Opened: 5 December 1912

Passengers
- 2017: 645,163

Services
Preceding station	Euskotren Trena	Following station
Belaskoenea towards Lasarte-Oria	Line T1	Irun Ficoba towards Hendaia
Location

Irun Colon is a railway station in Irun, Basque Country, Spain. It is owned by Euskal Trenbide Sarea and operated by Euskotren. It lies on the San Sebastián-Hendaye railway, popularly known as the Topo line.

== History ==
The station opened in 1912 as the eastern terminus of the San Sebastián-Hendaye railway. The line was extended to Hendaye the next year.

The station was made fully accessible in 2018, when an elevator was added to the Hendaye-bound platform. Previously, the only step-free access to that platform was via the opposite platform and a level crossing, which was removed afterwards.

== Services ==
The station is served by Euskotren Trena line E2. In the Lasarte-Oria direction, it runs every 15 minutes during weekdays and weekend afternoons, and every 30 minutes on weekend mornings. In the Hendaye direction, it runs every 30 minutes throughout the week.
