= Euskotren 950 series =

Electric multiple unit operated by Euskotren

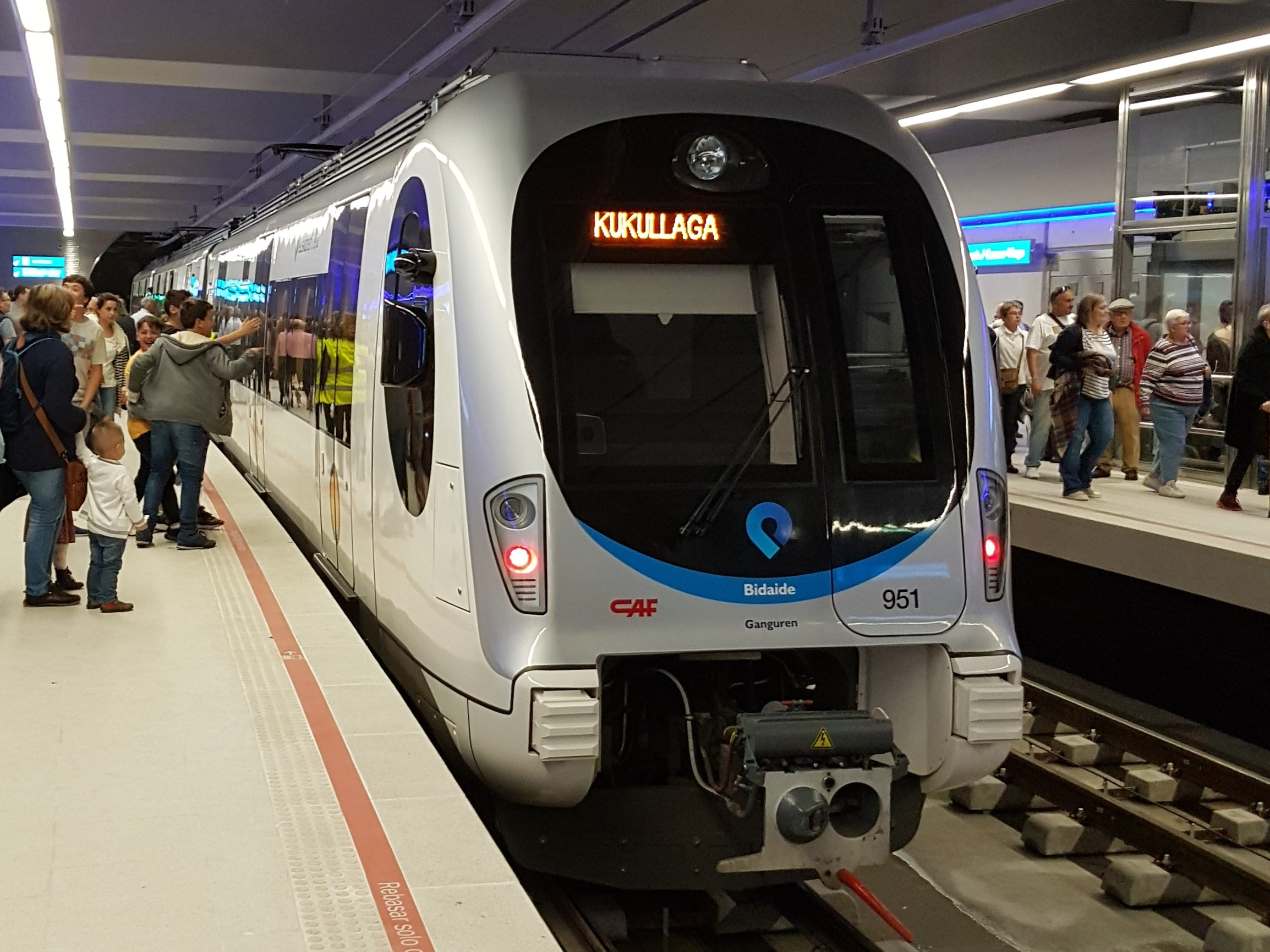
- 950 series train at Zazpikaleak/Casco Viejo in April 2017
- In service: 2016–present
- Manufacturer: CAF
- Built at: Beasain, Spain
- Replaced: 200, 300 series
- Constructed: 2015–2018
- Entered service: 2 July 2016
- Number built: 28 sets
- Number in service: 28 sets
- Formation: 3-car sets
- Fleet numbers: 951–978
- Capacity: 296
- Operator: Euskotren

Specifications
- Car body construction: Aluminium
- Train length: 52,458 mm (172 ft 1 1/4 in)
- Car length: 17,729 mm (58 ft 2 in) (end cars); 17 m (55 ft 9 5/16 in) (intermediate cars)
- Width: 2.6 m (8 ft 6 3/8 in)
- Height: 3,615 mm (11 ft 10 5/16 in)
- Floor height: 1.08 m (3 ft 6 1/2 in)
- Doors: 3 per side
- Wheel diameter: 850–790 mm (33–31 in) (new–worn)
- Maximum speed: 90 km/h (56 mph)
- Traction system: CAF IGBT–VVVF
- Traction motors: 8 × TSA TME 44-26-4 180 kW (240 hp)
- Power output: 1,440 kW (1,930 hp)
- Transmission: 5.9:1 gear ratio
- Electric systems: 1,500 V DC overhead line
- Current collection: Pantograph
- UIC classification: Bo′Bo′+2′2′+Bo′Bo′
- Safety system: LZB
- Coupling system: Scharfenberg
- Track gauge: 1,000 mm (3 ft 3 3/8 in) metre gauge

The Euskotren 950 series is an electric multiple unit (EMU) train type operated by Euskotren in the Basque Country, Spain.

== History ==
In June 2014, Euskotren awarded CAF the construction of 28 3-car EMUs for 150 million euros. They are similar to the earlier 900 series, but feature improved accessibility.

The first trainset was delivered in November 2015. The series entered service on the Txorierri line on 2 July 2016. The series gradually replaced the older 200 and 300 series trains, with the last unit being delivered in 2018. Now, they also run local services between Eibar and Ermua, on the Urdaibai line, and on Bilbao Metro Line 3.

== Interior ==
Each train has 94 seats, with additional space for 202 standing passengers. Internally, the three cars are connected with open gangways. Wheelchair space is provided at one end of the intermediate car, the doors near it are equipped with ramps. All trains have dedicated spaces for passengers carrying bicycles.

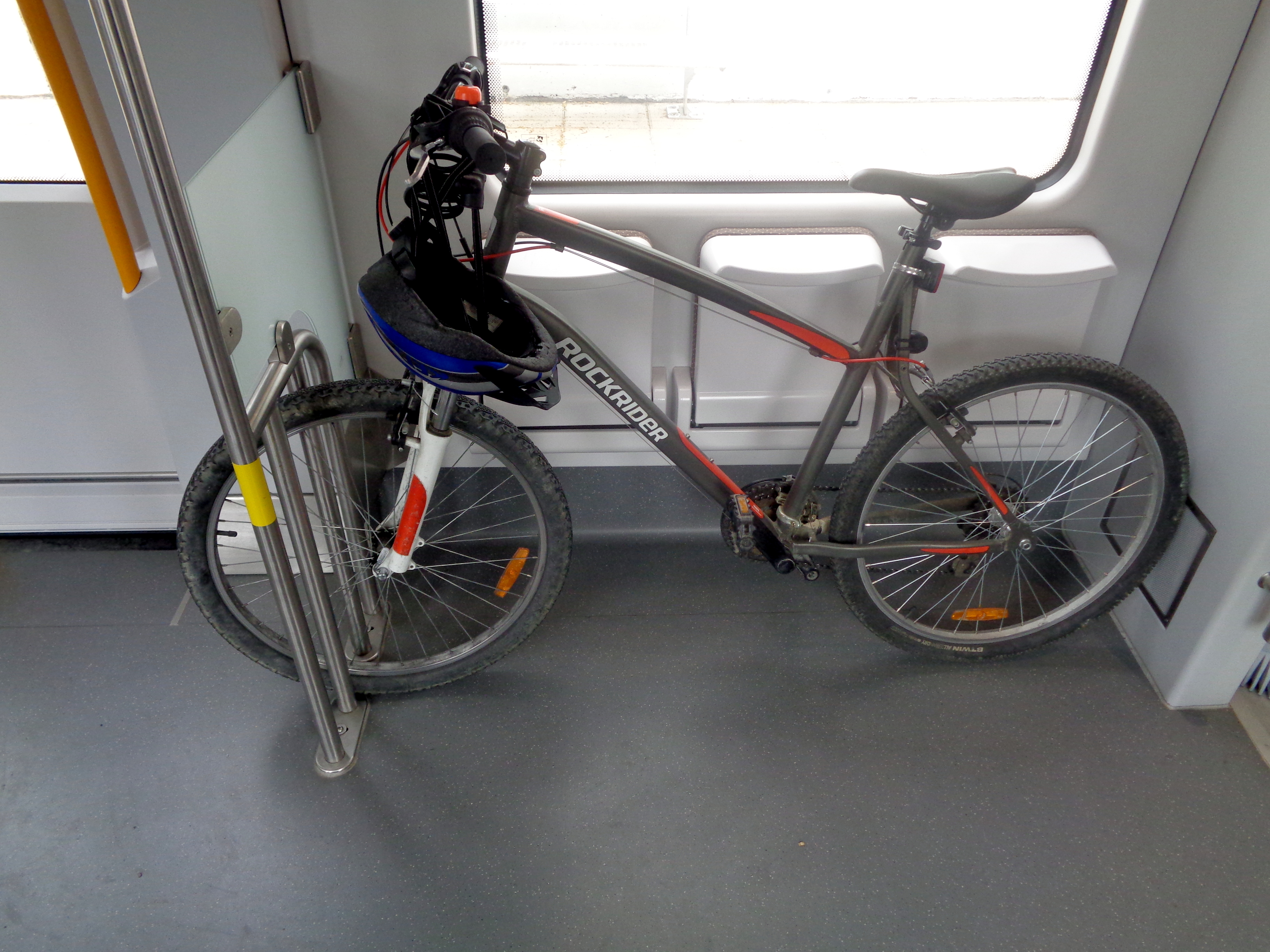
Dedicated space for bicycles.

== Naming ==
Each unit is named after a mountain of the Basque Country. The first 17 EMUs have the same names as the electric locomotives operated by Ferrocarriles Vascongados (a historical company that preceded Euskotren).

== See also ==
- Euskotren rolling stock
- Euskotren 900 series – the four-car counterpart of the 950 series
