= Construcciones y Auxiliar de Ferrocarriles =

Spanish railway and bus manufacturing company

Construcciones y Auxiliar de Ferrocarriles, S.A.
- Type: Sociedad Anónima
- Traded as: BMAD: CAF
- ISIN: ES0121975009
- Industry: Manufacturing
- Founded: 1917 (Compañía Auxiliar de Ferrocarriles)
- Headquarters: Beasain, Basque Country (autonomous community), Spain
- Number of locations: 11 factories, including: Beasain (Basque Country); Zaragoza (Aragon); Irún (Basque Country); Linares (Andalusia); Hortolandia (Brazil); Huehuetoca (Mexico); Elmira, New York (US); Bagnères-de-Bigorre (France); Newport, South Wales (UK)
- Key people: Jose María Baztarrica Garijo, Andrés Arizkorreta (Chief Executive Officer and Chairman)
- Products: Design, manufacture, maintenance and supply of equipment and components for railway systems
- Revenue: ▲€2.943 billion (2021)
- Operating income: ▲€165 million (2021)
- Net income: ▲€89 million (2021)
- Total assets: ▲€4.269 billion (2021)
- Total equity: ▲€740.4 million (2021)
- Owner: Public; Employees via Cartera Social S.A. (25%); Kutxabank (14%)
- Number of employees: 13,284 (2021)
- Website: cafmobility.com

Construcciones y Auxiliar de Ferrocarriles (Grupo CAF, lit. 'Construction and Other Railway Services') is a Spanish publicly listed company which manufactures railway vehicles and equipment and buses through its Solaris Bus & Coach subsidiary. It is based in Beasain, Basque Autonomous Community, Spain. Equipment manufactured by Grupo CAF includes light rail vehicles, rapid transit trains, railroad cars and locomotives, as well as variable gauge axles that can be fitted on any existing truck or bogie.

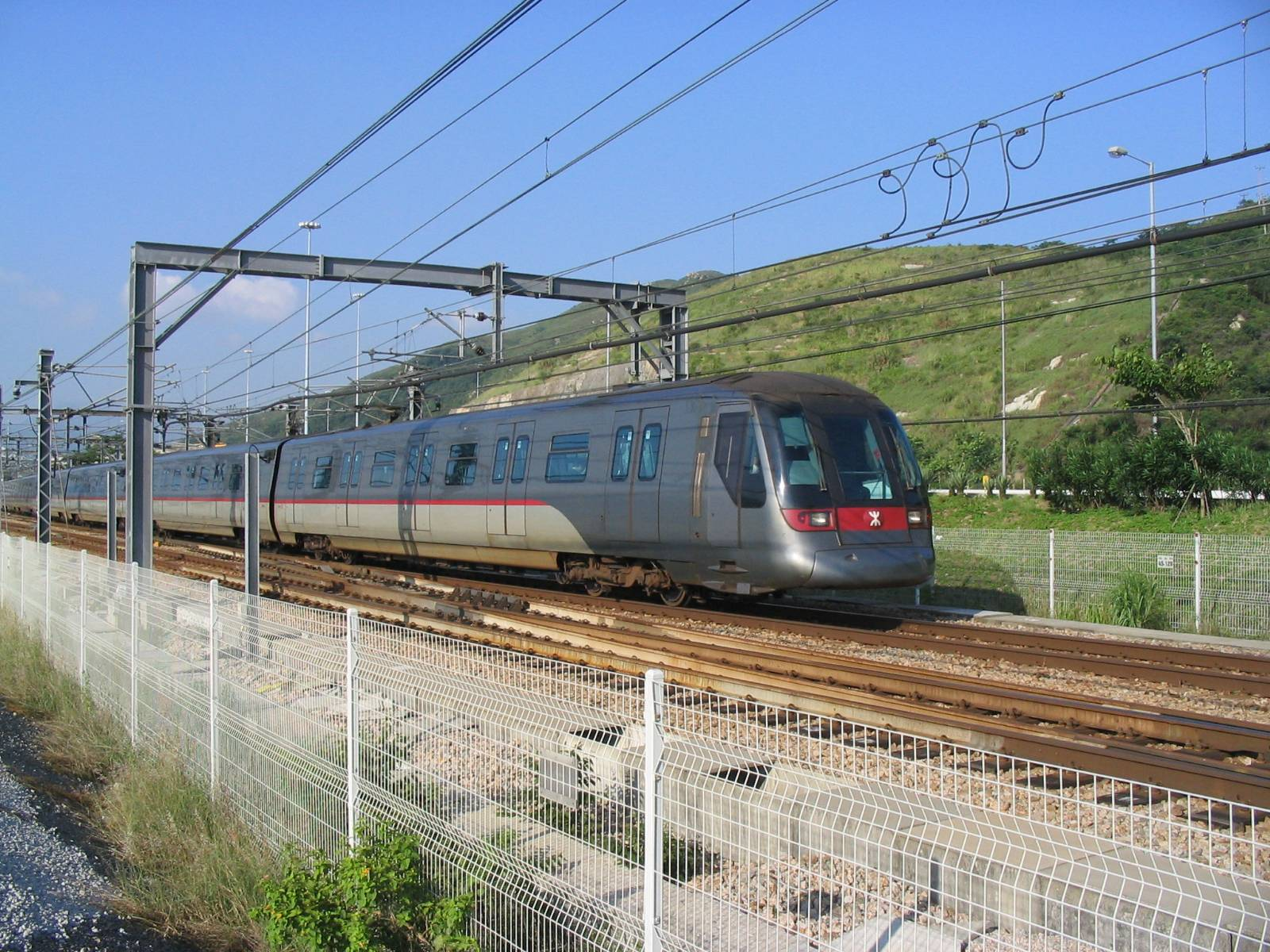
Hong Kong Mass Transit Railway Adtranz–CAF EMU built by CAF and Adtranz

Over the 20 years from the early 1990s, CAF benefited from the rail investment boom in its home market in Spain to become a world player with a broad technical capability, able to manufacture almost any type of rail vehicle. CAF has supplied railway rolling stock to a number of major urban transit operators around Europe, the US, South America, East Asia, India, Australia and North Africa.

== History ==
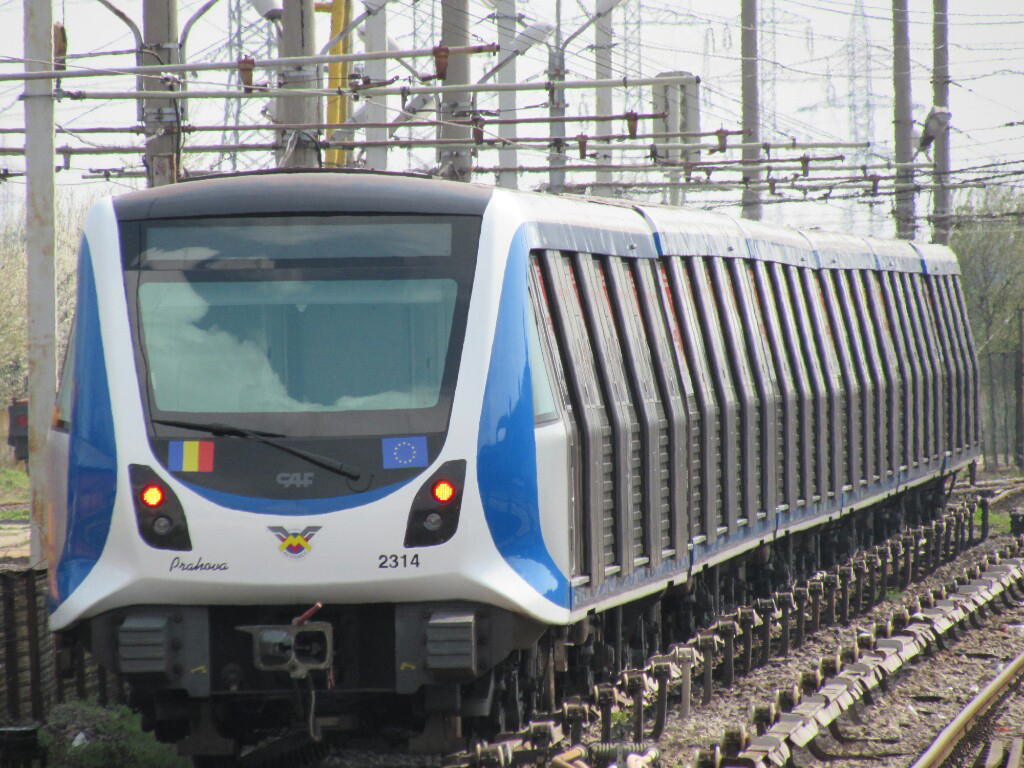
Bucharest Metro trains, built between 2013 and 2014

CAF was an acronym for the earlier name of Compañía Auxiliar de Ferrocarriles, as well as for Construcciones y Auxiliar de Feres.

=== Fábrica de Hierros San Martín ===
In 1860, Domingo Goitia, Martín Usabiaga and José Francisco Arana established in the city of Besain, next to the Northern railway, the company Fábrica de Hierros San Martín, whose main activity was puddling furnaces and cylinder rolling.

=== La Maquinista Guipuzcoana ===
In 1892, Francisco de Goitia (Domingo Goitia's son and heir) joined the Marquess of Urquijo to set up La Maquinista Guipuzcoana, whose main activity was the operation of machinery and the forging and construction of railway rolling stock for other companies in the area like Compañía del Tranvía de San Sebastián.

In 1898, it set up its plant in Beasain, Gipuzkoa. In 1901, Maquinista Guipuzcoana was taken over by the Sociedad Española de Construcciones Metálicas (SECM), which already owned 5 factories. In 1901, the SECM secured a contract to manufacture 50 ore transport wagons for the railway line from Bilbao to Portugalete, followed by others sold to the Castro-Alen mining railway and the La Reunión mines, in Seville.

Each of the factories of the SECM, located in cities like Bilbao, Gijón or Linares among others, plus the new facilities in Madrid, were dedicated to the manufacture of a specific component, being the Besain factory was dedicated to the manufacture of railcars. To do so, they demolished all the manufacturing facilities inherited from La Maquinista Guipuzcoana in Beasin in order to build a new factory designed by the German engineer Franz Melaun and the architect Luis Landecho. The new facilities had a capacity for the full construction of up to 3,000 railcars per year. The production of railcars started in the new installations on November 1, 1904, just 27 months after the cornerstone was settled.

This factory had a workforce of 469 employees, of whom almost 200 were foreigners, mainly of German origin. On March 13, 1905, its first order of fifteen hopper cars was delivered to the Sociedad de Gasificación Industrial (in English, Industrial Gasification Society) in Madrid.

In 1905 the company changed its name to Fábrica de Vagones de Beasain (FVB). The consolidation of the company took place during the years of the World War I thanks to the demand from the Belgian and French railways.

=== Compañía Auxiliar de Ferrocarriles ===
Compañía Auxiliar de Ferrocarriles (CAF) was founded on March 4, 1917, for the construction, purchase, sale, or rental of railcars and other related items intended for the transportation and operation of railroads and trams, and specializing in freight car production and with a total of 1,600 employees. In 1922, following various expansions, CAF's share capital was distributed between the French group Firminy and the Urquijo group, although ownership of the Besain factory remained in the hands of the SECM group, which leased it to CAF operation.

In 1925, Banco Urquijo acquired all the shares in CAF that belonged to foreign investors, most of whom were French. The operation involved two capital increases by CAF and culminated in the acquisition of the modernized Beasain plant, which extended across the municipalities of Beasain, Lazcano, and Villafranca de Oria. In terms of production, in 1929 CAF was responsible for up to 30% of Spanish railcar production. In addition, during the 1920s and 1930s, its portfolio included the production of electric locomotives and freight cars.

The Spanish Civil War led to the militarization of facilities and production of CAF. In the 1940s, after the Spanish Civil War, a period during which the facilities were militarized, CAF began to expand by leasing workshops in Irún and Madrid. In 1947 it acquired part of the Sociedad de Material Móvil y Construcciones de Zaragoza.

Since 1958, the company has modernized and enlarged its Beasain plant and expanded its activity to include all kinds of rolling stock. In 1968, CAF began manufacturing the Jeepster Commando, marketed by Viasa. In line with this, in 1969 CAF created its Research and Development Unit, which increased the company's competitiveness and intensified the focus on in-house technology.

=== Construcciones y Auxiliar de Ferrocarriles ===
In 1971, the company adopted its current name Construcciones y Auxiliar de Ferrocarriles when the existing Compañía Auxiliar de Ferrocarriles (CAF) merged with Material Móvil y Construcciones (MMC). MMC was a company from Zaragoza founded in 1920 but with origins at the end of the 19th century, when the family business Talleres Escoriaza joined with the French businessman Nicolás Carde to develop mechanical carpentry and specialize in the manufacture of railway and tram car bodies, such as the line to Torrero in Zaragoza.

In 2001, CAF participated in the Madrid-Barcelona high-speed rail project, and around that time began its internationalization process in countries such as Hong Kong, United Kingdom, and the United States. In 2002, the Comprehensive Railway Maintenance Technology Center was inaugurated.

In 2004, CAF delivered the first variable gauge, dual-voltage high-speed train. The next year, CAF achieved the first contract for the sale of a Spanish high-speed train abroad, to provide trains to the high-speed line connecting Ankara and Istanbul. By 2009, CAF was already present in countries such as Brazil, Mexico, Chile, and Argentina, and 42% of its turnover corresponded to exports. That year, it presented the prototype of the Fast Charging Accumulator (FCA) system to enable light rail or tram circulation without the need for overhead power lines or catenary systems. In 2011, it launched the family of very high-speed trains that can reach 350 km/h, Oaris.

In 2018, CAF took over the Polish bus manufacturer Solaris. In 2021, SNCF Voyageurs awarded CAF a contract to supply 28 trains for the lines connecting Paris with Limoges, Toulouse and Clermont-Ferrand. The company also acquired the Talent 3 platform from competitor Bombardier Transportation in 2022, as well as the Coradia Polyvalent platform and the plant in Reichshoffen from train manufacturer Alstom. This was a condition imposed by the European Commission's competition authority for the approval of the 2021 takeover of Bombardier Transportation by Alstom. The same year, CAF purchased one of Alstom's factories in France, located in the town of Reichshoffen.

CAF began the construction of the Gelsenkirchen-Bismarck railway depot to house the fleet of the regions of Lower Rhine and Münster in 2024, while securing a new contract with SNCF Voyageurs to supply 22 Intercités trains to cover the route between Bordeaux and Marseille. Also, obtained contracts to supply units for the metros in Santiago, Medellín and Madrid.

In 2025, CAF secured a contract worth nearly €100 million with the Syndicat des Mobilités de Touraine to supply 19 Urbos trams for the La Riche to Chambray-lès-Tours line, apart from receiving orders for trams in other French cities like Montpellier, Marseille and Grenoble, trains for the RER B line in Paris and for the regional trains in Nouvelle-Aquitaine, among other contracts. That year, the National Railway Company of Belgium (SNCB) announced that it had chosen CAF for a mega contract to renew its train fleet by 2034 worth several billion euros. The company also signed its first project in Morocco, as well as other contracts in Taipei, Cairo, Naples and Helsinki.

== Legacy ==
In 2008, CAF donated more than 4,000 photographs and almost 400,000 plans and drawings of hundreds of its projects carried out between the late 19th century and 1979 to the Provincial Historical Archive of Zaragoza, representing the evolution of railways and trams in Spain.

In 2014, CAF was awarded with the Light Rail Award in the category of best rolling stock manufacturer. In 2017, an exhibition was inaugurated at the Basque Railway Museum, in Azpeitia, to commemorate the company's centenary, organized by the Lemniskata cultural association, with the collaboration of Euskotren.

CAF's president, Andrés Arizkorreta, was awarded in 2024 by the Italian Chamber of Commerce for Spain (CCIS) and the CEOE with the Tiepolo Prize alongside with Andrea Sironi, president of Assicurazioni Generali. The Igartza Literary Creation Grant for New Writers 2025, organised by Beasain Town Council and the assistance of the publishing house Elkar argitaletxea, received the support of CAF.

== Subsidiaries ==
CAF U.S.A., a wholly owned subsidiary of CAF, was incorporated in 1998 and is based in Elmira, New York. It manufactures rolling stock for the North American market at a plant in Elmira that the company acquired from ADtranz in 2000.

On 24 May 2019, it announced the acquisition of the Swedish company Euromaint at a cost of circa €80 million, following other international contracts to supply Flemish and English railway and underground networks in 2017.

CAF Rolling Stock U.K. Ltd. is the CAF subsidiary in the United Kingdom. Its Newport factory is based at Celtic Springs Business Park, at Llanwern steelworks near Newport, Wales as a result of an agreement made between CAF and the Welsh Government. The Newport factory has built stock for Transport for Wales, Arriva Rail North, the Docklands Light Railway, and potentially High Speed 2 if CAF win the bid process. They also donated £150,000 to the Conservative Party.

CAF Signalling was fined in 2021 with 1.7 million euros by the Spanish commission on markets and competition because of its participation in a cartel with other 7 international companies which colluded in tenders over Spanish rail infrastructure.

== Rolling stock ==
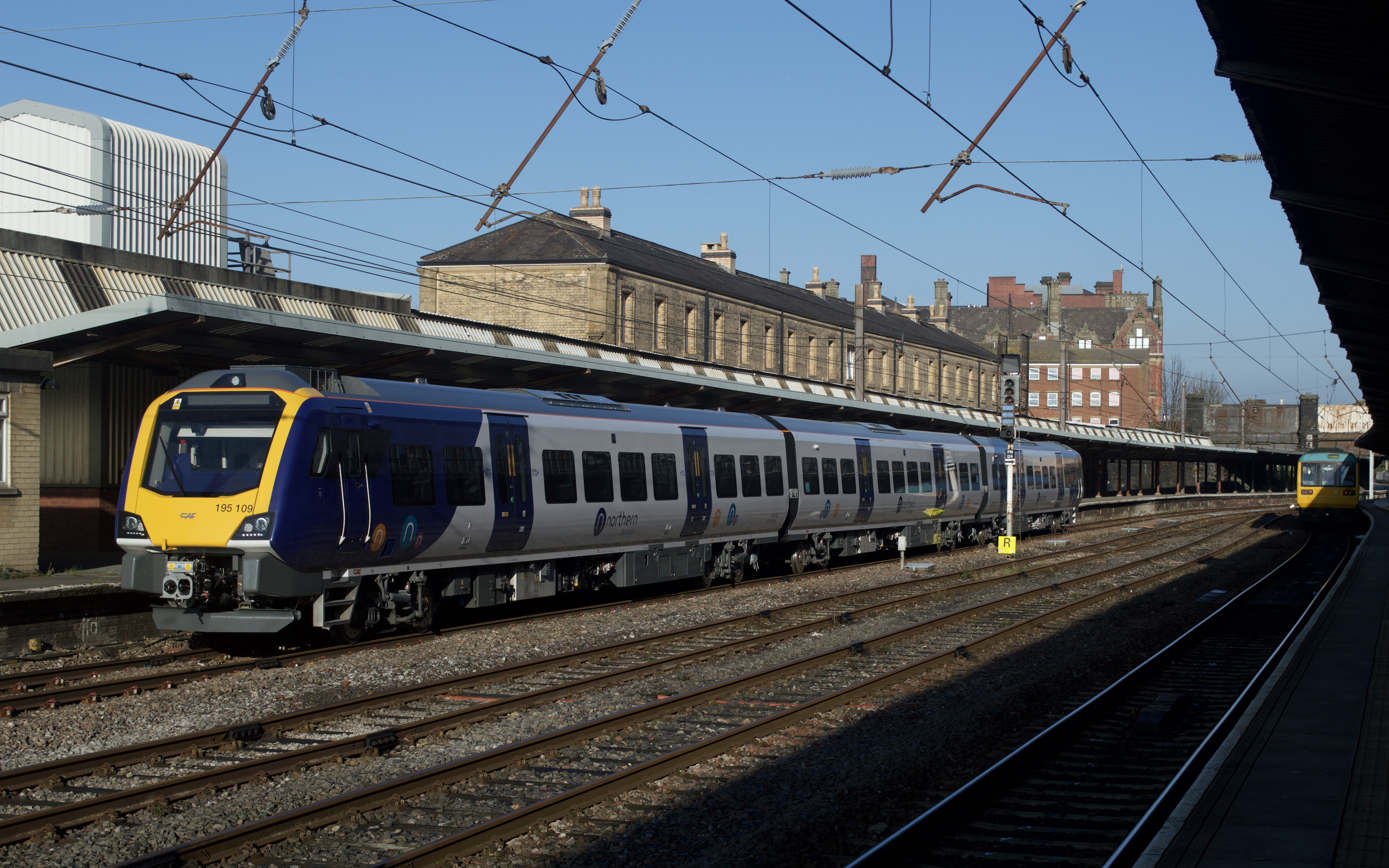
British Rail Class 195 Civity, one of the prospective units to be manufactured at the CAF production line in Newport, Wales

=== Multiple Units ===
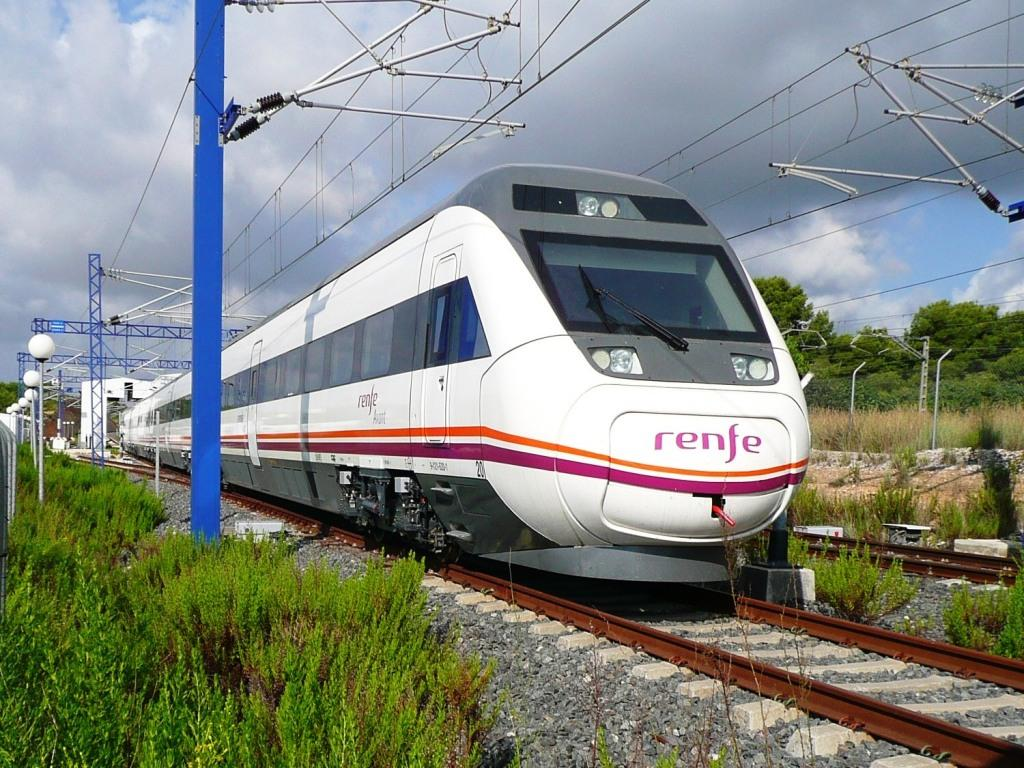
Renfe Operadora Class 121

CAF has manufactured electric and diesel‑multiple units (EMUs and DMUs) for commuter, regional and intercity services across several countries. Spanish national operator Renfe has ordered medium‑distance EMUs from CAF under its fleet renewal programmes. Since 2005, dual‑voltage Renfe Class 120 / 121 variable‑gauge EMUs operates in Spain on both high‑speed and conventional lines for Renfe services. CAF also built rolling stock for Euskotren, including the UT3500 units introduced in 1982, to the UT200 series from 1986, the UT300 series from 1990 and later the 900 and 950 series units.

Between 1998 and 2005, CAF made along with Alstom Ferroviaria the VR Class Sm4 EMUs to operate in Finland. In 2006 CAF supplied the DMU Class 61, EMU Class 71 and EMU Class 81 to be operated by the Serveis Ferroviaris de Mallorca.

In 2010, the Turkish commuter system İZBAN started using CAF‑built IZBAN E22000 three‑car EMUs on its electrified suburban network in İzmir. Since 2013, the New Zealand AM class electric multiple unit operates in Auckland following the electrification of the metropolitan rail network with CAF‑built sets in service.

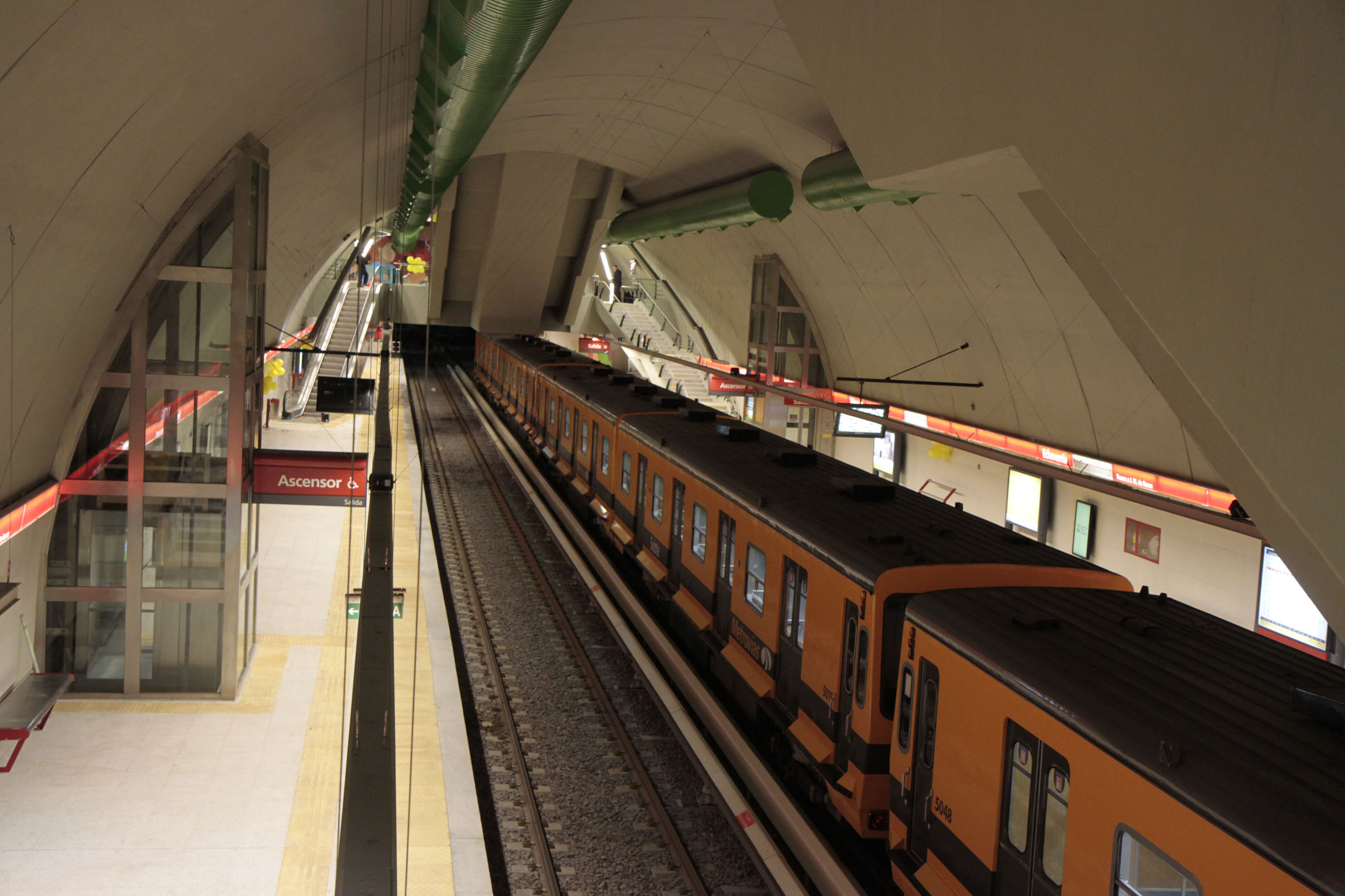
CAF 5000 on Line B of the Buenos Aires Underground

In 2022 CAF was awarded a contract for 28 medium‑distance EMUs to the Spanish company Renfe, bringing up to 60 trains designed for up to 200 km/h service and featuring battery capability for short non‑electrified sections. In the Netherlands, Nederlandse Spoorwegen (NS) deployed CAF Civity family multiple units, the Sprinter New Generation, including variants designed for suburban use and future double‑deck intercity versions ordered under a separate contract valued at over €600 million. CAF‑built Civity and derivative units were also supplied to other Dutch regional operators such as Qbuzz for use on lines equipped with European Train Control System (ERTMS).

In 2025, CAF offered to the operators and evolution of the Oaris model, as an alternative to Talgo.

=== Locomotives ===
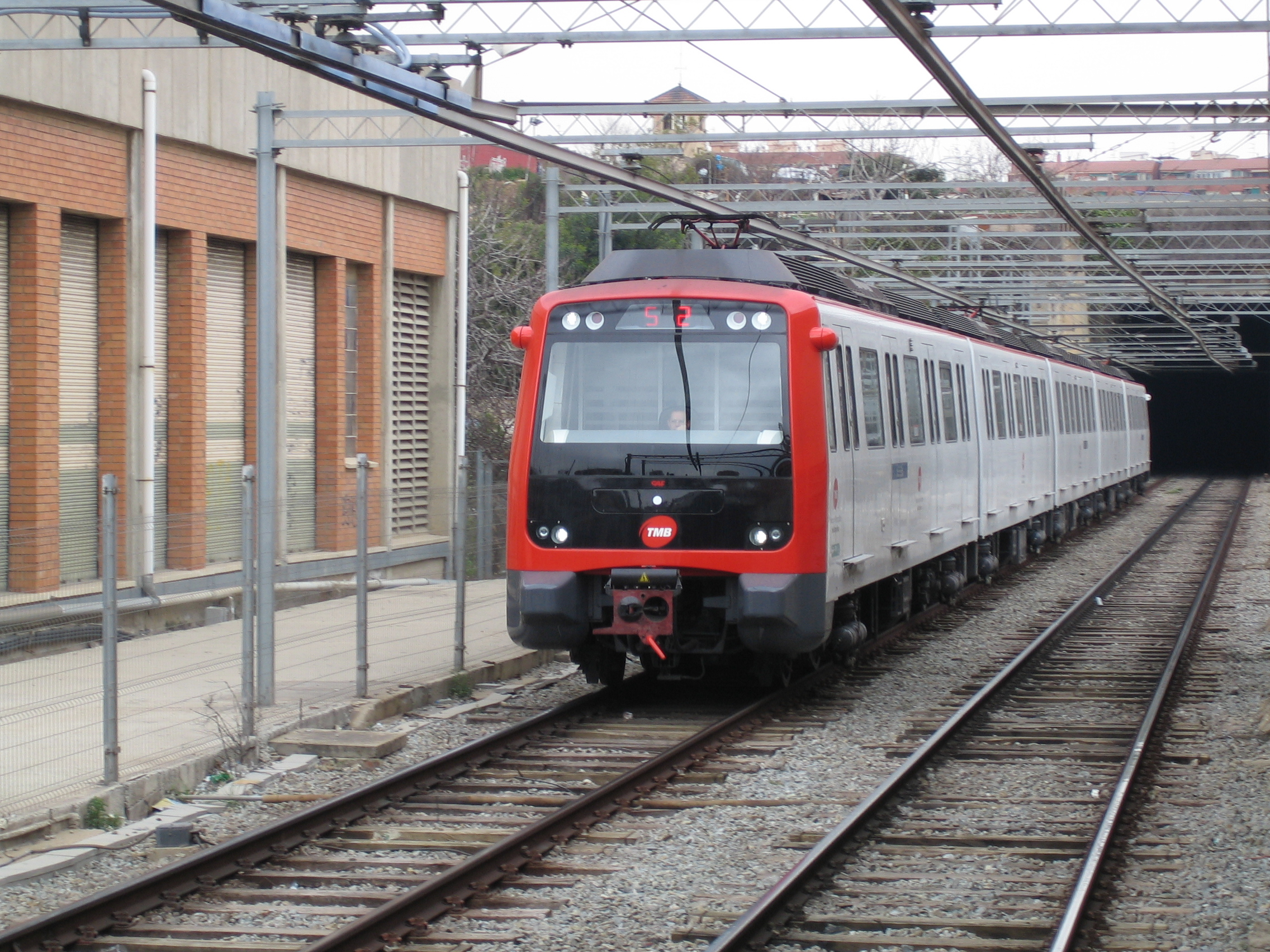
Barcelona Metro Class 5000 train.

Renfe Class 250, operated by Renfe from 1982 to 2010, are electric locomotives that were built by KraussMaffei and CAF a class of electric locomotives. Renfe Class 252 were built by Meinfesa, Siemens, Krauss-Maffei, and CAF for the AVE Madrid–Seville high speed line, and for general use to Iberian-gauge railway.

For the narrow-gauge operator FEVE, CAF supplied electro-diesel locomotives and diesel multiple units including Class 1900 electro-diesel locomotives and the Class 2600, Class 2700 or Class 2900 DMUs.

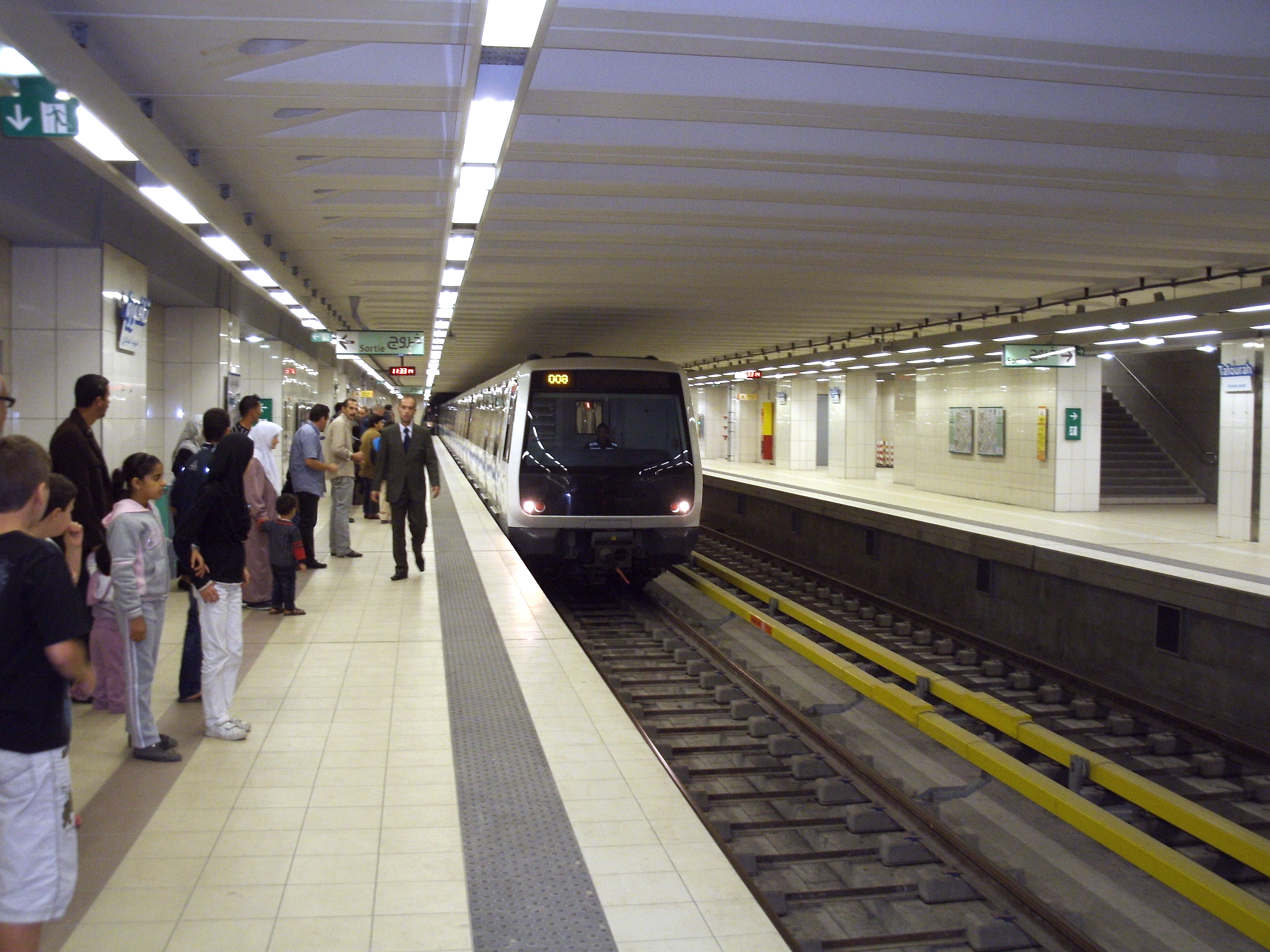
Algiers Metro

CAF developed the BITRAC CC 3600 (Class 601) electro-diesel locomotive platform for FESUR for freight services in Spain, entering in service in 2012 on routes including Avilés-Ponferrada. In the United Kingdom, CAF has also been a supplier of main‑line rolling stocklike the fleet of British Rail Mark 5 coaches for the Caledonian Sleeper service, a set of locomotive‑hauled carriages that entered service in 2019 on overnight routes between London Euston and Scottish destinations such as Edinburgh, Glasgow and Inverness. CAF later supplied the Mark 5A variant for use with TransPennine Express services.

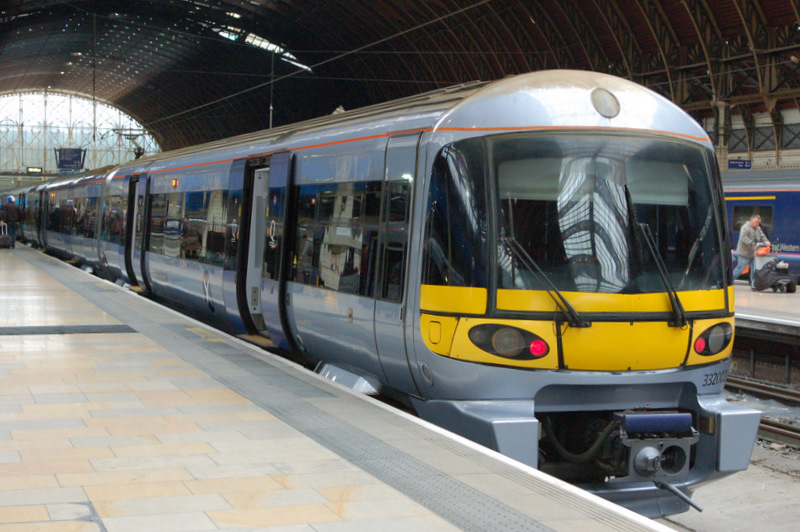
Heathrow Express Class 332

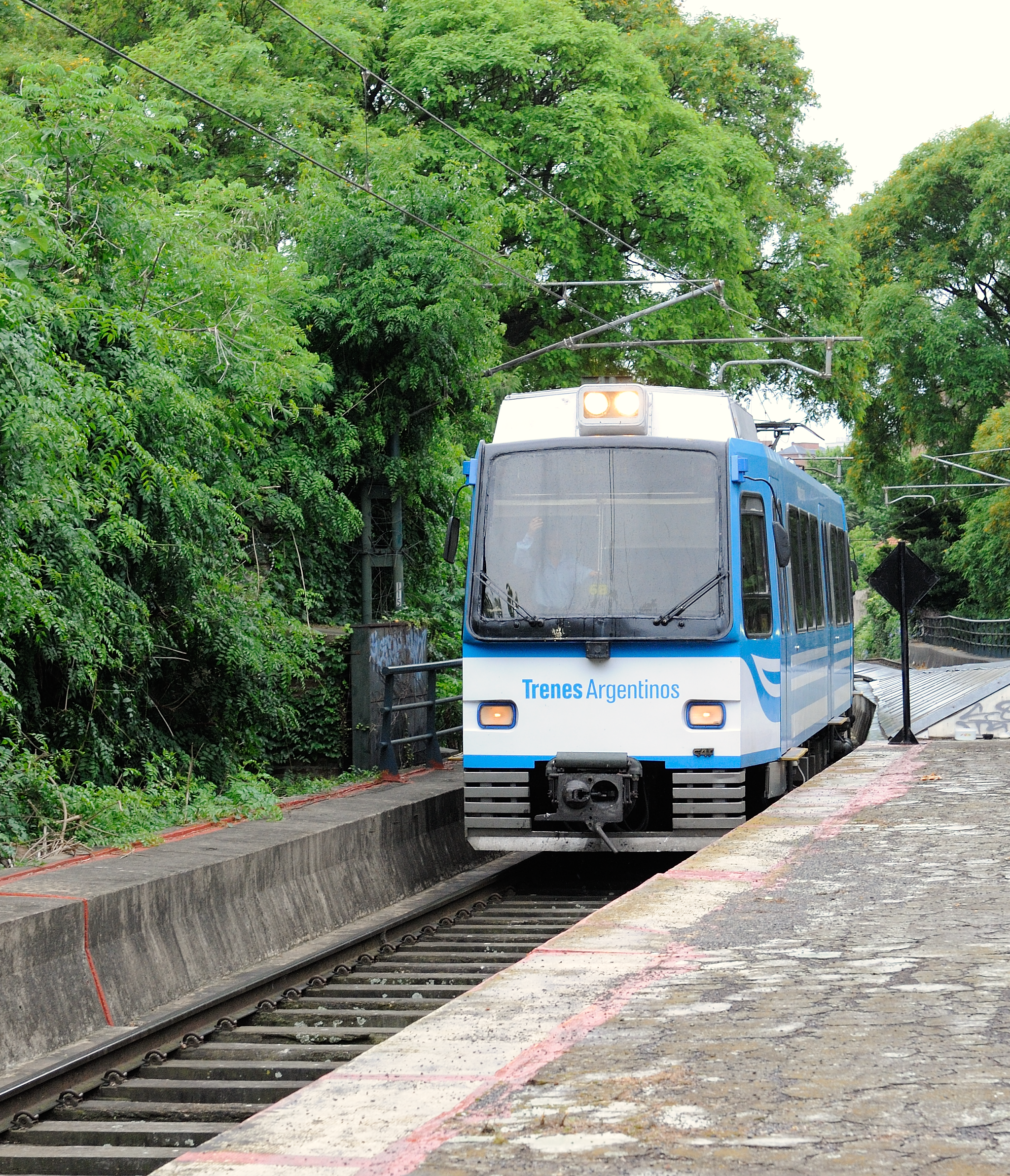
Tren de la Costa unit acquired in 1995

=== Metro and light rail ===
CAF has supplied metro and light rail rolling stock for urban rail systems in Spain and internationally. In Spain, the company has delivered metro trains for the Madrid and Barcelona networks across multiple series introduced from the 1980s onwards.

CAF has also manufactured low-floor trams under the Urbos platform for cities including Bilbao, Vitoria, Zaragoza, Seville, Málaga, Granada, Belgrado, Sidney, Birmingham, Cincinnati, Calgary, Amsterdam, Taipei, Antalya or Oslo, among others. By 2025, Urbos trams were in service in more than 38 cities across 19 countries, and CAF issued the Urbos number 1000.

Outside Spain, CAF has supplied metro and tram vehicles to operators in Europe, the Americas, Asia and Australia. These projects include metro fleets such as Buenos Aires Underground with the 5000 and 6000 series, São Paulo Metrô, New South Wales R sets, the SL18 in Oslo, Irish Rail 29000 Class, Schönbuch Railway in Germany, MÁV in Hungary.

CAF rolling stock operates in Algeria (Algiers Metro and DMUs), India (Delhi Airport Metro Express), the Philippines (Manila LRT Line 1, LRTA 13000 class), Taiwan (Kaohsiung Tram), and Türkiye (Istanbul Metro M4) among others cities.

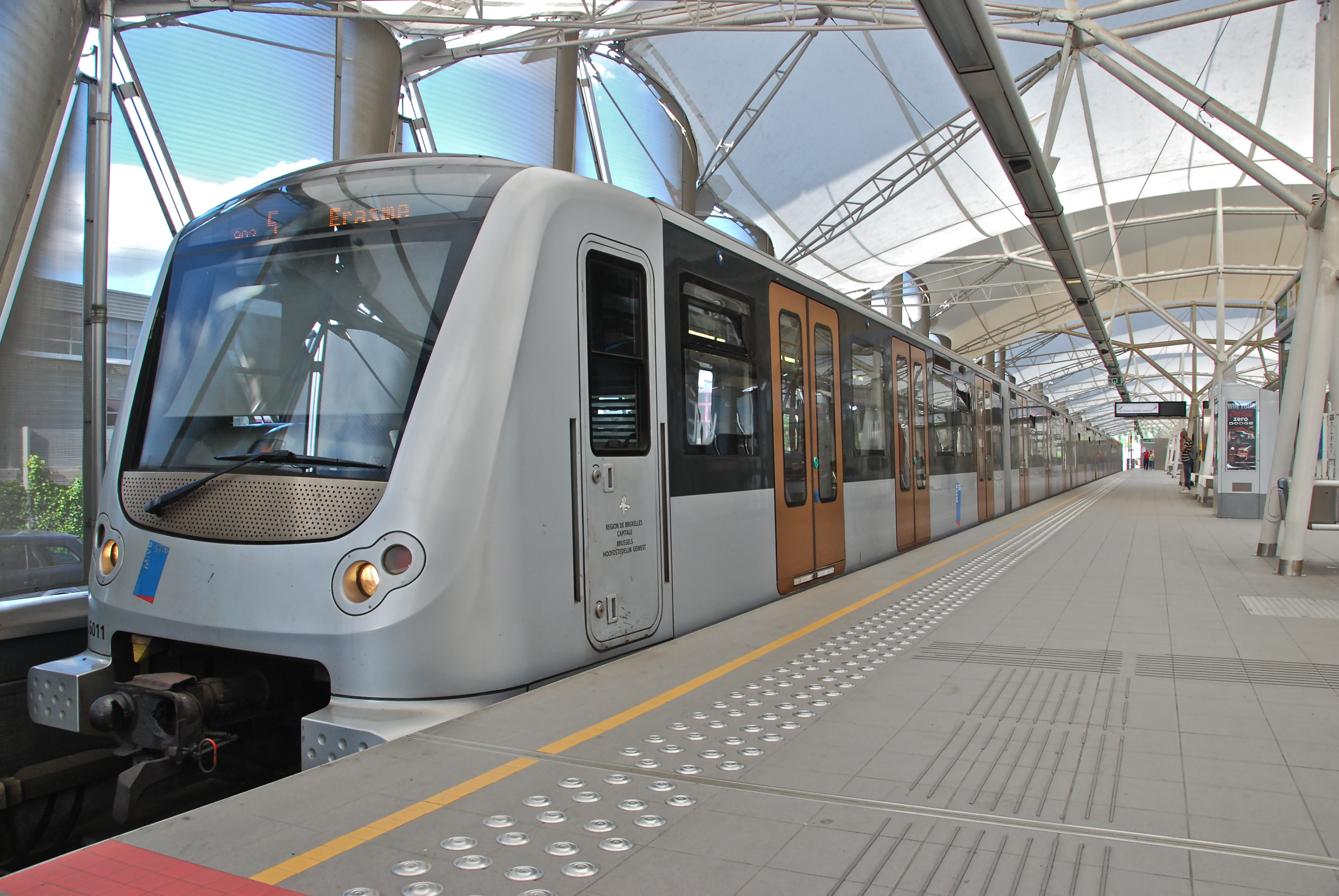
Brussels Metro M6 unit built by CAF

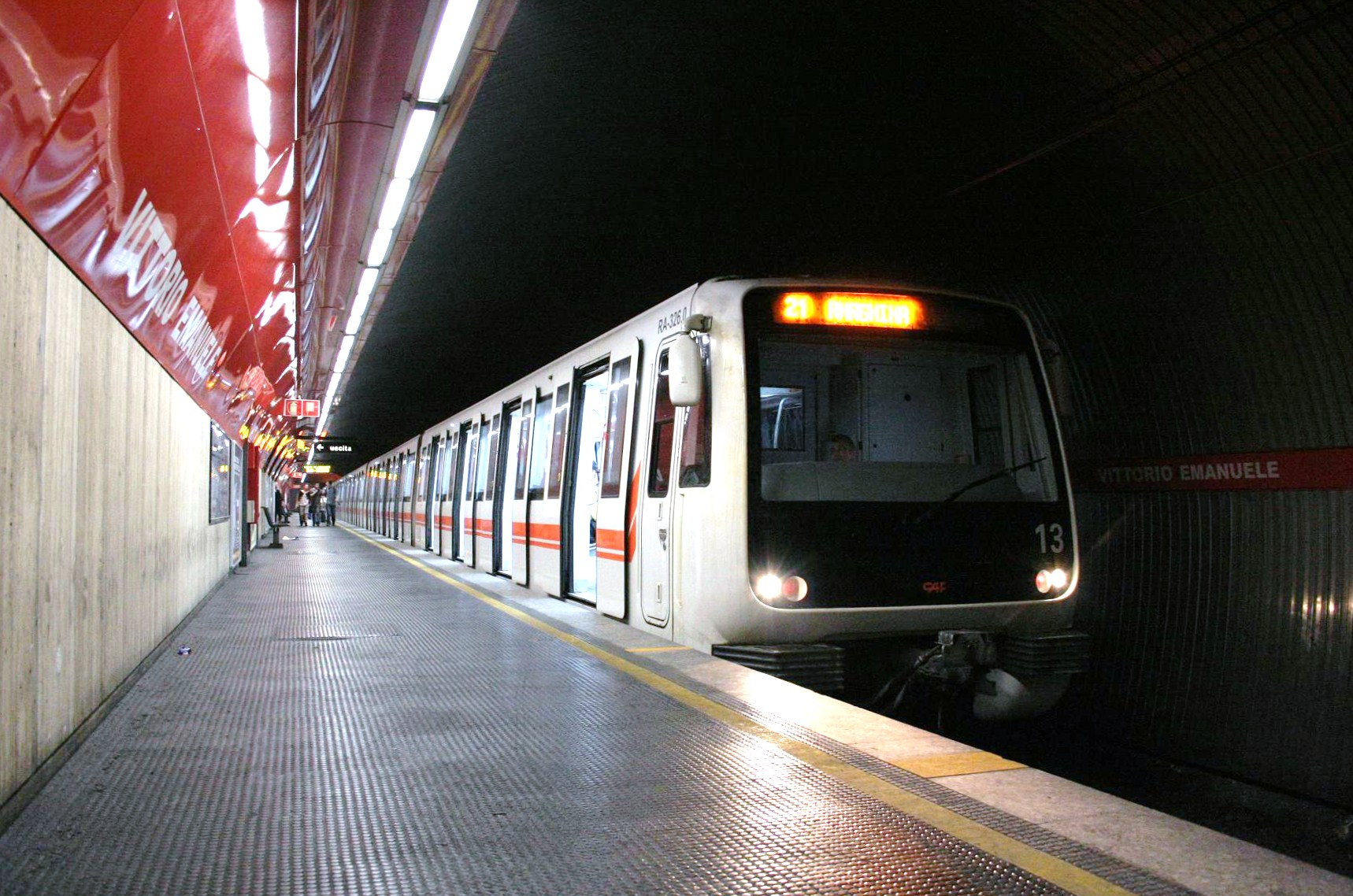
Rome metro MA300 train (built by CAF) on Line A.

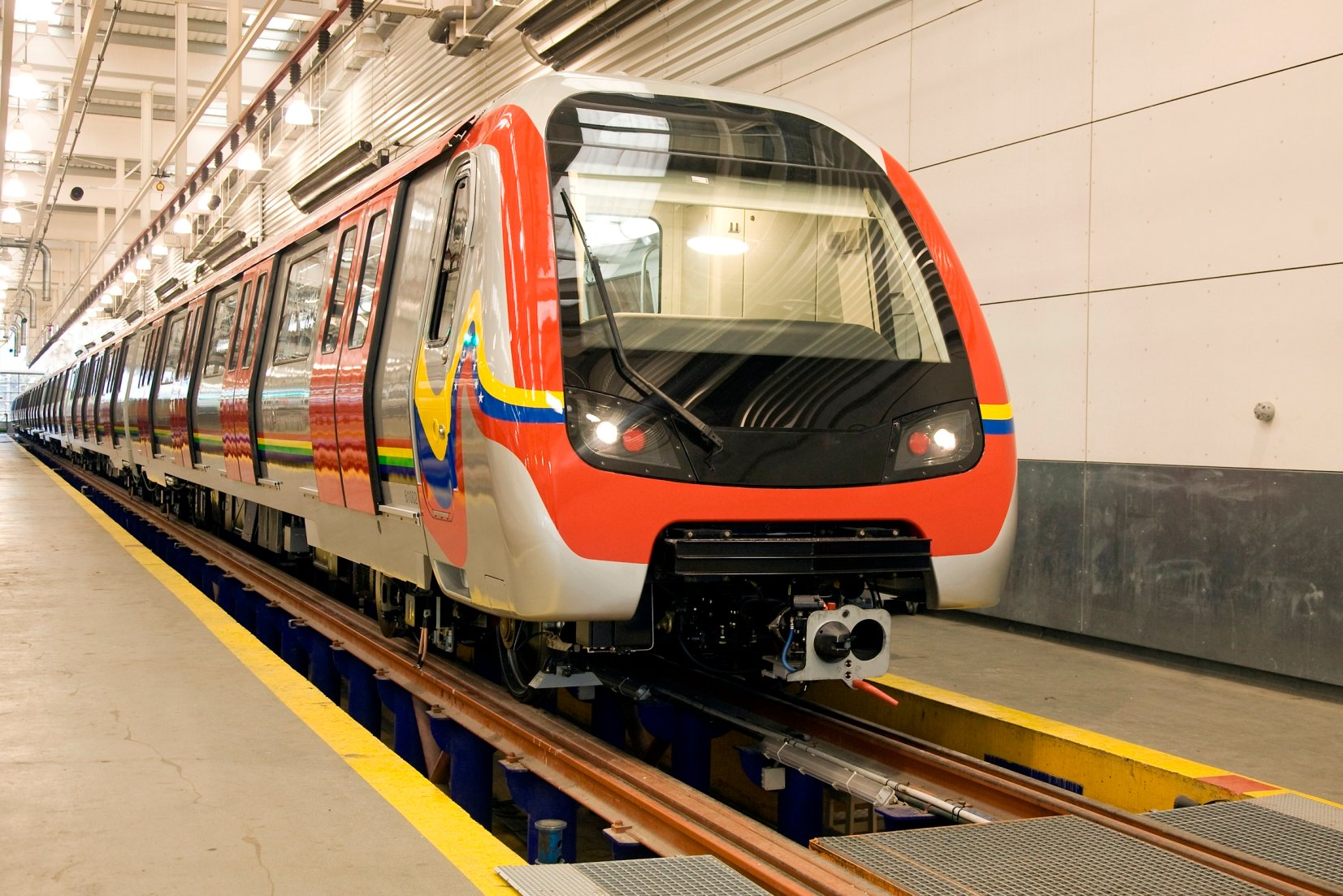
Caracas metro

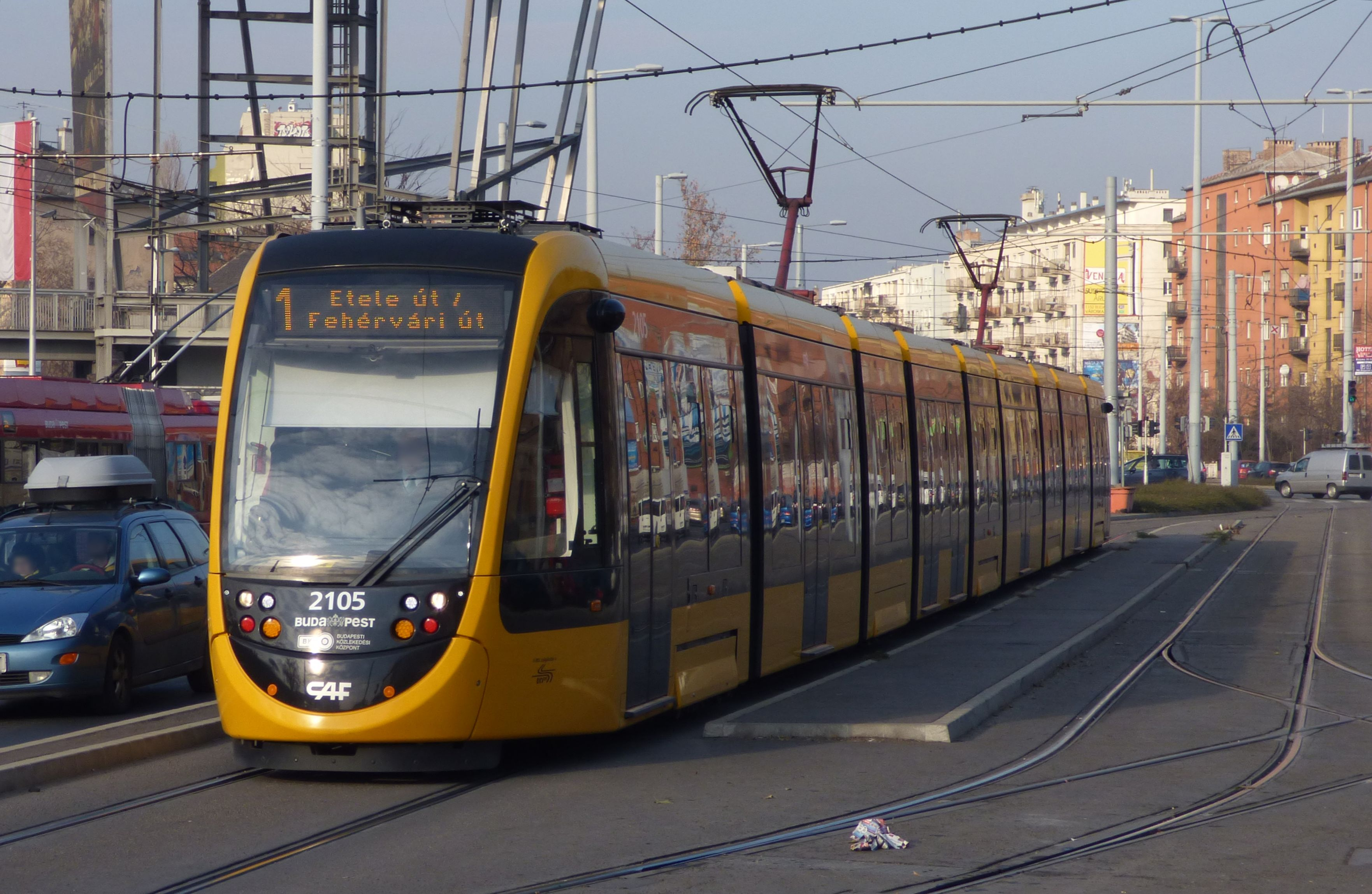
Budapest tram Line 1, the longest passenger tram in the world

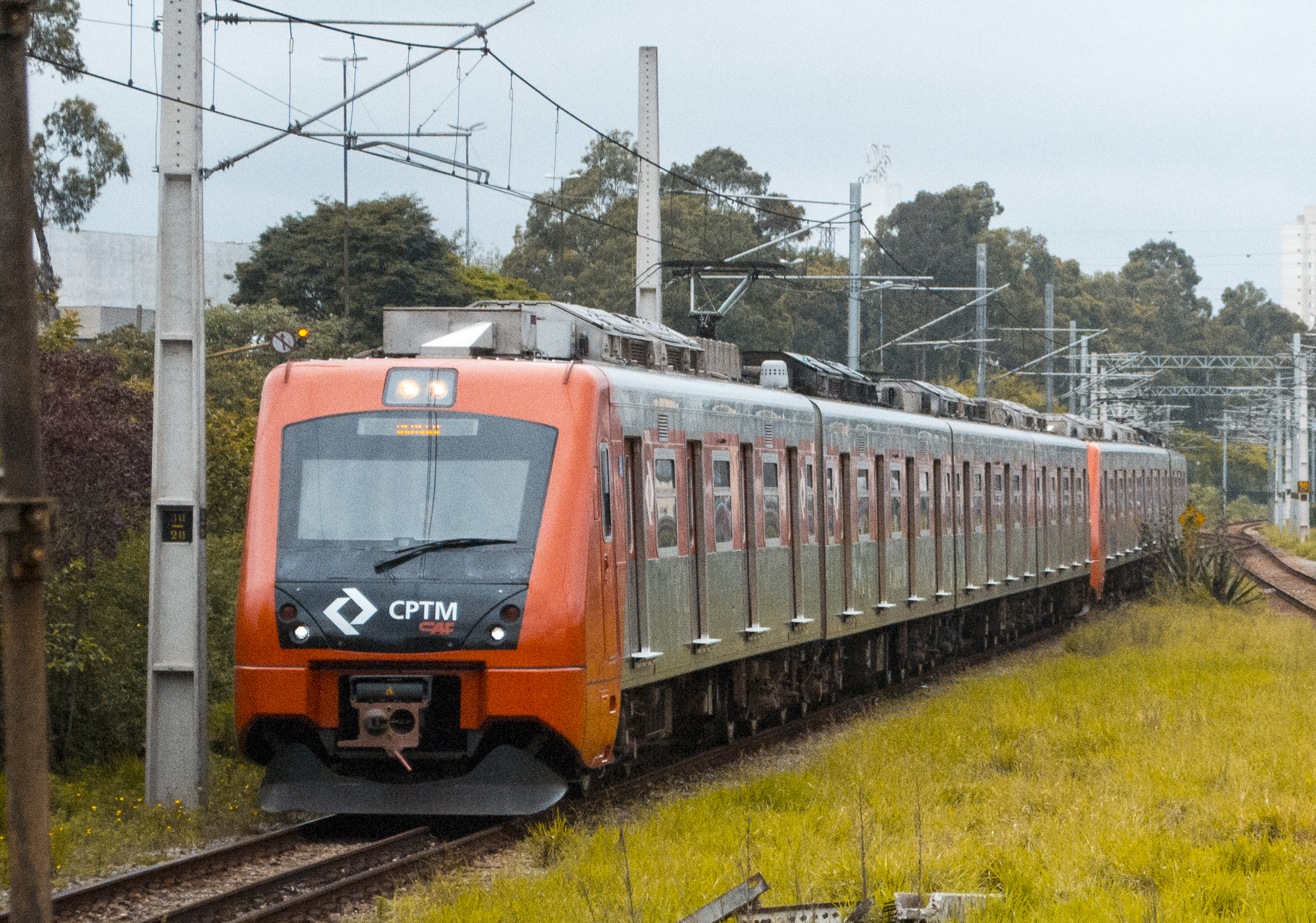
São Paulo commuter rail

== Political activity ==
During the 2019 United Kingdom general election, CAF Rail UK Limited made a donation of £50,000 to the Conservative Party.

=== United Nations blacklisting ===
In 2019, CAF was referred to Spain's OECD National Contact Point for a violation of the OECD Guidelines for Multinational Enterprises on Responsible Business Conduct. As part of the 'TransJerusalem J-Net' consortium with Israeli company Shapir Engineering and Industry, who are on the United Nations Human Rights Council list of companies that benefit from the Israeli occupation of Palestinian territories, CAF won a tender by the Israeli Ministry of Transport and Road Safety to supply railway equipment and to build, extend and operate light rail lines from Jerusalem to nearby Israeli settlements within the West Bank.

In 2025, reports by Amnesty International and United Nations rapporteur Francesca Albanese criticized CAF's involvement in the Jerusalem Light Rail project. In October 2025, CAF was listed by the Office of the United Nations High Commissioner for Human Rights as being a company conducting business in Israeli settlements within the occupied Palestinian territories.

== See also ==
- Karlos Arguiñano, a former worker at CAF who later became famous as a TV chef.
- Variable gauge axles
- List of rolling stock manufacturers
