= Renfe Class 250 =

Spanish electric locomotive class

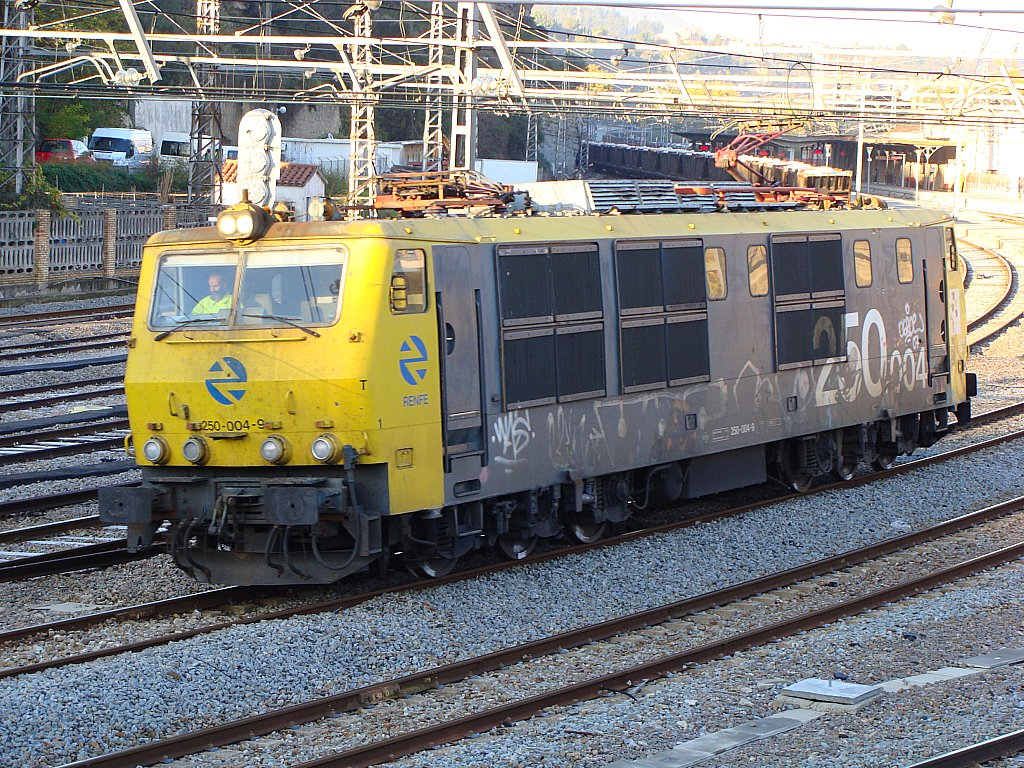
- Locomotive 250 004 in November 2008
Type and origin
- Power type: Electric
- Builder: Krauss Maffei, CAF; Electrical equipment: BBC
- Build date: 1982–1988
- Total produced: 40 (35 + 5)
Specifications
- Configuration
  - AAR: C-C
  - UIC: C'C'
- Gauge: 1,668 mm (5 ft 5 21/32 in)
- Bogies: monomotor, pivot-less, axlebox guidance by Watt's linkages
- Wheel diameter: 1250 mm (new)
- Wheelbase: 3600 mm (bogie), 13800 mm (locomotive)
- Length: 20.0 m (65 ft 7 in)
- Width: 3.13 m (10 ft 3 in)
- Height: 3.82 m (12 ft 6 in) carbody roof 4.29 m (14 ft 1 in) roof hatches, with pantos down
- Frame type: outside, fully sprung
- Axle load: 20,67 t, 21,67 t
- Loco weight: 124 t, 130 t
- Electric system/s: 3000 V DC overhead catenary
- Current pickup: Pantograph
- Traction motors: 2x series-wound, twin-armature, bogie-mounted "6 EDO 8146"
- Transmission: gears (monomotor bogies, changeable transmission at standstill) with BBC rubber-sprung, tubular-shaft, resilient cardan drives
- Train heating: electric
- Loco brake: pneumatic, electric
- Train brakes: pneumatic
Performance figures
- Maximum speed: 100 km/h (60 mph); 160 km/h (100 mph)
- Power output: 4,600 kW (6,169 hp) (cont.); 4,940 kW (6,625 hp) (one-hour)
- Tractive effort: 410 kN / 256 kN (starting); 316 kN / 197 kN (cont.)
- Brakeforce: 251 kN @ 13...58 km/h 157 kN @ 21...93 km/h (electric)
Career
- Operators: Renfe
- Class: Serie 250 de Renfe
- Numbers: 250 001–250 035; 250 601–250 605
- Disposition: Spain

The Renfe Class 250 was a class of electric locomotives operated by Renfe in Spain, built by Krauss Maffei and CAF, with Brown, Boveri electrical equipment. They operated between 1982 and 2010.

== Variants ==
The fleet consisted of 35 Class 250 locomotives, numbered 250 001–035, and five Class 250.6 locomotives, numbered 250 601–605, which are equipped with chopper control.

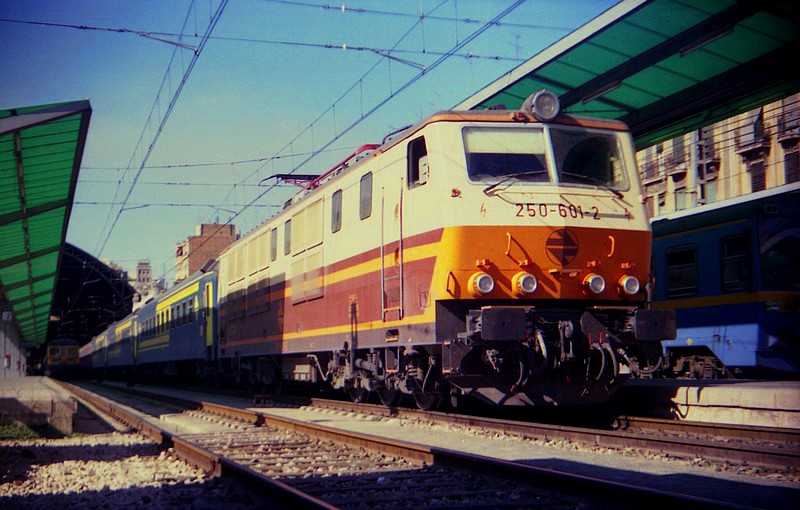
250 601 in July 1987

== Technical specifications ==
The locomotives have a C'C' UIC wheel arrangement, and are equipped with monomotor bogies, which have switchable gear ratios. Their maximum axle load is 22 tonnes.

== History ==
The locomotives were introduced in 1982. A total of 40 locomotives have been built. They were mainly used on freight services by Renfe's Cargas freight and Transporte Combinado intermodal divisions. They were withdrawn in 2010.
