= Euskotren 900 series =

Electric multiple unit operated by Euskotren

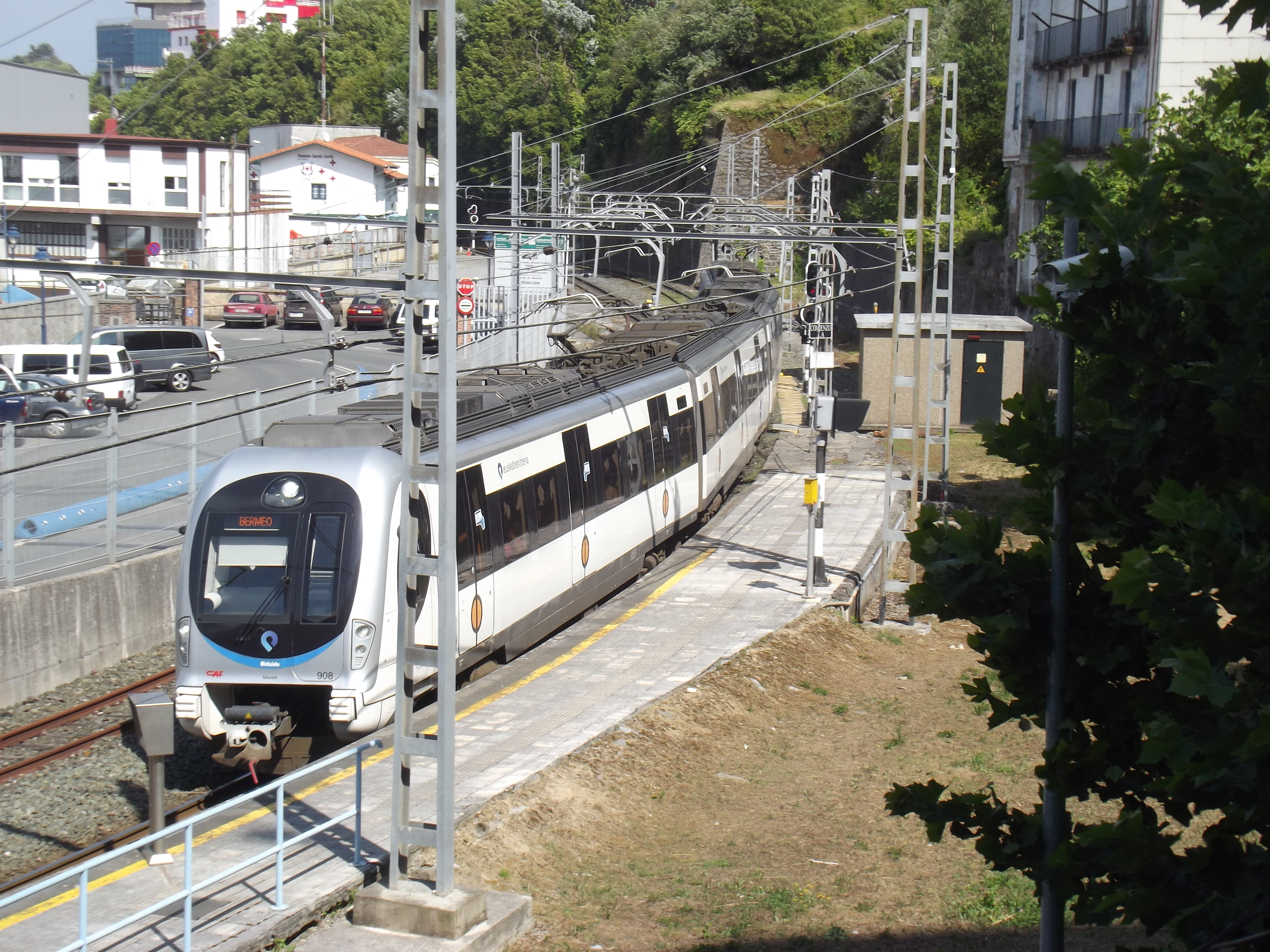
- Set 908 in Bermeo, July 2015
- In service: 2011–present
- Manufacturer: CAF
- Built at: Beasain, Spain
- Replaced: 200, 3500 series
- Constructed: 2010–2014
- Entered service: 22 July 2011
- Number built: 30 sets
- Number in service: 30 sets
- Formation: 4-car sets
- Fleet numbers: 901–930
- Capacity: 400
- Operators: Euskotren

Specifications
- Car body construction: Aluminium
- Train length: 69,458 mm (227 ft 10.6 in)
- Car length: 17,729 mm (58 ft 2 in) (end cars); 17 m (55 ft 9 5/16 in) (intermediate cars)
- Width: 2.6 m (8 ft 6 3/8 in)
- Height: 3,615 mm (11 ft 10 5/16 in)
- Floor height: 1.08 m (3 ft 7 in)
- Doors: 3 per side
- Wheel diameter: 850–790 mm (33–31 in) (new–worn)
- Maximum speed: 90 km/h (56 mph)
- Traction system: CAF IGBT–VVVF
- Traction motors: 8 × TSA TME 44-26-4 180 kW (240 hp)
- Power output: 1,440 kW (1,930 hp)
- Transmission: 5.9:1 gear ratio
- Acceleration: 1.1 m/s^{2} (3.6 ft/s^{2})
- Deceleration: 1.1 m/s^{2} (3.6 ft/s^{2}) (service); 1.2 m/s^{2} (3.9 ft/s^{2}) (emergency)
- Electric system(s): 1,500 V DC overhead line
- Current collection: Pantograph
- UIC classification: Bo′Bo′+2′2′+2′2′+Bo′Bo′
- Safety system(s): LZB
- Coupling system: Scharfenberg
- Track gauge: 1,000 mm (3 ft 3 3/8 in) metre gauge

The Euskotren 900 series is an electric multiple unit (EMU) train type operated by Euskotren in the Basque Country, Spain and up to Hendaye over the French border.

== History ==
In January 2009, Euskotren awarded CAF the construction of 27 3-car EMUs for 129 million euros, excluding VAT. The contract was later extended to 30 4-car EMUs for 201 million euros.

The first trainset was delivered on 16 March 2011 in Durango. Five days later, on March 21, it made its first test trip on the Topo line. The series entered service on that same line (Euskotren's busiest) on July 22.

The series gradually replaced the older 200 and 3500 series trains, with the last unit being delivered in 2014.

== Interior ==
Each train has 214 seats, with additional space for 186 standing passengers. Internally, the four cars are connected with open gangways. Ten of the trains (those used on longer routes) are equipped with toilets.

Wheelchair spaces are provided at one end of the two intermediate cars, the doors near them are equipped with ramps. All trains have dedicated spaces for passengers carrying bicycles.

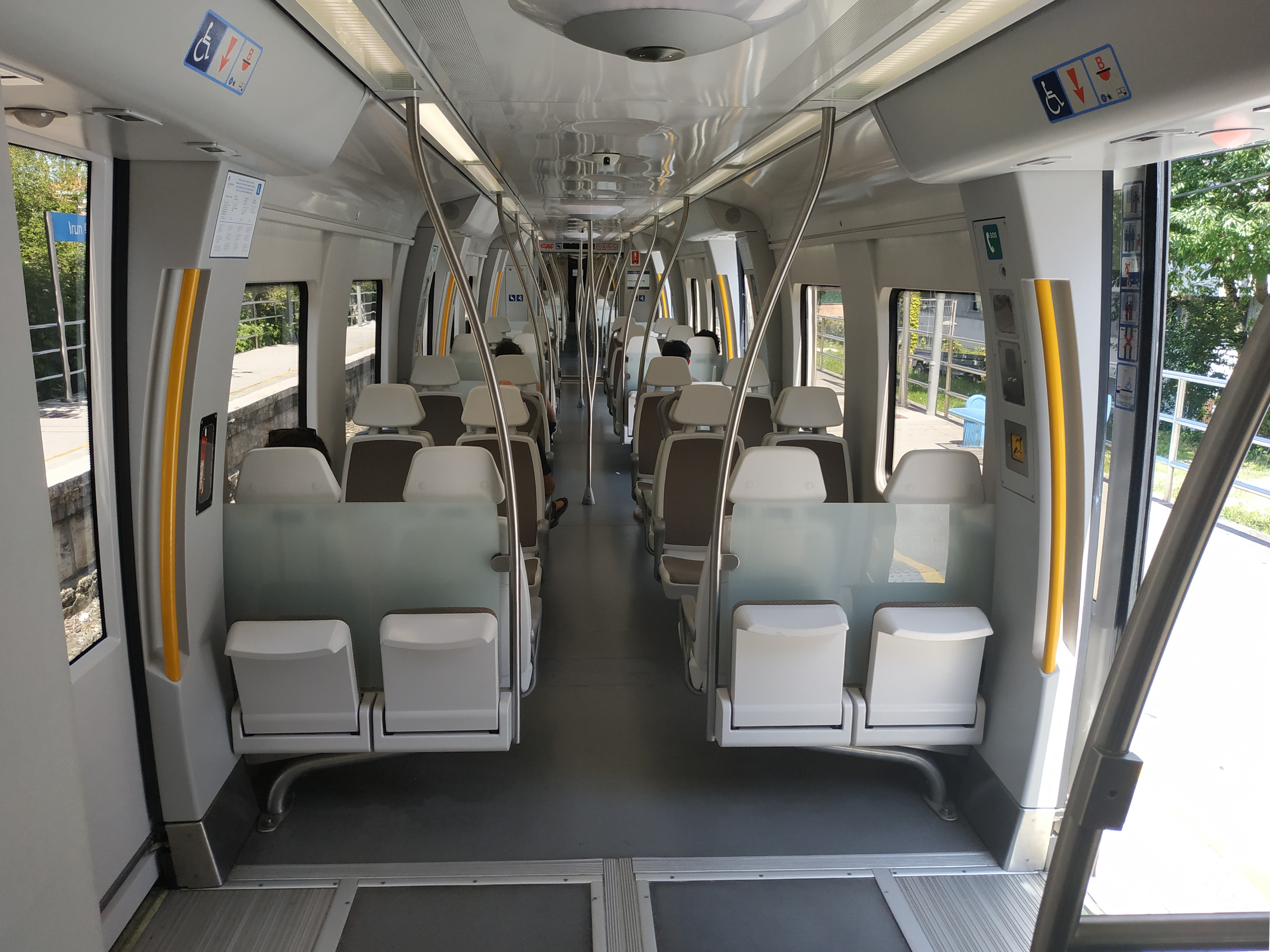
Interior view.

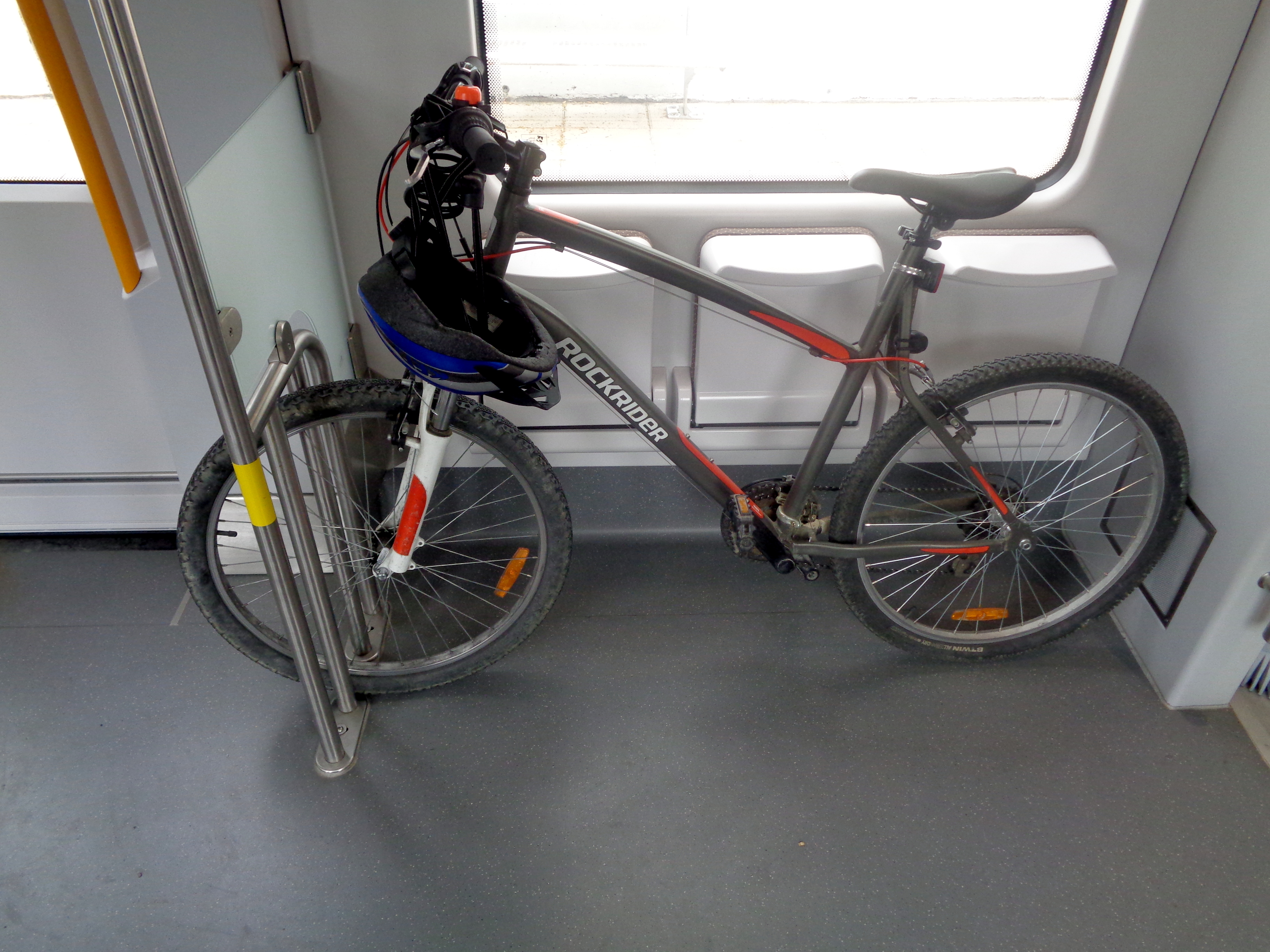
Dedicated space for bicycles.

== Naming ==
The units are named after towns and villages in which Euskotren operates.

== See also ==
- Euskotren rolling stock
- Euskotren 950 series – the three-car counterpart of the 900 series
