= Euskotren 200 series =

Electric multiple unit operated by Euskotren

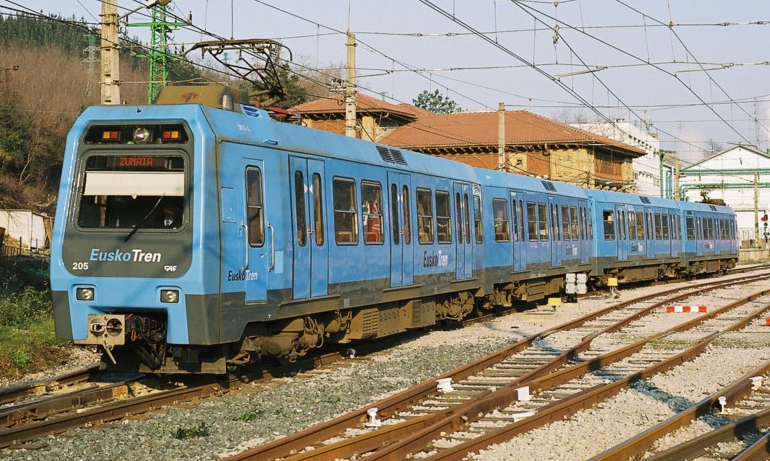
- Set 205 in Lasarte-Oria, March 2005
- In service: 1990–2018
- Manufacturers: CAF, B&W, Westinghouse
- Built at: Beasain, Erandio, and Sestao; Spain
- Constructed: 1985–2000
- Entered service: 1 February 1986
- Number built: 20
- Number preserved: 1
- Formation: 3 cars; 4 cars
- Fleet numbers: 201–220
- Capacity: 386 (260 seated)
- Operator: Euskotren

Specifications
- Car body construction: Aluminium
- Train length: 51,650 mm (169 ft 5 in); 68,830 mm (225 ft 10 in)
- Width: 2,450 mm (8 ft 0 in)
- Height: 3,620 mm (11 ft 11 in)
- Doors: 3 (per side and car)
- Maximum speed: 80 km/h (49.7 mph)
- Weight: 92.5 tonnes (204,000 lb); 120 tonnes (260,000 lb)
- Power output: 960 kW (1,290 hp) (total)
- Electric system: 1,500 V DC overhead line
- Current collection: Pantograph
- UIC classification: Bo'Bo'+2'2'+Bo'Bo'; Bo'Bo'+2'2'+2'2'+Bo'Bo'
- Coupling system: Scharfenberg
- Track gauge: 1,000 mm (3 ft 3 3/8 in)

The Euskotren 200 series is an electric multiple unit (EMU) train type operated by Euskotren in the Basque Country, Spain from 1986 to 2018.

== History ==
The trains were ordered by Euskotren in 1983, with the first unit being delivered in 1985. They entered service on 1 February 1986, originally in the Bilbao-Plentzia line, where they replaced the rolling stock inherited from FTS. The trains had been intended for use in the Bilbao Metro (which took over most of the Bilbao-Plentzia railway), but ultimately new trains were built for it. Thus, with the opening of the metro in 1995, the trains were transferred to the Txorierri, Urdaibai and Bilbao–San Sebastián lines. The trains were built entirely in the Basque Country: the motor cars by CAF in Beasain, the non-powered cars by Babcock & Wilcox in Sestao and the electrical equipment by Westingouse in Erandio.

The 20 trains originally consisted of 3 cars each. In 1996, 10 of them had a fourth car added, with the tree-car trains being used together with the 3500 series in the Urdaibai and Bilbao-San Sebastián lines. The remaining three-car trains had a fourth car added starting in 1999. All the new cars were built by CAF.

The 900 series, intended as a replacement of the 200 series, entered service in 2011. Starting in late 2017, the last 200 series units were retired from active service, with the trains being put up for auction in January 2018. On 24 November 2018, the last remaining unit was retired after a farewell trip, the train was then sent to the Basque Railway Museum for preservation.

== Formations ==
| Designation | Mc | R | R | Mc |
| Numbering | 2xx-1 | 2xx-2 | 2xx-4 | 2xx-3 |

Originally, each trainset was formed by two motored cars and two non-powered cars. Between 1996 and 2000 all units had a fourth (non-powered) car added.

== See also ==
- Euskotren rolling stock
